= Joan Armatrading discography =

- Studio albums: 21
- EPs: 2
- Live albums: 4
- Compilation albums: 13
- Singles: 59
- Box sets: 2

This article is the discography of British singer-songwriter Joan Armatrading.

== Albums ==
=== Studio albums ===
Year	Album	Details	Peak chart positions										Certifications
Year	Album	Details	UK	AUS	AUT	GER	NL	NOR	NZ	SWE	US	US Blues	Certifications
1972	Whatever's for Us	Released: November 1972; Label: Cube, A&M (US)	—	—	—	—	—	—	—	—	—	—	—
1975	Back to the Night	Released: April 1975; Label: A&M	—	—	—	—	—	—	—	—	—	—	—
1976	Joan Armatrading	Released: September 1976; Label: A&M	12	52	—	—	—	—	11	—	67	—	BPI: Gold
1977	Show Some Emotion	Released: October 1977; Label: A&M	6	18	—	—	—	—	25	—	52	—	BPI: Gold
1978	To the Limit	Released: September 1978; Label: A&M	13	42	—	—	—	13	21	—	125	—	—
1980	Me Myself I	Released: May 1980; Label: A&M	5	13	12	23	5	2	4	15	28	—	BPI: Gold; ARIA: Platinum
1981	Walk Under Ladders	Released: September 1981; Label: A&M	6	16	—	46	9	4	7	17	88	—	BPI: Gold
1983	The Key	Released: February 1983; Label: A&M	10	4	—	24	17	—	3	14	32	—	BPI: Gold
1985	Secret Secrets	Released: February 1985; Label: A&M	14	18	—	59	48	—	26	—	73	—	BPI: Silver
1986	Sleight of Hand	Released: May 1986; Label: A&M	34	39	—	57	51	—	42	—	70	—	BPI: Silver
1988	The Shouting Stage	Released: June 1988; Label: A&M	28	21	—	—	48	—	23	—	100	—	BPI: Silver
1990	Hearts and Flowers	Released: June 1990; Label: A&M	29	56	—	—	93	—	—	—	161	—	—
1992	Square the Circle	Released: June 1992; Label: A&M	34	106	—	—	—	—	—	—	—	—	—
1995	What's Inside	Released: May 1995; Label: RCA	48	91	—	—	—	—	—	—	—	—	—
2003	Lovers Speak	Released: 25 May 2003; Label: Telstar, Denon	77	—	—	—	—	—	—	—	—	—	—
2007	Into the Blues	Released: 29 April 2007; Label: Hypertension, 429	125	—	—	61	78	—	—	—	—	1	—
2010	This Charming Life	Released: 30 March 2010; Label: Hypertension, 429	135	—	—	79	64	—	—	—	—	—	—
2012	Starlight	Released: 28 May 2012; Label: Hypertension, 429	139	—	—	—	—	—	—	—	—	—	—
2018	Not Too Far Away	Released: 18 May 2018; Label: BMG	30	—	—	—	—	—	—	—	—	—	—
2021	Consequences	Released: 18 June 2021; Label: BMG	10	—	—	—	—	—	—	—	—	—	—
2024	How Did This Happen and What Does It Now Mean	Released: 22 November 2024; Label: BMG	69	—	—	—	—	—	—	—	—	—	—
"—" denotes releases that did not chart or were not released

=== Live albums ===
Year	Album	Details	Peak chart positions	
Year	Album	Details	AUS	NZ
1979	Steppin' Out	Released: August 1979; Label: A&M	23	11
2004	Live: All the Way from America	Released: 13 July 2004; Label: Savoy	—	—
2011	Live at Royal Albert Hall	Released: 22 February 2011; Label: 429	—	—
2016	Me Myself I World Tour	Released: 11 November 2016; Label: 429	—	—
2022	Live at Asylum Chapel	Released: 4 November 2022; Label: BMG	—	—
"—" denotes releases that did not chart or were not released

=== Compilations ===
Year	Album	Details	Peak chart positions					Certifications
Year	Album	Details	UK	AUS	NL	NZ	US	Certifications
1983	Track Record	Released: November 1983; Label: A&M	18	4	—	11	113	—
1987	Classics Volume 21	Released: 1987; Label: A&M; Released in Japan as Classics Volume 10	—	—	—	—	—	—
1991	The Very Best of Joan Armatrading	Released: March 1991; Label: A&M	9	70	83	—	—	BPI: Gold
1996	Love & Affection	Released: 1996; Label: A&M; Germany-only release	—	—	—	—	—	—
1997	Joan Armatrading	Released: 1997; Label: A&M	—	—	—	—	—	—
1998	The Collection	Released: 1998; Label: Spectrum Music	—	—	—	—	—	BPI: Gold
2000	The Best of Joan Armatrading	Released: August 2000; Label: A&M; US and Canada-only release	—	—	—	—	—	—
2000	Millennium Edition	Released: 2000; Label: A&M; Germany-only release	—	—	—	—	—	—
2001	Classic	Released: March 2001; Label: A&M; Released in the UK in 2009 by Spectrum Music	—	—	—	—	—	—
2003	Love And Affection: Classics (1975–1983)	Released: April 2003; Label: A&M	24	—	—	—	—	BPI: Silver
2007	Willow: The Joan Armatrading Collection	Released: October 2007; Label: Spectrum Music	—	—	—	—	—	—
2013	Love and Affection: The Very Best Of	Released: 27 May 2013; Label: Spectrum Music	—	—	—	—	—	—
2017	Love & Affection: The Essential Joan Armatrading	Released: 31 March 2017; Label: Spectrum Music	—	—	—	—	—	—
"—" denotes releases that did not chart or were not released

=== Box sets ===
Year	Title	Details
1987	The Collection	Released: 1987; Label: A&M; 5-LP box set: Joan Armatrading, Show Some Emotion, To the Limit, Me Myself I and Walk Under Ladders
2017	5 Classic Albums	Released: 26 May 2017; Label: Spectrum Music; 5-CD box set: Joan Armatrading, Show Some Emotion, Me Myself I, Walk Under Ladders and The Key

== Extended plays ==
Year	EP	Details	Peak chart positions		
Year	EP	Details	AUS	NL	NOR
1979	How Cruel	Released: November 1979; Label: A&M	60	10	19
2016	The Tempest Songs	Released: 19 September 2016; Label: 429	—	—	—
"—" denotes releases that did not chart or were not released

== Singles ==
Year	Single	Peak chart positions										Certifications	Album
Year	Single	UK	AUS	BEL (FL)	CAN	IRE	NL	NZ	SA	US	US Main.	Certifications	Album
1973	"All the King's Gardens"	—	—	—	—	—	—	—	—	—	—		Whatever's for Us
1973	"Lonely Lady"	—	—	—	—	—	—	—	—	—	—		non-album single
1975	"Back to the Night"	—	—	—	—	—	—	—	—	—	—		Back to the Night
1975	"Dry Land"	—	—	—	—	—	—	—	—	—	—		Back to the Night
1976	"Love and Affection"	10	—	—	—	16	—	—	—	—	—	BPI: Silver	Joan Armatrading
1976	"Water With the Wine"	—	—	—	—	—	—	—	—	—	—		Joan Armatrading
1976	"Alice"	—	—	—	—	—	—	—	—	—	—		non-album single
1977	"Down to Zero"	—	—	—	—	—	—	—	—	—	—		Joan Armatrading
1977	"Willow"	—	—	—	—	—	—	—	—	—	—		Show Some Emotion
1978	"Show Some Emotion"	—	—	—	—	—	—	—	—	110	—		Show Some Emotion
1978	"Warm Love"	—	77	—	—	—	—	—	—	—	—		Show Some Emotion
1978	"Flight of the Wild Geese"	—	—	—	—	—	—	—	—	—	—		The Wild Geese
1978	"Bottom to the Top"	—	—	—	—	—	—	—	—	—	—		To the Limit
1979	"Barefoot and Pregnant"	—	—	—	—	—	—	—	—	—	—		To the Limit
1979	"Steppin' Out" (Australia-only release)	—	—	—	—	—	—	—	—	—	—		Steppin' Out
1980	"Rosie"	49	52	27	—	—	19	33	—	—	—		How Cruel EP
1980	"He Wants Her" (US-only release)	—	—	—	—	—	—	—	—	—	—		How Cruel EP
1980	"Me Myself I"	21	24	—	—	13	38	14	13	—	—		Me Myself I
1980	"All the Way from America"	54	—	—	—	—	—	—	—	—	—		Me Myself I
1980	"Simon"	—	—	—	—	—	—	—	—	—	—		Me Myself I
1981	"I'm Lucky"	46	77	—	—	—	42	—	—	—	—		Walk Under Ladders
1981	"When I Get It Right"	— (Note: This single did not enter the UK Singles Chart, but did reach number 89 on the Record Business Top 100 Singles chart.)	—	—	—	—	—	—	—	—	—		Walk Under Ladders
1981	"The Weakness in Me"	—	—	—	—	—	—	—	—	—	—		Walk Under Ladders
1982	"No Love"	50	—	—	—	—	—	—	—	—	—		Walk Under Ladders
1982	"I Wanna Hold You"	—	—	—	—	—	—	—	—	—	—		Walk Under Ladders
1983	"Drop the Pilot"	11	6	35	—	12	—	6	1	78	33		The Key
1983	"(I Love It When You) Call Me Names"	—	20	—	—	—	—	43	—	—	—		The Key
1983	"What Do Boys Dream" (Australia-only release)	—	—	—	—	—	—	—	—	—	—		The Key
1983	"Heaven"	—	—	—	—	—	—	—	—	—	—		Track Record
1983	"Frustration" (Netherlands-only release)	—	—	—	—	—	—	—	—	—	—		Track Record
1985	"Temptation"	65	72	—	—	—	—	—	—	—	—		Secret Secrets
1985	"Thinking Man"	—	97	—	—	—	—	—	—	—	—		Secret Secrets
1985	"Love by You"	—	—	—	—	—	—	—	—	—	—		Secret Secrets
1986	"Kind Words (And a Real Good Heart)"	81	99	—	97	—	—	—	—	—	37		Sleight of Hand
1986	"Reach Out"	—	—	—	—	—	—	—	—	—	—		Sleight of Hand
1986	"Jesse"	129	—	—	—	—	—	—	—	—	—		Sleight of Hand
1986	"Angel Man" (Australia-only release)	—	—	—	—	—	—	—	—	—	—		Sleight of Hand
1988	"The Shouting Stage"	89	—	—	—	—	—	—	—	—	—		The Shouting Stage
1988	"Living for You"	98	—	—	89	—	—	—	—	—	—		The Shouting Stage
1988	"Stronger Love"	—	—	—	—	—	—	—	—	—	—		The Shouting Stage
1990	"More than One Kind of Love"	75	125	—	—	—	—	—	—	—	—		Hearts and Flowers
1990	"Promise Land"	—	—	—	—	—	—	—	—	—	—		Hearts and Flowers
1990	"Free"	—	—	—	—	—	—	—	—	—	—		Hearts and Flowers
1991	"Love and Affection" (reissue)	91	—	—	—	—	—	—	—	—	—		The Very Best of Joan Armatrading
1992	"Wrapped Around Her"	56	148	—	—	—	—	—	—	—	—		Square the Circle
1992	"True Love"	86	—	—	—	—	—	—	—	—	—		Square the Circle
1995	"Shapes and Sizes"	—	146	—	—	—	—	—	—	—	—		What's Inside
1996	"Recommend My Love"	—	167	—	—	—	—	—	—	—	—		What's Inside
1996	"Everyday Boy"	141	—	—	—	—	—	—	—	—	—		What's Inside
2007	"D.N.A." (Germany-only release)	—	—	—	—	—	—	—	—	—	—		Into the Blue
2010	"This Charming Life" (Germany-only release)	—	—	—	—	—	—	—	—	—	—		This Charming Life
2010	"Best Dress On" (Europe-only release)	—	—	—	—	—	—	—	—	—	—		This Charming Life
2012	"Tell Me" (Europe-only release)	—	—	—	—	—	—	—	—	—	—		Starlight
2012	"Starlight" (Europe-only release)	—	—	—	—	—	—	—	—	—	—		Starlight
2013	"Back on Track" (Europe-only release)	—	—	—	—	—	—	—	—	—	—		Starlight
2018	"I Like It When We're Together" (UK-only release)	—	—	—	—	—	—	—	—	—	—		Not Too Far Away
2018	"Loving What You Hate" (UK-only release)	—	—	—	—	—	—	—	—	—	—		Not Too Far Away
2021	"Already There"	—	—	—	—	—	—	—	—	—	—		Consequences
2024	"I'm Not Moving"	—	—	—	—	—	—	—	—	—	—		How Did This Happen and What Does It Now Mean
2024	"Someone Else"	—	—	—	—	—	—	—	—	—	—		How Did This Happen and What Does It Now Mean
2025	"25 Kisses"	—	—	—	—	—	—	—	—	—	—		How Did This Happen and What Does It Now Mean
"—" denotes releases that did not chart or were not released

== Other appearances ==
Year	Song	Album	Notes
1997	"Angels from the Realms of Glory"	The Carols of Christmas II	
1999	"The Messenger"	digital download	original tribute song to Nelson Mandela
2001	"Mood Indigo"	Red Hot + Indigo	Duke Ellington cover with Melky Sedeck
