= The Very Best of Joan Armatrading =

Greatest hits album by Joan Armatrading
- Released: 26 February 1991
- Recorded: 1975–1991
- Genre: Pop; rock
- Length: 53:48
- Label: A&M
- Producer: Joan Armatrading; Glyn Johns; Henry Lewy; Richard Gottehrer; Steve Lillywhite; Val Garay

Joan Armatrading chronology
Hearts and Flowers (1990)	The Very Best of Joan Armatrading (1991)	Square the Circle (1992)

Professional ratings
Review scores
Source	Rating
AllMusic	4/5 stars
Encyclopedia of Popular Music	4/5 stars

The Very Best of Joan Armatrading is a greatest hits album by Joan Armatrading, released in February 1991. It features a remix by Hugh Padgham of Love and Affection. The record peaked at number 9 in the UK albums chart and was certified Gold by the British Phonographic Industry.

== Track listing ==
All tracks are written by Joan Armatrading.

No.	Title	From the album:	Length
1.	"Love and Affection (Remix)"	Joan Armatrading	4:28
2.	"Down to Zero"	Joan Armatrading	3:51
3.	"Drop the Pilot"	The Key	3:39
4.	"Show Some Emotion"	Show Some Emotion	3:33
5.	"The Shouting Stage"	The Shouting Stage	4:32
6.	"Willow"	Show Some Emotion	4:03
7.	"Rosie"	How Cruel EP	3:14
8.	"I'm Lucky"	Walk Under Ladders	3:06
9.	"Me Myself I"	Me Myself I	3:20
10.	"(I Love It When You) Call Me Names"	The Key	3:29
11.	"Bottom to the Top"	To the Limit	3:36
12.	"More than One Kind of Love"	Hearts and Flowers	4:36
13.	"The Weakness in Me"	Walk Under Ladders	3:34
14.	"All the Way from America"	Me Myself I	4:50
Total length:			53:48
