= Live: All the Way from America =

Live album by Joan Armatrading
- Released: 13 July 2004
- Recorded: Saratoga, California
- Genre: Pop
- Length: 70:00
- Label: Savoy Jazz, 429
- Producer: Joan Armatrading

Joan Armatrading chronology
Lovers Speak (2003)	Live: All the Way from America (2004)	Into the Blues (2007)

Live: All the Way from America is a live album by the British singer-songwriter Joan Armatrading. It was Armatrading's second live album, following the 1979 release of Steppin' Out, and was, therefore, the first live album she had released in twenty-five years. Armatrading was on tour following the release of her 2003 studio album Lovers Speak, and a concert from this tour was recorded on 25 June 2003 at the Lillian Fontaine Garden Theatre in Saratoga, California. The album takes its title from her 1980 song "All the Way from America", which originally appeared on the album Me Myself I. It was released in 2004 on digital format, CD and DVD by Savoy Records / SLG, and re-released in 2009 in CD format on the 429 Records label.

== Background ==
The album presents the set from the concert exactly as it was, with no overdubs, though the gaps between songs were edited down. It contains six songs from Armatrading's "acclaimed" album Lovers Speak (2003), four songs from the Gold-certified album Joan Armatrading (1976), two songs from Me Myself I (1980), two songs from Show Some Emotion (1977), one song from Walk Under Ladders (1981) – all of which albums had also been certified Gold and had reached the top 10 in the UK album charts. It also contained the song "Rosie", which featured on the 1979 EP How Cruel as well as on her 1983 compilation album Track Record.

Armatrading had a pared-down band for the tour and for this album, featuring only herself on vocals and all guitars, multi-instrumentalist Gary Foote and Spencer Cozens on keyboards.

The DVD of the concert is 105 minutes long and contains the bonus tracks "Bottom to the Top", "On the Road" (tour video), and "In These Times" (studio version).

== Reception ==
Allmusic's Thom Jurek drew attention to Armatrading's "rambling, nearly ecstatic version of Let's Talk About Us from Lovers Speak, and stated that her versions of Show Some Emotion and Love and Affection on this live album are "strident and full of conviction and reverie". He concludes that Live: All the Way from America is "a sexy record, it offers listeners a soul's eye view of love and it is rendered beautifully raw and direct".

The album was rated four out of five stars by AllMusic.

== Track listing ==
All songs written and arranged by Joan Armatrading.

1. "Down to Zero" – 4:14
2. "All the Way from America" – 3:25
3. "Prove Yourself" – 4:07
4. "Physical Pain" – 4:12
5. "Tender Trap" – 4:38
6. "The Weakness in Me" – 3:53
7. "Let's Talk About Us" – 5:39
8. "Join the Boys" – 3:21
9. "Save Me" – 4:08
10. "Love and Affection" – 4:39
11. "Lovers Speak" – 5:34
12. "Rosie" – 3:58
13. "Kissin' and a Huggin'" – 5:50
14. "Me Myself I" – 4:39
15. "Willow" – 6:02
16. "Blessed" – 2:12

== Personnel ==
Musicians

- Joan Armatrading – vocals, acoustic guitar, electric guitar
- Gary Foote – flute, saxophone, drums, percussion
- Spencer Cozens – keyboards

Production

- Producer: Joan Armatrading
- Director: Joan Armatrading
- Audio Production: Joan Armatrading
- Editing: Joan Armatrading
- Engineers: Alan "Big Al" Hopkinson, Michael Cuddy
- Monitor Engineer: Erik Sanderson Evans
- Mixed by: Graham Dickson
- Stage Manager: Mark Scott
- Guitar technician: Mark Scott
- Personal Assistant: Ruth Bowditch
- Assistant: Jennifer Coia
