= Live at the Royal Albert Hall (Joan Armatrading album) =

Live album by Joan Armatrading
- Released: 22 February 2011
- Venue: Royal Albert Hall, London
- Genre: Pop
- Length: 102:33
- Label: Savoy Jazz, 429
- Producer: Joan Armatrading

Joan Armatrading chronology
This Charming Life (2010)	Live at the Royal Albert Hall (2011)	Starlight (2012)

Live at the Royal Albert Hall is a live album by the British singer-songwriter Joan Armatrading. It was recorded live on tour in 2010 and 2011, following the release of Armatrading's seventeenth studio album This Charming Life. The album was released as a digital album, CD and DVD by 429 Records / Savoy Jazz (FTN17814).

== Background ==
The CD version of Live at the Royal Albert Hall contains 15 of the 21 songs from the tour's set list, and was recorded live at the Royal Albert Hall in London. The DVD version of the album contains all 21 songs and was also recorded at the Royal Albert Hall, with additional footage of recordings from concerts in Denver, Colorado. The album presents the concert as it happened, with no overdubs or additions.

Since this album was recorded from the tour following the release of This Charming Life, many of the songs on it are from that album. Live at the Royal Albert Hall consists of six songs from This Charming Life and three songs from Into the Blues, as well as songs from Me Myself I, Show Some Emotion, The Key, Walk Under Ladders and Joan Armatrading.

== Reception ==
AllMusic's Thom Jurek observed that: "Armatrading's guitar playing has never been more agile or visceral", adding that she is "a virtuoso". He went on to describe the songs on the album as "anthemic", "soulful", "stinging" and "electrifying", drawing attention to Armatrading's "emotional depth and unique vocal phrasing", concluding that Live at the Royal Albert Hall is "the most electrifying live album in Armatrading's long career".

Allan Wilkinson of Northern Sky Magazine noted that Live at the Royal Albert Hall has "a stellar cast of musicians" and is "testament to the continued life and work of the UK's leading female singer, songwriter and guitarist".

== Track listing ==
NB: track listings vary on different versions of the CD/DVD

All songs written and arranged by Joan Armatrading.

1. "Show Some Emotion" – 3:31
2. "Something's Gotta Blow" – 8:05
3. "All the Way from America" – 4:50
4. "Two Tears" – 5:20
5. "Cry" – 4:40
6. "Promises" – 4:52
7. "Into the Blues" – 4:23
8. "A Woman in Love" – 3:56
9. "Love Love Love" – 4:03
10. "Love and Affection" – 4:29
11. "Tall in the Saddle" – 9:18
12. "My Baby's Gone" – 3:37
13. "This Charming Life" – 4:05
14. "The Weakness in Me" – 3:32
15. "Best Dress On" – 4:59
16. "Heading Back to New York City" – 5:51
17. "You Rope You Tie Me" – 4:08
18. "Call Me Names" – 4:00
19. "Me, Myself, I" – 6:23
20. "Willow" – 4:52
21. "Drop the Pilot" – 3:39

== Personnel ==
Musicians

- Joan Armatrading – vocals, acoustic guitar, electric guitar
- John Giblin – bass
- Gary Foote – saxophone, drums
- Spencer Cozens – keyboards

Production

- Producer: Joan Armatrading
- Production Manager: Roy Corkill
- Engineers: Graham Dickson, Mike Hogg
- Mixed by: Graham Dickson, Joan Armatrading
- Mastering: Tim Young
- Stage Manager: Paul Coates Allison
- Guitar technician: Paul Coates Allison
- Pro-Tools: Neil Pickles
- Photography: Alan Barrow
- Artwork: September Gestaltungskunst
