= Track Record (Joan Armatrading album) =

Greatest hits album by Joan Armatrading
- Released: 1983
- Label: A&M
- Producer: Joan Armatrading; Glyn Johns; Richard Gottehrer; Steve Lillywhite; Val Garay

Joan Armatrading chronology
The Key (1983)	Track Record (1983)	Secret Secrets (1985)

Professional ratings
Review scores
Source	Rating
AllMusic	4.5/5 stars
Christgau's Record Guide	A−

Track Record is the first greatest hits album by British singer-songwriter Joan Armatrading, released in 1983 on A&M Records.

== Album content ==
Track Record contains selected singles and album tracks from five of Armatrading's previously released studio albums—Joan Armatrading (1976), Show Some Emotion (1977), Me Myself I (1980), Walk Under Ladders (1981) and The Key (1983)—plus a track from the EP How Cruel (1979) and two new songs.

== Track listing ==
All tracks written by Joan Armatrading.

No.	Title	Origin	Length
1.	"Drop the Pilot"	The Key	3:42
2.	"(I Love It When You) Call Me Names"	The Key	3:24
3.	"Frustration"	new song	3:35
4.	"When I Get It Right"	Walk Under Ladders	2:50
5.	"I'm Lucky"	Walk Under Ladders	3:04
6.	"Me Myself I"	Me Myself I	3:16
7.	"The Weakness in Me"	Walk Under Ladders	3:32
8.	"Heaven"	new song	4:40
9.	"Down to Zero"	Joan Armatrading	3:50
10.	"Love and Affection"	Joan Armatrading	4:27
11.	"Show Some Emotion"	Show Some Emotion	3:30
12.	"Willow"	Show Some Emotion	4:03
13.	"Rosie"	How Cruel (EP)	3:10

== Personnel ==
- Joan Armatrading – production (tracks 3, 8, 13)
- Val Garay – production and engineering (track 1)
- Richard Gottehrer – production (track 6)
- Glyn Johns – production (tracks 10–12) and engineering (track 10)
- Steve Lillywhite – production (tracks 2–5, 7, 8)
- Frank de Luna – mastering
- Moshe Brakha – photography
- Michael Ross – design and art direction

== Charts ==
Chart performance for Track Record
Chart (1983)	Peak position
Australian Albums (ARIA)	4
New Zealand Albums (RMNZ)	11
UK Albums (OCC)	18
US Billboard 200	113
