= Steppin' Out (Joan Armatrading album) =

Live album by Joan Armatrading
- Released: August 1979
- Recorded: live in the US
- Genre: Pop
- Length: 42:34
- Label: A&M
- Producer: Glyn Johns

Joan Armatrading chronology
To the Limit (1978)	Steppin' Out (1979)	How Cruel (1979)

Steppin' Out is a live album by the British singer-songwriter Joan Armatrading. The title is taken from her song of the same name which was first released in 1975 on her second studio album Back to the Night. A DVD with the same title, containing concerts recorded by WDR in 1979 and 1980, was released in 2004.

== Background ==
The album was recorded live during the North American leg of her To the Limit tour and released in the UK in October 1979 by A&M (AMLH 64789). It was also released in Canada and Europe but not in the US. This is said to be because, although Armatrading was enjoying success in the States, it was felt she did not sell enough recordings there to justify a live album. However, a US issue of the album was released on CD in 2006 as a limited edition.

Armatrading's last studio album before this was To the Limit, released in July 1978, and her next would be Me Myself I, released in May 1980. The reason given for this near two-year gap between studio albums was that Armatrading was in dispute with her record company A&M during this time. According to Sean Mayes' biography of Armatrading, Armatrading was suing A&M in the American courts for $10 million, alleging that they were interfering with her attempts to negotiate a contract with a new label. A&M obtained an injunction in the UK courts preventing Armatrading from recording for any other label, and she refused to record anything for A&M until the dispute was resolved. To plug this gap between studio albums, A&M decided to release a live recording of one of her concerts from the "To the Limit" tour, and this became the Steppin' Out live album. In the end, the dispute was settled amicably and Armatrading continued her association with A&M for many more years.

The album was her final collaboration with Glyn Johns, who had produced her three previous studio albums. It features songs from her previous four studio albums, Back to the Night, Joan Armatrading, Show Some Emotion and To the Limit and also features two new songs: "How Cruel" and "Love Song". It does not include any songs from her first studio album, Whatever's for Us. According to AllMusic, the album reflects elements of blues, rock, jazz, pop and "Caribbean folk-soul".

== The songs ==
Joan Armatrading in a publicity picture during the tour that led to the "Steppin' Out" live album.

"Mama Mercy" opens the album and is a funkier version of the studio recording from Show Some Emotion, "with some unusual stops".

"Cool Blue Stole My Heart" is an extended (at over seven minutes) and blues-influenced version of the song from Back to the Night. It recalls a holiday Armatrading had in Amsterdam five years previously. Armatrading mentions during her live concert (see Steppin' Out DVD, below) that she began writing the song in Amsterdam and finished it in London three months later.

"How Cruel" is one of two new songs first featured on this album. It is the first song in which Armatrading broaches the subject of skin colour and is about being a black woman and the attitudes of some towards her in relation to this.

"Love Song" is the second new song and is only found on this album.

"Love and Affection", her first hit single, appears in a slower version on this album, with Armatrading exploring "the gospel rhythms of the vocal line".

"Steppin' Out", the title song of the album and originally found on Back to the Night, appears here in its solo version and features extended guitar work from Armatrading.

"You Rope You Tie Me" and "Kissin' And A Huggin'" are segued together in this live set.

== After the album ==
After the release of the album, Armatrading continued to tour until the end of 1979, and only stopped when she became unwell in Australia and needed a minor operation. She then took a three-month break, during which she began work on new songs. In 1979 she released an EP called How Cruel, whose title track first appeared on Steppin' Out, and in February 1980, she released the single "Rosie"/"How Cruel".

The album was produced by Armatrading and Henry Lewy; therefore the live album Steppin' Out marked the end of her collaboration with producer Glyn Johns. Armatrading said of this: "I just wanted to hear a different sound. It's like changing musicians – not because you've lost respect for the players – it's like moving on."

== Reception ==
Professional ratings
Review scores
Source	Rating
AllMusic	3.5/5 stars
The Encyclopedia of Popular Music	2/5 stars

The album received a rating of 3.5 out of 5 on AllMusic.

Armatrading's biographer Sean Mayes commented in 1990: "with a band of this calibre, performances of such commitment and fresh insight as Joan gives, plus two interesting new numbers, this is a live album which easily earns its place in the collection."

A 1979 review by Ian Penman of New Musical Express described Steppin' Out as a "standard rock and roll live album" and a "plain, depressing affair", saying of the solos in "Kissin' and a Huggin'" that "Only Richie Hayward (drums) and Bill Bodine (bass) of the five-piece band manage to avoid their respective instrumental clichés."

== Steppin' Out DVD ==
A Steppin' Out DVD was issued in 2004 by WDR. It has all the tracks from the live album except "Love Song" and many more, and lasts for 172 minutes.

The Steppin' Out DVD comprises recordings of two of Armatrading's concerts in Germany for the Rockpalast TV series: the concert on 15 February 1979 at the WDR studio in Cologne, and the concert on 19 & 20 April 1980 from the Grugahalle in Essen. The DVD also includes an interview with Armatrading, conducted in English and German. During the interview Armatrading wears the house key around her neck that was later to become the title of her studio album The Key, and is questioned about it by the interviewer.

According to the DVD sleeve notes, the two concerts give "a fascinating contrast between the earlier low-key show and the upbeat, more electric style of the later concert". The first concert was given to a small crowd and the second to a much larger one in the "vast surroundings" of the Grugahalle, reflecting Armatrading's increasing popularity and success at that time.

== Track listings ==
All songs written by Joan Armatrading

=== Steppin' Out live album, 1979 ===
==== Side 1 ====
1. "Mama Mercy" – 3:45
2. "Cool Blue Stole My Heart" – 7:12
3. "How Cruel" – 2:30
4. "Love Song" – 3:38
5. "Love and Affection" – 4:52

==== Side 2 ====
1. "Steppin' Out" – 3:31
2. "You Rope You Tie Me" – 4:36
3. "Kissin' and a Huggin'" – 5:59
4. "Tall in the Saddle" – 6.31

=== Steppin' Out DVD, 2004 ===
==== Cologne concert, 1979 ====
1. "Down to Zero"
2. "Barefoot and Pregnant"
3. "Cool Blue Stole My Heart"
4. "Baby I"
5. "Mama Mercy"
6. "Opportunity"
7. "Let it Last"
8. "Woncha Come on Home"
9. "Steppin' Out"
10. "Love and Affection"
11. "Show Some Emotion"
12. "You Rope You Tie Me"
13. "Kissin' and a Huggin'"
14. "Tall in the Saddle"
15. "Takin' My Baby Uptown"
16. "Back to the Night"
17. "Help Yourself"

=== Steppin' Out DVD, 2004 ===
==== Essen concert, 1980 ====
1. "Mama Mercy"
2. "Down to Zero"
3. "Cool Blue Stole My Heart"
4. "I Really Must Be Going"
5. "Me Myself I"
6. "Ma-Me-O-Beach"
7. "Love and Affection"
8. "Rosie"
9. "How Cruel"
10. "Turn Out the Light"
11. "You Rope You Tie Me"
12. "Kissin' and a Huggin'"
13. "Tall in the Saddle"
14. "Willow"
15. "When You Kisses Me"

== Personnel listings ==
=== Steppin' Out live album, 1979 ===
- Joan Armatrading – vocals, guitar
- Richard Hirsch – guitar
- Red Young – keyboards
- Bill Bodine – bass
- Lon Price – saxophone, flute
- Richie Hayward – drums

Technical

- Glyn Johns – producer, engineer
- Sean Fullan – assistant engineer
- Graham Thornton – sound mixer
- Mastered by: Doug Sax at The Mastering Lab
- Chick Beeson – album design
- Maggie Butler – stage logo design
- Roland Young – art direction
- Ian Peacock – lighting design
- Chris Myring – equipment manager
- John Davies – road management
- Annie Leibovitz – photography

=== Steppin' Out DVD, 2004 ===
==== 1979 Line-up: Cologne ====
- Joan Armatrading – vocals, guitar
- Richard Hirsch – guitar
- Red Young – keyboards
- Bill Bodine – bass
- Lon Price – saxophone, flute
- Art Rodriguez – drums

==== 1980 Line-up: Essen ====
- Joan Armatrading – vocals, guitar
- Richard Hirsch – guitar
- Richard Belke – guitar
- Dick Sims – keyboards
- Bill Bodine – bass
- Lon Price – saxophone, flute
- Richie Hayward – drums

== Charts ==
Chart (1979)	Peak position
Australian Albums (Kent Music Report)	23
New Zealand Albums (RMNZ)	11
