= Down to Zero =

1977 single by Joan Armatrading

Single by Joan Armatrading

from the album Joan Armatrading
- B-side: "Like Fire"
- Released: 28 January 1977
- Recorded: 1975
- Genre: Pop
- Length: 3:51
- Label: A&M
- Songwriter: Joan Armatrading
- Producer: Glyn Johns

Joan Armatrading singles chronology
"Love and Affection" (1976)	"Down to Zero" (1977)	"Willow" (1977)

Official audio
- "Down To Zero" on YouTube

"Down to Zero" is a song by the British singer-songwriter Joan Armatrading that was issued as a single in January 1977. It features pedal steel guitar by B. J. Cole and drums by Kenney Jones of the Faces.

== Writing ==
Armatrading wrote the lyrics of "Down to Zero" first, then wrote the music on the piano. She was inspired lyrically by her observations on "lots of people I knew [who were] splitting up or divorcing" and how "all the women were having the same reaction". She explained to Musician in 1982, "They were all sort of thinking, 'Well, it's the way I look.' None of them were thinking rationally, none of them thought: 'Well, maybe I can't cook, or maybe I'm too lazy,' it was all suddenly down to how they looked. And I could really understand that. I knew they were wrong, but I also knew that if it were me in the same situation, I'd probably feel and think exactly the same."

== History ==
The song first appeared on Armatrading's 1976 album Joan Armatrading, which was produced and engineered by Glyn Johns and recorded at the independent Olympic Studios in Barnes, London. It was the first song to be recorded for the album. "Down to Zero" was released as a single by A&M on 28 January, 1977 with "Like Fire" on the b-side. Despite following the success of the Top 10 single "Love and Affection" (which had been released in August 1976), it failed to chart.

In his review of the album on AllMusic, Dave Connolly cites "Down to Zero" as "[one of] the album's most memorable tracks". Women's music writer Lucy O'Brien described the song as "a full-tilt rollercoaster ... a masterly analysis of rejection." Critic Wilfrid Mellers, in his book Angels of the Night, praised the song's "jazz intensity", achieved he says, through its "triplet cross-rhythms".

"Down to Zero" has since been re-released on numerous collections, among them: Live at the Bijou Bijou Club, Philadelphia Superstar Radio Network (1977, promo album); Track Record (1983), Joan Armatrading: Greatest Hits (1987), Joan Armatrading: 25th Anniversary Series (1987), The Very Best of Joan Armatrading (1991), Love And Affection (1996), Joan Armatrading: Master Series# (1999); Joan Armatrading: Millennium Edition (2000); The Best of Joan Armatrading: The Millennium Collection (2000); Joan Armatrading: Best (2001); Classic Joan Armatrading (2001); Love and Affection: Joan Armatrading Classics 1975–1983 (2003); Live: All the Way from America (2004); Joan Armatrading: Gold (2005).

"Down to Zero" was re-released in July 1990 as a live version on the B-side of the single "Promise Land" (AM 567) from the album Hearts and Flowers.

The single's B-side, "Like Fire", also appears on the Joan Armatrading album.

"Down to Zero" was used as the theme song for the BBC series Nurse in 2015.

== Critical reception ==
Upon its release as a single, Steve Clarke of the NME praised "Down to Zero" as a "majestic ballad shot through with the ice and fire one expects from Joan, with her characteristic shimmering piano overlaid with acoustic strumming". He did, however, question its suitability as a single rather than an album cut, noting that it has an "attractive cool arrogance but isn't one of her most well formed songs in terms of melody".

== Personnel ==
- Joan Armatrading – vocals, acoustic guitar
- Jerry Donahue – acoustic & electric guitars
- Dave Markee – bass guitar
- B. J. Cole – steel guitar
- Graham Lyle – 12-string guitar
- Peter Wood – piano
- Kenney Jones – drums

== Performances ==
During the 1970s, Armatrading used the song to open her live concerts, as noted in contemporary reviews. She used "Down to Zero" to open her seminal concert for German TV (Studio L in Cologne) on 15 February 1979, accompanied by a band especially put together for the tour. The band featured Red Young on keyboards, Rick Hirsch on guitar, Art Rodriguez on drums, Bill Bodine on bass and Lon Price on saxophone. The concert was recorded by WDR and features on the DVD Steppin' Out. Armatrading played the song again, this time as the second opener, with the same band, live at the Rockpalast in Grugahalle, Essen, Germany on 19 and 20 April 1980, in another concert recorded live and featuring on the Steppin' Out DVD. It was during the fourteen months between these two concerts that she became internationally famous, and "Down to Zero" helped her to achieve this. The band that played with her at these concerts went on to perform with her on subsequent tours.

On 5 October 1976 Armatrading performed the song on BBC's The Old Grey Whistle Test, introduced by Bob Harris.

Armatrading has included the song in many of her shows, almost as often as her top 10 hit "Love and Affection". She played it on her live concert tour for her 2003 album Lovers Speak; recordings from that tour were released on the CD/DVD album Live: All the Way from America in 2004. Following this she rested the song, until including it once again in her 2012 Starlight tour.

On 27 April 2016, Armatrading was presented with a Lifetime Achievement Award at the BBC Radio 2 Folk Awards at the Royal Albert Hall in London, and played "Down to Zero" at the ceremony.

== Covers ==
"Down to Zero" was recorded by soul and blues singer Bettye LaVette and issued on her 2005 album I've Got My Own Hell to Raise.

The song was also recorded by Lili Añel and issued on her 2007 album Dream Again and later also released, by ESC Records, on her album Life or Death.

The American singer Melissa Etheridge regularly covered the song live when she appeared in clubs in California in the 1980s – one of many Armatrading songs she included in her live repertoire.

The Irish singer Freddie White performed "Down to Zero" in concert, and his rendition can be found on his 1979 live album Recorded Live on Tour 1978.
