= Heaven (Joan Armatrading song) =

1983 single by Joan Armatrading

Single by Joan Armatrading

from the album Track Record
- B-side: "Back to the Night"
- Released: 18 November 1983
- Length: 4:40 (album version); 3:24 (single version)
- Label: A&M
- Songwriter: Joan Armatrading
- Producers: Joan Armatrading; Steve Lillywhite

Joan Armatrading singles chronology
"(I Love It When You) Call Me Names" (1983)	"Heaven" (1983)	"Frustration" (1983)

Audio
- "Heaven" on YouTube

"Heaven" is a song by English singer-songwriter Joan Armatrading, released on 18 November 1983 by A&M Records as the first single from her first compilation album, Track Record (1983). The song was written by Armatrading and was produced by Armatrading and Steve Lillywhite.

== Release ==
"Heaven" was released as a single in the UK on 18 November 1983. It failed to reach the top 100 of the UK singles chart, but did gain airplay across Independent Local Radio. It spent four consecutive weeks in Music Week magazine's Airplay Action listings as one of 75 "most playlisted records in the UK".

== Critical reception ==
Upon its release as a single, James Belsey of the Bristol Evening Post picked "Heaven" as the newspaper's "single of the week" and wrote, "The lady sounds as good as she's ever done with a great drum sound behind her on this tough, incisive piece of rock." Lenny Juviski of The Northern Echo stated, "Raunchy R&B number swirls up and down Joan's immense vocal range. Slow at first but takes off into her best yet." Joanne Sweeney of the Lurgan Mail praised it as "beautiful" and recommended readers to "keep listening and it'll grow on you". Lucy Patton of the Bracknell Times called it a "great song", with Armatrading's voice "amazingly effective". She added, "Although it seems at first to be another slow one, the tempo varies, but never rises to the same pace as 'Drop the Pilot'. Devoted fans will not be disappointed." Tony Jasper of Music Week noted the "powerful vocal projection" and "sympathetic musical colouring rather than an insistent riff or memorable melody [to] win [it] through".

Eleanor Levy of Record Mirror felt "Heaven" was "too plodding to follow 'Drop the Pilot' into the charts and too shallow to choke the way 'Willow' always can", but added "it's impossible to say anything but good about such a strong and talented woman". Sunie, writing for Number One, called the single "pointless". She wrote, "If this is intended to give a fillip to the Track Record LP, A&M would have done better to reissue one of Joan's corking almost-hits such as 'Me Myself I'. There seems no other reason for putting this drab ballad out as a single." Frank Edmonds of the Bury Free Press gave the song a 3 out of 10 rating, criticising it for being "such a grim, wailing dirge [that] it sounds more like down below than up above". John Mahoney, writing for the Telegraph & Argus, was also negative in his review, stating that it was a "big disappointment" and "definitely not single material".

== Track listings ==
7–inch single (UK, South Africa and Australia)

1. "Heaven" – 4:40
2. "Back to the Night" (remix) – 4:04

7–inch single (US)

1. "Heaven" – 4:40
2. "Frustration" – 3:35

== Personnel ==
Production

- Joan Armatrading – production ("Heaven", "Frustration")
- Steve Lillywhite – production ("Heaven", "Frustration"), remixing ("Back to the Night")
- Peter Gage – production ("Back to the Night")

Other

- Moshe Brakha – photography
