= Starlight (Joan Armatrading album) =

Studio album by Joan Armatrading
- Released: 28 May 2012
- Recorded: Bumpkin Studios
- Genre: Jazz, Pop
- Length: 40:05
- Label: 429, Hypertension
- Producer: Joan Armatrading

Joan Armatrading chronology
| Live at the Royal Albert Hall (2011) | Starlight (2012) | The Tempest Songs (2016) |

Starlight is the eighteenth studio album by British singer-songwriter Joan Armatrading, and was released in 2012 as a digital album on the Hypertension label, (HYP 12287) and then as a CD in 2013 on the 429 Records (FTN 17925) and Savoy labels. The album was recorded at Bumpkin Studios, Armatrading's own purpose-built studio.

== Background ==
Starlight was recorded during 2011 and is the final album in a trilogy of albums by Armatrading each concerned with a specific musical genre. The first two albums, Into the Blues and This Charming Life, focused on blues and rock music respectively, and Starlight was written as an "out and out jazz album". The idea of writing three albums concerned with specific genres grew out of Armatrading's 2003 album Lovers Speak.

Armatrading produced the album, wrote and arranged all the songs and plays all the instruments.

== Reception ==
James Christopher Monger of AllMusic commented that Starlight "offers up a luxurious set of new originals [and] skilfully bridges the gap between the smooth folk-pop of Show Some Emotion, the amorous candor of Lovers Speak, and the evocative cool of Into the Blues".

Bass Guitar magazine said that Starlight is: "a sterling effort from the veteran songwriter ... and features high quality bass playing as well as top-notch songs".

The Scottish Daily Express commented in May 2012 that "Starlight has a jazzier feel than previous offerings ... and [Armatrading's] ability to adapt is what sets her up as one of the finest female singer-songwriters this country's produced".

== Track listing ==
All songs written and arranged by Joan Armatrading.

1. "Single Life" – 3:50
2. "Close To Me" – 3:57
3. "Tell Me" – 4:52
4. "Back on Track" – 3:51
5. "I Want That Love" – 4:30
6. "The Way I Think of You" – 2:57
7. "Always on My Mind" – 3:51
8. "Starlight" – 3:47
9. "Busy With You" – 4:44
10. "Summer Kisses" – 3:56

== Personnel ==
Musicians

- Joan Armatrading – vocals, acoustic guitar, electric guitar, bass, keyboards, keyboard horns, keyboard strings, drum programming

Production

- Producer: Joan Armatrading
- Arranger: Joan Armatrading
- Mixed by: Graham Dickson
- Mastered by: Tim Young
- Photography: Michael Robert Williams
