= Lonely Girl =

Lonely Girl may refer to:

== Music ==
=== Albums ===
- Lonely Girl (album), a 1956 album by Julie London
- Lonely Girl (Jackie DeShannon album), album by Jackie DeShannon, or its title track

=== Songs ===
- "Lonely Girl", a song by Dala from Everyone Is Someone, 2009
- "Lonely Girl", a song by Emmylou Harris from Hard Bargain, 2011
- "Lonely Girl", a song by Pink from Missundaztood, 2001
- "Lonely Girl", a song by Sandi Thom from Smile... It Confuses People, 2006
- "Lonely Girl", a song by Timothy B. Schmit from Playin' It Cool, 1984
- "Lonely Girl", a song by Tonight Alive, released in 2013
- "Lonely Girl" (Weezer song), released in 2014
- "Lonely Girls", a song by Lucinda Williams from Essence, 2001
- "Lonely Girls", a song by Suede on their 2002 album A New Morning

== See also ==
- "Hey There Lonely Girl", a 1963 song recorded by Eddie Holman
- "Lonely Lady", a 1973 song by Joan Armatrading
- The Lonely Lady, a 1983 film starring Pia Zadora
