= How Cruel =

EP by Joan Armatrading
- Released: November 1979
- Studio: Morgan (London, UK); A&M (Hollywood, California)
- Genre: Pop, reggae
- Label: A&M
- Producer: Joan Armatrading, Henry Lewy

Joan Armatrading chronology
Steppin' Out (1979)	How Cruel (1979)	Me Myself I (1980)

Professional ratings
Review scores
Source	Rating
AllMusic	3/5 stars

How Cruel is a 12-inch one-sided EP by British singer-songwriter Joan Armatrading, which was released in November 1979 on A&M. The title track had previously appeared on Armatrading's live album Steppin' Out, which was not released in the US. The EP was released in the US and elsewhere, but not in the UK. It made it to number 10 on the Dutch Album Top 100 and peaked at #19 on the Norwegian Albums Chart. It was nominated for the Grammy Award for Best Female Rock Vocal Performance at the 23rd Annual Grammy Awards in 1981. The single from this EP was "Rosie"/"How Cruel" (1979/1980), which reached #49 in the UK and #52 in Australia. "Rosie" was included on Armatrading's first compilation album, 1983's Track Record, as well as her top ten 1991 compilation, The Very Best of Joan Armatrading, and her 2004 live album Live: All the Way from America. All four tracks from this EP were placed at the start of the second CD of Armatrading's 2003 compilation album Love and Affection: Joan Armatrading Classics (1975–1983).

== Track listing ==
All tracks composed by Joan Armatrading.

1. "Rosie" – 3:10
2. "How Cruel" – 3:04
3. "He Wants Her" – 3:15
4. "I Really Must Be Going" – 4:27

== Personnel ==
- Joan Armatrading – lead vocals, acoustic guitar
- Richard Hirsch, Winston Delandro – guitar
- Ben Adkins, Bill Bodine, Durban Betancourt-Laverde – bass
- James Lascelles, Mike Storey, Red Young – keyboards
- Gary Mallaber, Richard Bailey – drums
- Lon Price – saxophone on "How Cruel"

Technical

- Henry Lewy, Skip Cottrell, Chris Tsangarides – engineers

== Charts ==
=== Weekly charts ===
Chart (1980)	Peak position
Dutch Albums (Album Top 100)	10
Norwegian Albums (VG-lista)	19

=== Year-end charts ===
Chart (1980)	Position
Dutch Albums (Album Top 100)	90

== Sales and certifications ==
Certifications for How Cruel
Region	Certification	Certified units/sales
Netherlands (NVPI)	Gold	50,000^{^}
^{^} Shipments figures based on certification alone.
