= Not Too Far Away =

Studio album by Joan Armatrading
- Released: 18 May 2018
- Studio: Bumpkin Studios, England
- Length: 39:22
- Label: BMG
- Producer: Joan Armatrading

Joan Armatrading chronology
Me Myself I World Tour (2016)	Not Too Far Away (2018)	Consequences (2021)

Not Too Far Away is the nineteenth studio album by British singer-songwriter Joan Armatrading, and was released on 18 May 2018. Armatrading produced the album herself, arranged the strings and plays and programmed all instruments. The album peaked at no.30 in the UK, Armatrading's first studio album to reach the Top 30 since Hearts and Flowers in 1990.

== Background ==
Armatrading signed to BMG in 2018, and this was her first album for the label. She announced touring dates for the album through her website. The tour commenced on 27 May 2018 in the US and continued in the UK from 10 September 2018.

== Reception ==
AllMusic reviewer Timothy Monger noted Armatrading's "heartfelt melodies", "quality songs" and "smartly crafted [...] pop" and praised her "consistent creative expression", giving special mention to the tracks "I Like It When We're Together" and "This Is Not That". He concluded by giving the album four out of five stars, calling Armatrading's achievements "genuinely impressive".

ON Magazine's David Schuster called Not Too Far Away "an astonishing album, with beautifully written songs", and "exquisite". He gave the album nine out of ten and suggested that, following this album, Armatrading should be considered for a Brit Awards Lifetime Achievement Award.

PopMatters described the album as "vibrant, perky and totally committed, characterized by rock nous and pop sensibility".

Digital Journal called the album "compelling" and a "well-crafted musical project", drawing attention to Armatrading's "sultry vocals" – which the reviewer referred to as "crystalline and bluesy". The album was given an A rating.

== Track listing ==
1. "I Like It When We're Together" – 3:37
2. "Still Waters" – 4:13
3. "No More Pain" – 3:36
4. "Cover My Eyes" – 3:54
5. "Invisible (Blue Light)" – 3:56
6. "Not Too Far Away" – 4:29
7. "Any Place" – 3:58
8. "Always in My Dreams" – 3:53
9. "This Is Not That" – 3:32
10. "Loving What You Hate" – 4:14

== Personnel ==
Musicians

- Joan Armatrading – vocals, guitars, drum programming, instrumentation, string arrangements
- City of Prague Philharmonic Orchestra – orchestra
- Richard Hein – conductor
- Andrew Skeet – orchestrator

Production

- Producer: Joan Armatrading
- Engineer: Joan Armatrading
- Arranger: Joan Armatrading
- Mixing: Mark Wallis
- Master engineer: Mark Wallis
- Orchestra contractor: James Fitzpatrick
- Photography: Joel Anderson

== Charts ==
Chart (2018)	Peak position
Scottish Albums (OCC)	11
UK Albums (OCC)	30
