= Consequences (Joan Armatrading album) =

Studio album by Joan Armatrading
- Released: 18 June 2021
- Studio: Bumpkin Studios, Surrey
- Length: 34:37
- Label: BMG
- Producer: Joan Armatrading

Joan Armatrading chronology
Not Too Far Away (2018)	Consequences (2021)	Live at Asylum Chapel (2022)

Singles from Consequences
- 1. "Already There" Released: 5 May 2021

Consequences is the twentieth studio album by British singer-songwriter Joan Armatrading, released on 18 June 2021 by BMG Rights Management. The album peaked at number 10 on the UK Albums Chart, her highest placement since The Very Best of Joan Armatrading (1991). The album was written and produced solely by Armatrading herself.

== Background ==
In an interview with Forbes, Armatrading said that the album received its title from the recurring topic of consequences she would often discuss with others about: "I'm always saying things to people like, "You've got to realize the consequences of what you're doing." Even really mundane things, you think you're doing this thing. Something happens in the midst of doing that thing that causes you to veer off into a whole different angle that you didn't realize was going to happen."

== Promotion ==
Consequences was announced on 5 May 2021 for release on 18 June 2021, with the lead single "Already There" being released the same day as the announcement. An official video for the song was released on 20 May.

== Critical reception ==
Upon its release, Consequences received positive reviews from music critics. Alexis Petridis of The Guardian rated the album four out of five stars; he wrote about the album's diverse sounds and instrumentation utilization and concluded his review by writing: "A critical elevation of her work would be welcome and just, but it’s worth pointing out that Armatrading herself seems perfectly content where she is." Lee Zimmerman of American Songwriter also gave the album four out of five stars, writing that the album "offers no shortage of rhythm-ready offerings, which ensure the enthusiasm remains at a constant peak."

== Track listing ==
All tracks are written by Joan Armatrading.

No.	Title	Length
1.	"Natural Rhythm"	3:34
2.	"Already There"	3:42
3.	"To Be Loved"	3:17
4.	"Better Life"	3:20
5.	"Glorious Madness"	3:14
6.	"Like"	3:03
7.	"Consequences"	4:48
8.	"Sunrise" (instrumental)	3:07
9.	"Think About Me"	3:00
10.	"To Anyone Who Will Listen"	3:36
Total length:		34:37

== Charts ==
Chart (2021)	Peak position
UK Albums (OCC)	10
UK Independent Albums (OCC)	3
Scottish Albums (OCC)	3
Switzerland Albums Chart	72
