= All the Way from America =

1980 single by Joan Armatrading

Single by Joan Armatrading

from the album Me Myself I
- B-side: "Is It Tomorrow Yet"
- Released: August 1980
- Length: 4:49 (album version); 3:59 (single version)
- Label: A&M
- Songwriter: Joan Armatrading
- Producer: Richard Gottehrer

Joan Armatrading singles chronology
"Me Myself I" (1980)	"All the Way from America" (1980)	"Simon" (1980)

Audio
- "All the Way from America" on YouTube

"All the Way from America" is a song by English singer-songwriter Joan Armatrading, released in August 1980 by A&M Records as the second single from her sixth studio album, Me Myself I (1980). The song was written by Armatrading and produced by Richard Gottehrer. It reached number 54 in the UK singles chart.

== Background ==
"All the Way from America" is about someone receiving a transatlantic telephone call from their lover who promises they will be reunited soon but fails to arrive. Armatrading was inspired to write the song based on a personal experience in her private life. She told Songfacts in 2015, "[There] was somebody in America who was trying to persuade me to go out with them and would call all the way from America when I got back to the UK."

== Release ==
"All the Way from America" followed Armatrading's UK top 30 hit with "Me Myself I". Although it did not replicate the success of its predecessor, stalling at number 54 in the UK singles chart, "All the Way from America" generated strong airplay on UK radio. It peaked at number 13 on Record Business magazine's Airplay Guide 100.

== Critical reception ==
Upon its release, David Hepworth of Smash Hits wrote, "Distinguished by drumming which is the last word in rhythmic emphasis and a restrained but evocative arrangement, this is Joan's least forced single since 'Down to Zero'. There's no trace of fabricated funk here; just a beautiful lyric, a spellbinding vocal performance, the best of which is brought out by a guitar hook that lifts the whole record effortlessly. Splendid stuff." Lenny Juviski of The Northern Echo praised the song as a "superb, top quality classic" that he believed "would stroll easily to the number one spot if everyone hadn't already got the album". A reviewer for the Manchester Evening News remarked that the "superb track deserves to be a smash". James Belsey of the Bristol Evening Post picked it as the newspaper's "single of the week", calling it a "marvellous piece of music, ending with a memorable crescendo".

Jim Whiteford of The Kilmarnock Standard believed Armatrading "should reach the top five with this addictive pop/rock number which builds so naturally throughout and features some splendid spine-chilling Duane Eddy-type guitar twangs". Mike Gardner of Record Mirror called it "pleasant aural wallpaper from an artist who has lost the fragile and endearing nervousness that made her so compulsive". Paul Francis of the Worcester Evening News considered the "fine single" to be Armatrading's best since "Down to Zero". He noted the "clear American influences", but felt the "backing band are kept from stealing the limelight". He was critical of the strings as they "tend to be a bit intrusive towards the end and aren't really necessary".

In the US, Cash Box stated that Armatrading "blends folk and rock styles effortlessly into a fresh blend of the acoustic and electric, with powerful orchestral backing". They also noted how her "soulfully distinctive vocals add an emotional depth rarely found in rock or pop". Record World concluded, "The poetic theme and Joan's typically affecting vocals are decorated with a twangy guitar line and emphatic percussion while the chorus hook is aimed at AOR-pop. It should be the track that finally breaks Joan on pop radio."

== Live performances ==
Armatrading's 2004 live album Live: All the Way from America, which was recorded at a concert in the US in Saratoga, California, takes its title from this song, which also appeared on Armatrading's 2011 album Live at the Royal Albert Hall.

== Track listing ==
7–inch single (UK, Europe and Australasia)

1. "All the Way from America" – 3:59
2. "Is It Tomorrow Yet" – 3:31

7–inch single (US)

1. "All the Way from America" (edit) – 3:07
2. "Is It Tomorrow Yet" – 3:31

7–inch single (South Africa)

1. "All the Way from America" (LP version) – 4:49
2. "Is It Tomorrow Yet" – 3:31

== Personnel ==
Production

- Richard Gottehrer – production
- Thom Panunzio – engineering
- Gregg Caruso – engineering assistance
- Greg Calbi – mastering

Other

- Brian Hagiwara – front cover photography
- Anton Corbijn – back cover photography

== Charts ==
Chart (1980)	Peak position
UK Singles (OCC)	54
UK Airplay Guide 100 (Record Business)	13
