= Rosie (Joan Armatrading song) =

1980 single by Joan Armatrading

Single by Joan Armatrading

from the album How Cruel
- B-side: "How Cruel"
- Released: 1 February 1980
- Length: 3:10
- Label: A&M
- Songwriter: Joan Armatrading
- Producer: Joan Armatrading

Joan Armatrading singles chronology
"Steppin' Out" (1979)	"Rosie" (1980)	"He Wants Her" (1980)

"Rosie" is a song by English singer-songwriter Joan Armatrading, released on 1 February 1980 by A&M Records. It originally appeared as the first track on Armatrading's 1979 EP How Cruel. The song, which was written and produced by Armatrading, reached number 49 in the UK singles chart.

== Writing ==
"Rosie" was inspired by the cross-dressers that Armatrading saw on 42nd Street in the New York City borough of Manhattan. After she saw someone off at the airport, Armatrading took a taxi back into New York City. The young driver asked her if she had seen much of the city, to which she replied that she had not. He then offered to show her a few sites for no extra charge, one of which was 42nd Street. Armatrading recalled to y!entertainment in 2021, "42nd Street had a whole bunch of young men in their dresses and their high heels and their lipstick and their hair all up and everything. And I loved it. I thought it looked great." Armatrading then wrote "Rosie" by imagining up a story about the life of one of the young men she had seen.

== Recording ==
"Rosie" was Armatrading's first recording following an operation she underwent in 1979 to remove non-malignant tumours from her stomach. The surgery left her music career on hold for about three months while she recovered. Speaking of the song to the Sandwell Evening Mail in 1980, Armatrading said, "I felt the need to record and went down to the studio to do 'Rosie'. It was just a spur of the moment thing. It's the happiest thing and the most instant record I've ever recorded." The song was recorded at Morgan Studios in London.

== Release ==
"Rosie" first appeared on Armatrading's extended play How Cruel, which was released in November 1979 in the United States, Canada, Australia and Europe. When Jerry Moss, the chairman of A&M Records, heard "Rosie", he suggested Armatrading record a few more songs and then release them as an extended play, to which she agreed as she wasn't ready to do an entire new album. Although Armatrading also wanted "Rosie" to have been released as a single in the US, A&M Records decided against giving it a commercial release as they felt the EP price already represented good value for money. They did, however, issue "Rosie" as a promotional single to promote the EP. Despite this initial stance, A&M later released "He Wants Her" as a single from the EP in February 1980 based on the reaction it was receiving at the time.

Due to the recent release of her live album Steppin' Out, How Cruel was not released in the UK and "Rosie" was released as a single there instead on 1 February 1980. It was also released as a single in Australia, New Zealand and certain European territories a couple of months later. In the UK, "Rosie" peaked at number 49 and was Armatrading's second appearance in the UK singles chart, following "Love and Affection" in 1976.

== Critical reception ==
Upon its release as a single, Jim Whiteford of the Kilmarnock Standard stated, "Blending jazz, rock and pop, Armatrading treats us to a catchy thing which relates how Rosie winds all the boys up then leaves them flat. Easily the most commercial she's come through with for a couple of years and a top twenty cert!" Paul Walker of the Sandwell Evening Mail praised it as a "lovely song" that is "more reggae-influenced than her previous work, but beautifully sung with catchy verse". Mike Pryce of the Worcester Evening News did not think the "tough, aggressive song" would make it as a hit single, but he commented that Armatrading had "not lost her touch for making quality music".

== Live performances ==
"Rosie" was performed live as early as July 1979. Armatrading later recounted how "Rosie" was popular with audiences at her concerts. It appeared on her 2004 live album Live: All the Way from America.

== Track listings ==
7–inch single (UK, Europe and South Africa)

1. "Rosie" – 3:10
2. "How Cruel" – 3:04

7–inch single (Australasia)

1. "Rosie" – 3:10
2. "He Wants Her" – 3:15

== Personnel ==
Production

- Joan Armatrading – production (all tracks)
- Henry Lewy – production ("How Cruel", "He Wants Her")
- Chris Tsangarides – engineering ("Rosie")

Other

- Mark Hanauer – photography

== Charts ==
Chart (1980)	Peak position
Australia (Kent Music Report)	52
Belgium (Ultratop 50 Flanders)	27
Netherlands (Dutch Top 40)	15
Netherlands (Single Top 100)	19
New Zealand (Recorded Music NZ)	33
UK Singles (OCC)	49
