= How Did This Happen and What Does It Now Mean =

Studio album by Joan Armatrading
- Released: 22 November 2024
- Length: 39:45
- Label: BMG
- Producer: Joan Armatrading

Joan Armatrading chronology
Live at Asylum Chapel (2022)	How Did This Happen and What Does It Now Mean (2024)

Singles from How Did This Happen and What Does It Now Mean
- 1. "I'm Not Moving" Released: 2 October 2024; 2. "Someone Else" Released: 25 October 2024; 3. "25 Kisses" Released: 31 January 2025

How Did This Happen and What Does It Now Mean is the twenty-first studio album by British singer-songwriter Joan Armatrading. The album was released on 22 November 2024 by BMG Rights Management. It was produced solely by Armatrading. A music video for the album's first single, "I'm Not Moving", was released on 2 October 2024.

== Track listing ==
All tracks are written by Joan Armatrading.

How Did This Happen and What Does It Now Mean track listing
No.	Title	Length
1.	"25 Kisses"	3:05
2.	"Someone Else"	3:15
3.	"Irresistible"	3:18
4.	"I'm Not Moving"	3:36
5.	"Say It Tomorrow"	3:42
6.	"Back and Forth"	4:17
7.	"Come Back to Me (If Only in Dreams)"	2:56
8.	"Here's What I Know"	3:37
9.	"Redemption Love"	2:24
10.	"How Did This Happen and What Does It Now Mean"	3:41
11.	"Now What"	1:42
12.	"I Gave You My Keys"	4:12
Total length:		39:45

== Personnel ==
- Joan Armatrading – lead vocals, backing vocals, drum programming, guitar, keyboards, piano, production, mixing, engineering
- Mark Dobson – engineering
- Mark Wallis – engineering

== Charts ==
Chart performance for How Did This Happen and What Does It Now Mean
Chart (2024)	Peak position
Scottish Albums (OCC)	13
UK Albums (OCC)	69
UK Independent Albums (OCC)	6
