= To the Limit (album) =

Studio album by Joan Armatrading
- Released: 29 September 1978
- Recorded: 1978
- Studio: Olympic (London)
- Genre: Pop
- Length: 41:12
- Label: A&M
- Producer: Glyn Johns

Joan Armatrading chronology
Show Some Emotion (1977)	To the Limit (1978)	Steppin' Out (1979)

Singles from To the Limit
- 1. "Bottom to the Top" Released: 10 November 1978; 2. "Barefoot and Pregnant" Released: January 1979

To the Limit is the fifth studio album by British singer-songwriter Joan Armatrading, released in September 1978 by A&M.

== Background ==
The album was Armatrading's third and final studio collaboration with producer Glyn Johns. It was recorded at Olympic Studios in the London suburb of Barnes and mastered at The Mastering Lab, Los Angeles. To the Limit marks a departure from her previous work, as she wanted to move away from the formal sound of a studio album and aim more for the feel of a live performance while retaining the quality of a studio. To this end, she used half the number of musicians she previously had, used a live studio band, and kept overdubs to a minimum.

Dave Markee and Henry Spinetti stayed on from Armatrading's previous album Show Some Emotion while Red Young and Quitman Dennis joined from her live band and Dick Sims from Eric Clapton's band. Phil Palmer had previously worked with David Bowie and Frank Zappa, and is the nephew of Ray and Dave Davies of The Kinks.

Annie Leibovitz, who did the photography, was the first woman to photograph Armatrading for an album cover. The pictures show Joan relaxing at her home, which was then in Sutton. Leibovitz spent four days with Joan at her home to capture the pictures.

To the Limit is an "aspects of love" album with the songs being a series of letters or private conversations addressed to the lover, and it reached number 13 in the British album chart. Armatrading did not tour following its release, the first time she had not done so.

== The songs ==
"Bottom to the Top" was Armatrading's first flirtation with reggae (although there were reggae influences on Show Some Emotion) and the song arose from hearing some records which her younger brother had. She wanted to get as close to an authentic sound as possible, so the song was recorded in one take.

"Barefoot and Pregnant" was written after a conversation with her agent, during which Armatrading heard the expression "barefoot and pregnant"; used in the women's movement at the time. She was intrigued by the expression and wanted to write a song with that title.

The idea for "Your Letter" arose from a conversation Armatrading had with the American singer Bonnie Raitt who described finding a letter "she shouldn't have seen".

"Taking My Baby Up Town" extends the theme of the song "Kissin' and a Huggin'" from Show Some Emotion and it was put to Armatrading by Penny Valentine of Melody Maker that the song was about gay relationships, though she denied this was the case.

The song "Wishing" is a blues influenced number and was described by Armatrading as "the first bit of poetry I've ever written".

"Let It Last" is influenced by country and gospel music.

The songs "Bottom to the Top", "Barefoot and Pregnant", "You Rope You Tie Me" and "Your Letter" have subsequently appeared on compilation albums. "Barefoot and Pregnant", "Bottom to the Top" and "Takin' My Baby Uptown" were released as singles. "You Rope You Tie Me", "Barefoot and Pregnant" and "Takin' My Baby Uptown" were included in the set list for Armatrading's seminal concert at the Rockpalast in Cologne in 1979. "You Rope You Tie Me" was included on Armatrading's 1979 live album Steppin' Out.

== Reception ==
Professional ratings
Review scores
Source	Rating
AllMusic	3.5/5 stars
Christgau's Record Guide	B+
The Encyclopedia of Popular Music	3/5 stars
Record Mirror	5/5 stars
The Rolling Stone Album Guide	3.5/5 stars

The album was critically well received and made it to number 13 in the UK Albums Chart, and number 42 on the Australian Kent Music Report albums chart.

Reviewing for Record Mirror, Geoff Travis gave the album 5 out of 5, writing that Armatrading "provides a vocabulary that is full of feeling and understanding and infused with her own character that is streets ahead of her rivals in articulating her emotions In a rock and roll song" and lauded her as "without doubt one of the greatest artists that there is making music at the moment. The fact that she is one of the least pretentious and one of the most courageous people without courting the sensationalist press that she could count on if she were to be more explicit about the meaning of many of her songs, does nothing but enhance her stature as a writer, singer and artist." Phil Sutcliffe for Sounds summed up that "musically To The Limit is a small step within Joan's known area of excellence. It's very satisfying but there could be something more radical next time. In terms of lyrics though this is her most potent collection yet."

Reviewing retrospectively for AllMusic, Dave Connolly described it as "one of her better albums", stating that "nothing on To the Limit is great, but nearly everything is good".

== Influence ==
Singer-songwriter Fiona Apple identified the album as a major influence on her. In an interview with Pitchfork in 2020, Apple stated that "if I had to pick one record that’s closest to me from when I was a kid, it’s To the Limit. I feel like it influenced me a lot...I love her singing style, I love her voice, I love the way she says things. I got really hooked in by the song “You Rope You Tie Me” ...it was her performance of that song that I was like: “I really hear this woman. She’s getting through to me.”

== Track listing ==
All songs written by Joan Armatrading.

Side one

1. "Barefoot and Pregnant" 3:40
2. "Your Letter" 3:40
3. "Am I Blue for You" 4:24
4. "You Rope You Tie Me" 4:08
5. "Baby I" 4:52

Side two

1. "Bottom to the Top" 3:34
2. "Taking My Baby Up Town" 3:25
3. "What Do You Want" 3:44
4. "Wishing" 4:48
5. "Let It Last" 4:57

== Personnel ==
Musicians

- Joan Armatrading – vocals, acoustic guitar
- Red Young – piano
- Phil Palmer – electric guitar
- Dave Markee – bass guitar
- Dick Sims – organ, accordion
- Quitman Dennis – saxophone, flute, lyricon
- Henry Spinetti – drums

Production

- Producer & Engineer: Glyn Johns
- Mastering Engineer: Doug Sax
- Art Direction: Michael Ross
- Design: Nick Marshall
- Photography: Annie Leibovitz

== Charts ==
Chart (1978)	Peak position
Australian Albums (Kent Music Report)	42
Norwegian Albums (VG-lista)	13
New Zealand Albums (RMNZ)	21
UK Albums (OCC)	13
US Billboard 200	125
