= Into the Blues =

Studio album by Joan Armatrading
- Released: 1 May 2007
- Recorded: Bumpkin Studios
- Genre: Blues, Pop
- Length: 58:28
- Label: 429, Hypertension
- Producer: Joan Armatrading

Joan Armatrading chronology
Live: All the Way from America (2004)	Into the Blues (2007)	This Charming Life (2010)

Into the Blues is the sixteenth studio album by British singer-songwriter Joan Armatrading, released on 1 May 2007. The album was recorded by Armatrading at Bumpkin Studios, her own purpose-built studios. It was released on the 429 label (17625) and on the Hypertension label (HYP 7255). The album was released in 2008 as a deluxe edition, with a DVD.

== Background ==
Into the Blues was the first of a trilogy of albums by Armatrading each concerned with a specific genre of music. She wrote and produced three albums focused on blues, rock and jazz music, respectively. She described Into the Blues as "the CD I've been promising myself to write for a long time". Writing a whole album in one genre was a departure for Armatrading, as all her previous albums had an eclectic mix of influences from many genres. Blues-inspired music features on many Armatrading albums, as far back as her 1976 album Joan Armatrading, though Into the Blues is her first album to concentrate solely on the blues genre. Armatrading wrote and arranged all the songs on the album and plays all the instruments except for drums and percussion. She also produced and co-engineered the album.

The track "D.N.A." was released as an extended play single, also in 2007. It comprised the album version of "D.N.A." plus a radio edit version, and also a live version of "A Woman In Love" and an unreleased bonus track entitled "Can't Push Me Down".

== Reception ==
Into the Blues debuted at Number 1 on the Billboard Blues chart, remaining at that position for 12 consecutive weeks and was nominated at the 50th Annual Grammy Awards for Best Contemporary Blues Album. Armatrading is the first British female artist to debut at number 1 on Billboard's Blues chart and the first British female artist to be nominated for a Grammy Award in the Blues category.

Record Collector magazine called the album "the most complete portrait yet of an often underrated singer-songwriter", noted that "half the album drips with barroom sleaze and blistering guitar breaks" and praised the album's "subtlety".

Gary Graff, writing in Billboard magazine, said: "Armatrading's take is wide and distinctive and stretches the parameters of what we consider the blues".

David Bauder of Associated Press said that Armatrading "has never played better guitar on record".

The Aspen Times drew attention to the album's "yearning, grit and pain" and praised the "smooth and sultry" feel of the songs.

Dave Gil de Rubio, writing in the East Bay Express in California stated that Armatrading "puts a fresh stamp on a classic American genre" and that her guitar playing "rings with a Mark Knopfler-like resonance", praising her "rich and burnished voice".

== Track listing ==
All songs written and arranged by Joan Armatrading.

1. "A Woman in Love" – 3:54
2. "Play the Blues" – 4:32
3. "Into the Blues" – 4:22
4. "Liza" – 4:07
5. "Secular Songs" – 4:11
6. "My Baby's Gone" – 3:35
7. "D.N.A." – 4:02
8. "Baby Blue Eyes" – 3:55
9. "Deep Down" – 3:58
10. "There Ain't a Little Girl Alive" – 4:25
11. "Empty Highway" – 5:25
12. "Mama Papa" – 4:00
13. "Something's Gotta Blow" – 8:02

== Personnel ==
Musicians

- Joan Armatrading – vocals, guitar, mandolin, bass, harp, keyboards, harmonica
- Miles Bould – drums, percussion

Production

- Producer: Joan Armatrading
- Arranger: Joan Armatrading
- Engineer: Graham Dickson
- Co-engineer: Joan Armatrading
- Mixed by: Graham Dickson & Joan Armatrading
- Photography: Andrew Catlin
- Art direction: David Alan Kogut
