= Lovers Speak =

Studio album by Joan Armatrading
- Released: 25 March 2003
- Recorded: G2
- Genre: Pop
- Length: 54:47
- Label: Denon
- Producer: Joan Armatrading

Joan Armatrading chronology
What's Inside (1995)	Lovers Speak (2003)	Live: All the Way from America (2007)

Lovers Speak is the fifteenth studio album by British singer-songwriter Joan Armatrading, and was released on 25 March 2003. Three tracks from the album ("Lovers Speak", "Love Bug" and "Crazy for You") were released by Telstar on 10 March 2003 as a sampler.

== Background ==
Lovers Speak was the first studio album released by Armatrading in eight years, following the 1995 release of What's Inside. At the time of this album's release she was no longer attached to a major record label – she had spent 18 years with A&M and had then released one album through RCA. All the songs on Lovers Speak were written, arranged and produced by Armatrading, and recorded at G2 Music. The album was released on 25 March 2003 by Denon Music (DEN 17185), part of the Savoy Label Group. Armatrading plays all the instruments on the album apart from drums, and brass on two of the tracks. Containing fourteen songs and running at nearly 51 minutes, the album is the longest studio album Armatrading had yet produced.

During the eight years between this and her previous studio album What's Inside, Armatrading had involved herself in a number of other activities. In December 1998 she released a CD entitled Lullabies with a Difference for a children's charity called PACES, which included contributions from Mark Knopfler, Jools Holland, Midge Ure, Tina Turner, The Cranberries, Melissa Etheridge, Brian May and Lewis Taylor; all artists she admired and whom she asked to contribute. In 1999 she wrote, upon request, a tribute song (The Messenger) for Nelson Mandela and performed it for him. She also studied at the Open University, receiving her BA (Hons) degree in History in 2001.

Armatrading dedicated Lovers Speak to her "good friends" Gus Dudgeon and his wife Sheila Bailey, who had both been killed in a car accident in July 2002. Gus Dudgeon had produced her debut album Whatever's for Us in 1972.

In an interview for The Washington Post in July 2003, Armatrading said of the songs on the album that they "are about people's reactions to love and what happens in love, falling in love and how to survive falling in love".

She later said of the song "Blessed" that it was a "song saying 'Thank you very much for the life I have.' I'm very appreciative and I want to acknowledge it, not just quietly to myself. It's not about fame and money, it's just life and how you feel."

== Reception ==
Professional ratings
Review scores
Source	Rating
AllMusic	4.5/5 stars
The Guardian	3/5 stars
Uncut	1.5/5 stars

The album received a number of positive reviews and reached number 42 on Billboard's Top Independent Albums chart.

Martin C. Strong, writing in The Great Rock Discography, referred to Lovers Speak as an "acclaimed" album, and "a late blossoming tour de force of emotional examination", and went on to say that the album "outshone almost everything the singer had done since the 70s."

AllMusic's Thom Jurek described the album as "a startling testament of artistic integrity, searing emotional honesty, musical accessibility and sophistication" and said that it is "unmatched by anything on the current musical scene". He praised the album's "gorgeous pop, folk, and jazz forms" and its "eclectic, musical, and lyrical diversity", concluding that it is "poetry … a masterpiece", that "should be a contender for pop album of 2003". The album received 4.5 from 5 stars on the site. In another review, Jurek described Lovers Speak as "among the most searing meditations on love from all sides we have in the pop music canon".

Lydia Vanderloo of Barnes & Noble called Lovers Speak a "confident, understated album that spotlights the depth of [Armatrading's] voice and verse". She drew attention to Armatrading's "soulful vocals" and the "simple but effective arrangements rich with piano, acoustic guitar, and discreet rhythms" going on to single out the tracks "Ocean," "Less Happy More Often", "Let's Talk About Us", "In These Times", "Physical Pain", "Waiting" and "Love Bug" for special mention.

Rashod D. Ollison of the Chicago Tribune referred to the album as "deeper [and] more spiritual … spiced with quirky romantic tales" that "[recall] classic Armatrading but with more simplicity and clearer messages".

David Thomas of The Daily Telegraph called Lovers Speak: "a classic break-up album, written very directly, emotionally and sensually" and described it as "poignant, gorgeous, melodic".

Dave Simpson of The Guardian referred to the song "In These Times" as "harrowing and moving".

"In These Times" appeared on the compilation album Songs for Tibet: The Art of Peace, which was released in 2008 by The Art of Peace Foundation.

== Tour ==
Armatrading embarked on a tour to promote the album after its release. It was this tour that gave rise to her second live album, Live: All the Way from America, when a concert from the tour was recorded in Saratoga, California in June 2003. The band for the tour featured Armatrading on vocals and all guitars, Gary Foote on reeds, woodwinds and percussion; and Spencer Cozens on keyboards.

== Track listing ==
All songs written and arranged by Joan Armatrading.

1. "Lovers Speak" – 5:59
2. "Physical Pain" – 3:24
3. "In These Times" – 3:16
4. "Waiting" – 2:52
5. "Prove Yourself" – 3:33
6. "Fire and Ice" – 3:26
7. "Love Bug" – 3:20
8. "Let's Talk About Us" – 3:59
9. "Ocean" – 3:33
10. "Tender Trap" – 4:09
11. "Less Happy More Often" – 3:53
12. "Crazy for You" – 4:09
13. "You Make Your Bed" – 3:52
14. "Blessed" – 1:49
15. "Lovers Speak (Radio edit) – 3:33

== Personnel ==
Musicians

- Joan Armatrading – all vocals and all instruments (guitars, mandolin, bass, keyboards and strings) except as noted below:
- Miles Bould – drums & percussion (all tracks)
- Greg Heath – saxophone (track 7)
- Luke Tunney – trumpet (track 7)
- David Lewis – saxophone (track 13)

Production

- Producer: Joan Armatrading
- Engineer: Graham Dickson
- Mixed by: Graham Dickson
- Photography: Joel Anderson
- Art direction: J. J. Stelmach
- Design: Scott Johnson
- Songs published by Universal
