= Red Young =

American musician (born 1948)

- Born: Don Michael Young; May 8, 1948 (age 77); Fort Worth, Texas, United States
- Genres: Rock, jazz, blues, pop, jazz fusion
- Occupations: Musician, songwriter, arranger, record producer, vocalist
- Instruments: Piano, keyboards, Hammond organ, synthesizer
- Years active: 1960s–present
- Website: redyoung.com

Don Michael "Red" Young (born May 8, 1948) is an American keyboard, piano, synthesizer and organ player.

== Beginnings and early success ==
He grew up in Fort Worth, Texas, United States. He began playing piano at the age of three and did his first classical recital at eight years old. He toured with Clyde McCoy (Sugar Blues) in 1967, the Air Force Band 1968–72 and in 1974 joined Lloyd Price for a brief tour returning to Ft Worth where he joined Warren and Bill Ham, Darryl Norris and formed the Ham Brothers Band. The band did much recording at Huey Meaux's Sugar Hill Studio in Houston and he recorded with Freddy Fender, Noel Redding, Kinky Friedman, Joe Barry and many others during that period.

In 1976 he toured with Tompall Glaser, Willie Nelson, Waylon Jennings and Jessi Colter with Wanted! The Outlaws being the first platinum country album.

After the tour, he joined Sonny & Cher and moved to Los Angeles and subsequent tours and recordings with Joan Armatrading, Dolly Parton, Tanya Tucker, Eric Burdon and Linda Ronstadt with the Nelson Riddle Orchestra in addition to many television, movie and live shows throughout the world. He learned writing for orchestra along the way and studying Nelson Riddle and Victor Feldman among others.

In 1985–87 he returned to Ft Worth to form Red and the Red Hots, (originally named by Genny Schorr, Linda Ronstadt’s wardrobe stylist while on tour with Nelson Riddle), a 10-piece swing band as lead vocalist, arranger and musical director, performing more than 400 shows during the three-year period, including a concert with the Ft Worth Symphony. "The Redhots" included female vocalists Cassie Miller, Dina Bennet, Jennifer Griffith and Rebecca Kyler Downs.

In 1988–2002 he returned to Los Angeles for more recording, producing, television and movie dates as a musician, tours with Juice Newton and four albums with Red & the Red Hots including more than a thousand shows with the band. This was in addition to albums with Big Bad Voodoo Daddy, Royal Crown Revue, Joey Altruda, Johnny Reno and many others.

In 2000 he returned to playing the Hammond B3 organ more and with his trio (Brother Red) and others in the jazz field – the Jazz Jury, Plas Johnson, Big Jay McNeely, Johnny Reno and many others. In addition he also did recording in the blues field – Janiva Magness, Kid Ramos, Marcia Ball and Dan Hicks. He did his own recordings in addition to a blues organ trio album (Brother Red) and a jazz album (The Organizer).

In 2002 he moved to Austin, Texas, and concentrated on jazz organ and did albums also with Stephen Bruton, Marcia Ball among others. From 2004–2005 he was involved in a nightclub in Dallas called Django On The Parkway, where he performed with many artists, including George Clinton, Mike Morgan, Janiva Magness, Teresa James.

In 2006 he joined Eric Burdon again as keyboardist and musical director and still tours with Burdon, in addition to his own performances worldwide and with his wife Silvie Rider.

== Solo career ==
After forming Red and the Red Hots which had its beginnings as a part of Linda Ronstadt and Nelson Riddle Orchestra Tour in 1983–84, Young worked the band steadily for 20 years which produced four albums: Red & The Red Hots (1987), Red Hot Jazz (1996), Boogie Man (1998) and Gettin' Around (1999). In addition to recording they were featured in Everybody Loves Raymond and The Donny & Marie Show.

He released two Hammond organ albums; Brother Red (2000) and The Organizer (2003)

He performs throughout the world in many different formats – both piano, organ, on vocals, conducting, producing and arranging. He also works many dates a month throughout Austin and the rest of Texas.

== Eric Burdon ==
After touring with Burdon in 1982, Young went on to do other things. At Burdon's 60th birthday bash in Los Angeles which included many people throughout the music industry and many special guests, Young, as part of the 1982 band played with Terry Wilson (bass), Tony Braunagel (drums) and Snuffy Walden (guitar). After that Young played on Burdon's My Secret Life album (2004) produced by Tony Braunagel, and joined Burdon in 2006 for a worldwide tour, an arrangement that persists to this day. The 2009 touring band consisted of Billy Watts (guitar), Terry Wilson (bass), Georgia Dagaki (Cretan lyra) and Brannen Temple (drums) and Young on Hammond organ and keyboards. Since 2013 the band was Billy Watts (guitar), Terry Wilson (bass), Wally Ingram (percussion), Tony Braunagel (drums) and Young on keyboards.
