= Hearts and Flowers (album) =

Studio album by Joan Armatrading
- Released: 4 June 1990
- Recorded: Bumpkin
- Genre: Pop
- Length: 39:02
- Label: A&M
- Producer: Joan Armatrading

Joan Armatrading chronology
The Shouting Stage (1988)	Hearts and Flowers (1990)	Square the Circle (1992)

Hearts and Flowers is the twelfth studio album by British singer-songwriter Joan Armatrading. The album was written, arranged and produced by Armatrading; recorded at Bumpkin Studios, her own studios in the grounds of her home; mixed at The Grey Room in Los Angeles and mastered at Sterling Sound, New York. Armatrading began writing the album in 1989 and finished it in April 1990. It was released on 4 June 1990 by A&M Records.

== Background ==
For this album, Armatrading kept on several of the personnel from her previous release The Shouting Stage. Veterans Pino Palladino and Jamie Lane, on bass and drums respectively, continued their long association with her and Manu Katché continued to provide drums and high-hat drums. She also invited Graham Dickson once again to do the engineering and kept on Jeremy Pearce to do the artwork for the album's cover. In a slight departure, Armatrading played keyboards on two of the tracks, something she hadn't done since her early albums Whatever's for Us and Back to the Night. The album in general shows a return to some of the themes and musical influences of these first two albums. Armatrading's unofficial biographer Sean Mayes notes that the album has "a strong feeling of musical roots … and echoes of her earlier albums, particularly Back to the Night".

== The songs ==
On the title track "Hearts and Flowers", Armatrading plays all the instruments with no other accompaniment, something she had not done since her second album Back to the Night.

"Can't Let Go" is the second track on this album on which Armatrading plays all the instruments without any other accompaniment.

"More than One Kind of Love" was released as a single and features the keyboards of Don Freeman and the programmed drums of Jamie Lane. It reached number 75 during a two-week stay in the UK Singles Chart, and Armatrading performed the song live on Wogan on 11 May 1990 and again live on TV-am on 16 May 1990.

"Something In the Air Tonight" features a sax solo from jazz saxophonist and composer Andy Sheppard.

"Free" is a gospel-based number with a rock sax solo from Dave Koz. The song was released as the second single from the album but did not chart.

"Good Times" marks a return by Armatrading to the "tough blues roots" she had last displayed on the song "Mean Old Man" from the Whatever's for Us album.

== Reception ==
Professional ratings
Review scores
Source	Rating
New Musical Express	8/10

The album reached number 29 in the UK album charts, number 161 in the US album charts, and number 56 in Australia.

Sean Mayes notes that Hearts and Flowers is "a confident, exuberant album, one of her strongest for years … that is all about love" and is, he says "the nearest she has ever come to a concept album" and is "her most exciting for a long time".

AllMusic reviewer William Ruhlmann gave the opinion that "Hearts and Flowers" is "an incremental development in the artist's work [that] doesn't contain any songs that rank among her best".

In The Virgin Encyclopedia of Popular Music, Colin Larkin said the album "demonstrated that although the quality of Armatrading's output was seldom less than exemplary, it rarely achieved its commercial desserts."

In the book She-Bop: The Definitive History of Women in Rock, Pop, and Soul, writer Lucy O'Brien referred to the album as Armatrading's "most declarative in years" and praised the "sharp perception of her lyrics".

David Quantick, writing in the New Musical Express in June 1990, praised the album for being "emotional, intelligent and full of a hundred vocal tricks" and singled out the tracks "More than One Kind of Love" and "Something In the Air Tonight" for special mention. He also said that "Joan Armatrading's songs are so sensible, you're afraid to drink alcohol in their presence."

== Tour ==
Armatrading embarked on a tour to promote the album, commencing in the UK on 24 June 1990 at the Birmingham Hippodrome. The US leg of the tour commenced on 6 August 1990 at Saratoga, then visited the Beacon Theatre in New York on 14–16 August, the Wiltern Theatre in Los Angeles on 22–23 August and ended at Berkeley, California on 25 August 1990. She had been scheduled to perform in Sydney, Australia on 29 August and Melbourne on 31 August, but cancelled the concerts on medical advice.

== Track listing ==
All songs written and arranged by Joan Armatrading.

Side 1

1. "More than One Kind of Love" – 5:32
2. "Hearts and Flowers" – 3:40
3. "Promise Land" – 4:00
4. "Someone's in the Background" – 3:55
5. "Can't Let Go" – 4:36

Side 2

1. "Free" – 3:20
2. "Something in the Air Tonight" – 4:32
3. "Always" – 1:56
4. "Good Times" – 4:23
5. "The Power of Dreams" – 3:08

== Personnel ==
Musicians

- Joan Armatrading – vocals, guitars, keyboards
- Don Freeman – keyboards (tracks A1, A3, A4, B1, B2, B3, B4, B5) bass (track B4)
- Mick Karn – bass (tracks A1, A3, A4, B1)
- Steve Jansen – drums (tracks A1, A3, A4, B1)
- Pino Palladino – bass (tracks B2, B5)
- Dave Koz – saxophone (track B1)
- Andy Sheppard – saxophone (track B2)
- Steve Jansen – drums (tracks A3, A4, B1)
- Jamie Lane – drums (tracks A1, B4)
- Manu Katché – drums (tracks B2, B4)
- Hossam Ramzy – percussion

Production

- Producer: Joan Armatrading
- Engineer: Graham Dickson
- Mixed by Tom Lord-Alge
- Mixing Assistant: Micajah Ryan
- Mastered by: Ted Jensen
- Art direction: Jeremy Pearce & Stylorouge
- Design: Stylorouge
- Photography: Richard Haughton
- Distribution: Polydor/PolyGram
- Songs published by Rondor Music Ltd, London
