= The Key (Joan Armatrading album) =

Studio album by Joan Armatrading
- Released: 4 March 1983
- Studios: Townhouse, London, Polar, Stockholm and New York
- Genres: Pop, rock
- Length: 38:38
- Label: A&M
- Producers: Steve Lillywhite, Val Garay

Joan Armatrading chronology
| Walk Under Ladders (1981) | The Key (1983) | Track Record (1983) |

The Key is the eighth studio album by the British singer-songwriter Joan Armatrading, released on 4 March 1983 by A&M Records (AMLX64912). The album was recorded at Townhouse Studios in Shepherd's Bush, London; Polar Studios in Stockholm and also in New York.

The album spawned the single "Drop the Pilot", which became one of Armatrading's biggest hits, reaching number 11 in the UK Singles Chart over a 10-week stay. It also quickly became a staple of Armatrading's live performances and has featured on many of her compilation albums. Armatrading and her backing band also performed the song on Top of the Pops in early 1983.

== Background and recording ==
Steve Lillywhite was commissioned to produce the album; however, A&M Records judged the album to be not commercial enough and asked Armatrading to come up with some additional, more commercial, material. She went away and wrote the tracks "Drop the Pilot" and "What Do Boys Dream", both of which were produced separately in New York by Val Garay. These two tracks therefore used a completely different set of musicians, which explains the length of the personnel list on this album. Armatrading described her process of song creation, from writing to final recording, at the time of The Key:

It takes me very little time to write the song. Ten, fifteen minutes at the most. But to arrange the song, I need to take all day. The song is written with whatever rhythm I've come up with, and I put the arrangement on top of that. I can keep it a little more to what I think it should be than if I allowed somebody else to do it. I sit at home with my little Portastudio, and I work up the bass part, record it; work up the guitar part, record that; the string part, whatever. Put it all down. I play the tape to the musicians so they hear what's happening, and we do it like that. Steve [Lillywhite] obviously has his sound, which is why I work with him: I like his drum sound, his guitar sound, all that stuff.

Armatrading draws on a variety of musical styles for this album, from Stax style brass, rhythm and blues and punk, as well as the rock guitar of Adrian Belew, who had played with David Bowie on Lodger.

The album's title refers to the door key which Armatrading habitually wore around her neck at that time and which is featured in the album's photography. She is also pictured playing a Gibson Les Paul electric guitar.

"(I Love It When You) Call Me Names" was written about two men in a band who were always arguing, and features a guitar solo by Adrian Belew. It was released as a single, though it did not chart. It subsequently became a staple of Armatrading's live performances and has appeared on many of her compilation albums. Armatrading said of the song, "It's come out as a man and a woman, but I was really looking at two guys. Not two gay guys, just two guys who are friends who tend to treat each other like this, always calling each other names. There's sort of this love/hate relationship between them, but you get the feeling that they really enjoy this thing that they're going through."

== Reception ==
Professional ratings
Review scores
| Source | Rating |
|---|---|
| AllMusic | 2.5/5 stars |
| Christgau's Record Guide | B |
| The Encyclopedia of Popular Music | 3/5 stars |

The album was a commercial success for Armatrading, reaching number 10 in the UK album charts and number 32 in the US album charts, as well as spawning the hit single "Drop the Pilot". It was certified Gold by the BPI. The album is one of only two Armatrading albums to reach the top 40 in the USA, the other being Me Myself I. The album peaked at number 4 in Australia and was that country's 7th biggest-selling album of the year.

Debra Rae Cohen, writing in The New York Times, said that the album's songs "dwell on the underlying truths and unadmitted paradoxes of love, of independence, and the area where they overlap and struggle", that Armatrading "shows a new control in her arrangements", the album being "one more step in Miss Armatrading's continual journey" and that The Key should help her to "become a household name". Rolling Stone's Don Shewey, however, disapproved of the album's commercial approach, commenting that, "For more than ten years, Armatrading has remained a commercially marginal cult figure, and on The Key, she seems to have decided to part with the one thing standing between her and success: her originality. The album has several pleasantly energetic tunes that anybody could have written. And both her dramatic monologues and her love songs traffic in the kind of musical and lyrical clichés she previously has always avoided or transcended." He singled out "Call Me Names" and "The Key" as the only two standout tracks on the album, and gave it two and a half out of five stars.

Martin C. Strong noted in The Great Rock Discography that the album was "well received" and represented one of Armatrading's "sole sojourns into the American Top 40". Gillian G. Gaar, writing in She's A Rebel, described "(I Love It When You) Call Me Names" as "a cheeky song" and cited it, and the album generally, as an example of the "more commercial sound that resulted in greater album sales in America".

The album was nominated for both the Grammy Awards for Best Rock Vocal Performance, Female and Best Album Package at the 1984 Grammy Awards.

== Track listing ==
All tracks written and arranged by Joan Armatrading.

Side 1

1. "(I Love It When You) Call Me Names" 4:23
2. "Foolish Pride" 3:16
3. "Drop the Pilot" 3:41
4. "The Key" 4:01
5. "Everybody Gotta Know" 3:48

Side 2

1. "Tell Tale" 2:31
2. "What Do Boys Dream" 2:55
3. "The Game of Love" 3:34
4. "The Dealer" 3:19
5. "Bad Habits" 3:43
6. "I Love My Baby" 3:29

== Personnel ==
Musicians

- Joan Armatrading – vocals, acoustic guitar, electric guitar, piano
- Adrian Belew – electric guitar
- Daryl Stuermer – electric guitar
- Gary Sanford – electric guitar
- Tony Levin – bass guitar
- Larry Fast – synthesisers
- Jerry Marotta – drums
- Stewart Copeland – drums
- Julian Diggle – percussion
- Mel Collins – saxophone
- Annie Whitehead – trombone
- Guy Barker – trumpet
- Dean Klevatt – piano
- Jeremy Meek – bass vocal

Musicians on "Drop the Pilot" & "What Do Boys Dream"

- Joan Armatrading – vocals
- Craig Hull – electric guitar
- Tim Pierce – electric guitar
- Bryan Garofalo – bass guitar
- Steve "Goldie" Goldstein – keyboards
- Craig Krampf – drums
- M. L. Benoit – percussion
- Val Garay – production

Production

- Producer: Steve Lillywhite
- Engineer: Mark Dearnley
- New York producer & engineer: Val Garay
- New York producer's assistant: Niko Bolas
- Cover painting: Donna Muir
- Photography: Jamie Morgan
- Design & art direction: Michael Ross

== Charts ==
=== Weekly charts ===
| Chart (1983–84) | Peak position |
|---|---|
| Australian Albums (Kent Music Report) | 4 |
| Canada Top Albums/CDs (RPM) | 69 |
| Dutch Albums (Album Top 100) | 17 |
| German Albums (Offizielle Top 100) | 24 |
| New Zealand Albums (RMNZ) | 3 |
| Norwegian Albums (VG-lista) | 4 |
| Swedish Albums (Sverigetopplistan) | 14 |
| UK Albums (Official Charts) | 10 |
| US Billboard 200 | 32 |

=== Year-end charts ===
| Chart (1983) | Position |
|---|---|
| Australian Albums (Kent Music Report) | 7 |
| New Zealand Albums (RMNZ) | 20 |

== Certifications ==
| Region | Certification | Certified units/sales |
|---|---|---|
| United Kingdom (BPI) | Gold | 100,000^{^} |
^{^} Shipments figures based on certification alone.
