= Willow (Joan Armatrading song) =

1977 single by Joan Armatrading

Single by Joan Armatrading

from the album Show Some Emotion
- B-side: "No Way Out"
- Released: 7 October 1977
- Length: 4:55 (album version); 3:58 (single edit)
- Label: A&M
- Songwriter: Joan Armatrading
- Producer: Glyn Johns

Joan Armatrading singles chronology
"Down to Zero" (1977)	"Willow" (1977)	"Show Some Emotion" (1978)

Audio
- "Willow" on YouTube

"Willow" is a song by the English singer-songwriter Joan Armatrading, released on 7 October 1977 by A&M Records as the lead single from her fourth album, Show Some Emotion (1977). The song was written by Armatrading and produced by Glyn Johns. Although it did not enter the UK singles chart, "Willow" is one of Armatrading's best known songs.

== Background ==
Armatrading wrote "Willow" while she was staying in West Palm Beach, Florida. She was due to perform in a bar but, after finding it was a "horrible place", she left and returned to her hotel room. In LaShonda K. Barnett's 2007 book I Got Thunder: Black Women Songwriters and Their Craft, Armatrading recalled, "At that point, I was somewhere in my life, both literally and metaphorically – geographically and emotionally – that I didn't particularly want to be. I was in my hotel room one afternoon and outside my window there was this willow tree. At the time it seemed to be the one constant thing in my life, the willow tree. So, it's sort of a love song for the tree."

== Release ==
"Willow" was released by A&M Records in the UK only on 7 October 1977. The B-side, "No Way Out", was a non-album track recorded during the Show Some Emotion sessions.

"Willow" did not make an appearance in the Top 50 of the UK singles chart, but it did gain airplay on BBC Radio 1, Radio Luxembourg and across Independent Local Radio. BBC Radio 1's Simon Bates picked it as his "record of the week". It was listed in Music Week magazine's "top add ons" for airplay action in the week ending 22 October 1977. Despite its limited commercial success as a single, "Willow" has since become one of Armatrading's best known songs.

== Critical reception ==
Upon its release as a single, John Fitzpatrick of the Cumbernauld News & Kilsyth Chronicle picked "Willow" as the newspaper's "record of the week" and commented, "This must be one of the ballads of the year. It is sung with so much feeling and style by Joan. She is one of the best singers to emerge this decade and I'm sure that 'Willow' will be a very big hit for her indeed." Colin Gay of The Bolton News called it "Joan at her best, really getting into the whole of the number and putting it over well". Tony Wilson of the Evening Herald described it as a "moody performance" and "something on the lines of 'Love and Affection', with its relaxed, understated approach". He added, "Quality single with a fine song by a fine singer. Must be a hit."

Philip Hall of Record Mirror wrote, "I can never make my mind up about Miss Armatrading. Is she an overrated romantic or a sensitive artiste? 'Willow' confirms the latter - it's relaxingly delicate but all too easily forgettable. Still, constant radio play could change all that and provide us with a genuine love song in the charts." Pauline McLeod of the Daily Mirror described it as "not an obviously commercial single". Ian Birch of Melody Maker called it "more surface sheen than actual substance". He noted the "graceful atmosphere" provided in the production by Glyn Johns, but added "however strenuous his efforts are, they don't give the helium-light song any sense of direction".

In 2020, music critic Neil McCormick, writing for The Telegraph, included "Willow" in his list of "pop and rock's 100 best British songs". He praised the "tender" song as a "masterpiece of metaphor and melody". Shakespeare director Michael Pennington wrote about how Armatrading changed the symbolism of the willow from its historic representation of romantic mourning to a "source of comfort and protection."

== Live performances ==
"Willow" has been a regular inclusion in the setlist of Armatrading's live concerts over the years and is usually performed as the final number before the encore. She has commented that her audiences "seem to absolutely love [the] song" and will often sing in unison with her. Performances of the song have been included on Armatrading's 2004 live album Live: All the Way from America and her 2011 live album Live at the Royal Albert Hall.

== Track listing ==
7–inch single (UK)

1. "Willow" (edit) – 3:58
2. "No Way Out" – 2:11

== Personnel ==
"Willow"

- Joan Armatrading – vocals, acoustic guitar
- Jerry Donahue – electric guitar
- Georgie Fame – Rhodes piano
- Bryan Garofalo – bass
- David Kemper – drums
- Brian Rogers – string arrangement, string conductor

Production

- Glyn Johns – production, engineering
- John Astley – engineering assistance
