= Me Myself I (song) =

1980 single by Joan Armatading

Single by Joan Armatrading

from the album Me Myself I
- B-side: "When You Kisses Me"
- Released: 6 June 1980
- Genre: Pop rock
- Length: 3:16
- Label: A&M
- Songwriter: Joan Armatrading
- Producer: Richard Gottehrer

Joan Armatrading singles chronology
"He Wants Her" (1980)	"Me Myself I" (1980)	"All the Way from America" (1980)

Official audio
- "Me Myself I" on YouTube

"Me Myself I" is a song by British singer-songwriter Joan Armatrading, released in June 1980 as the first single from her album of the same name. The song features jazz musician Marcus Miller on bass. It peaked at number 21 on the UK Singles Chart.

== Meaning ==
Armatrading has said, "I'm very comfortable being on my own, I have no problems with it. I think quite a lot of people have a problem with being on their own, and I think it's quite a healthy thing to enjoy being by yourself. That's really what I was saying. Sometimes being on your own is quite an empowering thing".

== Critical reception ==
Upon its release, Deanne Pearson of Smash Hits described "Me Myself I" as having "genuine power and emotion" and believed it was Armatrading's "best single" since 1976's "Love and Affection". She wrote, "The song has a natural running melody that is sometimes absent from her more folky material and the intensity of the lyrics and arrangements are softened to just the right degree, producing a pop song that contains thought, feeling and conviction." Robin Smith of Record Mirror noted the song's commercial potential, writing, "Big on ego, big on lyrics and huge on production, this should see Armatrading neatly cleaning up. Her most stark offering so far, attacking her previous, rather softer, style with a bottle of paint stripper. What a voice, what a song. Buy it."

== Track listing ==
7"

1. "Me Myself I" – 3:16
2. "When You Kisses Me" – 3:14

== Charts ==
Chart (1980)	Peak position
Australia (Kent Music Report)	24
Ireland (IRMA)	13
Netherlands (Single Top 100)	38
New Zealand (Recorded Music NZ)	14
South Africa (Springbok Radio)	13
UK Singles (OCC)	21
UK Airplay Guide 100 (Record Business)	11
