= Joan Armatrading (album) =

Studio album by Joan Armatrading
- Released: July 1976
- Recorded: 1976
- Studio: Olympic (London)
- Genres: Folk rock; pop
- Length: 41:32
- Label: A&M
- Producer: Glyn Johns

Joan Armatrading chronology
Back to the Night (1975)	Joan Armatrading (1976)	Show Some Emotion (1977)

Singles from Joan Armatrading
- 1. "Love and Affection" Released: 27 August, 1976; 2. "Down to Zero" Released: 28 January, 1977; 3. "Water with the Wine" Released: March 1977

Joan Armatrading is the third studio album by British singer-songwriter Joan Armatrading, released in 1976 by A&M Records. It was her first album to be recorded entirely in London; her first two albums, Whatever's for Us and Back to the Night, were partially recorded in France and Wales, respectively, in addition to London. Released in 1976, the album peaked at number 12 on the UK Albums Chart and was certified Gold by the British Phonographic Industry. It includes Armatrading's best-selling single, "Love and Affection".

Armatrading's 1979 live album Steppin' Out contained two songs from this album, "Love and Affection" and "Tall in the Saddle". She is pictured on the cover of the album playing an Ovation Guitar.

The album's producer, Glyn Johns, later said it was the best album he had ever been associated with. With reference to Armatrading's first two albums he worked on, Johns writes "I have very fond memories of these first two albums that I made with Joan. They are up there with my favorites from all the records I have made".

== Reception ==
Professional ratings
Review scores
Source	Rating
AllMusic	4.5/5 stars
Christgau's Record Guide	B
The Encyclopedia of Popular Music	4/5 stars
Pitchfork	9.1/10
The Rolling Stone Album Guide	4/5 stars
Sounds	5/5 stars

Reviewing for Sounds, Phil Sutcliffe gave the album 5 out of 5, describing it as a "continuation of Back to the Night, [...] maintaining the musical standards of lightness, flexibility and clarity and in several songs stepping into a new dimension of expressiveness with her lyrics." "Unrecognised as she is we need Joan Armatrading like we need Bob Dylan and the Beatles. You'll play this record once in a while forever."

David Hepworth for New Musical Express wrote that Armatrading "no longer has to prove anything to anybody for she defines her own terms; the poetry of this album is not the flat print of the lyric sheet but lies rather in the animate pulse of pure music where voice, words, tune and instruments are utterly inseparable." and that she "has quite possibly come up with the richest work of this renaissance [of putting the heart back into music] so far, and if there's another album as good as this in the remainder of the year we'll be very lucky indeed. Invest. Immediately."

Reviewing for Melody Maker, Richard Williams wrote that her "writing, singing, and playing evince a sure-footedness which borders on arrogance" and "much of this must be due to the influence of her new producer, Glyn Johns, whose finest hour this is. Teaming her with musicians of spirit and taste, he uses textural effects (strings, added guitars, voices) with economy yet with unerring rightness: each added component strengthens the song without overcrowding the singer or the song."

When reviewed in Billboard, the album was described as "thoroughly diverse and immensely enjoyable", delivering "the kind of lyrically touching and introspective ballads that have characterized Janis Ian's work."

Writing at the time in The Guardian, Robin Denselow wrote that the album "showed that we now have a black artist in Britain with the same sort of vocal range, originality (in fact even greater originality in terms of musical influences) and lyrical sensitivity" as Joni Mitchell.

In a retrospective review for AllMusic, Dave Connolly calls it Armatrading's "most muscular music to date" and particularly praises "Down to Zero" and "Love and Affection". He also commends Glyn Johns' production. He says that the album "almost single-handedly [elevated Armatrading] into the ranks of rock's leading female artists."

The album was included in Robert Dimery's edited book 1001 Albums You Must Hear Before You Die.

== Track listing ==
All tracks are written by Joan Armatrading.

Side one
No.	Title	Length
1.	"Down to Zero"	3:51
2.	"Help Yourself"	4:04
3.	"Water with the Wine"	2:48
4.	"Love and Affection"	4:28
5.	"Save Me"	3:35

Side two
No.	Title	Length
1.	"Join the Boys"	4:48
2.	"People"	3:30
3.	"Somebody Who Loves You"	3:33
4.	"Like Fire"	5:12
5.	"Tall in the Saddle"	5:43

== Personnel ==
Musicians

- Joan Armatrading – vocals, 6 & 12-string acoustic guitars
- Jerry Donahue – acoustic & electric guitars
- Bryn Haworth – slide guitar on "Like Fire", mandolin on "Somebody Who Loves You"
- Jimmy Jewell – alto saxophone on "Love and Affection"
- Dave Markee – bass guitar
- B. J. Cole – steel guitar on "Down to Zero"
- Graham Lyle – 12-string guitar on "Down to Zero"
- Dave Mattacks – drums
- Brian Rogers – string arrangement on "Help Yourself"
- Peter Wood – Hammond organ, piano, electric piano
- Kenney Jones – drums
- Leroy Champaign – backing vocals on "Love and Affection" and "People"
- Clarke Peters – backing vocals on "Love and Affection" and "People"

Technical

- Fabio Nicoli – art direction
- Nick Marshall – design
- Clive Arrowsmith – photography

== Charts ==
=== Weekly charts ===
Chart (1976–1977)	Peak position
Australian Albums (Kent Music Report)	52
Canada Top Albums/CDs (RPM)	76
New Zealand Albums (RMNZ)	11
UK Albums (Official Charts)	12
US Billboard 200	67

=== Year-end charts ===
Chart (1977)	Position
New Zealand Albums (RMNZ)	39

== Certifications ==
Region	Certification	Certified units/sales
New Zealand (RMNZ)	Platinum	15,000^{^}
United Kingdom (BPI)	Gold	100,000^{^}
^{^} Shipments figures based on certification alone.

== Bibliography ==
- Futrell, Jon; Gill, Chris; St. Pierre, Roger; Richardson, Clive; Fisher, Bob; Sheehy, Bill and Wesker, Lindsay (1982) The Illustrated Encyclopedia of Black Music. Salamander Books, London. ISBN 0-86101-145-7
