= Joan Armatrading =

English musician (born 1950)

Joan Armatrading CBE
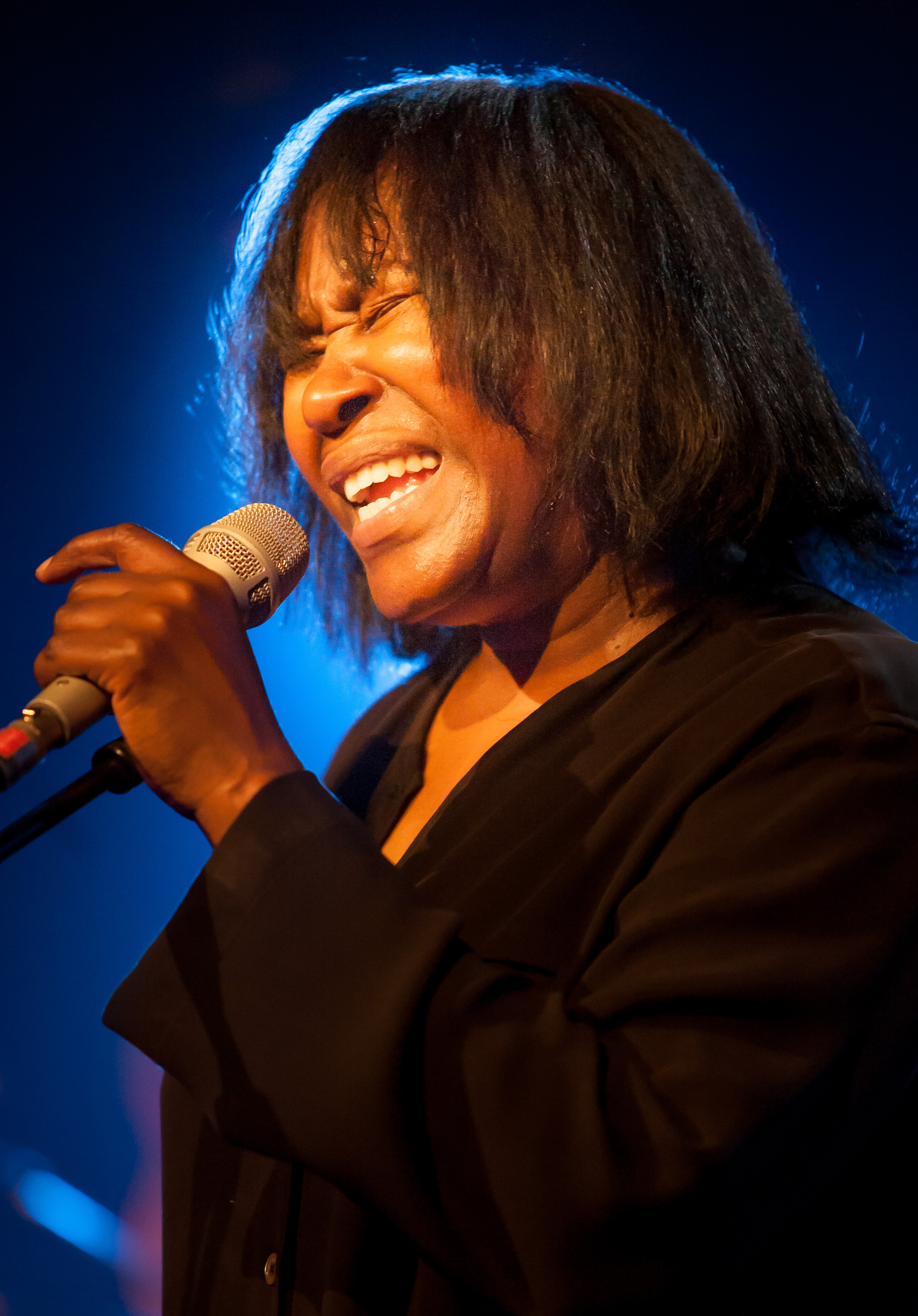
- Armatrading performing in Germany, 2007
- Born: Joan Anita Barbara Armatrading; 9 December 1950 (age 75); Basseterre, British Leeward Islands (now Saint Kitts and Nevis)
- Occupation: Singer-songwriter
- Years active: 1972–present
- Musical career
- Genres: Rock; pop; folk rock; blues
- Instruments: Vocals; guitar; keyboards; bass guitar
- Labels: Curb; A&M; RCA; Universal; EMI; Savoy Jazz; BMG
- Website: joanarmatrading.com

Joan Anita Barbara Armatrading (/ˈɑːrməˌtreɪdɪŋ/, born 9 December 1950) is an English singer-songwriter and guitarist. Her first major commercial success came with her third and fourth albums, Joan Armatrading (1976) and Show Some Emotion (1977), and she continues to play live and record studio albums. A three-time Grammy Award nominee, Armatrading has also been nominated twice for BRIT Awards as Best Female Artist. She received an Ivor Novello Award for Outstanding Contemporary Song Collection in 1996.

== Early life and education ==
Joan Anita Barbara Armatrading, the third of six children, was born on 9 December 1950 in the town of Basseterre in what was then the British colony of Saint Christopher and Nevis. Her father was a carpenter and her mother a housewife. When she was three years old, her parents moved with their two eldest boys to Birmingham in England, sending Armatrading to live with her grandmother on the West Indian island of Antigua.

In early 1958, age seven, she joined her parents in Brookfields, then a district of Birmingham. Her father had played in a band in his youth, later forbidding his children from touching his guitar. At about the age of 14 Armatrading began writing songs by setting her own limericks to music on a piano that her mother had purchased as "a piece of furniture". Armatrading then began teaching herself guitar after her mother had bought her one that was worth £3 (equivalent to £51 in 2025) from a pawn shop in exchange for two prams.

Armatrading left school at the age of 15 to help support her family. She lost her first job (as a typist and comptometer operator) after taking her guitar to work and playing it during tea-breaks.

== Career ==
=== Late 1960s and 1970s ===
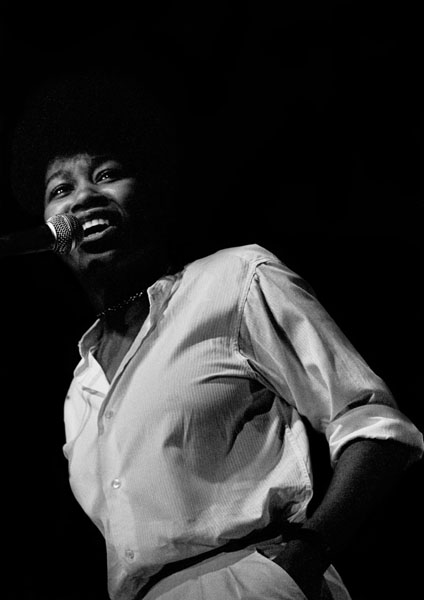
Armatrading in concert at the National Stadium, Dublin, early 1980s

Armatrading first performed in a concert at the University of Birmingham for her brother at the age of about 16. She knew only her own songs, but her brother asked her to perform something that would be familiar to the audience; she chose "The Sound of Silence". She then performed her own songs around the local area with a friend from school, and played bass- and rhythm-guitar at local clubs. In 1968 Armatrading joined a touring production of the stage musical Hair. There she met the lyricist Pam Nestor in 1970, and they worked together on Armatrading's debut album Whatever's for Us, released by Cube Records in 1972. Nestor wrote the lyrics to eleven of the 14 songs on the album, while Armatrading wrote the lyrics to three of them, performed all the vocals, wrote all the music and played an array of instruments on the album. Although Nestor was credited as co-lyricist, Cube regarded Armatrading as the more likely star material. These events produced a tension that broke up the partnership.

On 31 October 1972, Armatrading appeared on the BBC Radio 1 John Peel Show performing "Head of the Table", "Spend A Little Time", "Child Star" and "Whatever's For Us". She sang and played acoustic guitar and piano. In 1973, Cube released on the Fly label (catalogue: Bug 31) Armatrading's first single, "Lonely Lady" (with lyrics by Nestor), a song that had not been included on the album. It proved unsuccessful in the charts, and a period of inactivity for Armatrading followed while she extricated herself from her contract with Cube. The single was subsequently withdrawn by Cube and re-released as a promotional single in the US by Armatrading's new label A&M Records, the same year (as A&M1452). In January 1974, she appeared again on the John Peel Show. Performing "Some Sort of Love Song", "Lonely Lady" and "Freedom", she again sang and played acoustic guitar and piano, but was accompanied by supporting musicians Snowy White (guitar), Mike Tomich (bass) and Brian Glassock (drums).

In 1975, Armatrading was free to sign with A&M Records, and issued the album Back to the Night, which she promoted on tour with six-piece, English jazz-pop group The Movies. Armatrading credited English singer Elkie Brooks on the sleeve notes as she had cooked for Armatrading and the band in the studio while they had been making the album, which was produced by Brooks' then husband Pete Gage. A major publicity relaunch in 1976 and the involvement of producer Glyn Johns propelled her next album, Joan Armatrading, into the Top 20 and spawned the Top-10 hit single "Love and Affection". The album mixed acoustic work with jazz-influenced material, and this style was retained for the 1977 follow-up Show Some Emotion, also produced by Glyn Johns, as was 1978's To the Limit. These albums included songs which became staples of Armatrading's live shows, including "Willow", "Down to Zero", "Tall in the Saddle", and "Kissin' and a Huggin'". Also at this time Armatrading wrote and performed "Flight of the Wild Geese", which was used during the opening- and end-titles of the 1978 war film The Wild Geese. The song was included on the soundtrack album for the film, originally released by A&M Records, later released under licence as a Cinephile DVD. A live album entitled Steppin' Out was released in 1979.

Between 1972 and 1976, Armatrading made a total of eight appearances in session for the John Peel show, and the decade saw her become the first Black British female singer-songwriter to enjoy international success. On 14 May 1977, Armatrading appeared as the musical guest on NBC's Saturday Night Live. She performed "Love and Affection" and "Down to Zero".

=== 1980s and 1990s ===
In 1980, Armatrading revised her playing style and released Me Myself I, a harder rock- and pop-oriented album produced by Richard Gottehrer, who had previously produced albums for Blondie. The album became Armatrading's highest ever charting album both in the UK and the US, while the title track became her second UK Top 40 hit single. In that year, she performed on Rockpalast night. The same pop style as on her previous album, now coupled with synthesisers, was also evident on the 1981 album Walk Under Ladders and 1983's The Key. All three of these albums were Top 10 successes in the UK, with The Key also producing the hit single "Drop the Pilot", Armatrading's third UK Top 40 hit single (UK #11). To capitalise on her success, A&M released the best of compilation album, Track Record, in 1983.

Armatrading performed in 1985 at a sold-out concert at the Red Rocks Amphitheater in Morrison, Colorado and another concert in Arizona with Cook da Books. That year she released her next album, Secret Secrets. The album was a top 20 hit but failed to yield any hit singles, cementing Armatrading's status as an "album artist". Taking over production responsibilities herself, she recorded the albums Sleight of Hand (1986), The Shouting Stage (1988) and Hearts and Flowers (1990) for A&M Records, which all made the UK Top 40 but failed to achieve the level of commercial success of her earlier works despite successful national tours (a show from her 1988 "Shouting Stage" tour was also filmed for television). In 1991, A&M released the compilation The Very Best of Joan Armatrading which returned her to the Top 10. However, her following studio album for A&M, 1992's Square the Circle, did not replicate this success and would be her final recording for the label. Following her departure from A&M, a label she had been with for almost 20 years, Armatrading signed with RCA for her 1995 album What's Inside. Despite various television appearances and a full tour (which included a string quartet in addition to her stage band), the album was not a commercial success, becoming her lowest charting studio album in 20 years. In August 1996 Armatrading performed at the Edmonton Folk Music Festival. In December 1998, she released Lullabies with a Difference, an album of lullabies contributed by her and several of her favourite artists, in honour of PACES, a charity for children with cerebral palsy.

=== 2000–2009 ===
In 2003, no longer attached to a major label, she released the album Lovers Speak. Though it was her first album in eight years, it met with little commercial success. In 2004, she released a live album, Live: All the Way from America, which was a recording of a concert from her Lovers Speak tour.

Her 2007 album Into the Blues debuted at No. 1 on the US Billboard Blues Chart, making Armatrading the first UK female artist to earn that distinction. Into the Blues, which Armatrading called "the CD I've been promising myself to write for a long time", was nominated for a Grammy Award, also making her the first female UK artist to be nominated in the Grammy Blues category.

In 2007, Armatrading appeared in Episode 3 of the second series of Live from Abbey Road performing "Tall in the Saddle" from her 1976 self-titled album, and "Woman in Love" from the album Into The Blues. She also appeared on Later... with Jools Holland.

In 2008, she was part of Cyndi Lauper's True Colors Tour 2008.

=== 2010–2020 ===
On 29 March 2010, she released the album This Charming Life. The album peaked at No. 4 on the US Billboard Folk Albums chart. She embarked on an international tour to promote it, and a concert from this tour in April 2010 at the Royal Albert Hall in London was released on the CD/DVD album Live at the Royal Albert Hall, along with two tracks from a concert in Denver, Colorado, US, in February 2011. In 2012, she released the album Starlight.

For her 2012 Starlight tour she invited 56 singer–songwriters/artists to open for her in their respective home towns before her main tour support Chris Wood. Each of the artists opening for her across the UK also had a track selected for a three disc compilation released by her record label Hypertension Music. She presented Armatrading's Singer-Songwriters, a two-part radio series showcasing these artists, which was broadcast on BBC Radio 2 in February 2013.

Between 2014 and 2015, Armatrading embarked on her last major tour, the Me Myself I Tour, the first to feature her solo on stage. An accompanying CD/DVD album, entitled Me Myself I World Tour, was released in 2016.

In 2016, Armatrading was commissioned by director Phyllida Lloyd and the Donmar Warehouse to write the music to an all-female production of William Shakespeare's The Tempest. Armatrading released an accompanying digital album, The Tempest Songs.

In 2018, she signed to BMG. Her first album for the label, Not Too Far Away, was released in May 2018.

=== 2021–present ===
In May 2021, she announced that her new album Consequences would be released later that year and shared a sample track, "Already There"; the album was released in June of that year. In 2022, she released a live album, Live at Asylum Chapel, and a book of selected lyrics, The Weakness in Me, to celebrate the 50th anniversary of her performing career.

In 2022, she composed her first classical work, Symphony No. 1; it was premiered by the Chineke! Orchestra at Southbank Centre in London on 24 November 2023. It is to be recorded for Decca Records. In October 2024, she announced a new album, How Did This Happen and What Does It Now Mean; it was released on 22 November. The music video for its first single, "I'm Not Moving", was released on 2 October 2024.

=== Appearances and other media ===
In addition to recording, Armatrading has toured extensively and appeared in high-profile concerts such as "The Picnic at Blackbushe" in 1978 (alongside Bob Dylan and Eric Clapton) and The Prince's Trust Rock Gala in 1983. She also appeared in the film The Secret Policeman's Third Ball in 1987. She has also made many appearances on television, including The Old Grey Whistle Test for the BBC in 1975; "Joan Armatrading: Rock over Europe" in 1980; "Joan Armatrading in Concert" in 1982; "Late Night in Concert" in 1984; "Joan Armatrading" in 1985; and "In Concert" in 1988.

In 1989, she was the guest of Sue Lawley on the BBC Radio 4 radio programme Desert Island Discs where her favourite choice was Van Morrison's "Madame George". Armatrading's full list included Ella Fitzgerald and Gustav Mahler. (Note: Armatrading's full list on Desert Island Discs was: Violin Concerto in E Minor by Felix Mendelssohn; "That Old Black Magic" by Ella Fitzgerald; "Madame George" by Van Morrison; Symphony No. 4 in G major by Gustav Mahler; The Magnificent Seven theme by the Cincinnati Pops Orchestra; "Dies irae" (from Requiem Mass) by Giuseppe Verdi; "I'm a Man" by Muddy Waters; Symphony No. 9 in E minor ("From The New World") by Antonín Dvořák) Her luxury item was a guitar, while her castaway's book was Why Didn't They Ask Evans? by Agatha Christie.

Armatrading presented a five-part series on BBC Radio 4 called Joan Armatrading's Favourite Guitarists which was broadcast in July 2009, in which she talked to guitarists about their music and their technique. She followed this up with another five-part series called Joan Armatrading: More Guitar Favourites, which was broadcast in November and December 2011. In 2012, she was interviewed on BBC Radio Scotland about her life and song-writing inspirations by Tom Morton for the Musical Legends series.

On 19 May 2015, Armatrading appeared on BBC Two's Later... with Jools Holland, singing "Me Myself I". On 11 May 2018, she was a guest on BBC One's The Graham Norton Show and performed her new single "I like it when we're together".

In September 2019, Armatrading was the subject of the one-hour documentary Me Myself I, aired on BBC Four, in which she tells her life story, both as a songwriter and as a performer, with key performances from many of the musicians she has influenced.

Armatrading is a self-confessed fan of comics and actually appeared as herself in a 1983 edition of The Beano, in the "Tom, Dick and Sally" comic strip.

== Style ==
She's a little long-winded, but that's mostly because she puts so much thought into her relationships, which in turn is because she puts so much feeling into them; this is one of those rare pop stars who's invariably serious but never pompous, which is why she isn't a bigger star.

— Christgau's Record Guide: The '80s (1990)

Armatrading possesses the vocal range of a contralto. Her music draws on a wide range of influences including rock, folk, jazz, blues, soul, and reggae.

Her songs have been described as "some of the most deeply personal and emotionally naked ... of our times". In a 2003 interview, she said: "My songs aren't about me at all. They're always about love, the pain and anguish of it. But the way I've always written is from observation. They're about what I see other people going through. If the songs were about me I'd be so embarrassed I don't think I'd be able to walk out the front door." She went on to say: "the optimistic songs reveal a bit more of me because that's how I feel. I'm definitely a 'glass is half full' kind of a person." Many of her lyrics do not specify the gender of their subjects and she frequently uses the word "you" rather than a gender pronoun.

== Guitars ==
Armatrading performs on both six- and twelve-string acoustic and electric guitars. She has played on Ovation acoustic instruments since 1973, and said this about them in an interview with the magazine Guitar Player: "I'm a bit of a hitter, you see – I bash – and I like to have everything going at once: bass, harmony, and melody. This is why I love Ovations. They are very powerful-sounding guitars, and when I hit those strings, they ring with a nice, clear, percussive – but not overly bright – sound that highlights the rhythms I like to play." She has played Fender Stratocaster and Gibson electric guitars. For her 2012–13 tour, she performed on six- and 12-string Ovations, Stratocasters, and customised Tom Anderson guitars, while for her 2014–2015 Me Myself I Tour, she performed on Ovation and Variax instruments.

== Personal life ==
Armatrading is reluctant to discuss her personal life in interviews. In a 2003 interview with David Thomas of The Daily Telegraph, she said:

People who like my music have a legitimate interest in me, but I need to retain some privacy, not to be telling people what's going on, or what I feel. When you go home, the reason it's beautiful is because it's personal to you and the people you want to include in it.

In addition to her music career, in 2001, after five years of studying, Armatrading earned a BA degree in history from the Open University, of which she is now a trustee. Between 2005 and 2010, Armatrading served as president of the Women of the Year Lunch. She has been a trustee of the Prince's Trust since 2020 and an ambassador since 1983.

Armatrading entered into a civil partnership with artist Maggie Butler in Shetland, Scotland in 2011, the day after the Shetland Folk Festival, but does not talk publicly about being gay.

She lives in Surrey, where she owns Bumpkin Studios, a purpose-built recording facility in the grounds of her home where she has recorded most of her studio albums since Sleight of Hand (1986).

A younger brother, Tony Armatrading, was a stage, film, and television actor who lived in Los Angeles. He died of cancer on 10 May 2021, at the age of 59.

Armatrading was a guest at the coronation of Charles III and Camilla in 2023.

== Collaborations ==
Armatrading performed as a cameo vocalist for the song "Don't Lose Your Head" on the 1986 Queen album A Kind of Magic.

In 1997, she made an appearance on the charity single "Perfect Day".

Armatrading's song "In These Times" from her 2003 album Lovers Speak appeared on the compilation album Songs for Tibet: The Art of Peace which was released in 2008 by The Art of Peace Foundation.

== Honours ==
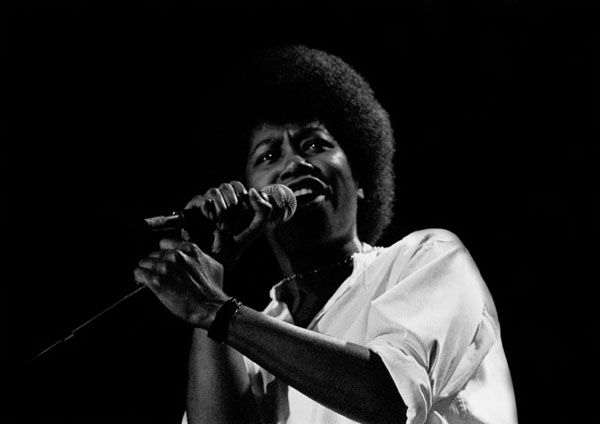
Armatrading performing at the National Stadium, Dublin, Ireland, in the early 1980s

Armatrading has been nominated three times for a Grammy Award and twice for a Brit Award as best female vocalist. She received an Ivor Novello Award for Outstanding Contemporary Song Collection in 1996. She has received honorary degrees from the Liverpool John Moores University (2000), the University of Birmingham (2002), the University of Northampton (2003), Aston University (2006), the Royal Scottish Academy of Music and Drama (2008), and the Open University and the University of the West Indies (2013). In 2022, she received an honorary doctorate from the University of St Andrews. She was appointed Member of the Order of the British Empire (MBE) in the 2001 Birthday Honours and Commander of the Order of the British Empire (CBE) in the 2020 Birthday Honours for services to music, charity and equal rights.

In October 2011, Armatrading was presented with a BASCA Gold Badge Award in recognition of her contribution to music. In May 2012, before her concert at Uttoxeter, as part of the 2012 Acoustic Festival of Britain, she was presented with a Lifetime Achievement Award.

In April 2016, she was presented with a Lifetime Achievement Award at the 2016 BBC Radio 2 Folk Awards in recognition of her "influence on a generation of singer-songwriters [as] one of the outstanding voices in British music since the 1970s".

In October 2022, Armatrading was made an Honorary Fellow of Newnham College, Cambridge. Delphine Mordey, Fellow and Director of Studies in Music, said: "We believe that Ms Armatrading embodies and lives the spirit of Newnham. Intellectually curious and focused on achieving her full potential, she is pioneering, inspiring, supporting and sharing."

Year	Ceremony	Category	Nominated work	Result
1980	Grammy Awards	Best Female Rock Vocal Performance	How Cruel	Nominated
1983	Grammy Awards	Best Female Rock Vocal Performance	The Key	Nominated
1987	Brit Awards	Best British Female Solo Artist	Joan Armatrading	Nominated
1996	Brit Awards	Best British Female Solo Artist	Joan Armatrading	Nominated
1996	Ivor Novello Awards	Outstanding Contemporary Song Collection	What's Inside	Won
2007	Grammy Awards	Best Contemporary Blues Album	Into the Blues	Nominated
2011	BASCA	Gold Badge Award	Joan Armatrading	Won
2016	BBC Radio 2 Folk Awards	Lifetime Achievement Award	Joan Armatrading	Won

== Discography ==
- Whatever's for Us (1972)
- Back to the Night (1975)
- Joan Armatrading (1976)
- Show Some Emotion (1977)
- To the Limit (1978)
- Me Myself I (1980)
- Walk Under Ladders (1981)
- The Key (1983)
- Secret Secrets (1985)
- Sleight of Hand (1986)
- The Shouting Stage (1988)
- Hearts and Flowers (1990)
- Square the Circle (1992)
- What's Inside (1995)
- Lovers Speak (2003)
- Into the Blues (2007)
- This Charming Life (2010)
- Starlight (2012)
- Not Too Far Away (2018)
- Consequences (2021)
- How Did This Happen and What Does It Now Mean (2024)
