= Whatever's for Us =

Studio album by Joan Armatrading
- Released: November 1972
- Studios: Château d'Hérouville, France, Trident and Marquee, London
- Genres: Pop, folk
- Length: 38:27
- Labels: Cube (UK); A&M (US)
- Producer: Gus Dudgeon

Joan Armatrading chronology
Whatever's for Us (1972)	Back to the Night (1975)

Whatever's for Us is the debut album of British singer-songwriter Joan Armatrading. The album was a collaboration between Armatrading and singer-songwriter Pam Nestor. At the time the two were musical partners and wrote over a hundred songs together. Armatrading sings lead vocals and plays piano and acoustic guitar, while Nestor co-wrote most of the songs.

== Background ==
Whatever's For Us was produced by Gus Dudgeon and was recorded over two weeks at Château d'Hérouville studios (then called Strawberry Studios), in the Oise valley, near Paris, and then at Trident Studios London and Marquee Studios, also in London. It was originally released in November 1972 by Cube Records (HIFLY 12). Cube originally intended to call the album Joan Armatrading, but Pam Nestor fought against this, as she had worked on over 100 songs for the album over a period of two to three years, playing piano and singing on many of them, and at the time of the album's recording, the two writers considered themselves a duo. Armatrading later said: "Pam and I worked very hard on the music and the songs for this album". In the event, none of the songs featuring Pam Nestor playing or singing were chosen for the album, as Cube wanted to promote Joan Armatrading as a solo artist.

Davey Johnstone, Gerry Conway and Ray Cooper, who performed on the album, were also working at the time with Cat Stevens and Elton John, both of whom also recorded at the Château d'Hérouville studios.

The album was re-released by A&M in 1974 when Armatrading signed for the label, and was then released as a CD in 1988 by Castle Communications, and released again in CD format in 2001, (the Metro re-master) with two bonus tracks: "Lonely Lady" and "Together in Words and Music", both written by Armatrading and Nestor and produced by Gus Dudgeon. The two songs were released as a single in June 1973 (BUG31).

The album was most recently re-released by EMI on 2 October 2001 and 27 April 2004 under the title Joan Armatrading: Singer Songwriter.

== The album ==
Whatever's for Us was the only album recorded by Joan Armatrading and Pam Nestor, and the first recorded example of Armatrading’s playing and singing, aside from demo tapes. Cube records released the album as a Joan Armatrading effort and gave little credit to Nestor, and this caused difficulties between the two writers. Armatrading set about releasing herself from her obligations to Cube and within a short time had signed to A&M Records instead. The Cube label did not last much longer and folded in the mid-1970s, becoming absorbed into Electric Records.

Whatever's for Us has traces of the hippie ethos which existed at the time, and many of the songs are influenced by folk music. The front cover, designed and drawn by the artist Sumiko, (now known as Sumiko Davies) shows an idyllic multiracial pastoral scene, complete with long hair, patterned skirts, flowers and psychedelia. It also features drawings of Pam Nestor and Joan Armatrading, with Armatrading holding a Father Christmas mascot that had been given to her by Nestor.

Demos for the album were recorded earlier in 1972 by Gus Dudgeon at the Marquee Studios, with Larry Steele on bass, Caleb Quaye on guitar and Roger Pope on drums.

'"It Could Have Been Better" is said to have been one of Elton John's favourite songs at that time. The song was used in the film Kill List in 2011, and in February 2012 it was also played as part of the Burberry Prorsum Women’s Wear Autumn/Winter 2012 fashion show in London. The song has also been praised by the broadcaster and writer Paul Gambaccini, who refers to it as "outstanding" and "beautiful". He also notes that at the time of the album's release: "critics were in awe of her (Armatrading's) compositional and vocalising skills".

"Visionary Mountains" was later covered by Manfred Mann's Earth Band on the album Nightingales & Bombers in 1975.

"My Family" was covered by New York rock group and art/performance collective MEN in 2011. It was also used in a BBC Radio 4 drama in 2011.

"City Girl" was written by Armatrading about Pam Nestor.

The song "All The King's Gardens" was one that had caught the eye of Gus Dudgeon when he was looking through the demo tapes. The title had intrigued him as it was the address where he had been living in West Hampstead at the time. Armatrading had seen the sign from a bus and had asked Nestor to write lyrics with that title, which she did.

"Head of the Table" is a song about interracial relationships and was based on Nestor’s experiences of the family of a white boyfriend she had at the time.

The first song Armatrading and Nestor ever wrote together was called "Darkness", but it didn't make it onto the final album.

The songs "My Family", "City Girl", "Whatever’s for Us, for Us", "Visionary Mountains", "It Could Have Been Better" and "Alice" later appeared on several of Armatrading’s compilation albums.

== Release and reception ==
Professional ratings
Review scores
Source	Rating
AllMusic	2/5 stars
The Encyclopedia of Popular Music	3/5 stars
The Rolling Stone Record Guide	2/5 stars

Armatrading outside Ronnie Scott's in 1973

The album was critically well received, although not a commercial success. Penny Valentine, of Sounds, commented: "Whatever's for Us is a brilliant, crushing album – the kind of collection that you may have despaired of ever hearing from anyone in England."

Derek Jewell, writing in the Sunday Times in 1972 commented: "this country has produced at last, from the new generation, a black singer of total individuality. Her name, Joan Armatrading, her first album, Whatever’s for Us, is sizzling."

Mark Plummer of Melody Maker commented that: "her voice is powerful, something like Nina Simone's", and "what hits you are the earthy songs written by Joan and Pam Nestor" and that the album "has quality stamped all over it".

Armatrading’s first public appearance, performing songs from the album, was at Ronnie Scott’s in late 1972. She performed with Joe Partridge on guitar, Larry Steele on bass and Henry Spinetti on drums. On 7 December 1972 she opened for JSD, a folk band, at the Fairfield Halls in Croydon. In early 1973 she embarked on a European tour, supporting José Feliciano, and this was followed by a two-week residency at Ronnie Scott’s in April 1973. Later in 1973 she undertook a solo tour of USA folk clubs.

Armatrading later commented that she was glad the album hadn't been a success, as she felt she "wouldn’t have been able to cope with it" at the time.

== Track listing ==
All tracks composed by Joan Armatrading and Pam Nestor, except where indicated.

=== Side 1 ===
1 "My Family" 3:08

- Joan Armatrading – vocals, piano, harmonium
- Davey Johnstone – acoustic guitars
- Larry Steele – bass

2 "City Girl" (Armatrading) 3:58

- Joan Armatrading – vocals, acoustic guitars
- Davey Johnstone – acoustic guitars
- Larry Steele – bass
- Gerry Conway – drums
- Strings arranged by Del Newman

3 "Spend a Little Time" (Armatrading) 2:23

- Joan Armatrading – vocals, piano, acoustic guitar
- Davey Johnstone – electric guitar
- Larry Steele – bass
- Gerry Conway – drums
- Ray Cooper – percussion

4 "Whatever's for Us, for Us" 2:11

- Joan Armatrading – vocals, acoustic guitars

5 "Child Star" 2:31

- Joan Armatrading – vocals, acoustic guitars

6 "Visionary Mountains" 1:49

- Joan Armatrading – vocals, piano
- Davey Johnstone – sitar

7 "It Could Have Been Better" 4:19

- Joan Armatrading – vocals, piano
- Larry Steele – bass
- Gerry Conway – drums
- Strings and French horns arranged by Del Newman

=== Side 2 ===
1 "Head of the Table" 2:30

- Joan Armatrading – vocals, piano
- Davey Johnstone – acoustic guitar
- Larry Steele – bass
- Ray Cooper – percussion
- Gerry Conway – drums

2 "Mister Remember Me" 2:15

- Joan Armatrading – vocals, piano
- Jean Roussel – organ
- Davey Johnstone – acoustic guitars
- Larry Steele – bass
- Henry Spinetti – drums

3 "Gave It a Try" 2:08

- Joan Armatrading – vocals, acoustic guitars
- Strings arranged by Del Newman

4 "Alice" 3:29

- Joan Armatrading – vocals, piano, harmonium
- Davey Johnstone – acoustic & electric guitars
- Ray Cooper – vibes
- Larry Steele – bass
- Gerry Conway – drums

5 "Conversation" (Armatrading) 2:15

- Joan Armatrading – vocals, piano
- Davey Johnstone – acoustic guitar
- Ray Cooper – bell trees

6 "Mean Old Man" 2:33

- Joan Armatrading – vocals, acoustic guitar
- Davey Johnstone – electric guitar
- Larry Steele – bass
- Gerry Conway – drums
- Ray Cooper – percussion
- Brass arranged by Chris Hughes

7 "All the King’s Gardens" 2:58

- Joan Armatrading – vocals, acoustic guitars
- Davey Johnstone – acoustic guitar
- Larry Steele – bass
- Gerry Conway – drums
- Ray Cooper – percussion
- Brass by Chris Hughes

== Personnel ==
Musicians

- Joan Armatrading – vocals, piano, acoustic guitar, harmonium
- Davey Johnstone – acoustic guitar, electric guitar, sitar
- Larry Steele – bass guitar
- Chris Hughes – saxophone
- Jean Alain Roussel – organ
- Gerry Conway – drums
- Henry Spinetti – drums
- Ray Cooper – percussion, vibraphone

Production

- Producer: Gus Dudgeon
- Engineers: Robin Geoffrey Cable, Ken Scott, Roy Baker, Phil Dunne.
- String and horns arrangements: Del Newman
- Brass arrangements: Chris Hughes
- Art Direction: John Hays
- Cover design: Sumiko Davies
- Photography: Derek Davies

== Other sources ==
- Sleeve notes: Whatever’s For Us, 1972, Cube Records (HIFLY12)
- Gambaccini, Paul. Joan Armatrading: Starlight Tour 2012 – official programme
- Gaar, Gillian G (1993) She's A Rebel: The History of Women in Rock and Roll, Blandford ISBN 0-7137-2379-3
- Irwin, Colin (15 July 1978). Joan Flies with the Wild Geese, Melody Maker, pages 32 & 33, IPC Press, London.
- Plummer, Mark (25 November 1972) 'ark at Joan, Melody Maker, pages 13 & 14, IPC Press, London.
- Mayes, Sean (1990). Joan Armatrading – A Biography (unauthorised). Weidenfeld and Nicolson. ISBN 0-297-81058-8.
