= Show Some Emotion (album) =

Studio album by Joan Armatrading
- Released: September 1977
- Recorded: 1977
- Studio: Olympic (London)
- Genre: Pop; rock
- Length: 37:12
- Label: A&M
- Producer: Glyn Johns

Joan Armatrading chronology
Joan Armatrading (1976)	Show Some Emotion (1977)	To the Limit (1978)

Show Some Emotion is the fourth studio album by British singer-songwriter Joan Armatrading, released in 1977 on A&M. It reached No. 6 on the UK Albums Chart, No. 52 on the US Billboard 200 albums chart, and No. 18 on the Australian Kent Music Report albums chart.

Armatrading's 1979 live album Steppin' Out contains two tracks from Show Some Emotion, "Mama Mercy" and "Kissin' and a Huggin'".

== Reception ==
Professional ratings
Review scores
Source	Rating
AllMusic	3/5 stars
Robert Christgau	B+
The Encyclopedia of Popular Music	3/5 stars
MusicHound Rock: The Essential Album Guide	3/5 stars
The Rolling Stone Album Guide	4/5 stars

In a review for AllMusic, Dave Connolly wrote that he did not enjoy the album as much as her previous album, declaring that much of it was "like outtakes from that effort". He criticised the lyrics and arrangements, as well as the track placement. However, he praised "Show Some Emotion" and "Willow" as highlights. Robert Christgau, on the other hand, called Armatrading "sometimes funny, always real, and never ever pretentious", but wrote that "most of the meaning of the ordinary-plus lyrics is conveyed by stance and nuance". Trouser Press called Show Some Emotion a "lovely ... casual-sounding album of songs that, if not among her best, are more than presentable and occasionally captivating". The Washington Post wrote that "Armatrading combines influences from her native West Indies and adopted England, and her voice projects both tenderness and power".

== Track listing ==
All tracks composed by Joan Armatrading.

Side one

1. "Woncha Come On Home" – 2:40
2. "Show Some Emotion" – 3:31
3. "Warm Love" – 3:04
4. "Never Is Too Late" – 5:32
5. "Peace in Mind" – 3:19

Side two

1. "Opportunity" – 3:25
2. "Mama Mercy" – 2:47
3. "Get in the Sun" – 3:19
4. "Willow" – 4:53
5. "Kissin' and a Huggin'" – 4:42

== Personnel ==
- Joan Armatrading – lead vocals, acoustic guitar; kalimba (1)
- Jerry Donahue – electric guitar (all tracks); slide guitar (6)
- Bryan Garofalo – bass guitar
- Dave Markee – bass
- Georgie Fame – Fender Rhodes electric piano
- John "Rabbit" Bundrick – Hammond organ (all tracks except 5)
- Tim Hinkley – Hammond organ (5), piano (10)
- Mel Collins – Selmer Mark VI saxophone (7, 10)
- David Kemper – drums (all of Side 1 except 3; tracks 7–9)
- Kenney Jones – drums (6)
- Henry Spinetti – drums (3, 10)
- Joe Scott – background vocals (6, 8)
- Clarke Peters credited as Pete Clarke – background vocals (6, 8)
- Brian Rogers – string arrangement and conductor (3)

Technical

- Glyn Johns – producer, engineer
- Jon Astley – assistant engineer
- Fabio Nicoli – art direction
- Nick Marshall – design
- David Montgomery – sleeve photography
