= Me Myself I =

Studio album by Joan Armatrading
- Released: May 1980
- Recorded: March 1980
- Studio: The Record Plant, New York City
- Genre: Rock
- Length: 35:48
- Label: A&M
- Producer: Richard Gottehrer

Joan Armatrading chronology
How Cruel (1979)	Me Myself I (1980)	Walk Under Ladders (1981)

Singles from Me Myself I
- 1. "Me Myself I" Released: 6 June 1980; 2. "All the Way from America" Released: August 1980; 3. "Simon" Released: October 1980

Professional ratings
Review scores
Source	Rating
AllMusic	4.5/5 stars
Christgau's Record Guide	B+
The Encyclopedia of Popular Music	4/5 stars
Rolling Stone	(favorable)
Smash Hits	6/10

Me Myself I is the sixth studio album by British recording artist Joan Armatrading. Released in May 1980, the album was Armatrading's highest ever chart placing both in the UK (number 5) and in the US (number 28). In Australia, the album peaked at number 13. It was certified "Gold" in the UK by the BPI in July 1980.

The title track became one of her most successful singles, peaking at number 21 over an 11-week stay in the UK Singles Chart. It was also used in the soundtrack of an Australian movie of the same title made in 1999. "All the Way from America" was a minor hit, peaking at number 54 in the UK chart.

== Track listing ==
All tracks are written by Joan Armatrading.

Side one
No.	Title	Length
1.	"Me Myself I"	3:16
2.	"Ma-Me-O-Beach"	3:00
3.	"Friends"	3:05
4.	"Is It Tomorrow Yet"	3:31
5.	"Turn Out the Light"	4:19

Side two
No.	Title	Length
6.	"When You Kisses Me"	3:14
7.	"All the Way from America"	4:49
8.	"Feeling in My Heart (For You)"	3:36
9.	"Simon"	3:40
10.	"I Need You"	2:44

== Personnel ==
- Joan Armatrading – 12-string acoustic guitar, vocals
- Chris Spedding – guitar
- Hiram Bullock – guitar
- Richard Hirsh – guitar (3)
- Danny Federici – organ
- Paul Shaffer – piano
- Clifford Carter – piano (6)
- Phillip St. John – piano (4)
- Tom Sowell – synthesiser
- Clarence Clemons – saxophone
- Will Lee – bass
- Marcus Miller – bass (1, 4)
- Anton Fig – drums
- George Kerr, Sammy Turner – background vocals (5)

Technical

- Thom Panunzio – engineer
- Gregg Caruso – assistant engineer
- Chuck Beeson – art direction, design
- Brian Hagiwara – photography

== Charts ==
=== Weekly charts ===
Chart (1980)	Peak position
Australian Albums (Kent Music Report)	13
Austrian Albums (Ö3 Austria)	12
Dutch Albums (Album Top 100)	5
German Albums (Offizielle Top 100)	23
Norwegian Albums (VG-lista)	2
New Zealand Albums (RMNZ)	4
Swedish Albums (Sverigetopplistan)	15
UK Albums (OCC)	5
US Billboard 200	28

=== Year-end charts ===
Chart (1980)	Position
New Zealand Albums (RMNZ)	14

== Certifications ==
Region	Certification	Certified units/sales
Australia (ARIA)	Platinum	50,000^{^}
^{^} Shipments figures based on certification alone.
