= Love and Affection =

1976 single by Joan Armatrading

Single by Joan Armatrading

from the album Joan Armatrading
- B-side: "Help Yourself"
- Released: 27 August 1976
- Recorded: 1974/1975
- Genre: Folk; pop
- Length: 4:28
- Label: A&M
- Songwriter: Joan Armatrading
- Producer: Glyn Johns

Joan Armatrading singles chronology
"Dry Land" (1975)	"Love and Affection" (1976)	"Down to Zero" (1977)

Music video
- "Love and Affection" on YouTube

"Love and Affection" is a song by Kittitian-English singer-songwriter Joan Armatrading. Her fourth single, and her third for A&M Records, it was her first chart success. It reached number 10 in the UK Singles Chart in November 1976. One of her best-known recordings, it has been described as a "deceptively feisty ballad ... an instant classic." It appeared on her eponymous third album. The song has twice been used as the title track of compilation albums, for 1999's Love and Affection: The Best of Joan Armatrading and 2003's Love and Affection: Classics 1975–1983.

The male backing vocal, which has been described as a "honeyed baritone", was performed by American actor and singer Clarke Peters. The alto saxophone was by Gallagher and Lyle session player Jimmy Jewell.

== Personnel ==
- Joan Armatrading – vocals, 6 & 12-string acoustic guitars
- Jerry Donahue – acoustic & electric guitars
- Jimmy Jewell – alto saxophone
- Dave Markee – bass guitar
- Dave Mattacks – drums
- Leroy Champaign – backing vocals
- Clarke Peters – backing vocals

== Charts ==
Chart (1976)	Peak position
Ireland (IRMA)	16
UK Singles (OCC)	10

1991 remix

Chart (1991)	Peak position
UK Singles (Official Charts)	91

== Certifications ==
Region	Certification	Certified units/sales
United Kingdom (BPI)	Silver	200,000^{‡}
^{‡} Sales+streaming figures based on certification alone.

== Sinitta version ==
"Love and Affection"

Single by Sinitta
- Released: 1990
- Genre: Dance-pop
- Length: 4:11
- Label: Fanfare
- Songwriter: Joan Armatrading
- Producer: Barry Andrews

Sinitta singles chronology
"Hitchin' a Ride" (1990)	"Love and Affection" (1990)	"Shame, Shame, Shame" (1992)

Music video
- "Love and Affection" on YouTube

In 1990 British singer Sinitta covered "Love and Affection". It was produced by Barry Anthony Andrews and released as a non-album single. The single peaked at number 62 in the UK.

=== Critical reception ===
David Giles from Music Week wrote, "Dance interpretation of the Joan Armatrading classic that works well, if only because it adapts the original rather more cleverly into dancefloor mode than the recent Loving You did. Enormous hit potential here."

=== Charts ===
Chart (1990)	Peak position
UK Singles (OCC)	62

== Mr Pink presents The Program version ==
A house music version by Mr Pink presents The Program, with Mr Pink (real name Leiam Sullivan) and Dave Lee (see Dave Lee discography), reached #22 in the UK charts in 2002.

=== Charts ===
Chart (2002)	Peak position
UK Singles (OCC)	22

== Other cover versions ==
- Sheena Easton covered "Love and Affection" on her 1984 platinum album A Private Heaven.
- Martha Davis (of the Motels) and Sly Stone perform a duet of the song which appeared on the 1986 soundtrack for Soul Man.
- Melissa Etheridge performed the song in 1996, live on the VH1 channel, with Joan Osborne, Paula Cole, Jewel and a backing band.
- Kate Ceberano recorded a version for her 1996 album Blue Box. It was released as the third single from that album.
- The song was covered by Two Nice Girls in a medley with the Velvet Underground's "Sweet Jane" and later by Courtney Pine and Kele Le Roc.
- Daley covered "Love and Affection" (retitled "Love + Affection") for his 2014 album Days & Nights.
- Dutch singer Mathilde Santing covered the song on her album Under a Blue Roof (1994).
- Richard Ashcroft's song "Lover" (2025) samples the original song. It uses a prominent interpolation of Armatrading's song and received her blessing and her approval of how Ashcroft used her track.
