= Fischer-Z discography =

- Studio albums: 13
- EPs: 5
- Live albums: 2
- Compilation albums: 8
- Singles: 39
- Video albums: 2

This is the discography of British rock band Fischer-Z.

== Albums ==
=== Studio albums ===
Title	Album details	Peak chart positions				
Title	Album details	UK	AUS	BEL (FL)	GER	NL
Word Salad	Released: 4 May 1979; Label: United Artists; Formats: LP, MC	66	—	—	—	21
Going Deaf for a Living	Released: May 1980; Label: United Artists; Formats: LP, MC, 8-track	—	52	—	—	6
Red Skies Over Paradise	Released: March 1981; Label: Liberty; Formats: LP, MC	—	70	—	6	2
Reveal	Released: October 1987; Label: Ariola; Formats: CD, LP, MC	—	93	—	49	—
Fish's Head	Released: 1 May 1989; Label: Ariola; Formats: CD, LP, MC	—	139	—	56	—
Destination Paradise	Released: October 1992; Label: Harvest; Formats: CD, LP, MC	—	—	—	93	—
Kamikaze Shirt	Released: September 1993; Label: Harvest, Welfare; Formats: CD, LP, MC	—	—	—	—	—
Stream	Released: January 1995; Label: SPV Recordings; Formats: CD	—	—	—	80	—
Ether	Released: 29 April 2002; Label: So-Real; Formats: CD, MC	—	—	—	—	—
This Is My Universe	Released: 17 April 2015; Label: Fischer-Z Music; Formats: CD	—	—	—	—	—
Building Bridges	Released: 31 March 2017; Label: BMG; Formats: CD, LP, digital download	—	—	—	—	—
Swimming in Thunderstorms	Released: 13 September 2019; Label: So-Real; Formats: CD, LP, digital download	—	—	126	—	—
Til the Oceans Overflow	Released: 8 October 2021; Label: So-Real; Formats: CD, LP, digital download	—	—	—	81	—
Triptych	Released: 26 April 2024; Label: So-Real; Formats: CD, LP, digital download	—	—	—	—	—
"—" denotes releases that did not chart or were not released in that territory.

=== Live albums ===
Title	Album details
Live at Rockpalast 1982	Released: 25 April 2014; Label: Repertoire; Formats: CD+DVD, digital download
Lockdown Sessions 2020	Released: 10 June 2020; Label: Self-released; Formats: CD
Live in Hamburg	Released: May 2024; Label: Self-released; Formats: CD

=== Compilation albums ===
Title	Album details
Going Red for a Salad – The UA Years	Released: 14 May 1990; Label: EMI; Formats: CD, LP, MC
Still in Flames	Released: June 1995; Label: Welfare; Formats: CD
The Best	Released: August 1995; Label: EMI Electrola; Formats: CD, 2xLP, MC
The Gold Collection	Released: 1997; Label: EMI; Formats: CD
The Worker	Released: 1997; Label: Disky; Formats: CD
The Perfect Album	Released: 1998; Label: BMG; Formats: CD
The Very Best Fischer Z Album Ever	Released: November 2001; Label: EMI; Formats: CD
Highlights 1979 to 2004	Released: 30 August 2004; Label: EMI/So-Real; Formats: 2xCD

=== Video albums ===
Title	Album details
The Garden Party	Released: 2004; Label: EMI/So-Real; Formats: DVD
Greatest Hits Live	Released: 25 July 2005; Label: Quantum Leap; Formats: DVD

== EPs ==
Title	Album details
Fischer-Z Over Germany	Released: 1981; Label: Liberty; Formats: 12"
B-Sides & Rarities | V1	Released: 26 August 2015; Label: Self-released; Formats: digital download
F01	Released: 6 April 2018; Label: Self-released; Formats: digital download
B Sides & Rarities | V2	Released: 20 May 2020; Label: Self-released; Formats: digital download
S.I.T Annexe	Released: 29 May 2020; Label: So-Real; Formats: 12", digital download

== Singles ==
Title	Year	Peak chart positions							Album
Title	Year	UK	AUS	BEL (FL)	GER	NL	POR	SPA	Album
"Wax Dolls"	1978	—	—	—	—	—	—	—	Word Salad
"Remember Russia"	1979	—	—	—	—	—	—	—	Word Salad
"The Worker"	1979	53	—	23	—	26	—	—	Word Salad
"First Impressions (Pretty Paracetamol)"	1979	—	—	—	—	—	—	—	Word Salad
"So Long"	1980	72	15	14	—	12	5	—	Going Deaf for a Living
"Crazy Girl"	1980	—	—	—	—	—	—	—	Going Deaf for a Living
"Room Service	1980	—	—	—	—	41	—	—	Going Deaf for a Living
"Limbo"	1980	—	—	—	—	41	—	—	Going Deaf for a Living
"Marliese"	1981	—	—	21	37	5	1	14	Red Skies Over Paradise
"'Cutter's Lullaby"	1981	—	—	—	—	—	—	—	Red Skies Over Paradise
"Berlin"	1981	—	—	—	—	—	—	—	Red Skies Over Paradise
"El Escritor" (Spanish release of "The Writer")	1981	—	—	—	—	—	—	—	Red Skies Over Paradise
"The Perfect Day"	1987	91	12	—	—	—	—	—	Reveal
"Big Drum"	1988	—	—	—	—	—	—	—	Reveal
"Say No"	1989	—	168	—	—	—	—	—	Fish's Head
"Masquerade"	1989	—	—	—	—	—	—	—	Fish's Head
"Sausages and Tears" (credited to John Watts and Fischer Z)	1990	—	—	—	—	—	—	—	Non-album single
"Destination Paradise"	1992	—	—	—	—	—	—	—	Destination Paradise
"Will You Be There?"	1992	—	153	—	95	—	—	—	Destination Paradise
"Tightrope"	1993	—	—	—	—	—	—	—	Destination Paradise
"Caruso"	1993	—	—	—	—	—	—	—	Destination Paradise
"The Peaches & Cream"	1993	—	—	—	—	—	—	—	Kamikaze Shirt
"Human Beings"	1994	—	—	—	—	—	—	—	Kamikaze Shirt
"Marlon"	1994	—	—	—	—	—	—	—	Kamikaze Shirt
"You Never Cross the Same River Twice (Turn Back the Clock)"	1994	—	—	—	—	—	—	—	Stream
"Need Protection"	1995	—	—	—	—	—	—	—	Stream
"Red Skies Over Paradise" (1995 recording)	1995	—	—	—	—	—	—	—	The Best
"Jukebox"	2002	—	—	—	—	—	—	—	Ether
"Delight"	2002	—	—	—	—	—	—	—	Ether
"Back to Berlin"	2004	—	—	—	—	—	—	—	Highlights 1979 to 2004
"Damascus Disco"	2017	—	—	—	—	—	—	—	Building Bridges
"So Close" (Underwater Version)	2017	—	—	—	—	—	—	—	Non-album single
"Stolen"	2018	—	—	—	—	—	—	—	Swimming in Thunderstorms
"Big Wide World"	2019	—	—	—	—	—	—	—	Swimming in Thunderstorms
"Love Train Drama"	2019	—	—	—	—	—	—	—	Swimming in Thunderstorms
"Cardboard Street"	2019	—	—	—	—	—	—	—	Swimming in Thunderstorms
"Choose"	2020	—	—	—	—	—	—	—	Til the Oceans Overflow
"Same Boat"	2021	—	—	—	—	—	—	—	Til the Oceans Overflow
"A.I.Owns.U."	2022	—	—	—	—	—	—	—	Til the Oceans Overflow
"—" denotes releases that did not chart or were not released in that territory.
