= Kind Words =

Kind Words may refer to:

- Kind Words (video game), 2019 video game
- Kind Words (And a Real Good Heart), 1986 song by Joan Armatrading
- KindWords, word processor
- The Kind Words, 2015 film
