= Love by You =

1985 single by Joan Armatrading

Single by Joan Armatrading

from the album Secret Secrets
- B-side: "Read It Write"
- Released: 2 September 1985
- Length: 3:15
- Label: A&M
- Songwriter: Joan Armatrading
- Producer: Mike Howlett

Joan Armatrading singles chronology
"Thinking Man" (1985)	"Love by You" (1985)	"Kind Words (And a Real Good Heart)" (1986)

Audio
- "Love by You" on YouTube

"Love by You" is a song by English singer-songwriter Joan Armatrading, released on 2 September 1985 by A&M Records as the third and final single from her ninth studio album, Secret Secrets (1985). The song, which was written by Armatrading and produced by Mike Howlett, features Joe Jackson on piano.

== Background ==
"Love by You" was recorded with Armatrading's fellow A&M Records artist Joe Jackson making a guest appearance on piano. The two artists had previously discussed collaborating on something, originally for Jackson's Body and Soul album, but this did not come to fruition. They met again at the 26th Annual Grammy Awards in 1984 and the idea of working together came up in conversation again, but this time for Armatrading's upcoming album Secrets Secrets. Jackson contributed by playing keyboards on "Talking to the Wall", which Armatrading said was an easy choice for him to play on as the song was "right up his street". Armatrading then wrote "Love by You" the night before it was recorded as she wanted a track for the album which would feature only her and Jackson.

Armatrading has described "Love by You" as a "ballad". She wanted the song to portray a sense of vulnerability and intimacy. Speaking to Rolling Stone in 1985, Armatrading said, "I wanted it to be that wide open. When we were playing it, I wanted it to be intimate and really personal, just these two people being private together." In a 1985 interview, Armatrading praised Jackson as an "excellent musician".

On 23 April 1985, Jackson made a one-off guest appearance during Armatrading's concert at the Radio City Music Hall in Manhattan, New York City, to perform on "Talking to the Wall" and "Love by You".

== Release ==
"Love by You" was released by A&M Records in the UK only on 2 September 1985. It was the third and final single to be released from Secrets Secrets, which had been released in the UK seven months earlier. The B-side, "Read It Write", was a previously unreleased non-album track from the Secrets Secrets sessions.

"Love by You" failed to reach the top 100 of the UK singles chart. However, it did make an appearance for three consecutive weeks on the Music Week Airplay listings, based on the airplay it received on Independent Local Radio, in September 1985.

On 1 October 1985, Armatrading narrowly escaped serious injury when she was driving her car into central London for promotional activities relating to the single. After breaking hard on the A3 road in Kingston Vale area, her car swerved across two lanes, collided with another car, then climbed up an embankment and crashed into a front garden. Both Armatrading and the driver of the other car involved escaped with minor injuries.

== Critical reception ==
Upon its release as a single, Pat Thomas of Number One noted Armatrading's "strong and interesting voice" on the "lovely, gentle song", although she admitted she "can't see it taking off" commercially. Steve Hartley of the Hartlepool Mail wrote, "Not one of her more commercial offerings but this moody ballad confirms why she's still regarded as one of our premier lady songwriters." John Lee of the Huddersfield Daily Examiner called it a "splendid, classy ballad" and added, "She's certainly one of the best songwriters around, and her distinctive voice is as powerful and soulful as any you could hope to hear." Frank Edmonds of the Bury Free Press gave it an 8 out of 10 rating, praising it as a "beautiful song performed to simple piano backing and sung with aching sincerity". He continued, "This is best heard in the early hours of the morning, when you are wretchedly miserable and blind drunk."

Stewart Peterson of the Greenock Telegraph described the song as a "nice ballad" with "super piano accompaniment by Joe Jackson". He continued, "Even not being an Armatrading fan, this one is more than acceptable and worthy of cracking the top 30." Rupert Mostyn of the Bournemouth Evening Echo praised it as a "beautiful, piano accompanied ballad". Paul Benbow of the Reading Evening Post was less impressed with the song, writing, "Joe Jackson tickles the ivories on this tune with the same aim but not half the class as 'Love and Affection'". Sandy Robertson of Sounds was also negative, "Joan bumbles over meandering ivories as if cutting some filler for halfway thru the second side of a dire double album."

== Track listings ==
7–inch and 10-inch single (UK)

1. "Love by You" – 3:15
2. "Read It Write" – 3:53

== Personnel ==
"Love by You"

- Joan Armatrading – vocals
- Joe Jackson – piano

Production

- Mike Howlett – production
- Bryan New – engineering
- Jon Hallett – engineering assistance
- Steve McLaughlin – engineering assistance

Other

- Paul Cox – back cover photography
