= Why Do You Run? =

Single by The Ward Brothers

from the album Madness of It All
- Released: 1987
- Length: 5:12 (album version); 4:40 (single version)
- Label: Siren; A&M (US)
- Songwriter(s): Graham Ward
- Producer(s): Mike Howlett

The Ward Brothers singles chronology
"Cross That Bridge" (1986)	"Why Do You Run?" (1987)	"I Trusted You" (1987)

"Why Do You Run?" is a song by British pop-rock band the Ward Brothers, which was released in 1987 as the third single from their debut studio album Madness of It All. The song was written by Graham Ward and produced by Mike Howlett. As the follow-up to the band's UK Top 40 hit "Cross That Bridge", "Why Do You Run?" reached No. 81 on the UK Singles Chart and remained in the Top 100 for two weeks.

The song's music video was directed by Vaughan Arnell and Anthea Benton. "Why Do You Run?" was also featured in the 1987 American buddy cop action comedy film Stakeout.

== Critical reception ==
On its release, Music & Media picked the song as one of their "sure hits" in March 1987. They commented on the song's "good hook" and added that it was "convincingly sung". Bobby Lynch of The Kerryman wrote, "Hot on the heels of "Cross That Bridge", the Ward Brothers have made a real stomper that needs the attention of day time radio right now. A grower." John Lee of the Huddersfield Daily Examiner felt the song could "hardly be described as a blockbuster", but noted the "neat melody" and "nasal guitar sound". He described it as a "definite improvement" over the band's previous single "Cross That Bridge" which he wasn't "overly-impressed" by.

James Grant, as guest reviewer for Record Mirror, considered it to be a "fifth rate bastard son" of Bruce Springsteen's 1984 song "Downbound Train". He felt the song "tries to give a passionate impression and fails miserably". In the US, Billboard listed the single under "new and noteworthy" and described the track as a "midtempo rocker" and "convincing U.S. debut", with "ringing guitars, earnest vocal [and] firm melody".

== Track listing ==
7" single

1. "Why Do You Run?" - 4:40
2. "Madness of It All (Was Once and Still Is)" (Instrumental Version) - 5:14

7" single (US promo)

1. "Why Do You Run?" - 4:40
2. "Why Do You Run?" - 4:40

12" single

1. "Why Do You Run?" (US Mix) - 5:20
2. "Don't Talk to Strangers" (Summerlane Walkman Mix) - 5:32
3. "Madness of It All" (Instrumental) - 5:14

12" single (UK #2)

1. "Why Do You Run?" (Krypt Kickers Mix) - 8:24
2. "Why Do You Run?" - 4:40
3. "Madness of It All (Was Once and Still Is)" (Instrumental Version) - 5:14

CD single

1. "Why Do You Run?" (7" Version) - 4:40
2. "Why Do You Run?" (12" Re-mix) - 8:24
3. "Don't Talk to Strangers" (Instrumental) - 5:32
4. "Madness of It All" (Instrumental) - 5:14

== Personnel ==
The Ward Brothers

- Dave Ward - lead vocals, backing vocals, drums, percussion, arranger
- Derek Ward - keyboards, programming, arranger
- Graham Ward - guitar, backing vocals, arranger

Additional musicians

- Martin Bullard - synth bass, keyboards
- Wesley Magoogan - saxophone (track 1)

Production

- Mike Howlett - producer
- Steve Power - engineer
- Don Was, Frank Filipetti - producers of "Madness of It All"
- Jay Burnett - remixer on "Why Do You Run?" (Krypt Kickers Mix)
- Derek Ward, Ross Stapleton - producers of "Don't Talk to Strangers" (Little Sony Mix)

Other

- The Design Clinic - sleeve design

== Charts ==
=== Weekly charts ===
Chart (1987)	Peak position
Italy Airplay (Music & Media)	18
UK Singles (OCC)	81
