= Reach Out (Joan Armatrading song) =

1986 single by Joan Armatrading

Single by Joan Armatrading

from the album Sleight of Hand
- B-side: "The River's On Fire"
- Released: 14 July 1986
- Length: 4:18
- Label: A&M
- Songwriter: Joan Armatrading
- Producer: Joan Armatrading

Joan Armatrading singles chronology
"Kind Words (And a Real Good Heart)" (1986)	"Reach Out" (1986)	"Jesse" (1986)

Audio
- "Reach Out" on YouTube

"Reach Out" is a song by English singer-songwriter Joan Armatrading, released on 14 July 1986 by A&M Records as the second single from her tenth studio album, Sleight of Hand (1986). The song was written and produced by Armatrading.

== Background ==
While the majority of Armatrading's songs have been written based on things she has observed or heard from others, "Reach Out" was inspired by her own personal experience. The song's title was inspired by the Four Tops' 1967 hit single "Reach Out I'll Be There" and their album Reach Out.

== Release ==
"Reach Out" was released as a single on 14 July 1986. It failed to enter the UK singles chart, but did make an appearance for two consecutive weeks on the Music Week Airplay chart based on the airplay it received from regional radio stations.

== Critical reception ==
Upon its release as a single, John Gibson of the Edinburgh Evening News praised "Reach Out" as Armatrading's "strongest single in months" and one that shows her "good taste and considerable talent". Alan Poole of the Northamptonshire Evening Telegraph summarised, "Anybody with any real sense of musical quality and value for money will plump for the Sleight of Hand album from whence this comes, but one way or another it's a must." David Alpin of the Halifax Evening Courier stated, "S-s-strrretch over and y-yes, powerful as ever." A reviewer for the Derby Evening Telegraph felt that A&M "keep releasing the wrong tracks from Armatrading's LPs as singles". They considered "Reach Out" to be a "great song" but not a "good choice for a single" as it "works far more as an LP track".

John Lee of the Huddersfield Daily Examiner believed that, by Armatrading's standards, "Reach Out" was "pretty mediocre" and he did not "envisage it becoming a hit of any notable size". Graeme Fort of the Lancashire Evening Telegraph noted the song contained "more vocal magic from Joan", but added that he did not think it was "quite up to the standard we've come to expect". He gave it a 50/50 chart chance. Howard Wheatcroft of The Northern Echo noted, "She's been making records like this for ages, but the guitar ruins any sensitivity here." A reviewer for the Greenock Telegraph noted Armatrading's "decent enough vocal performance" and the "crystal clear production" but asked, "Can she really see a song totally devoid of a hook-line making it into the charts? Musicianship solid, nice lyrics, but what we need is a bit of excitement – and fast!"

== Live performances ==
"Reach Out" was performed on the US and UK tours promoting Sleight of Hand in 1986. On 20 June 1986, Armatrading, backed by an "All Star Band", which included Eric Clapton and Mark Knopfler (guitar), Elton John (piano), Phil Collins (drums), performed the song at the Prince's Trust All-Star Rock Concert at Wembley Arena to celebrate the 10th anniversary of the Trust. The performance was subsequently released on VHS as The Prince's Trust Birthday Party.

== Track listings ==
7–inch single (UK)

1. "Reach Out" – 4:18
2. "The River's On Fire" – 4:16

7–inch single (Germany)

1. "Reach Out" – 4:18
2. "Killing Time" – 3:58

== Personnel ==
- Joan Armatrading – vocals, guitar
- Alex White – keyboards
- Wesley Magoogan – saxophone
- Steve Greetham – bass
- Geoff Dugmore – drums

Production

- Joan Armatrading – production
- Steve Lillywhite – mixing ("Reach Out", "Killing Time")
- Mark Wallis – mixing ("The River's On Fire"), engineering

Other

- Michael Ross – photography
