= Cross That Bridge (song) =

Single by The Ward Brothers

from the album Madness of It All
- B-side: "Cross That Bridge (Instrumental)"
- Released: 17 November 1986
- Length: 3:47
- Label: Siren; A&M (US)
- Songwriter(s): Graham Ward
- Producer(s): Don Was; Phil Brown

The Ward Brothers singles chronology
"Easy Prey" (1986)	"Cross That Bridge" (1986)	"Why Do You Run?" (1987)

"Cross That Bridge" is a song by British pop-rock band the Ward Brothers, which was released in 1986 as the second single from their debut studio album Madness of It All. It was written by Graham Ward, and produced by Don Was and Phil Brown.

"Cross That Bridge" reached No. 32 on the UK Singles Chart and remained in the Top 100 for ten weeks. It was the band's only UK Top 40 hit. The song's music video was directed by Meiert Avis. It was filmed both inside and outside the Thames Barrier, with other segments filmed on a sound stage.

== Critical reception ==
On its release, Danny Van Emden of Music Week noted the song's "warm, insistent soul hook" which he considered to be "reminiscent of Was (Not Was)". John Lee of the Huddersfield Daily Examiner praised it as a "smart toe-tapper" which he felt "given the push, could pilot the Ward Brothers ship into big-buck harbour". In a review of Madness of It All, Robin Denselow of The Guardian commented, "The Ward Brothers are best-known for their light and tuneful single "Cross That Bridge", which is the best song here. The rest of the LP sounds classy but anonymous." Jack Lloyd of The Philadelphia Inquirer described the song as an "above-average number".

== Track listing ==
7" single

1. "Cross That Bridge" - 3:47
2. "Cross That Bridge" (Instrumental) - 4:16

7" single (US promo)

1. "Cross That Bridge" (NY Mix) - 3:38
2. "Cross That Bridge" (NY Mix) - 3:38

12" single

1. "Cross That Bridge" (12 Mix) - 6:55
2. "Cross That Bridge" (Dub Mix) - 7:25

12" single (US promo)

1. "Cross That Bridge" (Kitchen Sink Mix) - 6:55
2. "Cross That Bridge" (NY Mix) - 3:38

CD single

1. "Cross That Bridge" (7" Version) - 3:47
2. "Cross That Bridge" (12" Version) - 6:55
3. "Cross That Bridge" (Instrumental) - 4:16
4. "Easy Prey" (Cloth Cap Mix) - 6:12

== Personnel ==
The Ward Brothers

- Dave Ward - lead vocals, backing vocals, drums, arranger
- Derek Ward - keyboards, arranger
- Graham Ward - guitar, backing vocals, arranger

Additional musicians

- Martin Bullard - synth bass, keyboards

Production

- Don Was - producer of "Cross That Bridge" and "NY Mix"
- Phil Brown - producer of "Cross That Bridge", engineer, mix engineer on "Kitchen Sink Mix"
- Frank Filipetti - producer on "NY Mix"
- Mike Howlett - producer of "Easy Prey"

Other

- The Design Clinic - sleeve design

== Charts ==
Chart (1986)	Peak position
Belgian Singles Chart (V)	32
Dutch Singles Chart	32
UK Singles Chart	32
US Billboard Hot Dance Club Play	32
