= Temptation (Joan Armatrading song) =

1985 single by Joan Armatrading

Single by Joan Armatrading

from the album Secret Secrets
- B-side: "Talking to the Wall"
- Released: 18 February 1985
- Length: 4:03 (album version); 3:45 (single version)
- Label: A&M
- Songwriter: Joan Armatrading
- Producer: Mike Howlett

Joan Armatrading singles chronology
"Frustration" (1983)	"Temptation" (1985)	"Thinking Man" (1985)

Audio
- "Temptation" on YouTube

"Temptation" is a song by English singer-songwriter Joan Armatrading, released on 18 February 1985 by A&M Records as the lead single from her ninth studio album, Secret Secrets (1985). The song, which was written by Armatrading and produced by Mike Howlett, reached number 65 in the UK singles chart.

== Music video ==
In the US, the song's accompanying music video achieved light rotation on MTV.

== Critical reception ==
Upon its release as a single, Martin Townsend of Number One noted that Armatrading has "spanned a multitude of styles since her brilliant top ten hit 'Love and Affection' in 1976 and 'Temptation' is the result: a simple, straightforward tune that bursts across a big wide and exhilarating panorama." Paul Massey of Aberdeen Evening Express considered it to be a "bouncy, catchy number that shows off Armatrading's voice to its full range". He added, "The arrangement is not as heavy as on some of her previous singles, and it helps. Good commercial pop." Hazell Dean, as guest reviewer for Record Mirror, praised Armatrading as being "in the same league as greats like Joni Mitchell, Janis Ian and Carole King". She continued, "['Temptation' is] not one of my favourite Joan Armatrading tracks but it's growing with every play". Chuck Morris of The Northern Echo remarked that the "brash production could swamp a lesser song, but it only enhances a single that demonstrates Joan's masterly musical craftsmanship".

Paul Benbow of the Reading Evening Post noted the "boppy and commercial sound" and added that, while it was "probably the best plug for a new album", it did not show Armatrading "at her best". Frank Edmonds of the Bury Free Press awarded the song a 7 out of 10 rating and wrote, "Stirring and rousing (i.e. noisy) song, liberally dosed with blasts of brass. Very agreeable, but it doesn't somehow threaten to set the entire world and all its contents alight." Mark O'Callaghan of the Worcester News called the single a "disappointment" and concluded, "This isn't a bad song, it's just very ordinary, and to make up for the lack of quality all the stops have been pulled out in the production department. But all the horns, drums and whining guitars manage to do is create confusion rather than excitement." In the US, Billboard stated that the "elliptical rock tune avoids resolving itself in hooks".

== Track listings ==
7–inch single (UK, Europe, South Africa, US and Australasia)

1. "Temptation" – 3:45
2. "Talking to the Wall" – 4:31

12-inch single (UK, Europe and Australia)

1. "Temptation" – 4:03
2. "Spanking Brand New" – 4:18
3. "Talking to the Wall" – 4:31

== Personnel ==
- Joan Armatrading – vocals (all tracks), acoustic guitar ("Temptation", "Spanking Brand New")
- David Rhodes – guitar (all tracks)
- Nick Plytas – keyboards ("Temptation", "Spanking Brand New")
- Adrian Lee – synthesiser ("Temptation", "Spanking Brand New")
- David Bitelli – saxophone (all tracks)
- Paul Spong – trumpet (all tracks), flugelhorn ("Talking to the Wall")
- Steve Sidwell – trumpet (all tracks), flugelhorn ("Talking to the Wall")
- Rick Taylor – trombone (all tracks)
- Pino Palladino – bass (all tracks)
- Mel Gaynor – drums (all tracks), congas ("Talking to the Wall")
- Alan Limbrick – guitar solo ("Spanking Brand New")
- Joe Jackson – keyboards ("Talking to the Wall")
- Raul D'Oliveira – flugelhorn lead ("Talking to the Wall")

Production

- Mike Howlett – production
- Bryan New – engineering
- Jon Hallett – engineering assistance
- Steve McLaughlin – engineering assistance

Other

- Robert Mapplethorpe – photography

== Charts ==
Chart (1985)	Peak position
Australia (Kent Music Report)	72
UK Singles (OCC)	65
