= Thinking Man =

1985 single by Joan Armatrading

Single by Joan Armatrading

from the album Secret Secrets
- B-side: "Love Grows"
- Released: 13 May 1985
- Length: 4:05
- Label: A&M
- Songwriter: Joan Armatrading
- Producer: Mike Howlett

Joan Armatrading singles chronology
"Temptation" (1985)	"Thinking Man" (1985)	"Love by You" (1985)

Audio
- "Thinking Man" on YouTube

"Thinking Man" is a song by English singer-songwriter Joan Armatrading, released on 13 May 1985 by A&M Records as the second single from her ninth studio album, Secret Secrets (1985). The song, which was written by Armatrading and produced by Mike Howlett, reached number 97 on the Australian Kent Music Report chart.

== Release ==
"Thinking Man" was released as a single in the UK on 13 May 1985. It failed to reach the top 100 of the UK singles chart, but did gain airplay on BBC Radio 1 and across Independent Local Radio.

== Critical reception ==
Upon its release as a single, Tim Blott of The Northern Echo summarised, "It's got commercial clout. Bounces along, and that excellent voice is in fine form." The Fife Free Press praised it as a "superb track" and a "scrumptious single which could well chart". Martin Hindmarsh of the Lincolnshire Echo described it as a "fine piece of music" but questioned its chart potential, stating that "most Armatrading fans probably have the album already and it's unlikely to pick up music casual trade". A reviewer for the Telegraph & Argus considered the song to be "very average and very typical Joan Armatrading". He added, "If you have got the album then there is no point buying it unless you want the previously unreleased B-side."

Johnny Waller of Sounds wrote, "As stylishly cultured as ever she was, but sadly lacking the fire and ice of her earlier triumphs. An immaculate rendition of something less than an average pop song." Paul Sexton of Record Mirror was negative in his review, stating it was a "cut and dried case of going through the motions". Ro Newton made a similar assessment in her review for Number One, remarking that the song "doesn't quite match up to the memorable 'Me Myself I' and 'All the Way from America'". She concluded that "her songwriting may have dried up but the quality of her singing never will".

In the US, Cash Box said, "Armatrading's commentary on the tension between the sexes should ring true. The single will connect with [her] legion of loyal fans as well as extend the British singer's ever-widening audience." In a retrospective review of Secrets Secrets, Dave Connolly of AllMusic noted that, although it failed to chart in the US, "Thinking Man" is "as catchy as" Armatrading's 1983 hit "Drop the Pilot".

== Track listings ==
7–inch single (UK, US, South Africa and Australasia)

1. "Thinking Man" – 4:05
2. "Love Grows" – 3:44

12-inch single (UK and Australasia)

1. "Thinking Man" – 4:05
2. "Love Grows" – 3:44
3. "Drop the Pilot" – 3:40

== Personnel ==
"Thinking Man"

- Joan Armatrading – vocals, acoustic guitar
- David Rhodes – guitar
- Nick Plytas – keyboards
- Adrian Lee – synthesisers
- David Bitelli – saxophone
- Steve Sidwell – trumpet
- Paul Spong – trumpet
- Rick Taylor – trombone
- Pino Palladino – bass
- Mel Gaynor – drums

Production

- Mike Howlett – production ("Thinking Man", "Love Grows")
- Bryan New – engineering ("Thinking Man", "Love Grows")
- Jon Hallett – engineering assistance ("Thinking Man", "Love Grows")
- Steve McLaughlin – engineering assistance ("Thinking Man", "Love Grows")
- Val Garay – production ("Drop the Pilot")

Other

- Robert Mapplethorpe – front cover photography
- Paul Cox – back cover photography

== Charts ==
Chart (1985)	Peak position
Australia (Kent Music Report)	97
