= The Affair (band) =

Pop music group

- Also known as: The Gino Affair
- Genres: Pop
- Years active: 1966–1970
- Labels: Festival
- Past members: Tony Bolton; Tony Bowman; Gino Cunico; Bob Daisley; James Kelly; Derek Fitton; Bruce Maddon; Paul Wheeler; Derek Fitton; Kerrie Biddell; Mike Howlett; Rory Thomas

The Affair were a pop music group formed in 1966 as The Gino Affair. Although only moderately successful during their short career, the band is notable for the fact that several members went on to national and international success.

== History ==
They were initially led by lead singer and former child actor, Gino Cunico, and included Tony Bolton and Keith Jackman (UK) on drums, Jim Kelly on guitar and Paul Wheeler on bass. In 1967 the group's name was shortened to The Affair when Cunico left; he was replaced by Derek Fitton as lead vocalist and then by Kerrie Biddell in 1968.

In early 1968 Mike Howlett replaced Wheeler on bass guitar The following month, Rory Thomas on Hammond organ replaced Maddon. In 1969 the group entered the Hoadley's Battle of the Sounds national band competition and in August won the Vocal Group grand final. They issued their second single, "Money Can't Buy Me Love", in October. Their prize for winning Hoadley's Battle of the Sounds was a trip to London, so the group relocated there in mid-1970, some months later they disbanded and most of the members returned to Australia.

Following the breakup of The Affair, Kerrie Biddell launched a long and successful career as a solo vocalist and teacher. Jim Kelly became a sought-after session guitarist and in the late 1970s he founded the noted Australian jazz-rock-fusion band Crossfire. Paul "Sheepdog" Wheeler went on to play bass for Billy Thorpe in the very successful heavy-rock incarnation of The Aztecs from 1969 to 1973. Mike Howlett remained in the UK after the Affair broke up; he was a member of progressive rock band Gong from 1973 to 1977, followed by the short-lived group Strontium 90, which included all three future members of The Police. In the 1980s, Howlett became a sought-after record producer, with a string of notable credits for leading new wave music acts including A Flock of Seagulls (Grammy winner), Martha & The Muffins, Orchestral Manoeuvres in the Dark, Stephen Tin Tin Duffy, Gang of Four and Comsat Angels, and the album Secret Secrets for Joan Armatrading in 1985.
