= Living for You =

1988 single by Joan Armatrading

Single by Joan Armatrading

from the album The Shouting Stage
- B-side: "Innocent Request"
- Released: 15 August 1988
- Length: 4:15
- Label: A&M
- Songwriter: Joan Armatrading
- Producer: Joan Armatrading

Joan Armatrading singles chronology
"The Shouting Stage" (1988)	"Living for You" (1988)	"Stronger Love" (1988)

Music video
- "Living for You" on YouTube

"Living for You" is a song by English singer-songwriter Joan Armatrading, released on 15 August 1988 by A&M Records as the second single from her eleventh studio album, The Shouting Stage (1988). The song, which was written and produced by Armatrading, reached number 98 in the UK singles chart.

== Background ==
Armatrading wrote "Living For You" after drummer Jamie Lane suggested that she should write songs based on rhythms generated by a drum machine.

== Release ==
"Living for You" was released by A&M Records in the UK on 15 August 1988 as the second single from The Shouting Stage. It was the album's lead single in the US and gave Armatrading her only appearance on the Billboard Modern Rock Tracks chart, where it reached number 30.

== Music video ==
The song's accompanying music video was directed by Michael Geoghegan. In the US, it achieved medium rotation on VH1.

== Critical reception ==
Upon its release as a single, Marcus Hodge of the Cambridge Evening News wrote, "After a couple of dodgy efforts Joan is back to something nearing top form. Unlike the others, this has a pleasant pop feel and is typically well-sung and arranged." Simon Warner of the Halifax Evening Courier summarised, "Attractive setting for one of Armatrading's superior efforts. A good beat and some neat horn work to add colour." Jim Whiteford, writing for the Dundee Evening Telegraph, called it a "near-bouncy love song". Andrea Fenandes of the Harrow Observer noted that Armatrading had "return[ed] with her trademark of catchy adult-oriented rock" and added, "Her fans will probably love this, but it's not unusual enough to recruit any more disciples."

In the US, Tom DeSavia, writing for Cash Box, remarked that Armatrading "opts for a softer groove" with the single, which he felt would be "perfect" for adult contemporary and Quiet storm radio formats. In a 30th anniversary retrospective on the first Billboard Modern Rock Tracks chart, Larry Fitzmaurice of Stereogum described the song as a "swinging, mid-tempo devotional" with a "goes-down-easy groove" and Armatrading's "capable vocal delivery". He added that, by today's alternative pop standards, the song "more resembles something you'd hear while perusing the supermarket aisles".

== Track listings ==
7–inch single (UK and Australasia)

1. "Living for You" – 4:15
2. "Innocent Request" – 3:08

7–inch single (Europe, South Africa and US) and cassette single (US)

1. "Living for You" – 4:15
2. "I Really Must Be Going" – 4:27

12–inch and CD single (UK)

1. "Living for You" – 4:15
2. "Innocent Request" – 3:08
3. "Cool Blue Stole My Heart" – 7:12

CD single (Europe and US)

1. "Living for You" – 4:15
2. "Down to Zero" (live) – 4:30
3. "Show Some Emotion" (live) – 5:06

== Personnel ==
"Living for You"

- Joan Armatrading – vocals
- Phil Palmer – guitar
- Alan Clark – keyboards
- Guy Barker – trumpet
- Pino Palladino – bass
- Jamie Lane – drums

Production

- Joan Armatrading – production
- Henry Lewy – production ("I Really Must Be Going")
- Glyn Johns – production and engineering ("Cool Blue Stole My Heart")
- Graham Dickson – recording, mixing ("Living for You")

Other

- Andrew Catlin – photography
- David Band – illustration
- Jeremy Pearce – art direction
- Sarah Southin – design

== Charts ==
Chart (1988)	Peak position
Canada Top Singles (RPM)	89
UK Singles (Official Charts)	98
US Alternative Airplay (Billboard)	30
