= Police Academy (album) =

Studio album by Strontium 90
- Released: 29 July 1997
- Recorded: 1976–77
- Studio: Virtual Earth Studios, London NW3
- Genre: New wave, progressive rock, punk rock
- Label: Pangaea / Ark 21
- Producer: Mike Howlett

Police Academy is the only album by Strontium 90, released by Mike Howlett in 1997. This album consists of live tracks recorded at Gong's reunion concert in Paris on 28 May 1977, five studio tracks recorded in London just before the concert, and Sting's solo demo of "Every Little Thing She Does Is Magic".

The Police would later re-record "Visions of the Night" and use parts of "3 O'Clock Shit" in two of their later compositions, "Be My Girl" and "O My God".

== Track listing ==
All songs written by Mike Howlett, except where noted.

1. "Visions of the Night" (Sting)
2. "New World Blues"
3. "3 O'Clock Shit" (Live) [incorrectly listed as "3 O'Clock Shot"] (Sting)
4. "Lady of Delight"
5. "Electron Romance"
6. "Every Little Thing She Does Is Magic" (Demo) (Sting)
7. "Towers Tumbled"
8. "Electron Romance" (Live)
9. "Lady of Delight" (Live)

The Japanese release (TOCP-50242) and the 2011 reissue contain two extra tracks:

10. "New World Blues" (Live)
11. "Towers Tumbled" (Live)

== Personnel ==
Strontium 90

- Mike Howlett – lead bass (tracks 5, 7, 8, 11), lead vocals (tracks 7–11), backing vocals (tracks 2 and 4)
- Sting – bass (tracks 1, 6, 8, 11), lead vocals (tracks 1–6 and 8), backing vocals, acoustic guitar (track 2 and 6), African drum (track 6)
- Andy Summers – electric guitars
- Stewart Copeland – drums, miscellaneous percussion
