= Reveal (Fischer-Z album) =

Studio album by Fischer-Z
- Released: 1987
- Genre: New wave
- Length: 45:00
- Label: Arista
- Producer: John Watts

Fischer-Z chronology
Red Skies over Paradise (1981)	Reveal (1987)	Fish's Head (1989)

Professional ratings
Review scores
Source	Rating
AllMusic	4/5 stars

Reveal is an album by the new wave rock band Fischer-Z. In the summer of 1981 John Watts split up with his group, Fischer-Z, on the grounds that his art could not evolve within the context of the band. Prompted by the encouragement of the well-received Fischer-Z album, Red Skies Over Paradise, Watts soon embarked on a solo career, releasing his first solo album, One More Twist (1982), followed quickly by his second, The Iceberg Model (1983). Watts toured extensively and even produced a mini-album for Zulu artist Busi Mhlongo. He released an album entitled Quick Quick Slow under the name The Cry in 1984.

After touring and releasing an album every year until 1985, John Watts tried to balance his constant touring with his responsibilities of being a father of two children. Over the next few years, he began writing and recording new material with multi-talented musician Ian Porter. In 1987, John Watts again began to record material under the Fischer-Z name — but, with one twist — Watts was now the only original member of the group and it was his "musical vision". Original Fischer-Z keyboardist, Steve Skolnik, did, however, make a minor contribution to the album.

== Track listing ==
All songs written by John Watts.

1. "The Perfect Day" - 4:18
2. "Leave It to the Businessmen to Die Young" - 4:58
3. "I Can't Wait That Long" - 4:42
4. "Tallulah Tomorrow" - 4:37
5. "Realistic Man" - 3:23
6. "Fighting Back the Tears" - 4:56
7. "Big Drum" - 3:44
8. "Heartbeat" - 3:07
9. "It Takes Love" - 4:07
10. "So Far" - 4:00
11. "Marguerite" - 3:18 (appears only on CD releases)

== Charts ==
Chart (1988)	Peak position
Australian (Kent Music Report)	95

== Personnel ==
Fischer-Z

- John Watts - lead vocals, guitar
- Ian Porter - bass, keyboards, percussion programming
- Steve Kellner - drums
- Jennie Cruse - vocals
- Alan Morrison - guitar
- Denis Haines - keyboards

Additional musicians

- Pete Sinden - bass on "Fighting Back the Tears" and "Big Drum"
- Geoff Dugmore - drums on "Big Drum" and "Heartbeat"
- Tim Moore - keyboards on "Big Drum", "Heartbeat" and "It Takes Love"
- Steve Greetham - bass on "Heartbeat"
- Lorenza Johnson - backing vocals
- Judy La Rose - backing vocals on "Heartbeat" and "It Takes Love"
- The Sapphires - backing vocals on "It Takes Love"
- Marc Fox - percussion on "Heartbeat"
- Mike Benn - keyboards on "It Takes Love"
- Steve Skolnik - keyboards on "I Can't Wait That Long"
- Mickey Donnelly - saxophone on "So Far"

Technical

- Kenny Jones, Richard Manwaring, Steve Forward - engineer
- Gary Goodman - cover design, artwork

== Notes ==
The album features the singles, "Big Drum" and "The Perfect Day", the latter being one of the most successful singles by Fischer-Z and another single to have a video made for it.

Perfect Day peaked at number 12 on the Australian Charts in 1988.
