= The Shouting Stage (song) =

1988 single by Joan Armatrading

Single by Joan Armatrading

from the album The Shouting Stage
- B-side: "I Really Must Be Going"
- Released: 18 July 1988
- Length: 5:27 (album version); 4:31 (single edit)
- Label: A&M
- Songwriter: Joan Armatrading
- Producer: Joan Armatrading

Joan Armatrading singles chronology
"Angel Man" (1986)	"The Shouting Stage" (1988)	"Living for You" (1988)

Music video
- "The Shouting Stage" on YouTube

"The Shouting Stage" is a song by English singer-songwriter Joan Armatrading, released on 18 July 1988 by A&M Records as the lead single from her eleventh studio album, The Shouting Stage (1988). The song, which was written and produced by Armatrading, reached number 89 in the UK singles chart.

== Background ==
"The Shouting Stage" was inspired by a magazine article that Armatrading had read about relationships. She told The New York Times in 1988, "The article said that sooner or later every couple reaches a point called the shouting stage where they argue and might even come to blows. I found it interesting enough to write a song about it." She added in an interview with the Oakland Tribune, "When people get to that point, all sorts of roads could be taken, from violence to not being able to handle it and walking out, to working it out and making up." Armatrading also drew on recollections of a heated argument between a couple that she witnessed in an Australian restaurant.

== Critical reception ==
Upon its release as a single, Andrew Hirst of the Huddersfield Daily Examiner praised "The Shouting Stage" as "one of the best singles of 1988" and stated, "This country's most talented songstress has reached a new peak with this haunting ballad about pain and suffering. A breathtaking slice of sheer class." Richard Jones of the Bristol Evening Post picked it as the newspaper's "single of the week". He described it as a "beautifully simple song relying on the mood of voice and guitar to create a depth of feeling" and a "slow powerful number tinged with sadness". Barry Young of the Aberdeen Press and Journal awarded it a four out of five star rating and wrote, "A deep bass, rich and stylish lyrics and spare, efficient arrangement make this a track as good as any she's done."

Michael O'Donnell of the Londonderry Sentinel considered it to be "quite a good effort from Joan" and "the best she has done in a few years". He added, "She has not been in the limelight a lot recently and this could affect the song's commercial chances but it deserves to go high." Simon Warner of the Halifax Evening Courier was more mixed in his review, noting, "Her name oft-raised in connection with soundalike Tracey Chapman, Joan comes back with an atmospheric if rather slight response." In the US, Billboard described it as a "subdued slow number that should not only stir up emotions but get airplay as well".

== Track listings ==
7–inch single (UK, US, South Africa and Australasia)

1. "The Shouting Stage" – 4:31
2. "I Really Must Be Going" – 4:32

10–inch single (UK)

1. "The Shouting Stage" – 4:31
2. "The Shouting Stage" (full length version) – 5:27

12–inch single (UK)

1. "The Shouting Stage" – 4:31
2. "I Really Must Be Going" – 4:32
3. "He Wants Her" – 3:19

CD single (UK)

1. "The Shouting Stage" – 5:00
2. "I Really Must Be Going" – 4:32
3. "He Wants Her" – 3:19
4. "The Shouting Stage" – 5:27

== Personnel ==
"The Shouting Stage"

- Joan Armatrading – vocals
- Mark Knopfler – guitar
- Bob Noble – keyboards
- Pino Palladino – bass
- Dave Mattacks – drums
- Jody Linscott – percussion

Production

- Joan Armatrading – production (all tracks)
- Henry Lewy – production ("I Really Must Be Going", "He Wants Her")
- Graham Dickson – recording, mixing ("The Shouting Stage")

Other

- Andrew Catlin – photography
- David Band – illustration
- Jeremy Pearce – art direction
- Sarah Southin – design

== Charts ==
Chart (1988)	Peak position
UK Singles (OCC)	89
