= Sleight of Hand (album) =

Studio album by Joan Armatrading
- Released: 12 May 1986
- Studio: Bumpkin
- Genre: Pop rock
- Length: 40:28
- Label: A&M
- Producer: Joan Armatrading

Joan Armatrading chronology
Secret Secrets (1985)	Sleight of Hand (1986)	The Shouting Stage (1988)

Singles from Sleight of Hand
- 1. "Kind Words (And a Real Good Heart)" Released: 21 April 1986; 2. "Reach Out" Released: 14 July 1986; 3. "Jesse" Released: 1986

Sleight of Hand is the tenth studio album by the British singer-songwriter Joan Armatrading, released on 12 May 1986 by A&M Records. It was recorded and produced by Armatrading at Bumpkin Studio, her own purpose built studio in the grounds of her home. The album peaked at No. 34 on the UK Album Charts, No. 70 on the US Billboard 200, and No. 39 in Australia. It was certified Silver by the British Phonographic Industry for sales in excess of 60,000 copies.

== Background ==
Armatrading began work on the album in November 1985, following the release of her previous studio album Secret Secrets in February of that year. She had planned for some time to produce her own albums and had gradually assumed control of many aspects of recording and production. However, when approaching the project of producing her very first album, she was nervous about the possibility of her record label, A&M, refusing to release the album (A&M had initially refused to release her eighth studio album The Key (1983) on the grounds that it was not commercial enough, and had asked Armatrading to write some additional, more commercial material).

To deal with this possibility, Armatrading decided to have a dry run, and record and produce samples that would eventually become Sleight of Hand. To do this, she asked bass guitarist Steve Greetham and keyboardist Alex White, who toured with her following the release of Secret Secrets, to come to her studio and record songs for her new album. This was unusual for Armatrading as she normally kept her studio and touring bands separate, using different musicians – on this occasion she wanted musicians around her that she knew and felt comfortable with, and who would be supportive during her first attempt at production. They drafted in drummer Geoff Dugmore with the plan that the three musicians, plus Armatrading playing all guitars, would record some songs – with Armatrading also producing, to see how it went. Steve Greetham noted at the time that it was "very unusual" for Armatrading to ask members of her touring band to record with her, but said he and Alex White "were very pleased to be able to do it".

Armatrading had already recorded some demos on her own, with a drum machine, guitar and keyboards; and during November and December 1985 the quartet recorded some songs based on those. Armatrading then decided her recording equipment "wasn't good enough" and had it upgraded with a 24-track tape machine and better musical instruments. From January 1986, she drafted in Mark Wallis to engineer the new album and she and the band re-recorded, calling in session musicians to do some overdubs, and asking guitarist Eddie Golga to play on one track – "Laurel and the Rose". Armatrading recorded her vocals in seclusion, as she had done since the album Back to the Night (1975), being too shy to record in front of other people. After the recordings were complete, she asked Steve Lillywhite, who had produced Walk Under Ladders (1981) and The Key (1983), to do the mixing.

In a 1986 interview, Armatrading said that she considered it to be one of her best albums and that it was "an overall rock album as opposed to a jazz song here and another bit there. It's a complete album in terms of sound and songs."

== Songs ==
Cover of the single "Jesse" released from the album

Armatrading gave an interview to Tracks magazine in June 1986 in which she explained the background and thoughts to the various songs on the album.

"Reach Out" was released as a single. It is a Motown referenced song, referring back to the Four Tops' 1967 hit single "Reach Out I'll Be There" and their album Reach Out.

The idea for "Angel Man" came from a film script Armatrading was sent and also from the fact that her younger brother, the actor Tony Armatrading, had appeared in the TV series Angels.

"One More Chance" carries overtones of Prince's album 1999.

"Jesse" is also based on a film script, though in an interview in 1988 with broadcaster Paul Gambaccini, Armatrading stated that she came to "hate" the song. The song was also released as a single, with its B-side "The River's on Fire" – not available on the album.

"Don Juan" was Armatrading's favourite track because it is "romantic ... a nice, soppy love song ... and I like that."

"Kind Words (And a Real Good Heart)" was released as a single in May 1986 but entered the UK Singles Chart for just one week, peaking at No. 81. It also reached No. 37 on the US Billboard Mainstream Rock chart.

== Critical reception ==
Professional ratings
Review scores
Source	Rating
AllMusic	3/5 stars
The Encyclopedia of Popular Music	3/5 stars
Sounds	3 5/8 out of 5

In a contemporary review for the Los Angeles Times, critic Steve Hochman wrote that the album conveyed a "tough, vulnerable stance" through its melodies, rhythms and lyrics, and said that Armatrading had "found the best producer for her distinctive work: Joan Armatrading".

In a retrospective review for AllMusic, critic Dave Connolly referred to Sleight of Hand as "a well crafted album [with] uncluttered production [and] expressiveness and energy", singling out the tracks "Russian Roulette", "Don Juan" and "Laurel and the Rose" for special mention.

Hugh Fielder of Sounds noted that, in contrast to much of Armatrading's earlier work, Sleight of Hand has "all the subtlety of a sledgehammer as it weaves somewhere between Pat Benatar and Streets of Fire". He believed the result was both a "break from the predictability of the last few albums" and a clear attempt to "break into the American market", with Armatrading sounding "fully committed [rather than] uncomfortable in these surroundings as you might expect". He singled out "One More Chance" as her "most stunning song" since "Love and Affection".

Bass player Steve Greetham noted later that "[Armatrading's] acoustic guitar is amazing – absolutely amazing", and gave the opinion that if she focused on that instead of electric guitars and other instruments, she'd sell "a bucket-load". In this he echoed the sentiments of Mike Howlett, who had produced Secret Secrets.

== Tour and aftermath ==
Bassist Steve Greetham and drummer Geoff Dugmore, who played on the album, were invited to tour with Armatrading, but declined. Geoff Dugmore had other work projects and Steve Greetham "couldn't face another six months on the road.". Armatrading felt let down that the pair declined to tour with her. The tour ended badly for Armatrading when she collapsed with exhaustion after coming off stage, and she couldn't complete the tour – many of the American concerts were cancelled as were the Australian ones.

The feeling at the time was, according to Greetham, that Armatrading had reached a low point, she'd been pushing herself too hard and her albums weren't selling as well as they used to. She decided to take a year off and planned in future to cut her touring down.

During her year off Armatrading stayed away from "anything to do with music". She bought a stud farm near Hindhead in Surrey as a business venture in case she could no longer make a living from music and spent the rest of her time in the garden, or sleeping and watching TV. She said: "I didn't play my guitar, I didn't write, didn't listen to much music or anything."

== Track listing ==
All songs written and arranged by Joan Armatrading.

Side one

1. "Kind Words (And a Real Good Heart)" – 3:46
2. "Killing Time" – 3:54
3. "Reach Out" – 4:15
4. "Angel Man" – 3:41
5. "Laurel and the Rose" – 3:46

Side two

6. "One More Chance" – 5:14
7. "Russian Roulette" – 4:33
8. "Jesse" – 3:26
9. "Figure of Speech" – 3:25
10. "Don Juan" – 5:14

== Personnel ==
Credits are adapted from the Sleight of Hand liner notes.

Musicians

- Joan Armatrading – vocals; acoustic and electric guitars; harmonica
- Alex White – keyboards
- Eddie Golga – guitar (on "Laurel and the Rose")
- Steve Greetham – bass guitar; backing vocals
- Geoff Dugmore – drums
- Mel Gaynor – drums (on "Kind Words (And a Real Good Heart))"
- Ray Cooper – percussion (on "Kind Words (And a Real Good Heart)" and "Figure of Speech")
- Wesley Magoogan – saxophone
- Jim Ross – backing vocals

Production and artwork

- Joan Armatrading – producer
- Mark Wallis – engineer
- Steve Lillywhite – mixing
- Snowdon – photography

== Charts ==
Chart	Peak position
Australian Albums (ARIA)	39
New Zealand Albums (RMNZ)	42
UK Albums (Official Charts)	34
US Billboard 200	70
