= Secret Secrets =

Studio album by Joan Armatrading
- Released: 4 February 1985
- Studio: Battery, London
- Genre: Pop
- Length: 41:07
- Label: A&M
- Producer: Mike Howlett

Joan Armatrading chronology
Track Record (1983)	Secret Secrets (1985)	Sleight of Hand (1986)

Secret Secrets is the ninth studio album by British singer-songwriter Joan Armatrading, released on 4 February 1985 by A&M (AMA 5040). The album was recorded and mixed at Battery Studios (previously known as Morgan Studios), in Willesden, London. It reached number 14 on the UK Album Chart and was certified Silver by the British Phonographic Industry for sales in excess of 60,000 copies. The album peaked at number 18 in Australia. The album had little success with singles, with its only charting hit, "Temptation", stalling at no.65 on the UK Singles Chart.

== Background ==
The producer for Secret Secrets was Mike Howlett, who had previous success producing for bands such as OMD, China Crisis and Berlin. Alex Sadkin, who had produced three albums with Grace Jones, was approached but he was not available at the time. Secret Secrets was the last album for which Armatrading worked with a producer as she has produced all subsequent albums herself. At the time of this album's release, Armatrading was having her own studio built in the grounds of her home, and she eventually named it Bumpkin Studio.

Armatrading arranged all the songs on this album herself, since during this time she was increasingly taking control of most aspects of her music. Howlett felt that Armatrading did not in fact really need a producer, except in the area of recording vocals, as this was "always a difficult process to do oneself".

In The Faber Companion to 20th Century Popular Music, Phil Hardy and Dave Laing commented that the album showed "a stronger rock influence" than many of her previous ones, particularly on tracks like "Persona Grata", and this is unsurprising given the involvement of Howlett. Originally, Howlett had wanted Armatrading "to head much more back towards Joan Armatrading – her third studio album and a much more blues and folk influenced one, and an album which he described as his "favourite". The musicians for Secret Secrets were chosen by Armatrading and Howlett, and the idea to have a brass section on the album came from Joe Jackson, another A&M artist who was brought in to play on the track "Love by You".

The album's photography was done by "celebrated New York photographer" Robert Mapplethorpe and shows Armatrading wearing a dress for the first time on any of her record covers. Allmusic's Dave Connolly notes that using Mapplethorpe for the cover photograph "took some guts on Armatrading's part".

== The songs ==
According to Armatrading's unofficial biographer Sean Mayes, "Persona Grata" is reminiscent of "some of the rock epics of the Seventies" – a big, melodic and fully orchestrated song, showcasing Armatrading's vocals.

"Temptation" (released in February 1985) and "Thinking Man" (released in May 1985) came out as singles but did not reach the Top 40, though in the opinion of Allmusic's Dave Connolly they are "as catchy as "Drop the Pilot" her Top 20 hit from her previous album The Key.

"Moves" features a rare piece of blues harmonica playing from Armatrading.

"Talking to the Wall" is a jazz influenced song, and Armatrading said of it: "I wanted to create something romantic … that you can close your eyes to and just listen."

The ballad "Love by You" featured piano by Joe Jackson, as Armatrading chose not to play piano herself on this album.

The songs "One Night" and "Strange" are slow-tempo ballads, "Strange" being described by Dave Connolly as "luminous".

The title song "Secret Secrets" has influences of punk and Armatrading admitted to her biographer Sean Mayes that the song was about her.

== Reception ==
Professional ratings
Review scores
Source	Rating
AllMusic	3/5 stars
The Encyclopedia of Popular Music	3/5 stars

The album was a commercial success for Armatrading – making it to number 14 in the UK album chart and number 73 in the US, though it produced no hit singles. Some critics praised many of the songs featured on the album but were of the opinion that the album as a whole marked a slight downturn from Armatrading's previous work, citing "over-production" as one of the reasons.

Dave Connolly of AllMusic described the album as "very good … [and] … more mature and upbeat".

Eleanor Levy, in a 1985 review for Record Mirror, noted that the album's lyrics "touch on the deep emotional nerve we all have hiding away", that Secret Secrets is "a cleanly produced, lovingly created album" and that Armatrading "sings like she means it".

Hugh Fielder, in a 1985 review for Sounds, referred to the album as " a consummate, sensitive offering" and noted that there were "moments when the piercing shafts of lyrical insight make you shiver with discomfort". He singled out the "mature anguish" of the ballads "One Night" and "Love By You" for particular mention, noting that Armatrading's lyrics "still burn".

== Tour ==
While making the album, Armatrading and Howlett auditioned musicians for the tour. The eventual line-up was Steve Greetham (bass), Les Davison (guitar), Alex White (keyboards), Jim Ross (saxophone, guitar and vocals), Ted Emmett (trumpet) and Marc Parnell (drums). Armatrading and her band appeared on Into the Music on both BBC2 and Radio 1 on 4 April 1985, performing songs from the album.

Armatrading and her band toured for three weeks in the UK, beginning on 10 February 1985 and appearing at Hammersmith Odeon from 1 to 6 March. The European tour began on 9 March and lasted a month. The US tour began on 1 May and included two sold-out nights at Radio City Music Hall and concerts at Red Rocks Amphitheatre and the Ritz. The band then toured Australia for three weeks, commencing 7 June, and ended in Sydney, Australia, where Armatrading performed for six nights at the Sydney Entertainment Centre and was given the key to the city. One of the shows was filmed and televised on BBC TV on 3 August 1985. In 1990 Australia was described as "Joan's favourite country, and one where she is adored". In September 1985 the band did a one-off live, open-air concert in Tel Aviv. Armatrading and the band had been asked to perform at the 1985 Live Aid concert but had been double-booked and so could not do it.

Steve Greetham commented in 1990: "some of the shows I did with Joan were among the best shows I've ever done with anybody in my whole life", citing the concerts at Red Rocks and Tel Aviv as "really memorable".

== Track listing ==
All songs written and arranged by Joan Armatrading.

=== Side 1 ===
1. "Persona Grata" – 4:44
2. "Temptation" – 4:03
3. "Moves" – 4:12
4. "Talking to the Wall" – 4:31
5. "Love by You" – 3:13

=== Side 2 ===
1. "Thinking Man" – 4:05
2. "Friends Not Lovers" – 4:00
3. "One Night" – 4:59
4. "Secret Secrets" – 3:28
5. "Strange" – 3:52

== Personnel ==
=== Musicians ===
- Joan Armatrading – vocals, acoustic guitar, harmonica
- David Rhodes – acoustic and electric guitar
- Alan Murphy – rhythm guitar
- Pino Palladino – bass guitar
- Joe Jackson – piano
- Nick Plytas – keyboards, synthesizers
- Adrian Lee – synthesizers
- David Bitelli – saxophone
- Wesley Magoogan – saxophone
- Steve Sidwell – trumpet, flugelhorn
- Paul Spong – trumpet
- Rick Taylor – trombone
- Raul D'Oliveira – flugelhorn lead
- Mel Gaynor – drums & timpani

=== Production Team ===
- Producer: Mike Howlett
- Engineer: Bryan "Chuck" New
- Assistant Engineers: Jon Hallett & Stephen McLaughlin
- Strings and horns arranged by Joan Armatrading
- Strings orchestrated by Fiachra Trench
- Horns scored by Dave Bitelli
- Art Direction: Michael Ross
- Design: Moira Bogue
- Photography: Robert Mapplethorpe
- Co-ordination & assistance: Tessa Pacey
- Sales Representative: Mike Noble
- Food: Rebecca
- Management: Running Dog Management Ltd
