= Word Salad (album) =

Studio album by Fischer-Z
- Released: 4 May 1979
- Studio: Eden Studios, Chiswick, London; Wessex Sound Studios, Highbury, London
- Genre: New wave
- Length: 37:00
- Label: United Artists
- Producer: Mike Howlett

Fischer-Z chronology
| Word Salad (1979) | Going Deaf for a Living (1980) |

Professional ratings
Review scores
| Source | Rating |
|---|---|
| Allmusic | 3/5 stars |
| Smash Hits | (favourable) |

Word Salad is a 1979 debut album by Fischer-Z. John Watts and Steve Skolnik formed the band in 1976 whilst at Brunel University. John Watts had been travelling up and down the country playing the club circuit. Fischer-Z was playing a crossover of the new wave, punk and reggae genres. In 1978, the band secured a record deal with United Artists, alongside the Buzzcocks, The Stranglers and Dr. Feelgood.

== Track listing ==
All tracks composed by John Watts; except where noted.

1. "Pretty Paracetamol" (also known as: "First Impressions", but this name doesn't usually feature on the CD releases) – 3:57
2. "Acrobats" (Watts, David Graham) – 2:42
3. "The Worker" – 3:36
4. "Spiders" (Watts, Steve Skolnik) – 1:42
5. "Remember Russia" – 3:29
6. "The French Let Her" (Watts, Steve Skolnik) – 3:21
7. "Lies" – 3:57
8. "Wax Dolls" – 2:46
9. "Headlines" – 3:21
10. "Nice to Know" – 2:52
11. "Billy and the Motorway Police" (Watts, David Graham) – 2:11
12. "Lemmings" (Watts, Steve Skolnik) – 3:02

== Personnel ==
Fischer-Z

- John Watts - lead vocals, guitar
- Steve Skolnik - keyboards, vocals
- David Graham - bass guitar
- Steve Liddle - drums, percussion

Technical

- Gary Edwards, Aldo Bocca - recording engineer
- John Pasche - art direction, design
- John Wedge - photography

== Notes ==
- The songs "Wax Dolls", "Remember Russia", "The Worker" and "Pretty Paracetamol" (although named on single release as "First Impressions") were used as singles. "The Worker" being the most successful, hitting #53 on the UK charts (Note: The 7" single version of "The Worker" is slightly remixed from the album and emphasises the keyboards. This version has yet to appear on CD to date).
- The album was first released on CD in 1989. In 1997 "Disky Communications Europe" re-released the album under the title "The Worker". It included two bonus tracks: "Limbo" and "Marliese"; the first appearing on Fischer-Z's second album Going Deaf For A Living, and the latter appearing on their third, Red Skies Over Paradise. In 2005, Disky re-released this version again, this time simply going by the title "Fischer-Z".
