= Ether (Fischer-Z album) =

Studio album by Fischer-Z
- Released: 2002
- Genre: Big beat, pop, rock
- Length: 59:00
- Label: PIAS
- Producer: John Watts

Fischer-Z chronology
Stream (1995)	Ether (2002)

Professional ratings
Review scores
Source	Rating
AllMusic	4/5 stars

Ether was an experimental music project by John Watts, released under the name Fischer-Z. After releasing two successful solo albums and one album of remixes, since the last Fischer-Z album, Stream, John Watts had started to take an interest in creating big beat music. After creating a whole big beat style album in 1999 entitled Bigbeatpoetry, Watts carried on in a similar style for Ether. He recorded a number of songs, featuring only his guitar and voice, and then put them over cut-up beats as a rhythm track. Watts had also added a filmic touch to the project, he travelled throughout Europe and post-9/11 New York City to find musicians at random and record them using his laptop, in their homes and on the street. Sarah Vermeersch filmed & edited the process into a road movie. Ether was further released as a John Watts solo album (see: Ether Music & Film), including the road movie DVD and a CD of tracks from the Ether album that appeared in the movie.

== Track listing ==
1. "Ether"
2. "Jukebox"
3. "Supernatural"
4. "Famous"
5. "Glorious"
6. "Beep"
7. "Eclipse"
8. "Amnesty"
9. "Promenaders"
10. "Fury"
11. "Home"
12. "Plummeting"
13. "Anything"
14. "Over"
15. "Valley"
16. "Only"

== Personnel (as credited on CD) ==
- John Watts - vocals, guitars, keyboards, plus
- Tristan Banks - drums, programming, percussion & laid-back enthusiasm, Queen's Park
- Pete Sinden - bass & stability, Flat 5. Brighton
- Graham Bonnett - "Mr. Soundgood", Brighton & Saffron Walden
- Felix Gauder - "Jukebox" production, Daylight Studios, Stuttgart.
- Jens Krause - "Eclipse" production, wise words & warmth, Hanover.
- Christof Stein-Schneider - rock 'n' roll guitar, Hanover.
- Danny Dziuk - Hammond from the tower, Berlin.
- Hans Rohe - slide guitar, atmospherics, Berlin.
- Moe Jaksch - stand-up bass, Berlin.
- Rausch - sex & drugs & rock climbing, Koln.
- Phil Evans - devil's advocate production, clapping, keyboards, vocals on Greenpeace Roof, Antwerp & Brussels
- Raoul Del Campo - accordion & cajon, Korte Achterom, Antwerp
- Nikko Weidemann - organ, guitar & bonhomie, NYC
- The 3 Rappers - rhymes in Times Square, Manhattan
- Scott Allen - the funk cello, Blue Beach, Nice
- Lucie, Emillie & Leila Watts - vocals, Flat 5, Brighton.
- Ben Stobart - ragga, alto saxophone, Barcelona.
- Rupert Cobb - muted trumpet, Flat 5, Brighton & trumpet at Rupe's Place
- Dan Rehahn - fruity trombone
- Kerry Wilson - tenor saxophone
- Rob Reed - purple alto saxophone at Rupe's Place
- Steve Cropper - electric guitar, The Grand Hotel, Amsterdam
