= Kind Words (And a Real Good Heart) =

Single by Joan Armatrading

from the album Sleight of Hand
- Released: 21 April 1986
- Studio: Bumpkin Studios
- Genre: Pop rock
- Length: 3:46
- Label: A&M
- Songwriter: Joan Armatrading
- Producer: Joan Armatrading

Joan Armatrading singles chronology
"Love by You" (1985)	"Kind Words (And a Real Good Heart)" (1986)	"Reach Out" (1986)

Music video
- "Kind Words (And a Real Good Heart)" on YouTube

"Kind Words (And a Real Good Heart)" is a song written and recorded by the British singer-songwriter Joan Armatrading, released on 21 April 1986 as the lead single from her tenth studio album, Sleight of Hand (1986). The single entered the UK singles chart for just one week, peaking at No. 81. It also reached No. 37 on the US Billboard Mainstream Rock chart.

== Background ==
In a 1986 interview with the Dallas Times Herald, Armatrading said about the song, "[It's] a bit of observation – quite a bit of what happened to me – which addresses people who appear to be trustworthy or at least tell you they are, and aren't. They tell you they're looking out for you, and they turn out not to be very nice people at all."

== Music video ==
The song's accompanying music video was directed by Steve Barron. In the US, it achieved breakout rotation on MTV.

== Critical reception ==
Upon its release, Jim Whiteford of the Dundee Evening Telegraph wrote, "Set on a thumping bass line, this up-tempo throbber should restore Joan to the top twenty pretty quickly... it'll also bring her great success in clubland. A hot production, with her distinctive vocal work adding that extra touch of class." Alan Poole of the Northamptonshire Evening Telegraph stated, "Any Armatrading is good Armatrading, but this is the best – a lively, funky feel with Steve Lillywhite's mix ensuring a minimum of distractions from the lady's splendid voice." A reviewer for the Huddersfield Daily Examiner described the song as being "Joan almost at her cynical and economic best". They added that it "deserves to be a hit, but probably won't be". Chris Eary of the Reading Evening Post summarised, "A change of mood for the lady who exercises her tonsils over a rocky backing. Good stuff." A reviewer for the Newark Advertiser noted that Armatrading "sounds butch on this ditty, achieved mainly because the backing is so raucous". They continued, "Heavy drums and a bull-frog-base predominate. Synthesizers are there, too, but their contributions are minimal in the mainstream. They do feature more strongly in the breaks."

Simon Schofield, writing for the Yorkshire Evening Press, commented on the "familiar Armatrading musical ground" and noted that it "meanders quite sweetly but takes a long time to get not very far". The Greenock Telegraph considered it to be a "predictable slice of paranoia from the archetypal unlucky-in-love lady", but noted the "rockier backbeat than usual". David Alpin of the Halifax Evening Courier called it "enthusiastic but average". The Lancashire Evening Telegraph felt it was "forgettable" and a "most disappointing release from an occasionaly brilliant artist", with a "poor" chart chance. Roger Holland of Sounds was negative in his review, writing, "A voice shaped for slight perfections and quiet observations hurls itself to the dogs in some kamikaze plunge for chart action. A big booming sound, fake funk and a pointlessly brutal guitar-rending. Whatever happened to delicacy?"

== Track listing ==
7-inch single (UK, Europe, US, Canada, Australasia, South Africa and Japan)

1. "Kind Words (And a Real Good Heart)" – 3:50
2. "Figure of Speech" – 3:28

12-inch single (UK, Europe, US and Australasia)

1. "Kind Words (And a Real Good Heart)" (extended mix) – 6:45
2. "Kind Words (And a Real Good Heart)" – 3:50
3. "Figure of Speech" – 3:28

== Personnel ==
- Joan Armatrading – lead vocals, electric guitar
- Alex White – keyboards
- Steve Greetham – bass guitar, backing vocals
- Mel Gaynor – drums ("Kind Words")
- Geoff Dugmore – drums ("Figure of Speech"), backing vocals
- Ray Cooper – percussion
- Jim Ross – backing vocals

Production

- Joan Armatrading – production
- Steve Lillywhite – mixing

Other

- Iain McKell – photography

== Charts ==
Chart	Position
Australia (Kent Music Report)	99
UK Singles (Official Charts)	81
US Mainstream Rock (Billboard)	37
