= The Shouting Stage =

Studio album by Joan Armatrading
- Released: 29 June 1988
- Recorded: Bumpkin
- Genre: Pop
- Length: 43:50
- Label: A&M
- Producer: Joan Armatrading

Joan Armatrading chronology
Sleight of Hand (1986)	The Shouting Stage (1988)	Hearts and Flowers (1990)

The Shouting Stage is the 11th studio album by the British singer-songwriter Joan Armatrading, released on 29 June 1988 by A&M Records. It was written, arranged, and produced entirely by Armatrading herself, and recorded at her home studio (Bumpkin), with mixing done at Olympic Studios, London.

== Background ==
Several of the musicians on the album – Phil Palmer on guitar, Wesley Magoogan on saxophone, Dave Mattacks and Jamie Lane on drums and Pino Palladino on bass – are stalwarts from previous Armatrading albums, though as is usual with Armatrading, the album also features a number of new musicians, including Dire Straits guitarist Mark Knopfler guesting on two of the tracks, Dire Straits keyboardist and pianist Alan Clark guesting on a further two, and drummer Mark Brzezicki of Big Country also guesting on two tracks.

Armatrading took a more relaxed approach to making this album than she had with previous ones. After her previous album, Sleight of Hand, and the tour following its release, she had collapsed with exhaustion and had taken a year away from music entirely. Her approach to making The Shouting Stage was to take much longer over the recording – she took several months over this album rather than her customary six weeks, beginning in September 1987 and not finishing the album until May 1988. The result was "a wonderful experience for all" with "a good atmosphere, friendly and relaxed", and because of the extra time taken over the recording, Armatrading had more choice over the musicians she invited to take part.

The engineer for the album was Graham Dickson, who was recommended to Armatrading by Gus Dudgeon, who had produced her first album, Whatever's for Us. For this album, like her others, Armatrading supplied demos for the songs which she had recorded herself, with guide vocals already on them, since she was reluctant as always, because of her shyness, to sing in front of other musicians. She would write out chord charts for the musicians, though these were not always easy to follow since as Phil Palmer, who played on the album observed, she often used "eccentric guitar tunings". For this album she listened to her demos more critically and tried to find ways to improve her songs. As is normal with Armatrading, her final vocals for the songs were recorded in seclusion.

Phil Palmer observed about Armatrading during the making of the album: "she's a one-off, that's the bottom line. I don't know anybody else like her. I don't ever expect to meet anyone else like her."

== The songs ==
"Living for You" grew out of a suggestion by Jamie Lane that Armatrading should write songs based on rhythms generated by a drum machine. It features Guy Barker's laid back trumpet and some synthesised steel band sounds.

"Did I Make You Up" was based around a guitar riff improvised by Mark Knopfler. Armatrading had already written the song but Knopfler felt it could be improved by including a more up-tempo riff, which he then devised and which Armatrading agreed to include on the song.

"The Devil I Know" is a song about the double standards some men have about being faithful. The song is unusual because Armatrading uses her own name in it, the only song in her catalogue where she does this.

"The Shouting Stage" was inspired by a heated argument between a couple that Armatrading witnessed in an Australian restaurant, along with an article in a London magazine she had read that said sooner or later every couple reaches a point called the shouting stage where they argue and might even come to blows. Armatrading's biographer Sean Mayes described the song as "very atmospheric and classy … with Joan's vocals casting back to Nina Simone."

"All A Woman Needs" grew out of a conversation Armatrading had with friends over dinner, with one of them relating a story about a man who gave a woman he liked anything she asked for, saying "love will come later". Armatrading felt that this message was "something to say to somebody".

For the song "Dark Truths", Armatrading told Sean Mayes: "this is one song where the music came first … thinking very much of the arrangements."

Three songs from the album ("The Shouting Stage", "Living for You" and "Stronger Love") were released as singles.

== Critical reception ==
Professional ratings
Review scores
Source	Rating
AllMusic	2/5 stars
Christgau's Record Guide	B
The Encyclopedia of Popular Music	4/5 stars

The album was critically well-received and reached number 28 in the UK album charts and number 100 in the US album charts. It was certified Silver by the BPI. As with her previous two albums, it failed to produce a genuine hit song; of the three singles drawn from the album, "Stronger Love" did not chart, "The Shouting Stage" peaked at no. 89 in the UK Singles Chart, and "Living for You" flickered into the chart for a single week at no. 98.

Steve Hochman, writing in the Los Angeles Times in August 1988, drew attention to the album's "soulful phrasing and lyrics, sturdy rhythmic sense, [and] overall sense of contentedness".

In The Virgin Encyclopedia of Popular Music, Colin Larkin referred to the album as "her most impressive album in some time", but noted that it "failed to reach the heights achieved by many of its predecessors".

AllMusic reviewer William Ruhlmann praised the "spare" sound and "tasteful" accompaniment, but said that "lyrically, Armatrading seems trapped in a romantic cul-de-sac – when she doesn't have the object of her affections, she longs for him, but when she does have him, she argues with him and suspects him of infidelity, not to mention emotional abuse".

Armatrading's unofficial biographer Sean Mayes said of the album that it was Armatrading "re-examining old preoccupations" and that it "represents not just a mellowing, but a turning away from challenge" and that overall it was "a successful exercise in jazzy soul".

== Post-release ==
Armatrading did a small amount of promotion following the release of the album, including a radio interview with broadcaster Paul Gambaccini, and then embarked on a two-month tour. Armatrading's show at the Hammersmith Odeon in September 1988 was filmed for television.

Phil Palmer, who played on the album, felt that the tour was a less than satisfying experience for Armatrading, with some shows not selling out, and put this down to "management cutting corners". He had been invited to join the tour but had declined when the record company only offered to pay half of what he wanted. He felt the band for the tour could have been much stronger had the record company agreed to recruit more experienced musicians and pay them appropriately.

== Track listing ==
All songs written and arranged by Joan Armatrading.

Side 1

1. "The Devil I Know" – 4:13
2. "Living for You" – 4:14
3. "Did I Make You Up" – 3:45
4. "Stronger Love" – 5:07
5. "The Shouting Stage" – 5:27

Side 2

1. "Words" – 3:46
2. "Innocent Request" – 3:08 (CD-only bonus track on certain issues)
3. "Straight Talk" – 4:02
4. "Watch Your Step" – 3:58
5. "All a Woman Needs" – 5:01
6. "Dark Truths" – 2:09

== Personnel ==
Musicians

- Joan Armatrading – vocals, guitar (solos: tracks A1, B2)
- Phil Palmer – guitar
- Mark Knopfler – guitar (tracks A3, A5)
- Pino Palladino – bass
- Bob Noble – keyboards (tracks A1, A3, A5, B2, B6) organ (track B3), strings (track A4, B6)
- Alan Clark – keyboards (track A2, B4), piano (track A4)
- Dave Mattacks – drums (tracks A5, B2, B5)
- Jamie Lane – drums (tracks A2, B4)
- Mark Brzezicki – drums (tracks A1, A3)
- Manu Katché – drums (tracks B1, B3)
- Wesley Magoogan – saxophone (tracks A4, B3)
- Guy Barker – trumpet (track A2)
- Jody Linscott – percussion (tracks A3, A5)
- David Rhodes – backing vocals (tracks B1, B3)

Production

- Producer: Joan Armatrading
- Engineer: Graham Dickson
- Mixed by Graham Dickson & Joan Armatrading
- Mixing Assistants: Heidi Cannavo, Noel Harris
- Mastered by: Tim Young
- Art direction: Jeremy Pearce
- Artwork: David Band
- Design: Sarah Southin
- Photography: Andrew Catlin
