= Fish's Head =

Studio album by Fischer-Z
- Released: 1 May 1989
- Genre: New wave
- Length: 44:00
- Label: Ariola
- Producer: John Watts

Fischer-Z chronology
Reveal (1987)	Fish's Head (1989)	Destination Paradise (1992)

Professional ratings
Review scores
Source	Rating
AllMusic	2/5 stars
Hi-Fi News & Record Review	A/B:1

Fish's Head was the fifth album under the name Fischer-Z, and second album by the new re-vamped Fischer-Z after being revived in 1987, despite the departure of Denis Haines and Alan Morrison from the group. This album carries on in the same style as its predecessor, Reveal. Fish's Head included the evocative "Say No" single, with a politically charged black & white Nick Brandt promo clip which was banned by Watts’ own record label on the grounds of it potentially "endangering the lives of their employees worldwide".

== Track listing ==
All songs written by John Watts.

1. "Say No" - 4:03
2. "Masquerade" - 4:48
3. "It Could Be You" - 4:58
4. "Sticky Business" - 4:04
5. "Huba" - 4:02
6. "Oh Mother" - 4:49
7. "Just Words" - 4:26
8. "It's Only a Hurricane" - 4:26
9. "She Said" - 4:09
10. "Ho Ho Ho" - 4:51

== Personnel ==
- John Watts - lead vocal, guitar
- Ian Porter - bass, keyboards
- Steve Kellner - drums
- Jennie Cruse - vocals
