= Madness of It All =

Studio album by The Ward Brothers
- Released: 13 April 1987
- Length: 66:21
- Label: Siren; A&M (US)
- Producer: Mike Howlett; Don Was; Frank Filipetti

The Ward Brothers chronology
Madness of It All (1987)	Wave Goodbye to Grandma (1994)

Madness of It All is the debut studio album from the British pop-rock band The Ward Brothers, which was released by Siren in 1987.

The album was not a commercial success, but two of its singles were UK chart entries; "Cross That Bridge" reached No. 32 in December 1986 and "Why Do You Run?" peaked at No. 81 in April 1987. In the US, "Cross That Bridge" reached No. 32 on the Billboard Hot Dance Club Play chart. The title track was featured in the Miami Vice episode "Love At First Sight".

== Critical reception ==
Professional ratings
Review scores
Source	Rating
The Philadelphia Inquirer	2/4 stars

Robin Denselow of The Guardian picked the "light and tuneful" "Cross That Bridge" as the best song on the album, adding: "The rest of the LP sounds classy but anonymous; it's full of throbbing synthesised ballads, with a little funk and even a fashionable burst of electro-heavy metal thrown in. Decidedly forgettable." Billboard noted Dave Ward's "distinctive chops", but felt the "fairly straightforward pop material has a way to go before dividends will be accrued".

Cash Box listed the album as one of their feature picks during February 1987. They described the album as an "impressive debut" with "largely crafty dance-oriented rock". Jack Lloyd of The Philadelphia Inquirer wrote: "Though the material is a bit uneven, there are a couple of above-average numbers such as "Over the Border" and "Cross That Bridge". The obvious flaw with a band like this is that what it does is fine, but what it does is not especially exciting."

== Track listing ==
All tracks are written by Graham Ward

No.	Title	Length
1.	"Why Do You Run"	5:13
2.	"Easy Prey"	4:24
3.	"I Trusted You"	3:50
4.	"Over the Border"	5:04
5.	"Shadows of You"	3:29
6.	"Don't Talk to Strangers"	6:01
7.	"Limbo"	4:22
8.	"Cross That Bridge"	4:12
9.	"Madness of It All"	4:24

CD additional tracks
No.	Title	Length
10.	"Easy Prey (Cloth Cap Mix)"	6:12
11.	"Don't Talk to Strangers (Brown Mac Mix)"	7:01
12.	"Cross That Bridge (Kitchen Sink Mix)"	6:59
13.	"Madness of It All (Instrumental)"	5:14

== Personnel ==
The Ward Brothers

- Dave Ward - lead vocals, backing vocals, drums, percussion, arranger
- Derek Ward - keyboards, programming, arranger
- Graham Ward - guitar, backing vocals, arranger

Additional musicians

- Martin Bullard - synth bass, keyboards
- Wesley Magoogan - saxophone (track 1)
- Louis Resto - bass (track 9), additional keyboards (track 9)

Production

- Mike Howlett - producer
- Steve Power - engineer
- Don Was - producer (tracks 8, 9)
- Frank Filipetti - producer (track 9), engineer (track 9)
- Phil Brown - engineer (track 8)
- Ian Gillespie - digital editing
- Denis Blackham - digital EQ, digital mastering
- Kevin Metcalfe - direct metal mastering

Other

- The Design Clinic - design
- Paul Cox - photography
