= The Ward Brothers =

British pop-rock band

- "The Ward Brothers" as shown on the 1987 single "Why Do You Run".

Background information
- Origin: Barnsley, England
- Genres: Pop rock, new wave
- Years active: 1986–1987, 1994–1996
- Labels: Siren, Prestige, Virgin, A&M
- Past members: Dave Ward; Derek Ward; Graham Ward

The Ward Brothers were a British pop-rock band, who scored a top 40 hit in the UK with their 1986 single "Cross That Bridge".

== History ==
The Ward Brothers formed in Barnsley, England in 1986, with vocalist and drummer Dave Ward, keyboardist Derek Ward and guitarist Graham Ward. The band signed to Siren Records in 1986 and released four singles and an album.

Their debut single "Easy Prey" was not a commercial success, but the follow-up, "Cross That Bridge", broke the band into the Top 40 when it reached at No. 32 on the UK Singles Chart in early 1987. The follow-up, "Why Do You Run?", reached No. 81 in the UK, and a final single, "I Trusted You", failed to chart. The album, Madness of It All, which was released in 1987, was produced by Mike Howlett. Don Was and Frank Filipetti produced the title track, and Was produced "Cross That Bridge".

In 1988, album's title track appeared in the episode "Love at First Sight" of the series Miami Vice. The song also appeared in the 1986 film The American Way, and "Why Do You Run?" appeared in the 1987 film Stakeout.

The band re-emerged in 1994 with a new album, Wave Goodbye to Grandma, which was released by the Serious Recording Company. It was re-released two years later on Prestige Records. The 1996 re-issue spawned one single, "Friends", which was released in the UK and the Netherlands.

== Members ==
- Dave Ward – lead vocals, backing vocals, percussion, drums
- Derek Ward – keyboards, programming
- Graham Ward – guitars, backing vocals

== Discography ==
=== Albums ===
- Madness of It All (1987)
- Wave Goodbye to Grandma (1994)

=== Singles ===
- "Easy Prey" (1986)
- "Cross That Bridge" (1986) - UK No. 32, NL No. 32
- "Why Do You Run?" (1986) - UK No. 81
- "I Trusted You" (1987)
- "Friends" (1996)
