= KindWords =

- Original author: Ian Potts
- Developer: Disc Company
- Release: January 1, 1987; 39 years ago
- Platform: Amiga
- Size: 3.5 inch floppy disk

KindWords is a word processor for the Amiga computer. It allows for capturing of text, changing of text formatting, printing and many other aspects of desktop publishing.
