= Kamikaze Shirt =

Studio album by Fischer-Z
- Released: 1993
- Genre: New wave
- Length: 42:00
- Label: Harvest
- Producer: John Watts

Fischer-Z chronology
Destination Paradise' (1992)	Kamikaze Shirt (1993)	Stream (1995)

Professional ratings
Review scores
Source	Rating
Allmusic	3/5 stars

Kamikaze Shirt is the seventh album by Fischer-Z. Due to the critical praise the previous album, Destination Paradise received, Fischer-Z carried on in the same style for this album. Still focusing on political observational lyrics, the album is considered to be the darker half of Destination Paradise, dealing with the international "have nots" of the world.

== Track listing ==
1. "The Peaches & Cream"
2. "Killing Time"
3. "Marlon"
4. "And This We Call Crime"
5. "Kamikaze Shirt"
6. "Polythene"
7. "Human Beings"
8. "Stripper in the Mirror"
9. "Stars"
10. "Blue Anemone"
11. "Radio K.I.L.L."
12. "Untitled Track"

== Personnel ==
- John Watts - lead vocals, guitar, keyboard
- Hadji Wazner - guitar
- Count Sinden von Sinden - bass
- Dr. Smith - pianos, synthesizers
- Steve "Svenson" Kellner - drums, percussion

Additional musicians (as credited on CD)

- Kate, Sharon & Harriet - "big girl" vocals
- Lucie, Emille & Leila - "little girl" vocals
- Ian Porter - help & backing vocals on "And This We Call Crime"
