= Punishment of Luxury =

English post-punk band

- Origin: Newcastle, England
- Genre: Post-punk
- Years active: 1976–1984, 1989, 2007–present
- Labels: Small Wonder, United Artists, Liberty, Red Rhino
- Members: Brian Bond; Neville Luxury; Steve Sekrit; Jimi Giro
- Past members: Red Helmet; Les Denham; Tim Magenta; Rab Aitch; David Thompson; Eddie Hall; Tony Wright

Punishment of Luxury, also known as Punilux, are an English post-punk band, formed in Newcastle in 1976. They disbanded in 1984, but reunited briefly in the late 1980s, and again in 2007, and have been active since.

== History ==
From a background working in English fringe theatre groups, Punishment Of Luxury formed in December 1976, in Newcastle. Taking their name from an 1891 painting by Giovanni Segantini in the Walker Art Gallery, Liverpool, the band consisted initially of Brian Bond (born Brian Rapkin - vocals), Neville Luxury (born Neville Atkinson - guitar, vocals), Red Helmet (guitar, vocals), Jimi Giro (bass guitar, vocals), and "Liquid" Les Denham (drums). They released a single, "Puppet Life" on the Small Wonder label in July 1978. In 1979 they signed to United Artists and released the singles "Engine Of Excess" with Mick Avery on drums, then with new drummer Steve Sekrit (born Steven Robson), made "Secrets", and the album Laughing Academy. In the summer of 1979 they played at the Reading Rock Festival after The Cure and before The Tourists and Motörhead. 1980 saw the release of the single "Laughing Academy". An extensive European tour followed and United Artists sent the band into the studio to record another album, a concept album to be called Gigantic Days. However while the recording was still going on, United Artists were taken over by EMI, who dropped the band. A final European tour was followed by Bond's departure.

Neville, Sekrit and Giro recruited guitarist Tim Magenta to a new lineup, now going by the name Punilux. They released a further album on the Red Rhino label, 7 in 1983, with Magenta replaced by Rab Aitch, before Neville Luxury went solo, releasing the mini-album Feels Like Dancing Wartime in 1984. The album Gigantic Days was finally released, on CD, in 1998 by Overground Records.

== Reunion ==
In 2007, they reunited and played a few songs for the bassist Jimi Giro's 50th birthday party. A little more than a year later they landed a gig at a small pub in Gateshead, in the north-east of England called The Three Tuns. The gig was considered a success and was written about in The Guardian newspaper. On 12 June 2009, they played at the Luminaire in Kilburn, North London. They have performed intermittently since.

The band released a CD of new material, titled 5, in March/April 2012.

A definitive, career-spanning, five-CD box set was released on 8 November 2019, called Puppet Life (The Complete Recordings).

== Discography ==
=== Albums ===
- Laughing Academy (1979), United Artists
- 7 (1984), Red Rhino - as Punilux, UK Indie No. 12
- Gigantic Days (the shelved LP) (1998), Overground
- 5 (2012, EP/CD mini-album)

=== Compilation albums ===
- Revolution by Numbers (1997), Overground
- Puppet Life (The Complete Recordings) (2019)

=== Neville Luxury ===
- Feels Like Dancing Wartime (1984), Red Rhino

=== Singles ===
- "Puppet Life" (1978), Small Wonder
- "Engine of Excess" (1979), United Artists
- "Secrets" (1979), United Artists
- "Laughing Academy" (1980), Liberty
- "Hold Me (Never Mould Me)" (1983), Red Rhino - as Punilux, UK Indie No. 36
- "Alien Contact" (1989), P.U.K.
