= Mike Howlett =

British bassist (born 1950)

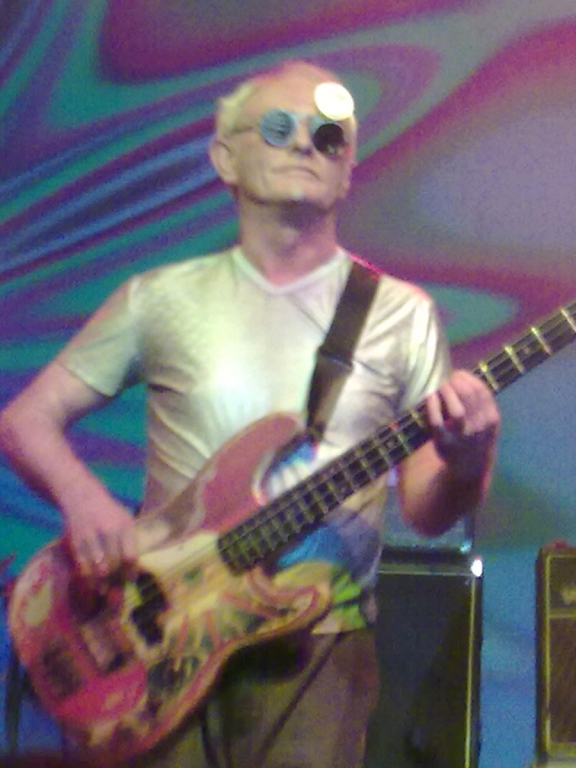
- Howlett live with Gong at HMV Forum in 2009

Background information
- Also known as: Mister T. Being
- Born: Michael John Gilmour Howlett; 27 April 1950 (age 76); Lautoka, Fiji
- Origin: Sydney
- Genres: Progressive rock; new wave
- Occupations: Producer; musician
- Instruments: Bass; vocals
- Formerly of: The Affair; Gong; Strontium 90
- Website: mikehowlett.co.uk

Michael John Gilmour Howlett (born 27 April 1950) is a bass guitar player, record producer and teacher based in the United Kingdom and Australia.

== Career ==
In the late 1960s, Howlett was the bassist in Sydney pop band the Affair, which included vocalist Kerrie Biddell. The group travelled to England after winning a prize in the Hoadley's Battle of the Sounds band competition. Howlett settled in London and in 1973 joined renowned British progressive rock group Gong, which had been founded by an Australian expatriate, Daevid Allen. He remained with Gong until 1977, recording several albums with them and co-writing much of their material later in this period with drummer Pierre Moerlen.

After leaving Gong, Howlett formed the short-lived band Strontium 90, which consisted of himself, Sting, Stewart Copeland and Andy Summers. In addition to being the band's lead bassist and chief songwriter, Howlett performed most of the lead vocals in live performances. The band recorded several demos and played at a Paris Gong reunion concert in May 1977, but disbanded when Summers left to join Copeland and Sting's other project, the Police. An archival collection of Strontium 90 material was released two decades later as Strontium 90: Police Academy.

A few months after the breakup of Strontium 90, Howlett served as bassist for the one-off studio band The Radio Actors, which also included Gong bandmate Steve Hillage on lead guitar and Strontium 90 bandmate Sting (who came to the group by way of Howlett's recommendation) on lead vocals. The band's single, "Nuclear Waste" b/w "Digital Love", was reissued on CD in 1995 with liner notes and three bonus tracks, though none of the bonus tracks involved Howlett.

In the 1980s, Howlett became an in-demand producer, with a string of notable credits. He produced many hit singles and albums for leading new wave music pop acts including A Flock of Seagulls, the Alarm, China Crisis, Martha and the Muffins, Orchestral Manoeuvres in the Dark, Stephen Duffy, Gang of Four and Comsat Angels. He also produced the album Secret Secrets for Joan Armatrading in 1985.

Gong performs occasional reunion gigs around the world, and Howlett usually joins them. In 1993, he launched a record label, Mauve, which released albums by singer-songwriters Rafa Russo, Debbie Cassell and Jay Fisher. From 2005 to 2009, Howlett was chairman of the Music Producers Guild (MPG).

Howlett was awarded a PhD on the subject of record production in 2009 and has lectured in music technology at several universities, including the University of Glamorgan (now the University of South Wales) in Pontypridd, Wales and Thames Valley University (Ealing, London). In 2009, he became Head of Music at Queensland University of Technology in Brisbane, Australia and is an adjunct professor for QUT.

== Personal life ==
Howlett is married with three children and two grandchildren. He lives in West London.

== Production credits ==
Fischer-Z

- Word Salad (1979); Going Deaf for a Living (1980)

Punishment of Luxury

- Laughing Academy (1979)

Martha and the Muffins

- "Insect Love" (1979); Metro Music (1979); "Echo Beach" (1980); Trance and Dance (1980)

The Revillos

- Rev Up (Snatzo/Dindisc, 1980)

The Teardrop Explodes

- "When I Dream" (1980)

Orchestral Manoeuvres in the Dark

- "Messages" (1980); "Enola Gay" (1980); "Souvenir" (1981)

Sniff 'n' the Tears

- Love/Action (1981); Ride Blue Divide (1982)

Thompson Twins

- "Perfect Game" and "Politics" from A Product Of... (Participation) (1981)

Any Trouble

- Wheels in Motion (Stiff, 1981)

Tears for Fears

- "Pale Shelter" (1982)

Gang of Four

- Songs of the Free (1982)

Blancmange

- Happy Families (1982); "Living on the Ceiling" (1982)

A Flock of Seagulls

- A Flock of Seagulls (1982); Listen (1983)

Hunters & Collectors

- Hunters & Collectors (1982); Payload (EP, 1982)

The Comsat Angels

- Land (1983); 7 Day Weekend (1985, not all songs)

China Crisis

- Working with Fire and Steel – Possible Pop Songs Volume Two (1983)

John Foxx

- "Twilight's Last Gleaming" from The Golden Section (1983)

Berlin

- Love Life (1984, not all songs)

Joan Armatrading

- Secret Secrets (1985)

The Alarm

- Strength (1985)

The Ward Brothers

- Madness of It All (1986, not all songs)

TV21

- All Join Hands (1982)
