= Kerrie Biddell =

- Born: Kerrie Agnes Biddell; 8 February 1947; Kings Cross, New South Wales
- Died: 5 September 2014 (aged 67)
- Genre: Jazz
- Occupations: Session; singer; pianist; music vocal teacher
- Years active: 1967–2001

Kerrie Agnes Biddell (8 February 1947 – 5 September 2014) was an Australian jazz and session singer, as well as a vocal teacher.

== Life and career ==
Born in Kings Cross, New South Wales, the only child of Irish-Catholic parents Kathleen, a jazz pianist and Dan, a solicitors clerk who also played piano. Biddell was sent to St Vincent's Convent in Potts Point at the age of six, soon after her father left her mother. In 1962, Biddell suffered a collapsed lung and rheumatoid arthritis, the latter of which affected her piano playing. She decided to become a singer, and, in 1967, sang for Dusty Springfield on backing vocals. Impressed, Springfield suggested she become a lead singer.

=== 1960s ===
Biddell joined the local band The Echoes, and in 1968, The Affair. Affair guitarist Jim Kelly called Biddell "a world-class vocalist". With her voice, the group could do various musical styles, such as Aretha Franklin-type soul, Sly Stone funk, and Jimmy Webb compositions. In 1969, the national competition Hoadley's Battle of the Sounds added a vocal-group category to its main pop/rock category. Kelly stated that The Affair was not a vocal group, but Biddell "rehearsed us till we were". The group won the category, with its prize being a trip to London, where the group relocated in mid-1970, only to disband months later. Before disbanding, they recorded Sly and the Family Stone's "Sing a Simple Song", which would become one of Biddell's signature songs.

=== 1970s-2001 ===
Biddell returned to Australia in 1970, where she toured with the Daly-Wilson Big Band, which performed swing music, in between her stint with Wilson, she also did tours with Dudley Moore, Cilla Black and Buddy Rich In 1972, she married David Glyde, a former alto saxophonist for Sounds Incorporated, who opened for The Beatles on tour. Glyde had contacts in Canada, and he and Biddell moved there. Her career as a session singer began soon after. She and her husband toured in the United States, including clubs in Las Vegas. She was offered a three-year six-figure USD contract with the MGM Grand Hotel and Casino, and, despite being desperate to be a star, she discovered she did not care for the business side of Vegas. "I started to see that the amount they wanted to take away from me was too much," she stated, and moved back to Australia in 1972, enrolling in the Sydney Conservatorium of Music.

She and Glyde divorced in 1977. She sang on hundreds of jingles, television shows and film scores, including the theme from series Sons and Daughters

Biddell formed the group Compared to What which featured young Australian jazz talent including pianist Mark Isaacs, who was to write an obituary for her in 2014.

In 1983, she joined the faculty of the Jazz Diploma course at the Conservatorium, where she periodically taught into her later years. In 1992, she wrote a one-woman show, Legends, which later included June Bronhill, Lorrae Desmond, Toni Lamond, and Jeanne Little. In 2001, due to poor health, she retired from performing, but continued her teaching career.

== Death ==
On 4 September 2014, Biddell died from a stroke. She was 67.

== Discography ==
=== Studio albums ===
List of albums, with selected chart positions
Title	Album details	Peak chart positions
Title	Album details	AUS
The Exciting Daly-Wilson Big Band (Daly-Wilson Big Band featuring Kerrie Biddell)	Released: 1972; Format: LP; Label: Festival Records	-
Kerrie Biddell	Released: March 1973; Format: LP; Label: Bootleg (BLA 030)	11
Only the Beginning	Released: June 1975; Format: LP; Label: EMI (EMA 314)	66
Compared to What (Compared to What featuring Kerrie Biddell)	Released: 1979; Format: LP; Label: EMI Studios 301 (SS301)	-
There Will Never Be Another You (with The Julian Lee Trio and Les Crosby)	Released: 1992; Format: CD, Cassette; Label: North Supply (PJLCD0012)	-
The Singer	Released: 1999; Format: CD; Label: ORIGiN (OR 015)	-

== Awards ==
=== Mo Awards ===
The Australian Entertainment Mo Awards (commonly known informally as the Mo Awards), were annual Australian entertainment industry awards. They recognise achievements in live entertainment in Australia from 1975 to 2016. Kerrie Biddell won three awards in that time.

Year	Nominee / work	Award	Result (wins only)
1989	Kerrie Biddell	Jazz Vocal Performer of the Year	Won
1993	Kerrie Biddell	Jazz Vocal Performer of the Year	Won
1995	Kerrie Biddell	Jazz Vocal Performer of the Year	Won
