= Laughing Academy =

Studio album by Punishment of Luxury
- Released: 1979
- Label: United Artists

Professional ratings
Review scores
Source	Rating
Trouser Press	unfavourable

Laughing Academy is the debut studio album by English band Punishment of Luxury, released in 1979 by record label United Artists.

== Track listing ==
1. "Puppet Life" – 3:03
2. "Funk Me" – 4:00
3. "The Message" – 3:55
4. "All White Jack" – 3:57
5. "Obsession" – 4:43
6. "Radar Bug / Metropolis" – 5:43
7. "British Baboon" – 4:03
8. "Babalon" – 4:00
9. "Excess Bleeding Heart" – 2:38
10. "Laughing Academy" – 5:01
