= Destination Paradise =

Studio album by Fischer-Z
- Released: October 1992
- Genre: Pop
- Length: 47:00
- Label: Harvest
- Producer: John Watts, Richard Evans

Fischer-Z chronology
Fish's Head (1989)	Destination Paradise (1992)	Kamikaze Shirt (1993)

Professional ratings
Review scores
Source	Rating
Allmusic	4.5/5 stars

Destination Paradise was the sixth studio album by Fischer-Z. The album saw a change of record label, and another completely different line-up, still with John Watts as the original member. The album featured several lyrics of John Watt's acute observations of political events. Following the release of the album, Watts as usual, toured and promoted the album extensively, which reportedly helped to garner a new generation of fans, and Destination Paradise has been regarded as a "dynamic and cinematic" album.

== Track listing ==
All songs written by John Watts.

1. "Destination Paradise"
2. "Will You Be There?"
3. "Tightrope"
4. "Say When"
5. "Caruso"
6. "Marguerite Yourçenar"
7. "Saturday Night"
8. "Mockingbird Again"
9. "Still in Flames"
10. "Time for Rita"
11. "Of All The"
12. "Count to Ten"
13. "So Hard"
14. "Further from Love"

== Personnel (as credited on CD) ==
- John Watts - singing, strumming acoustics & bashing the occasional Telecaster
- Hadji Wasner - riffing, twanging & twirling his electric guitar (and more)
- Count Sinden von Sinden - bass guitar (for he is the...)
- Dr. Smith - tickling, twinkling & caressing pianos, synthesizers & samplers
- Steve "Svenson" Kellner - slapping, rimming & cracking a variety of drums & other percussive devices

=== Additional musicians ===
- Peter Gabriel - guest vocals
- David Rhodes - guest vocals
- Dame Alison Jiear - guest vocals
- Pandit Danesh - (instrument not specified)
- Simon Clarke - keyboards of a monstrous analogue nature, keyboard "marimba" man
- Richard Evans - mandolin (to be mixed louder please)
- Miles Bould - percussion (in tandem with Svenson)
- Phil Spalding- bass
- Carol Steele - percussion
- Alex Gifford - saxophone & New Orleans brass arrangement
- Sid Gauld - trumpet
- Miles Gauld - tambourine
- Chris Lawrence - trombone
- Jody Linscott - Latin percussion
- Roger Boulton - enchanting on heavenly strings
- Graeme Pleeth - keyboards
- Luke Cresswell - "no dustbins percussion"
- Helena Paul - "time to dream vocals"
- Dean Speedwell Brodrick - string arrangement
