= Stream (album) =

Studio album by Fischer-Z
- Released: 1995
- Genre: New wave
- Length: 46:00
- Label: SPV
- Producer: John Watts, Pete Glenister

Fischer-Z chronology
| Kamikaze Shirt (1993) | Stream (1995) | Ether (2002) |

Professional ratings
Review scores
| Source | Rating |
|---|---|
| AllMusic | 4.5/5 stars |

Stream is the eighth album by Fischer-Z. The album contains the single "Protection", which explored the dark area of child exploitation. Following the album, John Watts concentrated on his solo career again, making this the last album by Fischer-Z, before its slight revival again in 2002.

== Track listing ==
All songs written by John Watts except where noted.

1. "Jesus Give Me Back My Life"
2. "Dream Wedding"
3. "Protection"
4. "Big Man Buddha"
5. "Buffalo Heart"
6. "Stream of Unconscious"
7. "You Never Cross The Same River Twice" (John Watts, Pete Glenister)
8. "Magic Moon"
9. "No Strings"
10. "Goldrush Town"
11. "Here and Now"

== Personnel ==
- John Watts – vocals, guitars
- Hadji Wazner – electric guitar
- Peter Sinden ("Count Sinden von Sinden") – bass
- Chuck Sabo – drums, percussion

=== Additional musicians ===
- Simon Clark – keyboards
- Pete Glenister – guitar
- Ingrid Glenister – backing vocals
- Alison Jiaer – backing vocals
- Iren, Lucie, Emillie & Leila Watts – backing vocals

=== Additional personnel ===
- Jon Gray, Philip Tennant – Recording engineers
- Pete Glenister, Victor van Vugt – Mixing
- Tim Young – Mastering
- Neil Butler – Art director
- Perry King – Photography
- Quentin King – Designer
