= Strontium 90 (band) =

British punk band (1977)

- Also known as: The Elevators
- Origin: London, England
- Genres: New wave; progressive rock; punk rock
- Years active: 1977
- Label: Panagea/Ark 21
- Spinoffs: The Police
- Spinoff of: Gong
- Past members: Mike Howlett; Sting; Andy Summers; Stewart Copeland

Strontium 90 were a short-lived British band active in 1977 whose members were Mike Howlett (bass, vocals) from Gong, Sting (vocals, guitar, bass) and Stewart Copeland (drums) from the Police, and Andy Summers (guitar). The band is most notable for introducing Summers to Sting and Copeland.

Strontium 90 were formed in mid-1977 by Howlett after he had left Gong and recruited Sting and Summers to participate in this new project. Howlett had wanted to recruit drummer Chris Cutler, but he was unavailable so Sting brought along Copeland from his own band the Police.

Strontium 90 recorded several demonstration tracks at Virtual Earth Studios, and performed at the Gong re-union concert in Paris on 28 May 1977. The four-piece also performed at a London club as The Elevators in July 1977.

An album with some studio and live tracks was released in 1997 under the title Strontium 90: Police Academy on Ark 21 Records.
