= Red Skies over Paradise =

Studio album by Fischer-Z
- Released: March 1981
- Recorded: December 5–15, 1980
- Studio: The Manor Studios, Shipton-on-Cherwell, Oxfordshire
- Genre: New wave
- Length: 46:00
- Label: Liberty
- Producer: John Watts, Richard Manwaring

Fischer-Z chronology
Going Deaf for a Living (1980)	Red Skies over Paradise (1981)	Reveal (1987)

Professional ratings
Review scores
Source	Rating
AllMusic	3/5 stars

Red Skies over Paradise is a 1981 album by Fischer-Z. This was the last album released under the classic line-up, despite the departure of keyboardist Steve Skolnik. This album featured many songs about politics and several references to the Cold War, the album title and cover in particular. The album received positive reviews from fans and encouraged band leader John Watts to pursue a solo career, thus ending Fischer-Z until its revival in 1987. Two of these songs were used in Deutschland 83. The sleeve stated: "This record owes a lot to Brighton."

== Track listing ==
All songs written and arranged by John Watts

Side A

1. "Berlin" - 4:32
2. "Marliese" - 3:52
3. "Red Skies over Paradise (A Brighton Dream)" - 4:32
4. "In England" - 2:43
5. "You'll Never Find Brian Here" - 2:08
6. "Battalions of Strangers" - 5:03

Side B

1. "Song and Dance Brigade" - 3:02
2. "The Writer" - 3:20
3. "Bathroom Scenario" - 3:47
4. "Wristcutter's Lullaby" - 2:46
5. "Cruise Missiles" - 4:15
6. "Luton to Lisbon/Multinationals Bite" - 5:34

== Charts ==
Chart (1981)	Peak position
Australian (Kent Music Report)	70

== Personnel ==
Fischer-Z

- John Watts - lead vocals, guitar, keyboards
- David Graham - bass, bass pedals, backing vocals
- Steve Liddle - drums, backing vocals

Technical

- Steve Parker - mix engineer
- John Pasche - art direction
- Philip Dunn - artwork, painting

== Sales and certifications ==
Certifications for Red Skies over Paradise
Region	Certification	Certified units/sales
Netherlands (NVPI)	Gold	50,000^{^}
^{^} Shipments figures based on certification alone.

== Notes ==
The album features the singles, "Marliese", "Wristcutter's Lullaby" (b/w "You'll Never Find Brian Here") and "The Writer".
