= Going Deaf for a Living =

Studio album by Fischer-Z
- Released: May 1980
- Studios: The Manor, Shipton-on-Cherwell, Oxfordshire
- Genre: New wave
- Length: 35:00
- Label: United Artists
- Producer: Mike Howlett

Fischer-Z chronology
| Word Salad (1979) | Going Deaf for a Living (1980) | Red Skies over Paradise (1981) |

Professional ratings
Review scores
| Source | Rating |
|---|---|
| AllMusic | 4.5/5 stars |

Going Deaf for a Living is a 1980 album by Fischer-Z. This was the second album by Fischer-Z featuring the "classic line-up". The guitar on this album was made more prominent, after their rather keyboard prominent debut. This album, as well the following Red Skies Over Paradise, are considered by fans as the best work to be produced by Fischer-Z. The album featured the singles "Room Service", "Crazy Girl", "Limbo" and the most popular "So Long", which hit #72 in the UK singles chart, #15 in Australia and #26 in the Netherlands.

"So Long" was the first single by Fischer-Z to receive a music video, and still garners regular airplay on radio stations in Europe, and Australia.

== Track listing ==
All songs written by John Watts

1. "Room Service"
2. "So Long"
3. "Crazy Girl"
4. "No Right"
5. "Going Deaf For A Living"
6. "Pick Up/Slip Up"
7. "Crank"
8. "Haters"
9. "Four Minutes in Durham (With You)"
10. "Limbo"

== Charts ==
| Chart (1980) | Peak position |
|---|---|
| Australian (Kent Music Report) | 52 |

== Personnel ==
Fischer-Z

- John Watts - lead vocals, guitar
- Steve Skolnik - keyboards
- David Graham - bass
- Steve Liddle - drums

Technical

- Richard Manwaring - engineer
- John Pasche - sleeve, art direction, design
- Phil Jude - cover photography
