= Fischer-Z =

British rock band

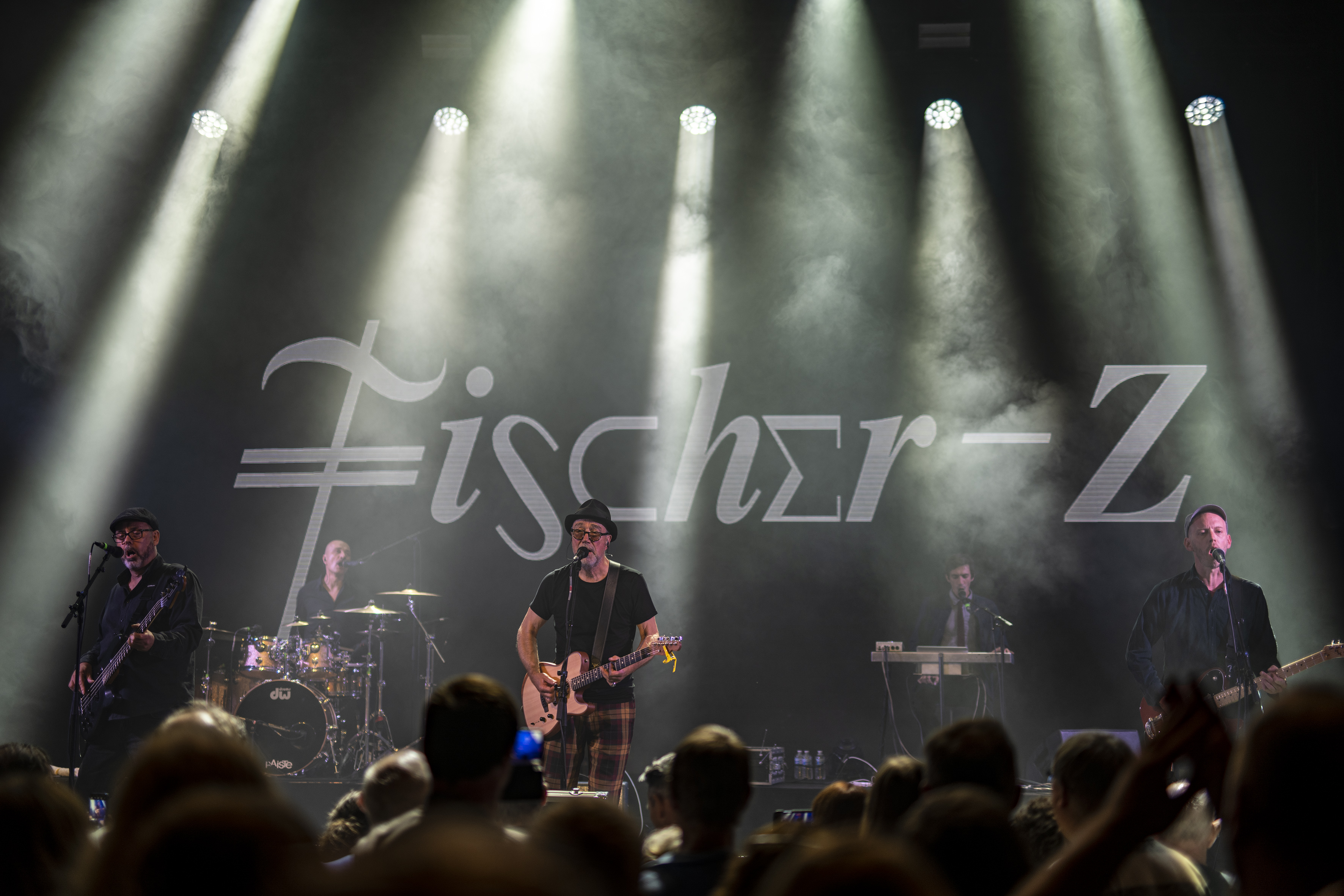
- Fischer-Z

Background information
- Origin: Sandhurst, Berkshire, England
- Genres: Rock; new wave
- Years active: 1976–1982; 1987–present
- Members: John Watts; Marian Menge; David Purdye; Oliver Newton; Ives Mergaerts
- Past members: Steve Skolnik; David Graham; Steve Liddle; Sinisa Banovic; Adrien Rodes

Fischer-Z are a British rock group and main creative project of singer, guitarist and poet John Watts. In 1982, Watts temporarily dissolved Fischer-Z and started a solo career under his own name. John Watts has gone on to release both solo and Fischer-Z projects. The original line-up consisted of Watts (vocals, guitar), Steve Skolnik (keyboards), David Graham (bass) and Steve Liddle (drums).

Fischer-Z found success across Europe and sold more than two million albums. Joint recordings were made with Peter Gabriel, Steve Cropper and Dexys Midnight Runners. Fischer-Z performed alongside James Brown in East Berlin and toured with The Police and Dire Straits. They also toured the US and Canada and were on the bill with Bob Marley on his last festival tour of Europe. John Watts has released 26 albums and played around 4,000 concerts. Fischer-Z have continued to release new music and tour.

== History ==
While studying clinical psychology and working in psychiatric clinics, John Watts formed Fischer-Z with Stephen Skolnik in 1977. The first performances took place in English punk clubs and the first Fischer-Z album, Word Salad, was released in 1979 on United Artists Records, in parallel with The Buzzcocks and The Stranglers. The band broke through thanks to John Peel playing their first single 'Remember Russia' multiple times and championing the band. Thanks to this, Fischer-Z appeared on The Old Grey Whistle Test and following the European success of their second single "The Worker", they appeared on Top of the Pops in 1979. A second album, Going Deaf for a Living, was released in 1980, as was the hit single "So Long", which in 1981 found success on the newly founded TV channel MTV. 1981 also brought the release of Fischer-Z's third and most commercially successful album Red Skies Over Paradise, which featured the singles "Marliese" and "Berlin". Due to the success of these albums, Fischer-Z played over 200 shows between 1980 and 1981 across the UK, Europe, the US and Canada. Watts dissolved the original Fischer-Z line up in the summer of 1981, believing that the band had moved too far from their original punk ideals.

Watts then started a solo career and released his first two solo albums, One More Twist (1982) and The Iceberg Model (1983). These albums produced the politically charged single "One Voice" which he performed at the No Nukes Festival in 1982. In 1984, Watts founded a band called The Cry and released the pop/dance album Quick Quick Slow, which was produced by Jimmy Douglass. In 1985, Watts released the song "Dark Crowds of Englishmen", which dealt with the miners' strike of 1984–1985.

In 1987, John Watts decided to re-establish Fischer-Z in a different form. In this line up, the band had further success, with hit singles "The Perfect Day" (1988) and "Say No" (1989) from the albums Reveal (1988) and Fish's Head (1989).

In 1991, the next Fischer-Z album Destination Paradise was recorded at Peter Gabriel's Real World Studios. The song "Further From Love" and the title song highlight the sufferings of the civilian population during wartime. The next two Fischer Z albums were Kamikaze Shirt (1993) and Stream (1995).

1997 and 1999 brought the release of two Watts albums: Thirteen Stories High and Bigbeatpoetry. For Bigbeatpoetry Watts signed with Motor Records and worked with the German DJ Ingo Werner. This would produce the single "Walking The Doberman". In 2000, Watts released the Spiritual Headcase album, which was a remix of Bigbeatpoetry by Peter Ely.

Watts' era of multimedia projects began with "Ether" in 2002. For this, he traveled throughout Europe and collected musical contributions of local musicians. Minimal equipment was used for the recordings: just a high-quality microphone and a laptop. The entire project was filmed and released as an album and as a DVD.

There was a 2004 reunion of the original band for one short show which featured on the Garden Party DVD which was released along with the Fischer-Z Highlights 1979–2004 25th anniversary compilation album.

In 2005, Watts released Real Life Is Good Enough, a 2-piece guitar and drums album recorded with Sam Walker. After touring that album, Watts found strangers on his travels from 10 different European countries and wrote a song for each of them based on their life stories. Those 10 songs became the It Has To Be album which was released in 2007. The next album by Watts was Morethanmusic, which also contained poems and short stories. It contained the single "Head On", which was inspired by Watts' experience of watching a seven-year-old child streaming the live execution of Saddam Hussein on their phone. Watts shot a movie for each title, which was released as Morethanmusic & Film in the same year.

In 2011, Watts re-recorded 14 of the most famous Fischer-Z songs with his current band and released it as John Watts – Fischer-Z. In contrast to this release, Watts released an album of live solo recordings the following year called Realistic Man.

In 2015, Watts decided to return with the Fischer-Z name and release the This is My Universe album, which was an introspective look at his own life and the changing world around him. It contained the track "Martha Thargill", in which Watts reassesses the miners' strike 30 years on.

In 2017, Watts released his nineteenth original studio album Building Bridges, which was a statement on the challenges of the time. "Damascus Disco", which encouraged listeners to put aside their differences, was the lead single.

Swimming in Thunderstorms was released in 2019, preceded by the single "Big Wide World".

In 2020, Watts announced the release of a new EP, Choose. Til The Oceans Overflow was released on 8 October 2021. Fischer-Z followed up this release with the Triptych band album.

== Discography ==
- Word Salad (1979)
- Going Deaf for a Living (1980)
- Red Skies over Paradise (1981)
- Reveal (1987)
- Fish's Head (1989)
- Destination Paradise (1992)
- Kamikaze Shirt (1993)
- Stream (1995)
- Ether (2002)
- This is My Universe (2015)
- Building Bridges (2017)
- Swimming in Thunderstorms (2019)
- Til the Oceans Overflow (2021)
- Red Skies over Paradise – The Berlin Sessions (2022)
- Triptych (2024)
- Fischer-Z Solo – Live (2023)
