= John Watts (singer) =

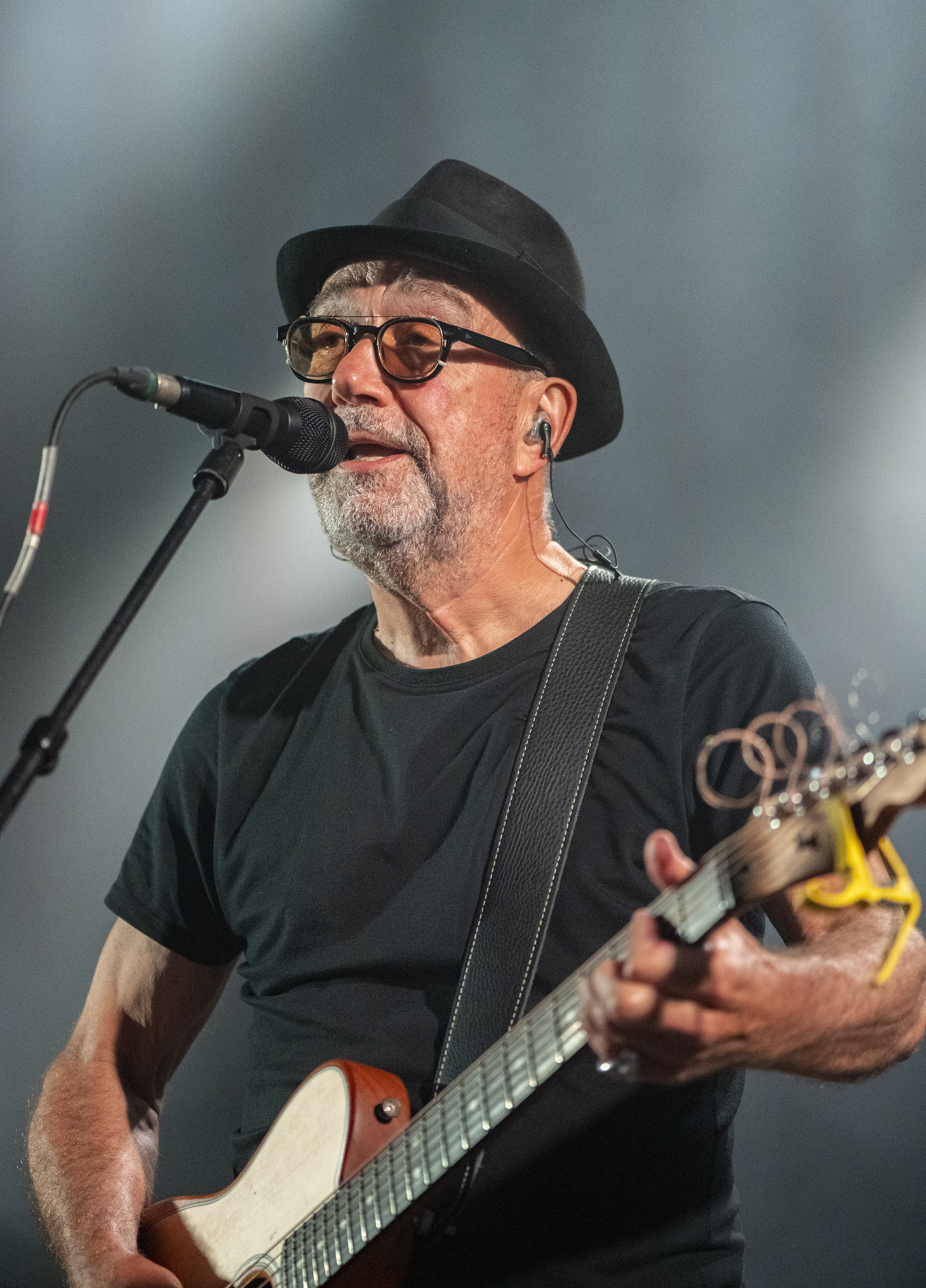

Background information
- Born: 27 December 1954 (age 71); Frimley, Surrey, England
- Instruments: Vocals; guitar; keyboards
- Years active: 1976–present
- Member of: Fischer-Z
- Website: johnwatts.co.uk

John Watts (27 December 1954) is a British musician and multimedia artist. He was born into a family of singers on 27 December 1954 in Frimley, Surrey. Watts began his career as a mental health worker having studied clinical psychology before finding success as a musician with his band Fischer-Z. He currently lives and works in Brighton, UK.

== Career ==
=== Fischer-Z ===
Watts formed the band Fischer-Z with Steve Skolnik at Brunel University in 1976. Arriving at a point where punk, art wave, and reggae crossed over, they secured a record deal with UA in 1978 alongside Buzzcocks, The Stranglers, and Dr. Feelgood.

Their first album, Word Salad, was released in 1979 and was a cult success in the UK (John Peel supported the single "Remember Russia"), but an even bigger critical success and commercial start across continental Europe. There were substantial appearances on The Old Grey Whistle Test and a first Top of the Pops with "The Worker" single.

The second album, entitled Going Deaf for a Living (1980), reinforced Watts' trademark insightful and humorous view of the world set against strong melodies. It included the track, "So Long", his first chart hit single across Europe and in Australia. The band toured extensively throughout Europe and also made their first trip to America. European success was growing fast and the demand for a new album brought Watts back with the powerfully atmospheric Red Skies Over Paradise (1981). A performance at Pinkpop Festival that summer followed and also a performance on the bill with Bob Marley on his final European festival tour.

Watts dissolved Fischer-Z in summer 1981.

=== Solo career and Fischer-Z reformation ===
His first solo album, One More Twist, was released in 1982 along with the debut solo single, One Voice, and was followed in 1983 by The Iceberg Model (1983). This project incorporated Dexys Midnight Runners' brass section, strings, improvisations and experimental techniques usually associated with modern classical music. The Quick Quick Slow album (1984) followed, which he released as The Cry.

Watts reformed Fischer-Z in 1987. Their new album, Reveal, appeared early in 1988. This included their biggest single success to date, "The Perfect Day". Fans found it difficult to differentiate between Watts's identity and that of his band Fischer-Z. This was a new sound and totally different personnel. His reluctance to perform older classic material in its original arrangement and his total emphasis on new work has become his trademark. "My only obligation is to be good, not to play what the audience want." The album represented a commercial high point, but coincided with a lengthy period of personal and family upheaval for Watts.

A second album, Fish's Head, arrived a year later (1989), including the single "Say No". In this period Watts performed to 167,000 people at a Peace Festival in East Berlin along with James Brown. He was interviewed about Thatcherism on German national news. After a change of record companies, Watts combined two different sets of recordings to produce the Destination Paradise album (1992). The title track was a chart single and it once again demonstrated Watts's acute observation of political events. Will You Be There? was another chart single and was adopted by the fans as a firm live favourite.

Watts's next project was the Kamikaze Shirt album (1994). The single "Human Beings", was a harrowing indictment of the low value of human life in many parts of the world. "Protection", the first single from his next album Stream (1995), also dealt with child exploitation.

1997 saw the release of Thirteen Stories High (1997). Until then, Watts had worked with a variety of musicians and band line-ups. Instruments had been arranged around his song structures. From this point in his career he was to turn this method on its head. Bigbeatpoetry (1999) and the Spiritual Headcase Remixes (2000) signalled a much more radical approach to making music. This combined his poetry, prose and song lyrics with Ingo Worner's DJ beats, audio collages and dance floor rhythms. The title track, Bigbeatpoetry, was a substantial 'Beat' style poem half-spoken over a simple hip-hop beat.

His next album, Real Life Is Good Enough (2004), was recorded spontaneously in a raw 'back to basics' fashion. This was organic multimedia in a different form, the CD accompanied by a 60-page book of related poetry and short stories. It Has To Be (2006) was the album that followed as a sequel to Real Life Is Good Enough. Again, Watts travelled and explored, with the intention of collecting strangers' 'real-life stories', filmed by Sarah Vermeersch.

His next album, Morethanmusic (2011), reinforced his reputation as "an artist in music and words." Instead of releasing singles, Watts made exhibitions of artifacts and wrote customised songs.

Watts's new project, entitled World Go Round (2013 – present), is a multimedia combination of a play entitled The Last Picasso, an album called World Go Round and poetry book called The Grand National Lobotomy. Watts performed the play at the Edinburgh Festival alongside a world tour incorporating different local musicians at each venue and with a variety of musical styles.

== Discography ==
- One More Twist (1982)
- The Iceberg Model (1983)
- Quick Quick Slow (1984) (Released under the moniker: "The Cry")
- Thirteen Stories High (1997) (Released under the moniker: "J.M. Watts")
- Bigbeatpoetry (1999) (Released under the moniker: "Watts")
- Spiritual Headcase (2000) (Released under the moniker: "Watts")
- Ether Music & Film (2002)
- Real Life Is Good Enough (2005)
- It Has To Be (2006)
- Morethanmusic & Films (2009)
- John Watts - Fischer-Z (2011)
- This Is My Universe (2015)
- Building Bridges (2017)
- Swimming In Thunderstorms (2019)
- Til The Oceans Overflow (2021)
- Red Skies Over Paradise - The Berlin Sessions (2022) (John Watts solo recording)
- Triptych (2024)
- Punkt! The Album (2025)
