= Greenock Telegraph =

Local newspaper in Inverclyde, Scotland

- Type: Daily newspaper
- Format: Tabloid
- Owner: USA Today Co.
- Publisher: Newsquest
- Founded: 1857
- Headquarters: Ladyburn Business Centre, 20 Pottery Street, Greenock PA15 2UH
- Circulation: 4,116 (as of 2024)
- Website: greenocktelegraph.co.uk

The Greenock Telegraph is a local daily newspaper serving Inverclyde (the council area containing the towns of Gourock, Greenock and Port Glasgow), Scotland.

Founded in 1857, it was the first halfpenny daily newspaper in Britain. It was for a time Greenock Telegraph and Clyde Shipping Gazette, owing to the massive amount of maritime traffic moving in and out of Greenock's harbours. This information is still published, but only as a column entry.

Originally based in Charles Street, Greenock, the printing works were bombed during the Greenock Blitz in May 1941. However the printers worked on to produce emergency editions, despite sustaining multiple cuts from the shattered glass lodged in the presses.

It is known locally as The Tele (although this is pronounced Tilly). Several features such as Viator (Latin for traveller) have formed part of the Telegraph for decades. Although it concerns itself primarily with news from Inverclyde, West Renfrewshire and North Ayrshire it occasionally runs national stories on its front and inner pages.

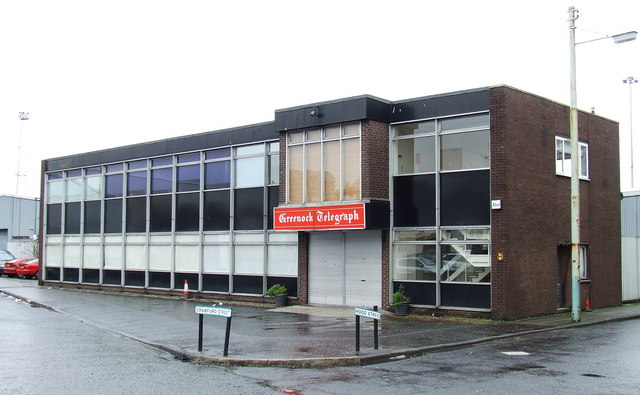
The Crawfurd Street building in 2006.

The paper was printed on site at its previous location in Crawfurd Street in Greenock from the 1960s. Long published by Orr, Pollock & Co., it was published by Clyde & Forth Press, who owned a range of local titles in Central Scotland and a few titles in the south of England. The company went into receivership after the death of Deirdre Romanes and were acquired by management and Lloyds Bank under the name Romanes Media in 2012. Newsquest acquired Romanes Media in 2015.

In 2016, citing "challenging trading conditions" Newsquest Scotland closed the former departments of Romanes Media Group in Clydebank and Greenock, which housed its art desk and sub-editing operations, while its credit control and accountancy departments in Greenock also closed with the loss of a further four jobs; since then, the Telegraph has been printed off-site at Newsquest's press at Carmyle, just southeast of Glasgow. The building that housed the original printing press was stripped out and sold to a local car sales dealership.

In 2022, the newspaper's main office was significantly remodelled with most internal structures being stripped out, editorial and advertising teams relocated, and the remaining building being sub-let as hireable storage space. The Crawfurd Street building was finally closed in October 2025 and the remaining staff moved to premises rented from Riverside Inverclyde at Ladyburn Business Centre, Pottery Street, Greenock. The building has since been repurposed with the former pre-press area and car park now operating as a valeting centre, and the upper offices are let out to local businesses.

The newspaper archive is held at the Watt Institution who have original copies dating back to 1857 which can be viewed on microfilm.

The most recent local Editor was David Goodwin, formerly the title's Court Reporter. Since his departure in 2024, the title is overseen by Newsquest Group Editors, Gillian Murphy and Craig Borland. The current average daily readership is 4,116, falling from its previous figure of 4,691.
