= University of Bristol Theatre Collection =

Theatrical archive and museum

Coordinates: 51.45564°N 2.60065°W

The University of Bristol Theatre Collection was founded in 1951 to serve the University of Bristol Department of Drama. It is now one of the world's largest archives of British Theatre History. It is a fully accredited Archive and Museum and home to the Live Art Archive.

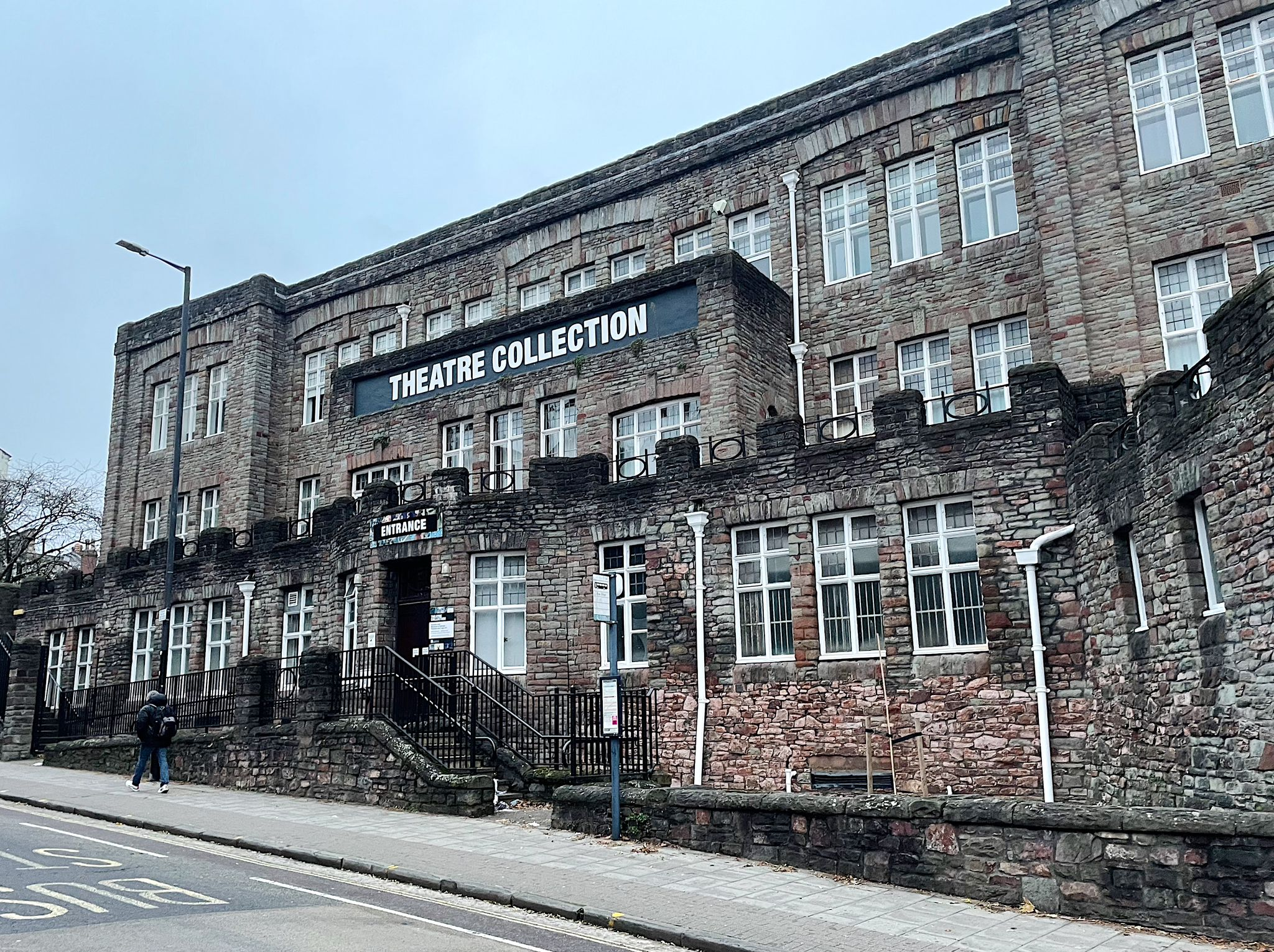
University of Bristol Theatre Collection (main Park Row entrance), 21 Park Row, Bristol BS1 5LT. The building was constructed in 1911–1912 to house the Vandyck Printers Limited.

== History ==
The Theatre Collection was established in 1951 following a symposium led by Glynne Wickham which called for Universities to endorse the policy of studying drama in the context of theatre. Wickham instigated the purchase of its first acquisitions and laid the foundations for the Theatre Collection with funds awarded to the University of Bristol by the Rockefeller Foundation. From the outset it was designed to be a working collection of theatre history, to serve scholars and practising theatre artists alike.

In 1969 the university made an award from its Appeal Fund to provide the Collection with adequate storage and access facilities within the department of drama. The first official keeper of the Theatre Collection was Anne Brooke Barnett (died 2009) who managed the holdings from 1966 to 1989. The Assistant Keeper from 1971 until Anne Brooke Barnett's retirement was Christopher Robinson (died 2003), who succeeded her and was Keeper until his own retirement in 1999.

In 2010 the Theatre Collection received a funding allocation from The Higher Education Funding Council for England (HEFCE) to support it being accessible to the wider Higher Education community. Benefactors have also supported the work of the Theatre Collection.

Established in 1976, the Friends of the University of Bristol Theatre Collection supports the Theatre Collection in various ways. As well as financial support members also engage through volunteering and other activities and events, such as exhibition launches, talks, and visits. One of the Friends' most successful initiatives was raising £10,000 towards the archive of Oliver Messel, one of the foremost stage designers of the twentieth century. The Friends of the Theatre Collection is independent and voluntary. It helps strengthen links between the Theatre Collection and other cultural, theatrical and educational organisations. There are plans for the Theatre Collection to move into a new University of Bristol Library which has received planning permission. The Theatre Collection and other University of Bristol cultural collections will be much more visible and accessible with public exhibition spaces, activities and events.

== Accreditation ==
In 2001 the University of Bristol Theatre Collection was awarded Registered museum status, followed in 2009 by full Accredited Museum status, by the Museums, Libraries and Archives Council, as recognised by the Arts Council of England. In July 2017 it became the first university museum to receive Archive Service Accreditation from The National Archives. Their accreditation report concluded that:

“Bristol University Theatre Collection has an exceptionally strong grasp of its broad network of stakeholders, and their needs. This enables them to deliver impressive outcomes across the board, with outstanding academic delivery and a real capacity to support wider social outcomes. The service is notably innovative and impressive in its determination to grasp challenging issues and to share practice with the wider archives and museum world.”

== Theatre Collections ==
The University of Bristol Theatre Collection holds a wide range of material generated by or related to British Theatre, composed of documentation, designs, playbills, posters, promptscripts, playscripts, costumes, ephemera, artworks (including photographs and magic lantern slides), and Audio-Visual material.

The collection holds nine of the approximately twenty surviving Bristol Old Vic silver tickets, tokens issued to shareholders who helped fund construction of the theatre in 1766.

The catalogue contains collections of:

=== Academics & Historians ===
Including: Dr Kathleen Barker (1925–1991), Richard Digby Day (b. 1941), George Rowell (d. 2001), Richard Southern (1903–1989) and Glynne Wickham (1922–2004)

=== Actors ===
Including: Sir Herbert Beerbohm Tree (1852–1917), Honor Blackman (b. 1925), Stephanie Cole (b. 1941), Edward Gordon Craig (1872–1966), Cyril Fletcher (1913–2005), Rosalinde Fuller (1892–1982), Joyce Grenfell (1910–1979), Sir Henry Irving (1838–1905), Harry Brodribb Irving (1870–1919), Miriam Karlin (1925–2011), Hannah Murray (b. 1989), Leon Quartermaine (1876–1967), Arnold Ridley (1896–1984), Jack Shepherd (b. 1940), Ernest Thesiger (1879–1961), Margaret Tyzack (1931–2011), Hermann Vezin (1829–1910), Peggy Ann Wood (1912–1998), and Susannah York (1939–2011).

=== Designers ===
Including: Graham Barlow (d.2003), Deirdre Clancy, David Cockayne, Edward Gordon Craig (1872–1966), Frederick Crooke (1908–1991), John Elvery (1939–1997), Paul Farnsworth, Laurence Irving (1897–1988), Oliver Messel (1904–1978), Motley Theatre Design Group, Patrick Robertson (1922–2009) and Rosemary Vercoe (1917–2013), Owen Paul Smyth (1895–1979), Yolanda Sonnabend (1935–2015), Alan Tagg (1928–2002), Julia Trevelyan Oman (1930–2003) and David Walker (1934–2008).

=== Directors ===
Including: Norman Ayrton (1924–2017), John Percy Burrell (1910–1972), Hugh Hunt (1911–1993), John Moody (1906–1993), David Phethean (1918–2001), Alex Reeve, and Jules Wright (1948–2015).

=== Organisations ===
Including: Bath Theatre Royal, Bristol Old Vic Company, Desperate Men, Old Vic (London), Shakespeare at the Tobacco Factory, Show of Strength Theatre Company, Theatre Roundabout, Welfare State International, Women's Playhouse Trust, The Critics' Circle, The Gallery First Nighters' Club, National Student Drama Festival, Royal Theatrical Fund, and the University of Bristol Department of Drama.

=== Writers ===
Including: Liane Aukin (1936–2016), Rosemary Davis (1926–2014), Kevin Elyot (1951–2014), Berta Freistadt (1942–2009), Margaret Macnamara (Margaret Mack) (1874–1950), Cecil Madden (1902–1987), George Frederic Norton (1869–1946), Sylvia Rayman (1923–1986), A.C.H. Smith (b. 1935), Phil Smith, Tom Vaughan (1911–1994), Fredrick Witney.

=== Others ===
Collections from a wide range of people connected to the business of theatre are also represented, for example: producers, managers, agents, photographers, marketing and wardrobe professionals.

== Mander and Mitchenson Theatre Collection ==
In December 2010 the theatre collection of the actors and historians Raymond Mander and Joe Mitchenson was legally transferred in its entirety to the University of Bristol Theatre Collection. As an independent charity, the Mander and Mitchenson Theatrical Collection (MMTC) was already one of the three largest theatre history archives in the country. By incorporating the MMTC into its holdings, the University of Bristol Theatre Collection became one of the largest British theatre history archives in the world; in the UK second only to the Victoria and Albert Museum's Theatre & Performance Archive.

== Live Art Archives ==
The Live Art Archive holds physical information about existing Live Art / Performance Art materials, records and publications primarily in England and the UK. It includes the Record of Live Art Practice, the National Review of Live Art Archive, the Digital Performance Archive, the Arts Council England Live Art and Performance Archive, the Franko B Archive, Performance magazine Archive and the original tapes from the queerupnorth Video Archive, together with DVD copies for viewing.

== Library, Reading Room and Exhibition Space ==
The Theatre Collection has a reference library with over 25,000 books and more than 300 journal titles on all aspects of theatre. The catalogue can be viewed on the main University of Bristol Library site. Students, academics, and independent researchers can access the reference library and archival collections in the main reading room. Arranging an appointment in advance is highly recommended to facilitate object retrieval, particularly as some of the holdings are stored off-site.

The small exhibition area showcases aspects of the collections and is open to the general public.
