= Elvis (musical) =

"Elvis" – The Musical
- Original London Cast Recording
- Music: Various Artists
- Lyrics: Various Artists
- Book: Jack Good; Ray Cooney
- Basis: The life and music of Elvis Presley
- Productions: 1977 West End; 1996 West End

Elvis is a jukebox musical based upon the life of American singer Elvis Presley, conceived by and Ray Cooney (producer and co-devisor) and Jack Good (director and co-devisor). It tells the story of Elvis's life and career, from the beginning until his death. The original cast included Shakin' Stevens, who later became the top-selling UK singles artist of the 1980s, and Tracey Ullman.

== Production history ==
=== 1977 production ===
The original West End production opened on November 28, 1977, at the Astoria Theatre in London, which had been converted from a cinema especially for the show by Laurie Marsh. Elvis was portrayed by three performers: Tim Whitnall as Young Elvis, Shakin' Stevens as Middle Elvis in his army and movie star years and PJ Proby as Mature Elvis in his Las Vegas years. Proby was later replaced by Bogdan Kominowski. Live musical accompaniment was provided by the rock and roll revival group, Fumble. The production won the 1977 Evening Standard Theatre Award for Best Musical and played for 614 performances, closing in April 1979. (This can be confirmed by the fact that many of the cast went on to perform in the 1979, revival of Grease which previewed at the Bristol Hippodrome in May 1979). The show did a nine-month UK and Europe tour from December 1979, with full cast replacements except for Stevens and Kominowski, who briefly reprised their roles but were replaced during the tour by Bo Wills as Middle Elvis and Vince Eager as Mature Elvis. Touring commenced at the Pavilion Theatre, Bournemouth and concluded at the King's Theatre, Edinburgh. International stops included Gothenburg, Stockholm, Helsinki, Copenhagen, Oslo, Amsterdam and Den Bosch.

==== Production team ====
- Producer and co-devisor - Ray Cooney
- Director and co-devisor - Jack Good
- Designer - Patrick Robertson
- Lighting - David Hersey
- Costumes - Rosemary Vercoe
- Sound - Autograph
- AV - Ray Millichope
- Musical Director - Keith Strachan
- Musical Supervisor and co-writer - Harry Robinson
- Assistant director - Annabel Leventon
- Choreographer - Carole Todd

==== Cast ====
- PJ Proby (listed as James Proby in programme) - Older Elvis (later replaced by Bogdan Kominowski)
- Bogdan Kominowski - Older Elvis
- Shakin' Stevens - Middle Elvis
- Tim Whitnall - Young Elvis
- Helen Baker - Singer and Dancer
- Tanith Banbury - Singer and Dancer
- Anna Macleod - Singer and Dancer
- Yael O'Dwyer - Singer and Dancer
- Tracey Ullman - Dance Captain and Singer / Dancer
- Richard Ashley - Singer and Dancer
- Paul Felber - Singer and Dancer
- Stephen Leigh - Singer and Dancer
- Richard Piper - Singer and Dancer
- Shaun Simon - Singer and Dancer

==== Musicians ====
- Keith Strachan (MD)
- Sean Mayes
- Mario Ferrari
- Des Henly
- Barry Pike
- Ronnie Caryl
- Bob Efford
- Roy Truman
- Paul Urwin
- Mike Harding
- Tony Hepworth
- Mark Hutchins
- Phil Todd

=== 1996 production ===
In 1996, Bill Kenwright Ltd mounted a modified production at the Prince Of Wales Theatre, directed by Keith Strachan and Carole Todd. PJ Proby returned as Las Vegas Elvis, Tim Whitnall as mid-period Elvis, and Alexander Bar joined them as young Elvis. Various song changes were made to the initial 1977 production. After transferring to the Piccadilly Theatre in 1997, the show toured the UK until 2000.

== Musical numbers ==
- Tupelo Mississippi Flash
- Blue Suede Shoes
- Are You Lonesome Tonight?
- Yesterday
- A World Without Love
- Mystery Train
- Tiger Man
- Loving You
- I Want To Hold Your Hand
- All Round The World
- Six-Five Special
- How Great Thou Art
- King Creole
- Dixieland Rock
- Got A Lot O' Livin' To Do
- Wear My Ring Around Your Neck
- Ready Teddy
- Let's Have a Party
- Tryin' to Get to You
- Too Much
- Teddy Bear
- Such a Night
- Don't
- Good Luck Charm
- Return to Sender
- Burning Love
- My Baby Left Me
- One Night
- Treat Me Nice
- Mean Woman Blues
- Hound Dog
- Jailhouse Rock
- An American Trilogy
