= George Rowell =

George Rowell may refer to:

- George P. Rowell (1838–1908), American advertising executive
- George Rowell (historian) (1923–2001), theatre historian
- George Rowell, American blacksmith, brother of John Samuel Rowell
- George Rowell, American clergyman, completed Gulick-Rowell House; see National Register of Historic Places listings in Hawaii
