= Newark College =

Newark College may refer to:

- Newark College of Arts and Sciences, college in Rutgers University–Newark
- Newark College, Nottinghamshire, branch of Lincoln College, Lincolnshire
- Newark College of Engineering, former name of New Jersey Institute of Technology
- Newark College or Academy, early names of the institution that became University of Delaware
