= Tom Morris (director) =

British theatre director

Tom Morris OBE (born 22 June 1964) is a Tony Award-winning English theatre director, writer and producer. He was the artistic director at BAC (Battersea Arts Centre) from 1995 to 2004 and the artistic director of Bristol Old Vic from 2009 to 2022. He was associate director at the National Theatre from 2004 to 2024.

== Early life and education ==
Morris was born in 1964. He is the younger brother of satirist Chris Morris. He was educated at Stonyhurst College, a Jesuit boys' boarding independent school in Lancashire in north west England, and then read English Literature at Pembroke College, Cambridge, from 1983 to 1986.

== Career ==
From 1988 to 1994, Morris taught English Literature and worked in broadcasting and journalism, as a critic and feature-writer for The Times Literary Supplement, The Independent, The Sunday Times, The Daily Telegraph, The Guardian and The Observer, and appeared on BBC television and radio programmes Kaleidoscope, Night Waves and The Late Show.

During this period he also founded Stage of Fools with Nick Vivian and Nick Sweeting, writing, acting and directing at the Edinburgh Fringe Festival and on tour.

In 1995, Morris became artistic director of Battersea Arts Centre (BAC), staying until 2004 when he joined the National Theatre. While at BAC, Morris established the Scratch Programme, The Sam Shepherd Festival, The Critics Up for Review, The British Festival of Visual Theatre, Playing in the Dark (which marked the launch of Vanishing Point and Sound and Fury and included the first scratch version of Complicité's Mnemonic) and BAC Opera (which produced Jerry Springer: The Opera). While at BAC he also wrote Ben Hur, Jason and the Argonauts and World Cup Final 1966, all with Carl Heap.

In September 2009 Morris took over as artistic director of Bristol Old Vic theatre, overseeing the theatre's revival with executive director Emma Stenning. Morris and Stenning expanded the Old Vic's Outreach Programme into every part of the City, set up the widely imitated artist development programme, the Bristol Ferment, and restored the theatre's national and international reputation with West End transfers and national and international touring for Swallows and Amazons, A Midsummer Night's Dream, Jane Eyre and Peter Pan (both of which were re-created for the National Theatre) and festivals such as Bristol Jam and Bristol Proms. in 2010, he directed the debut production of Helen Edmundson's Swallows and Amazons at Bristol Old Vic. He stepped down from his role at the Bristol Old Vic in 2022, and has since returned to working with London's National Theatre to which he brought Dr Semmelweis in 2023 and a revival of War Horse in 2025.

In 2012 Morris and Stenning oversaw the first phase of a multimillion-pound redevelopment, which included the refurbishment of the theatre's 250 year old auditorium and creation of new office and rehearsal spaces. The second phase of redevelopment of Bristol Old Vic commenced in November 2016. The plans included an overhaul of the front of house spaces and Studio theatre, and was completed in autumn 2018.

As well as directing many theatrical productions, Morris has directed and produced several operas, including The Death of Klinghoffer (ENO and the Met) and a staging of Handel's Messiah (Bristol Proms, 2013).

In 2011 he won the Tony Award for Best Direction of a Play for the Broadway production of War Horse, along with co-director Marianne Elliott. Morris was appointed Officer of the Order of the British Empire (OBE) in the 2016 Birthday Honours for services to theatre.

One interviewer said of Morris: "His tastes are catholic, and frequently risky, but they can produce some of the most inspired, inventive theatre in Britain today."

Morris is Chair of the board of innovating British theatre company Complicité, and is the founding chair of The JMK Trust, set up in honour of James Menzies-Kitchin to provide opportunities for talented young theatre directors.

=== Selected productions ===
- 1999: Macbeth, director, BAC
- 2001: Jerry Springer: The Opera, producer, BAC
- 2003-6: The Wooden Frock, Nights at the Circus, (co-writer with Emma Rice), "Kneehigh"
- 2005: Coram Boy, producer, National Theatre, Olivier
- 2007: A Matter of Life and Death, writer and adaptor, National Theatre, Olivier
- 2007–2011: War Horse, co-director and producer, National Theatre, Olivier; transferring to West End and Broadway.
- 2010: "Juliet and her Romeo", director, Bristol Old Vic
- 2010: Swallows and Amazons, director, Bristol Old Vic
- 2011: The Death of Klinghoffer, director, English National Opera; 2014 at the Metropolitan Opera
- 2013: A Midsummer Night's Dream, director, Bristol Old Vic
- 2015: The Crucible, director, Bristol Old Vic
- 2016: King Lear, director, Bristol Old Vic
- 2016-18: The Grinning Man, director, Bristol Old Vic/Trafalgar Studios
- 2017: Messiah, director, Bristol Old Vic
- 2018: Touching the Void, director, Bristol Old Vic & International tour
- 2019: Breaking the Waves, Director, Scottish Opera, Opera Comique, Paris, Detroit Opera (2023) and Houston Grand Opera (2025)
- 2022: Dr Semmelweis, director, Bristol Old Vic & National Theatre (2023)
- 2025: Othello, director, Theatre Royal Haymarket
- 202506: War Horse, director, National Theatre and on tour
