= Patrick Robertson =

Patrick or Pat Robertson may refer to:

- Pat Robertson (1930–2023), American media mogul, Southern Baptist minister, and college administrator
- Pat Robertson (footballer) (1895–1947), Australian rules footballer for Essendon
- Patrick Robertson, Lord Robertson (1794–1855), Scottish judge
- Patrick Robertson (politician) (1807–1885), British Member of Parliament for Hastings
- Patrick Robertson (set designer) (1922–2009), British theatre designer
- Patrick Robertson (musician) (born 1977), Australian musician and songwriter
- Patrick Robertson (soccer) (born 1986), American soccer player
