= Live Art Archive =

Performance art archive at the University of Bristol

The Live Art Archive is an archive that holds information about existing Live Art / Performance Art materials, records and publications primarily in England and the UK. The physical version of the collection is held at the University of Bristol Theatre Collection.

== Background ==
The Live Art Archive (Audit) commenced in January 1994 when the Arts Council of England invited Dr (now Professor) Barry Smith to formalise and expand his research collection in order to develop as complete and current a record as possible of Live Art events in England circa 1960 to the present day. The Archive also includes records of events held elsewhere in the UK.

== The Archive ==
The Live Art Archives include the Record of Live Art Practice, the National Review of Live Art Archive, the Digital Performance Archive, the Arts Council England Live Art and Performance Archive the Franko B Archive, and Performance magazine Archive. In addition, the Archives hold the original tapes from the queerupnorth Video Archive, together with DVD copies for viewing.

The Archives' holdings also contain a number of smaller collections of Live Art related material in various formats, such as full sets of Hybrid, Primary Sources, and LiveArt magazine, and a complete set of DVDs by the artist Reza Abdoh. Additional Live Art resources, include Liveartwork DVDs, and books to support research into Live Art, which are held in the Theatre Collection library.
