= Fumble (band) =

- Origin: Weston-super-Mare, England
- Genres: Rock, rock and roll
- Years active: 1967–1982
- Labels: Sovereign Records, RCA
- Members: Desmond Russell 'Des' Henly; Mario Angelo Ferrari; Sean Mayes; Barry Dexter Pike
- Website: Band website

Fumble were an English rock and roll revival group, that formed in 1967 and disbanded in 1982. They had specialised in covering rock and roll classics. Although they were never particularly successful, the band did achieve some recognition appearing at some festivals and on the television programme, Oh Boy!.

== History ==
The group was formed in 1966 in Weston-super-Mare, England, by lead guitarist, lead vocalist Des Henly (born 15 July 1947, Weston-super-Mare, Somerset) and bassist, vocalist Mario Ferrari (born 26 January 1947, Weston-super-Mare) under the name of 'The Balloons,' with Sean Mayes on piano, vocals (born 17 March 1945, Stone Allerton, Somerset) and Barry Pike on drums, vocals (born 7 November 1948, Reading, Berkshire). Henly along with Ferrari had been The Iveys (1962 – 1966), along with Remo Ferrari on rhythm guitar and John Watson on drums, later replaced by Bob Davies.

In 1971 they changed their name to Fumble and, in September 1972, released their first album, Fumble, on the EMI-Sovereign record label.

In February and March 1973 they supported David Bowie on his US leg of the Ziggy Stardust Tour. According to the NME, Bowie had been attracted by the cover of their first album and offered them the support slot on the tour. About Fumble, Bowie had been quoted saying that he "adored them" and that they were very unpretentious about revamping the whole area. Five years later in 1978, their keyboardist Sean Mayes was recruited by Bowie to join his band for the Isolar II Tour.

The Bowie tour increased their fame and Fumble played several festivals in 1973, including the Reading Festival, the London Music Festival at Alexandra Palace, and the Roskilde Festival in Denmark, after their single "Hello Mary Lou", had reached number 5 in the Danish charts in June 1973. During the period from 1973 to 1976 they received some coverage in the UK music weekly papers, NME, Sounds and Melody Maker.

The band had signed with RCA Records and released their second album, Poetry in Lotion, in 1974. The album sleeve was designed by Hipgnosis.

From 1977 to 1979, Fumble performed together with Shakin' Stevens and P.J. Proby in the West-End musical Elvis at the Astoria Theatre in London. This was followed by a remake of the 1959 TV series Oh Boy! in 1979, both directed by Jack Good.

Fumble disbanded in 1982. Mayes died of AIDS on 12 July 1995 in London, at the age of 50.

== Discography ==
- Fumble (September 1972; Sovereign. SVNA 7254)
- Poetry in Lotion (December 1974; RCA Victor. SF 8403)
- Rumble With Fumble (The Official Bootleg) (1979; Rumble Records. CP114)
- It's Only A Rock'n'Roll Game (1982; EMI Electrola. 1C 064-46 547. Germany)
