= George Rowell (historian) =

George Rowell (1923 – 1 November 2001) was a British theatre historian, lecturer and authority on the 19th century. His specialisms included Victorian melodrama and the theatre of Henry Irving, W. S. Gilbert, Oscar Wilde and Arthur Wing Pinero.

== Biography ==
Rowell lectured in drama at Bristol University from around 1950, joining a fledgling department that consisted of Glynne Wickham, George W. Brandt and John Lavender. Bristol became the first British University to offer Drama as a degree subject—as distinct from English—when the visionary Vice-Chancellor, Sir Philip Morris, appointed Wickham (then 26) as the first junior academic in Drama in 1947. As part of this department—a team dubbed 'the four musketeers' by Wickham—Rowell played a key part in defining how drama would be taught as a discipline. They developed a distinctive conception of their subject now largely accepted: of drama as a 'laboratory' subject, involving practice as well as library study, and indeed by 1951 they had their own studio space—a converted squash court. In keeping with this ethos, Brandt did some acting and directed several television, radio and film as well as stage, productions; Rowell, in collaboration with Kenneth Mobbs of Bristol Opera House, adapted and revised W. S. Gilbert's farce Engaged (1877), converting it into a comic opera in 1962. The department can also lay claim to a piece of theatrical history; they hosted the premiere of Harold Pinter's first play, The Room, in May 1957, performed in that former squash court of a theatre, The Drama Studio.

During his time at Bristol, Rowell became a world expert on Victorian theatre, in the process building up a personal collection on the subject (now part of the University's Theatre Collection, as well as the National Archives) and being appointed as Special Lecturer in drama. He published extensively upon his specialist area, as the bibliography below attests; of particular worth to students and scholars are his collections of dramatic texts, each meticulously contextualised and introduced. As well as collections of Arthur Wing Pinero and W. S. Gilbert's works, he compiled many rare and important plays and critical articles. His seminal compendium, Nineteenth Century Plays (1953), contains ten plays spanning 1829–90, juxtaposing 'blood and thunder' barnstormers like C. H. Hazlewood's Lady Audley's Secret (1863) and Leopold Lewis's The Bells (1871) with the social satire of Edward Bulwer-Lytton's Money (1840) and James Albery's Two Roses (1870). His volume of Victorian Dramatic Criticism (1971) contains a wealth of articles, essays and reviews on all aspects of nineteenth century theatre—pantomime, melodrama, Ibsen, the 1890s—including writings from William Hazlitt, Charles Lamb, William Archer, Henry James and George Bernard Shaw. Further works included a history of provincial theatres in Britain and a study of the Old Vic, London's last remaining Georgian theatre.

George Rowell died on 1 November 2001, leaving a widow, Nancy, who died in December 2004.

== Works ==
- Rowell, G. (1953) Nineteenth Century Plays. Oxford: The World's Classics.
- Rowell, G. (1956) The Victorian Theatre 1792-1914: A Survey. Oxford: Oxford University Press.
- Rowell, G. & Mobbs, K. (1962) Engaged! or Cheviot's Choice. A comic opera in three acts. Written by W. S. Gilbert. Chappell & Co.
- Rowell, G. (ed.) (1968) Late Victorian plays, 1890-1914 (World's Classics). Oxford: Oxford University Press.
- Rowell, G. (ed.) (1971) Victorian Dramatic Criticism. London: Methuen & Co. Ltd.
- Rowell, G. (ed.) (1972) Nineteenth Century Plays. 2nd edn. Oxford: Oxford University Press.
- Rowell, G. (1978) Queen Victoria goes to the Theatre. Elek Books Ltd.
- Rowell, G. & Jackson, A. (1984) The Repertory Movement: A History of Regional Theatre in Britain. Cambridge: Cambridge University Press.
- Rowell, G. (1982) Theatre in the Age of Irving (Drama and Theatre Studies). Rowman & Littlefield Publishing Inc.
- Rowell, G. (ed.) (1982) Plays by W. S. Gilbert: The Palace of the Truth, Sweethearts, Princess Toto, Engaged, Rosencrantz and Guildenstern (British and American Playwrights). Cambridge: Cambridge University Press.
- Rowell, G. (ed.) (1986) Plays by A. W. Pinero: The Schoolmistress, The Second Mrs Tanqueray, Trelawny of the 'Wells', The Thunderbolt (British and American Playwrights). Cambridge: Cambridge University Press.
- Rowell, G. (1987) William Terriss and Richard Prince: Two Characters in an Adelphi Melodrama. Society for Theatre Research.
- Rowell, G. (1989) 'The Drama of Wilde and Pinero' in Ford, B. (ed.) The Later Victorian Age. Cambridge: Cambridge University Press.
- Rowell, G. (1993) The Old Vic Theatre: A History. Cambridge: Cambridge University Press.
