= Bristol Old Vic silver tickets =

Historic theatre tickets, giving unlimited free entry to performances

- The front of one of the tokens. Text reads "King Street, Bristol Theatre. May 30 1766"
- Material: Silver
- Writing: English
- Created: 1766, Bristol
- Present location: University of Bristol Theatre Collection (nine tokens), private collections, and unknown

The Bristol Old Vic silver tickets (also known as Bristol Old Vic theatre tokens) are silver tokens that were issued by the Bristol Old Vic theatre, allowing their owners unlimited free entry to shows. Fifty tickets were minted, and given to shareholders who each raised £50 to fund the construction of the theatre in 1766.

== Silver tickets ==
Rear of one of the silver tokens, reading "No. 26. The Proprietor of this Ticket is Entitled to the Sight of Every Performance to be Exhibited in this House."

Fifty original tickets were minted, made from silver in 1766, and given to local proprietors who each gave the theatre £50 towards construction costs. Amongst the proprietors, there were local councillors, at least three Quakers, and two future Members of Parliament. At the time of construction the theatre was known as the King Street, Bristol Theatre, as it did not have a Royal License to operate as a theatre under the Licensing Act 1737, and that is the name displayed on the tickets. Once a license was obtained in 1778, the theatre was renamed to the "Theatre Royal".

The tickets read "No. {ticket number}. The Proprietor of this Ticket is Entitled to the Sight of Every Performance to be Exhibited in this House." The owners of the tickets insisted that they would be allowed to loan or sell the tickets, transferring the right to free attendance to the new ticket holder. This made it difficult for the theatre to track who should be allowed to see performances for free, and led to counterfeit tokens being produced.

== Golden tickets ==
Two special tokens, known as golden tickets or bearer tickets, were issued alongside the original silver tickets. They are similar to the other silver tickets, but are gilded in gold, unnumbered, and have 'bearer' written in place of 'proprietor'. They were given to cabinet maker Edward Crump and his wife Ann Crump, for "the great trouble and expense" they had gone through to convince the landowners to allow the construction of the theatre.

== Surviving tickets ==
Historians know of twenty surviving silver tickets, and one gold ticket. However, very few have even been put up for auction.

List of known surviving tickets
Ticket number	Status
No. 2	University of Bristol Theatre Collection
No. 19	Bristol Archives, on loan for display at the M Shed
No. 26	Photographed by the Bristol City Council Museum
No. 35	Sold at auction in 2023
No. 37	Bristol Archives
Unnumbered golden ticket	University of Bristol Theatre Collection

=== University of Bristol Theatre Collection ===
In 2015, four tickets, including one of the golden tickets, were donated to the University of Bristol Theatre Collection. These were donated by Geraldine Menez, granddaughter of Henry Augustine Forse, who was involved in the process of remodelling the theatre in 1902. These were added to five silver tickets already in the university collection.

=== Auction of token no. 35 ===
On 28 October 2023 one of the tokens, numbered 35, was auctioned off at Henry Aldridge & Sons auction house in Devizes, Wiltshire. Initial estimates put the value between £1,500 and £2,500, but it sold for £9,200.

== 250th anniversary tickets ==
In 2016, to mark the 250th anniversary of the theatre, new silver tickets were minted. They were sold for £50,000 each, to raise funds to redevelop the theatre.
