= Lincoln College, Lincolnshire =

Further and higher education school in Lincoln, England

Lincoln College

Location
- Monks Road; Lincoln, Lincolnshire, LN2 5HQ; England; 53°13′52″N 0°32′07″W

Information
- Type: College of Further and Higher Education
- Established: 1932
- Local authority: Lincolnshire
- Department for Education URN: 130762 Tables
- Ofsted: Reports
- Chief Executive: Mark Locking
- Age: 15+
- Enrolment: 13,318 (Feb 2011)
- Website: http://www.lincolncollege.ac.uk/

Lincoln College is a predominantly further education college based in the City of Lincoln, England.

The college's main site is on Monks Road (B1308), specifically to the north, and to the south of Lindum Hill (A15). It was formerly known as the Lincoln College of Technology and was one of the sites for North Lincolnshire College.

== Satellite sites ==
The college has satellite sites in Gainsborough, and also in Newark-on-Trent in Nottinghamshire (since merging with the former Newark and Sherwood College in 2007). These two branch sites are branded as Gainsborough College and Newark College respectively.

More than 11,000 students are enrolled across the three sites, making it one of the largest educational establishments in the county of Lincolnshire. The college closed its small fourth campus in Louth, Lincolnshire in 2005.

=== Gainsborough ===
The site was known as Gainsborough College of Further Education, on Morton Terrace. The County Technical College was built in 1938, along with a new grammar school. The land was bought by Lincolnshire County Council from Sir Hickman Beckett Bacon, High Sheriff of Lincolnshire in 1887. It opened in June 1941. At a meeting of Lincolnshire County Council, on Tuesday 17 June 1975, the name was changed from County Technical College.

The Secretary of State for Education, Sir Keith Joseph, visited the college and the grammar schools on Friday 18 June 1982, after visiting Lincoln. He had a buffet lunch prepared by college catering students. Fred Rickard also attended, the director of education for Lincolnshire.

Fred Rickard died in May 2010, and had joined Lindsey County Council in 1967, having taught in Leicestershire schools until 1970, becoming director of education in 1978, when aged 50; he was educated at Devonport High School for Boys and the University of Leicester.

The merger with Lincoln was proposed in September 1986, due to the lower local birth rate and fewer 16 year olds by the early 1990s. Although staff at Gainsborough thought this would mean the closure of the premises, the new combined site started on 1 September 1987.

== History ==
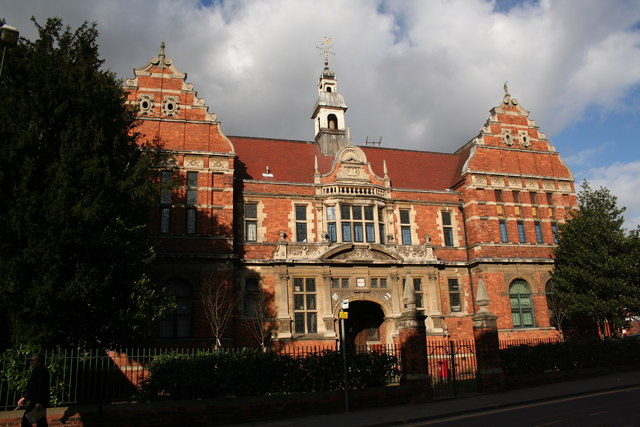
The buildings of the City School, a former grammar school on Monks Road, now the Gibney Building part of the college built in 1885 as the School of Science and Art

The college was earlier known as Lincoln Technical College and built on Cathedral Street in 1932.

It became Lincoln College of Technology in the early 1970s, then administered by the City of Lincoln Education Committee. In the mid-1980s the college piloted the Technician Engineering Scholarship Scheme (TESS), funded by the Engineering Industry Training Board, a scheme for women.

Two new blocks were added between 1976 and 1978, for business and management studies.

North Lincolnshire College (known as NLC from 1989) was created on 1 September 1987 by Lincolnshire County Council from combining the Lincoln site with Gainsborough College of Further Education and part of the Louth Further Education Centre.

It previously had its headquarters on Cathedral Street until 1993. In the early 1990s it offered degrees and HNDs in Business Studies, Electronics, and Computer Studies in conjunction with Nottingham Trent University, becoming an associate college in 1994. In 1997 the Principal, Allan Crease, in a speech to the Association of Colleges criticised the means of funding from the Further Education Funding Council for England (FEFC), where money was allocated by numbers at the college, and staff received less pay than those at school.

In the late 1990s the University of Lincoln was being developed, subsuming Lincoln College of Art, and offered similar courses to the college, but the university was not fully built until the mid-2000s. In the late 1990s the college had a student population of around 15,000 and over 20,000 by 2001.

It soon after changed its name to Lincoln College, not least because North Lincolnshire was an area not covered by the college. From 2010 it was funded by the East Midlands LSC, based in Leicester, although the local LSC office was based nearby on Kingsley Road in North Hykeham.

=== Principals ===
- Geoffrey Church, from the early 1960s until 1981
- In around October 1988, the college principal 53-year-old Arthur Ridings, of Southrey, became Director of Education for Lincolnshire. Fred Rickard had left in May 1985 as the county Director of Education, being replaced by Derek Esp, former deputy director for Somerset, who retired in March 1988, being briefly replaced by his deputy David Chrisp, of Wellingore. Mr Ridings had been principal of Beeston College of Further Education from 1973, then principal of Lincoln College of Technology for five years from 1981, then headed the team that former North Lincolnshire College. He attended Leigh Grammar School, in Lancashire where he was the county triple jump champion, and studied Maths and Physics at the University of Nottingham, where he captained the athletics team, and played rugby for the university and the English Universities team. Mr Ridings left the county council at the end of April 1994, to help launch the new University College of Lincolnshire, with Nottingham Trent University. The new university was planned to become independent in 2000, with around 5000 students. He moved to Spridlington in 1994, when at the time his wife was head of the college in Louth. Arthur Ridings was replaced as county director of education in 1994 by Norman Riches, who stayed until March 2000.

== Buildings ==
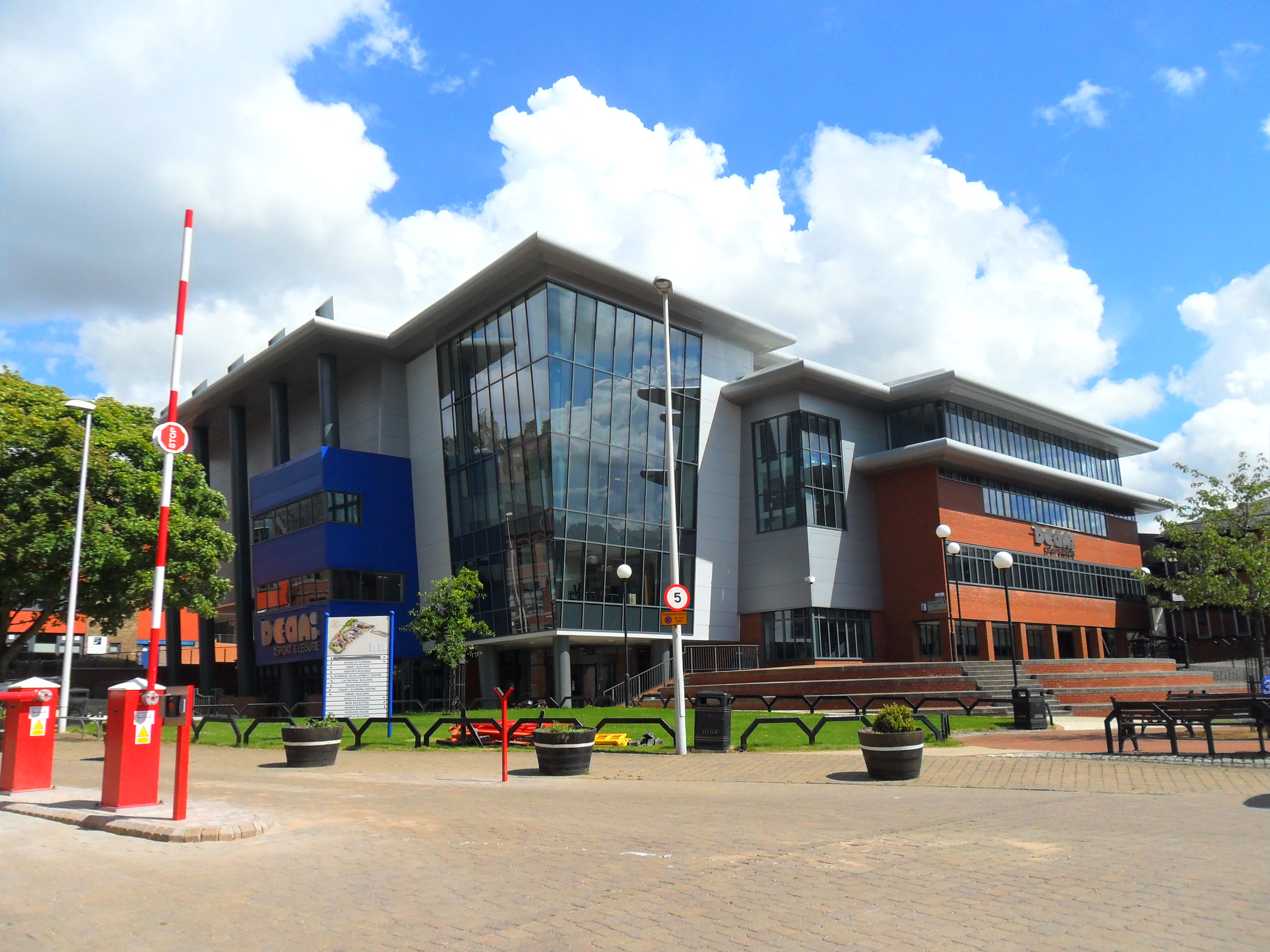
The new Deans Sport & Leisure centre

Eight different buildings make up Lincoln College's main site, including the Abbey, Gibney, Sessions, Bishops and Cathedral Buildings. Bishops Building, located to the back of the site, contains a technology school. This has electronics courses including BTEC National Diploma Electrical and Electronic Engineering course. Art and Creative course are housed in a building off campus on Christ Hospital Terrace under the same name as the street.

=== City of Lincoln School ===
Part of the college, the Gibney Building, is the site of the former City School, previously the Lincoln Technical School, which for a time became the headquarters of the Lincoln Archaeological Trust in the early 1970s.

From November 1940, boys from the Bablake School in Coventry were evacuated to the City of Lincoln School for two and a half years. Girls from Bablake School were evacuated to South Park High School for Girls (now Priory LSST). Roundhay Grammar School had been evacuated to Lincoln School (now LCHS) on Wragby Road.

The school had around 600 boys in the 1960s. Former members of this school have their City School Lincoln Association.

== Curriculum ==
The automotive technology program at Lincoln College includes training in fuel systems, electrical systems, driving diagnostics and transmissions, and techniques to install, repair and maintain vehicles. There are higher education courses in Computing Higher National Diplomas in Internet and Computer Science & NVQ in Logistics Operations Management. Instructors are certified through the Automotive Service of Excellence (ASE). areas. The college has higher education links with universities including the University of Lincoln and Nottingham Trent University.

== Alumni ==
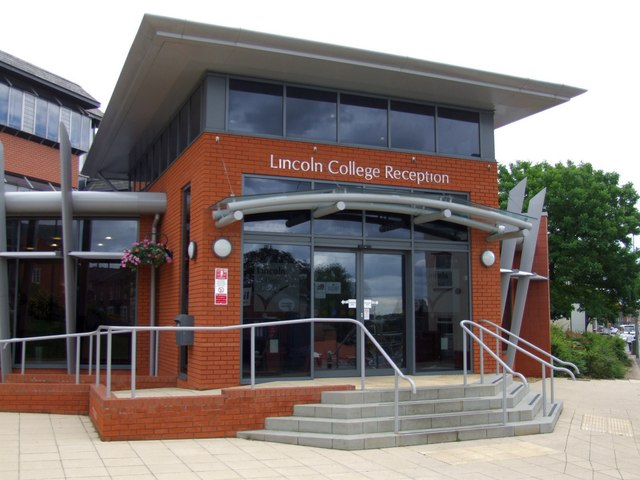
Reception entrance

- Jason Bradbury, host of The Gadget Show
- Karen Lee, former MP for Lincoln

=== City Grammar School ===
- Sir Francis Hill, chancellor from 1972 to 1978 of the University of Nottingham 1900–1907
- Brig. Harry Hopthrow, director from 1943 to 1945 of Fortifications and Works of the War Office 1908–1915
- Sir Denis Follows, Chairman of the British Olympic Association from 1977 to 1983 and president from 1930 to 1932 of the National Union of Students 1918–1923
- Prof Hermann Arthur Jahn, Professor of Applied Mathematics from 1949 to 1972 at the University of Southampton, and who with Edward Teller discovered the Jahn–Teller effect 1908–1915
- Frank Rose, chemist, Research Manager from 1954 to 1971 of the Pharmaceutical Division of ICI where he developed sulphamerazine, and developed the anti-malaria drug Paludrine during the war 1920–1927
- Prof John Harris, zoologist and Vice Chancellor from 1966 to 1968 of the University of Bristol 1922–1929
- Frank Scrimshaw, Director General of Electronics R&D from 1967 to 1972 at the Ministry of Technology 1929–1936
- Dr Frank Panton, director of part of the UK's Polaris missile project, and director from 1980 to 1983 of the Royal Armament Research and Development Establishment 1934–1941
- Commander John Wilson, former head in the 1970s of the Metropolitan Police's Special Branch 1938–1945 (his father was the headmaster)
- Prof Ronald Bell, Director-General of ADAS from 1984 to 1989 and Chief Scientific Advisor of MAFF, and president from 1985 to 1989 of the British Crop Production Council, and director from 1977 to 1984 of the National Institute of Agricultural Engineering (NIAE, which closed in 2006) at Silsoe 1941–1948
- Tony Worthington, Labour MP from 1987 to 2005 for Clydebank and Milngavie 1953–1960
- Prof David Fowler, Science Director since 2003 of Biogeochemistry at the Centre for Ecology and Hydrology in Edinburgh 1961–1968
- Kevin Cox, former President of the biotechnology company Avecia 1969–1974

== See also ==
- North Lindsey College
