= Bristol Old Vic =

Theatre in Bristol, England

Bristol Old Vic Theatre Company
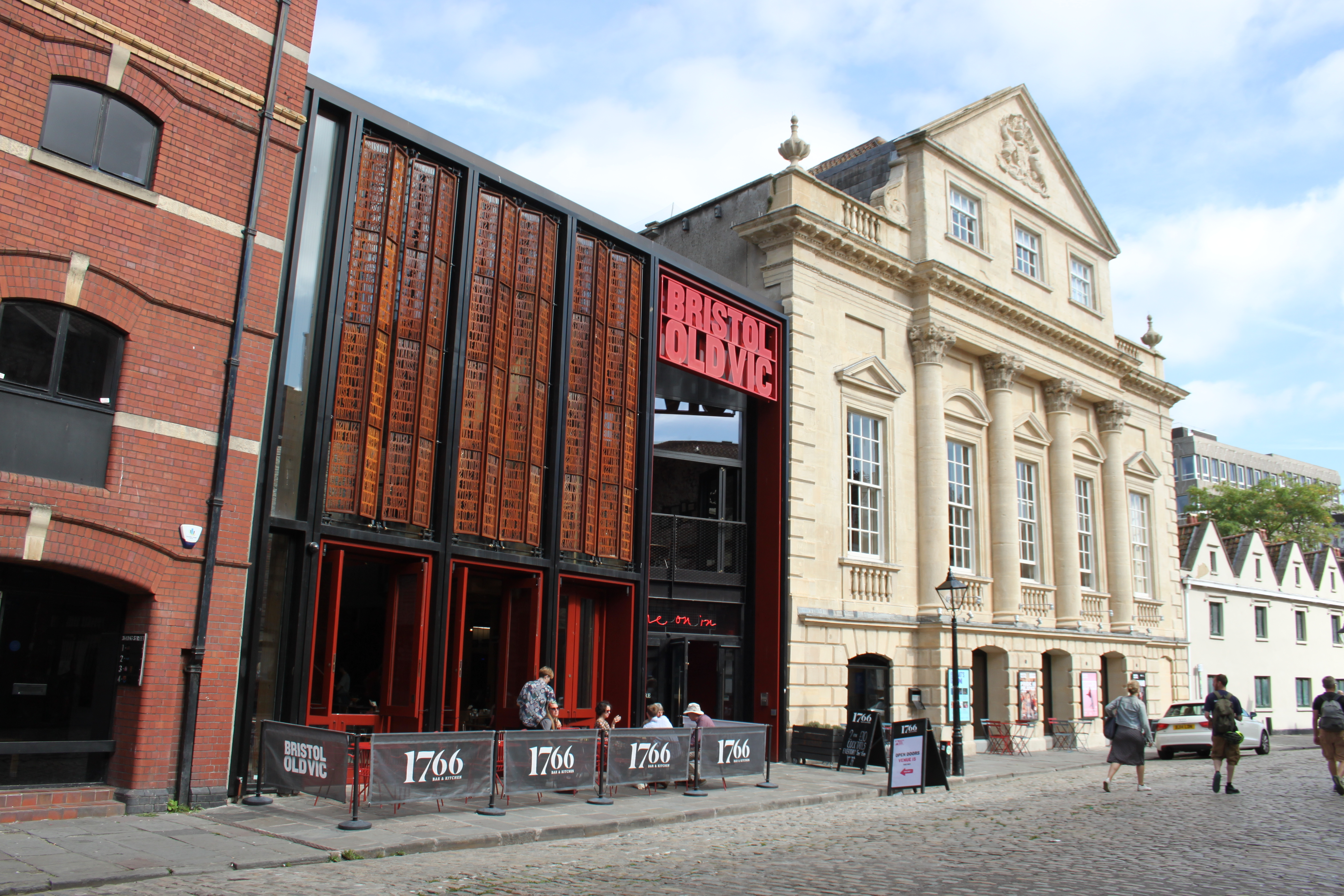
- New and old exterior in 2019
- Interactive map of Bristol Old Vic Theatre Company
- Address: King Street; BS1 4ED; Bristol; United Kingdom
- Coordinates: 51.4521°N 2.5942°W
- Owner: Trustees of the Theatre Royal
- Capacity: 540 (Theatre Royal); 188 (Weston Studio)
- Type: Repertory
- Designation: Grade I listed building

Construction
- Opened: 1766
- Rebuilt: 1970–1972; 2016–2018

Website
- Bristol Old Vic

Bristol Old Vic is a British theatre company based at the Theatre Royal, Bristol. The present company was established in 1946 as an offshoot of the Old Vic in London. It is associated with the Bristol Old Vic Theatre School, which became a financially independent organisation in the 1990s. Bristol Old Vic runs a Young Company for those aged 7–25.

The Theatre Royal, the oldest continually-operating theatre in the English-speaking world, was built between 1764 and 1766 on King Street in Bristol. The Coopers' Hall, built 1743–1744, was incorporated as the theatre's foyer during 1970–1972. Together, they are designated a Grade I listed building by Historic England. Daniel Day-Lewis called it "the most beautiful theatre in England."

In 2012, the theatre complex completed the first phase of a £19 million refurbishment, increasing the seating capacity and providing up to ten flexible performance spaces. Besides the main Theatre Royal auditorium, the complex includes the Studio theatre and the Side Stage, Paint Shop and Basement performance areas. Whilst the theatre was closed, the company continued to present work in the Studio and Basement spaces, as well as at other sites around Bristol. The Theatre Royal re-opened in 2012 with Wild Oats.

== History of the theatre ==
The theatre is situated on King Street, a few yards from the Floating Harbour. From 1972 until 2016, the public entrance was through the Coopers' Hall, the earliest surviving building on the site. The Coopers' Hall was built in 1744 for the Coopers' Company, the guild of coopers in Bristol, by architect William Halfpenny. It has a "debased Palladian" façade with four Corinthian columns. It only remained in the hands of the Coopers until 1785, subsequently becoming a public assembly room, a wine warehouse, a Baptist chapel and eventually a fruit and vegetable warehouse.

The theatre was built between 1764 and 1766. The design of the auditorium has traditionally been taken to have been based, with some variations, on that of the Theatre Royal, Drury Lane in London. Although Bristol architect Thomas Paty supervised construction, the theatre was built to designs by James Saunders, David Garrick's carpenter at Drury Lane. Saunders had provided drawings for the theatre in Richmond, Surrey, built in 1765. A long section (1790, at Harvard University Theatre Collection) and a survey plan (1842, at the Local Studies Library) of the Richmond theatre show close similarities with the Bristol theatre in the proportions and in the relationship between the actors on stage and the spectators surrounding them on three sides. The site chosen was Rackhay Yard, a roughly rectangular empty site behind a row of medieval houses and to one side of the Coopers' Hall. Two (and possibly three) new passageways built through the ground floor of the houses fronting King Street gave access to Rackhay Yard and the "New Theatre" inside it.

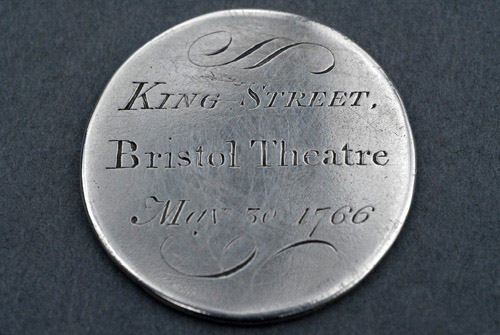
One of fifty silver tokens issued to the subscribers who funded the building of the Theatre Royal Bristol. The tokens granted free entry to their proprietors to every performance at the Theatre Royal Bristol. Image from University of Bristol Theatre Collection.

In 1764, forty investors each contributed £50 (or one share) towards the creation of the theatre, many of whom were involved in the Atlantic slave trade. Fifty numbered silver tickets were issued to shareholders, granting them unlimited free access to shows at the theatre, in return for each of them donating £50 to fund its construction. Two special golden tickets were issued to cabinet maker Edward Crump and his wife Ann Crump, for "the great trouble and expense" they had gone to convince the landowners to allow the construction of the theatre.

The theatre opened on 30 May 1766 with a performance which included a prologue and epilogue given by David Garrick. As the proprietors were not able to obtain a royal licence, productions were announced as "a concert with a specimen of rhetorick" to evade the restrictions imposed on theatres by the Licensing Act 1737. This ruse was soon abandoned, but a production in the neighbouring Coopers' Hall in 1773 did fall foul of this law.

Bristol Theatre Act 1778
- Act of Parliament
- Parliament of Great Britain
- Long title: An Act to enable His Majesty to License a Theatre in the City of Bristol.
- Citation: 18 Geo. 3. c. 8
- Territorial extent: Great Britain

Dates
- Royal assent: 6 March 1778
- Commencement: 20 November 1777 (Note: Start of session.)
- Repealed: 30 July 1948
Other legislation
Repealed by	Statute Law Revision Act 1948

Status: Repealed

Text of statute as originally enacted

Legal concerns were alleviated when the royal letters patent were eventually granted following the passing of the Bristol Theatre Act 1778 (18 Geo. 3. c. 8), and the theatre became a patent theatre and took up the name "Theatre Royal". At this time the theatre also started opening for the winter season, and a joint company was established to perform at both the Bath Theatre Royal and in Bristol, featuring performers such as Sarah Siddons, whose ghost, according to legend, haunts the Bristol theatre. The auditorium was rebuilt with a new sloping ceiling and gallery in 1800.

From 1819 the theatre was managed by William M'Cready the elder, with little success, and then, following his death in 1834 by his widow, the actress Sarah M'Cready. Following her death in 1853 the M'Creadys' son-in-law James Chute took over. However, he became overcommitted, running the Bath Theatre Royal, the Theatre Royal Bristol and the new Prince's Theatre, opened in 1867. In 1881 the lease on the theatre was taken up by popular actor George Melville, who invested heavily in it, carrying out heavy refurbishment. Despite the popularity of his pantomime performances, he struggled to make a profit and gave up the lease in 1893. Failures to invest in the decaying fabric of the building in the late nineteenth century and early twentieth century, legal battles between the proprietors and the managers, as well as the shifting nature of popular entertainment, saw the theatre struggle up to the time it was taken over by the Old Vic in 1943.

Historic documents from the history of the Theatre Royal and Bristol Old Vic can be found at Bristol Archives and University of Bristol Theatre Collection.

== Formation of the Bristol Old Vic ==
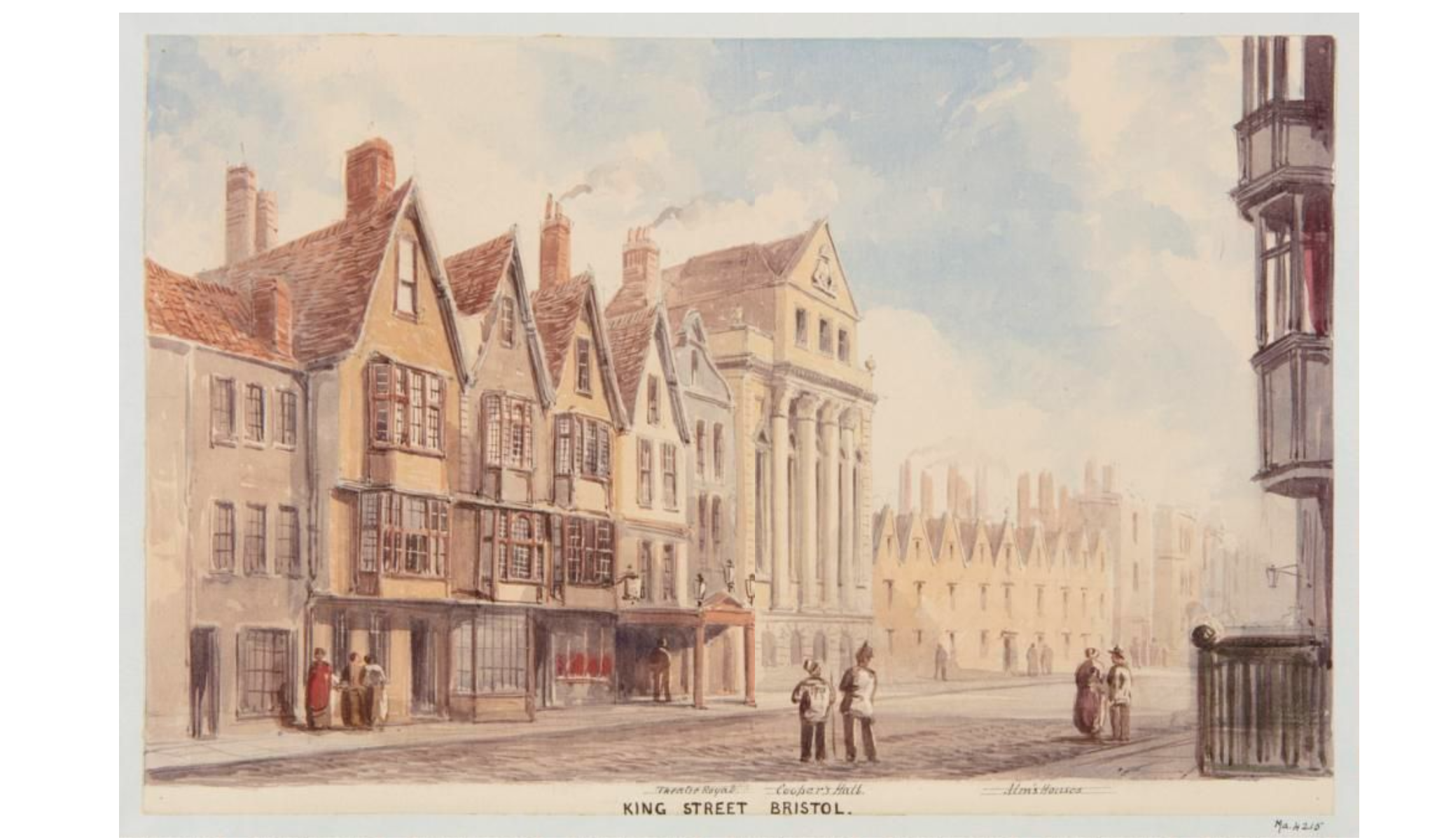
Entrance to the theatre, King Street, 1876

In 1942, the lease owners put the building up for sale. The sale was perceived as a possible loss of the building as a theatre and a public appeal was mounted to preserve its use, and as a result a new Trust was established to buy the building. The Council for the Encouragement of Music and the Arts (CEMA) leased the building from the Trust and in 1946 CEMA's successor, the Arts Council, arranged for a company from the London Old Vic to staff it, thus forming the Bristol Old Vic.

Early members of the company included Peter O'Toole (making his first appearance in Major Barbara in 1956), John Neville, Timothy West, Barbara Leigh-Hunt and Dorothy Tutin. The first artistic director was Hugh Hunt.

An early triumph for the Bristol Old Vic occurred when the 1954 première production of Salad Days transferred to the West End and became the longest-running musical on the London stage at that time. The Arts Council remained involved until 1963 when their role was taken over by the City Council. In the same year, the London Old Vic was disbanded and the Bristol company became fully independent. The Bristol Old Vic also put plays on in the council-owned Little Theatre (now the Lantern Hall, part of Bristol Beacon) from then until 1980.

A new theatre complex, designed by Peter Moro, was completed in 1972. The 1903 entrance building was demolished, as were a number of surrounding buildings and, more controversially, the stage area of the 1766 theatre. A new stage and fly tower were built along with technical facilities and offices. The 150-seat New Vic studio theatre (later known as the Studio) was built in place of the old entrance, and the Coopers' Hall provided the theatre with the grand façade and foyer area it had previously lacked.

Throughout the 1970s and 1980s, Bristol Old Vic productions were well received both locally and on tour, but by the late 1980s faced significant underfunding. A revival under the leadership of Andrew (Andy) Hay brought an increase in audience numbers; there followed a new Arts Council funding package, and in 2003 the appointment of joint artistic directors David Farr and Simon Reade. They briefly branded the organisation the "new bristol old vic".

In 2005, Reade became the sole artistic director. Artistic highlights during these times included the production of A. C. H. Smith's Up The Feeder, Down the Mouth and Back Again during Andy Hay's tenure, and some well-received Shakespeare productions under David Farr and Simon Reade.

== Refurbishment ==
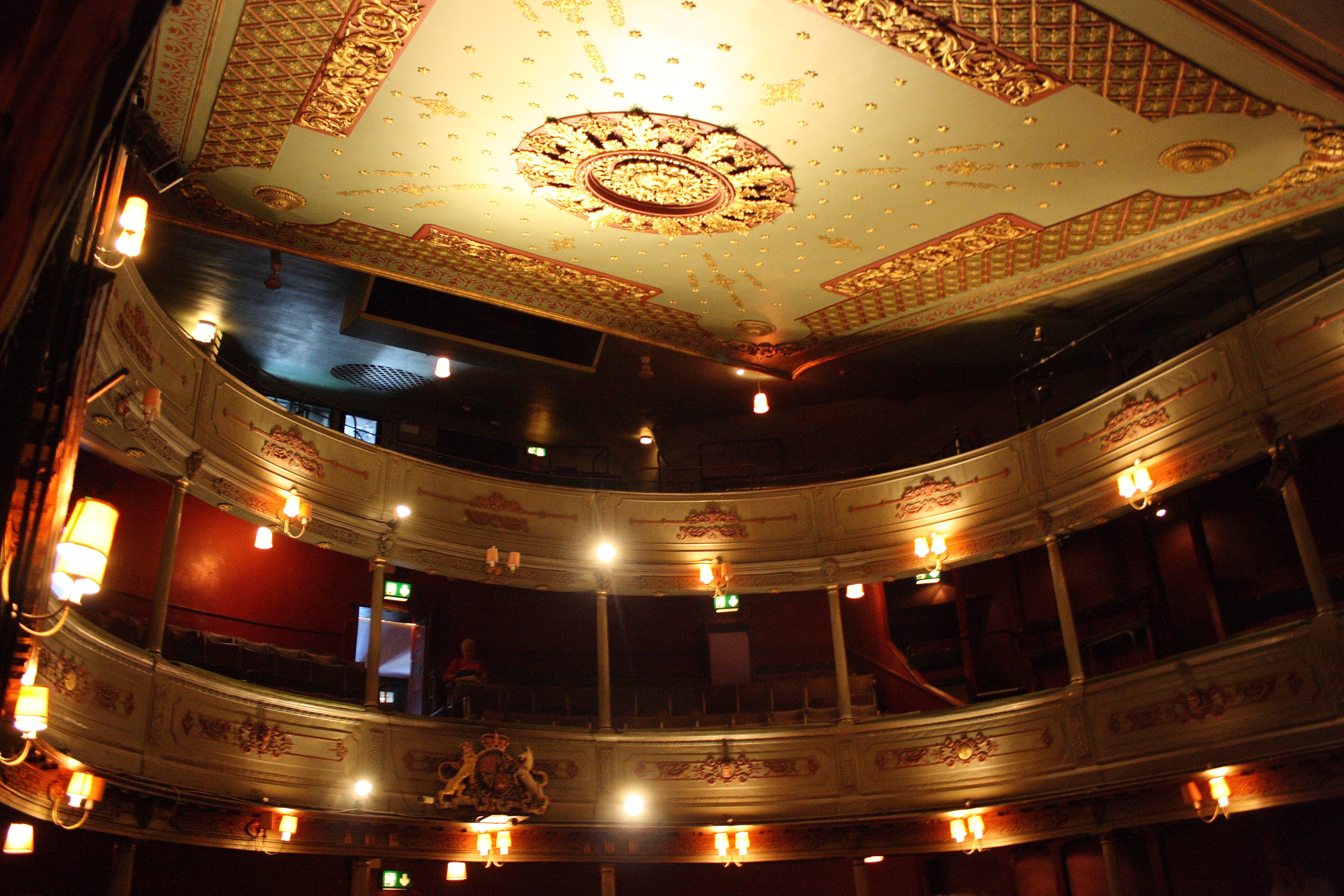
Interior of the main theatre, 2008

In July 2007, the board of trustees took the controversial decision to close the theatre for refurbishment. Many members of the theatre profession feared for the future of the Old Vic. Following several public meetings in the winter of 2007/2008, a newly formed board of trustees appointed Dick Penny, the director of the Watershed Media Centre as executive chairman.

In February 2009, the company announced that Tom Morris, at that time an associate director at the Royal National Theatre and formerly artistic director at Battersea Arts Centre, had been appointed as artistic director. Emma Stenning, who had previously worked with Tom Morris at BAC, became executive director.

In October 2010, there was a merger of the Old Vic and the Theatre Royal Bristol Trust, into a combined charity to be chaired by Laura Marshall, the managing director of Icon Films.

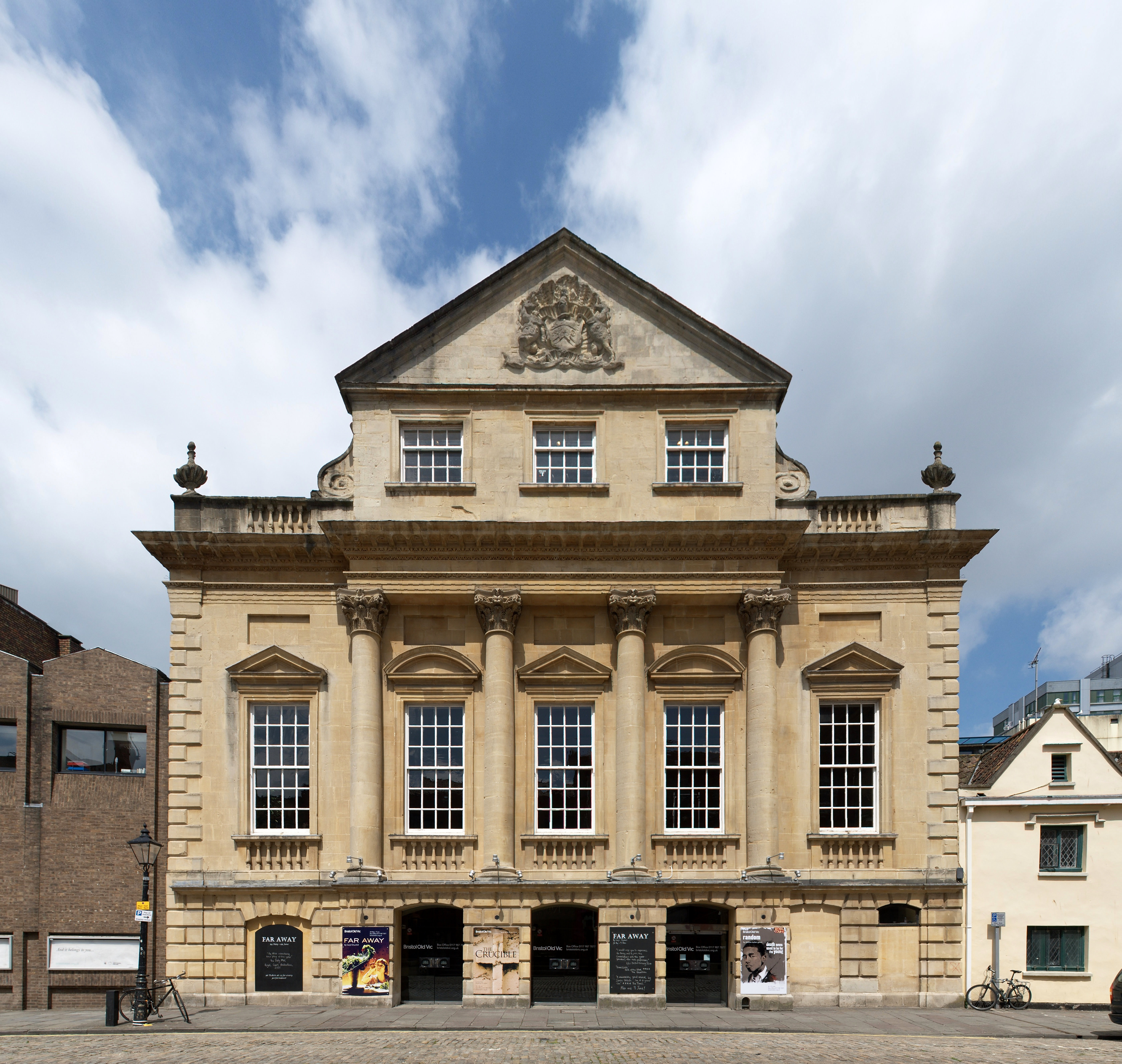
The Coopers' Hall served as the theatre's entrance from 1972 to 2016

A fundraising campaign for the £19 million planned refurbishment was assisted by appearances from, among others, Richard Briers, Stephanie Cole, Judi Dench, Prunella Scales, Timothy West and Patrick Stewart. £5.3 million was provided by the Arts Council. During the closure the company staged productions in the Studio theatre, the Basement and in other locations around Bristol, including Sally Cookson's adaptation of Treasure Island on King Street in summer 2011 and Melly Still's revival of Coram Boy at the Colston Hall at Christmas 2011.

The plan was for a flexible theatre complex, where up to ten areas are available for performance. Tom Morris has cited as inspiration the Théâtre des Bouffes du Nord in Paris. The main auditorium gained an optional thrust stage, and an increase in seating to 540. The Side Stage area was redeveloped, with additional capacity of 250, creating the option of a separate second auditorium. Other spaces redeveloped as performance areas included the Paint Shop and the rehearsal room. The Theatre Royal re-opened in September 2012, with Wild Oats.

A further round of redevelopment, designed by architects Haworth Tompkins, was undertaken between June 2016 and September 2018. The street side of the 1970s Peter Moro building, containing the Studio theatre (originally the New Vic), was demolished and replaced by a new foyer with bar and box office, which makes a feature of the previously hidden theatre walls. The Coopers' Hall was adapted to house new performance and event spaces, including a studio theatre in the barrel vaults in its basement.

== Touring ==
The Bristol Old Vic has a long history of taking productions on tour both within the United Kingdom and overseas. Production which have toured include Hamlet, Arms and the Man and A Man for All Seasons to Ceylon and Pakistan in 1962–63; Hamlet and Measure for Measure to America, Holland and Belgium in 1966–67 and Man and Superman to the June Schauspielhaus Festival in Zurich, 1958. The company has also made frequent visits to the Edinburgh Festival and productions have toured to the Theatre Royal Bath, Oxford Playhouse, Royal Court Theatre, London and the Young Vic, London amongst others. Co-productions have taken Bristol Old Vic plays to most of Britain's major theatres. Bristol Old Vic has co-produced with companies such as Kneehigh Theatre, the Royal National Theatre, West Yorkshire Playhouse and other regional theatres and companies across the UK.

Tom Morris’ production of Swallows and Amazons transferred to the Vaudeville Theatre in London's West End followed by a major UK tour. Simon Godwin's production of Brian Friel's Faith Healer is playing in the 2012 Hong Kong Arts Festival. Other recent touring productions include the Bristol Old Vic/Shakespeare at the Tobacco Factory co-production of Uncle Vanya.

Bristol Old Vic's Ferment artist development strand also sees work developed at the theatre touring across the UK and internationally.

== Artistic directors of the Bristol Old Vic ==
Name	Period	Notable productions
Hugh Hunt	1946–1949	The Beaux' Stratagem, The Playboy of the Western World, An Inspector Calls, Romeo and Juliet
Allan Davis	1950	Arms and the Man, Julius Caesar
Denis Carey	1950–1954	The Merry Wives of Windsor, Macbeth, An Italian Straw Hat, The Alchemist
John Moody	1954–1959	The Crucible, The Cherry Orchard, Uncle Vanya, The Recruiting Officer, As You Like It
John Hale	1959–1962	The Clandestine Marriage, A Taste of Honey, Rhinoceros, Richard II
Val May	1962–1975	Brand, The Killing of Sister George, Hamlet, The Italian Girl, Uncle Vanya
Richard Cottrell	1975–1980	The National Health, Hedda Gabler, As You Like It, A Doll's House, A Midsummer Night's Dream
John David	1980–1986	Judy, King Lear, Wild Oats, Arturo Ui, The Tempest
Leon Rubin	1986–1987	The Doctor's Dilemma
Paul Unwin	1987–1991	The Man Who Had All the Luck, Hamlet, The Master Builder
Andy Hay	1991–2002	Blue Remembered Hills, The Duchess of Malfi, The Hairy Ape, The Rise and Fall of Little Voice, Marat/Sade, A Streetcar Named Desire
David Farr and Simon Reade	2003–2005	Loot (Farr), The Odyssey (Farr), Private Peaceful (Reade)
Simon Reade	2005–2007	The Birthday Party
Tom Morris	2009–2022	Juliet and Her Romeo, Swallows and Amazons, and The Crucible
Nancy Medina	2023–present	Choir Boy, A Good House, The Beautiful Future is Coming

== Bristol Old Vic Theatre School ==
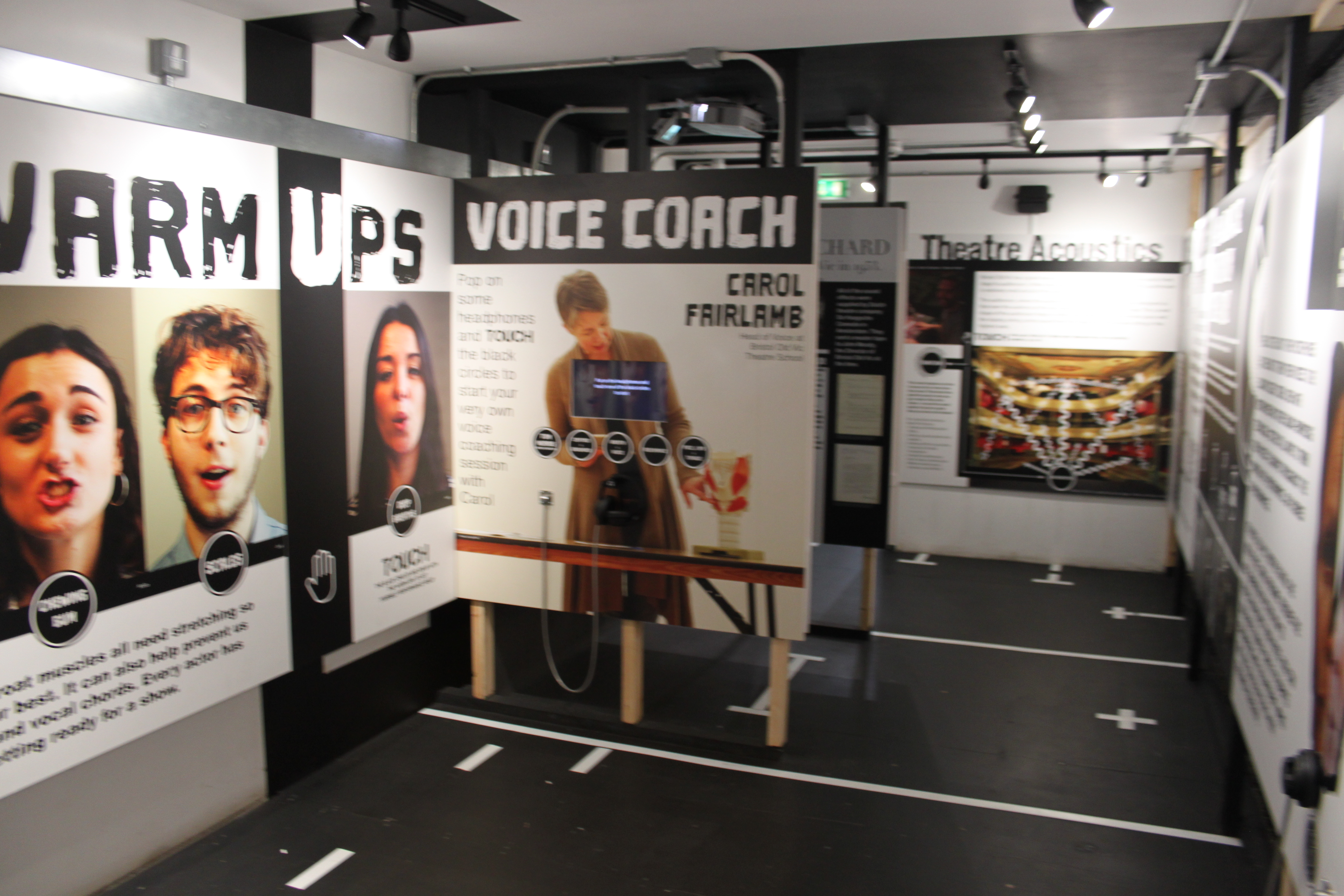
Noises Off exhibition of techniques with theatre school students

The Bristol Old Vic Theatre School, opened by Laurence Olivier in 1946, is an affiliate of the Conservatoire for Dance and Drama, an organisation securing the highest standards of training in the performing arts, and is an associate school of the University of the West of England. The School began life in October 1946, only eight months after the founding of its parent Bristol Old Vic Theatre Company, in a room above a fruit merchant's warehouse in the Rackhay near the stage door of the Theatre Royal. (The yard of the derelict St Nicholas School adjacent to the warehouse was still used by the company for rehearsals of crowd scenes and stage fights as late as the early 1960s, notably for John Hale's productions of Romeo and Juliet starring the Canadian actor Paul Massie and Annette Crosbie, a former student of the School, and Rostand's Cyrano de Bergerac with Peter Wyngarde. Students from the Theatre School frequently played in these crowd scenes and fights.)

The School continued in these premises until 1954 when royalties from the musical, Salad Days by Julian Slade and Dorothy Reynolds were given to the School towards the purchase and conversion of two large adjoining Victorian villas in Clifton, which remain their base today.

In 1995, that donation was formally recognised when a new custom-built dance and movement studio in the School's back garden was named the Slade/Reynolds Studio. The School provides comprehensive training courses for theatre, radio, film, and television professionals and its graduates are to be found in key positions as actors, directors, set designers, costumer designers, lighting designers and stage and company managers throughout the world.

Among the most notable of the many distinguished actors on the School's list of alumni are the Academy Award winners Daniel Day-Lewis and Jeremy Irons.

See Alumni of Bristol Old Vic Theatre School.

=== Peter O'Toole Prize ===
To coincide with their re-opening in 2012, the theatre launched an award called the Patron's Prize, which was later renamed the Peter O’Toole prize following the actor's death. The award is a six-month contract at the Bristol Old Vic offered to two graduating actors from the Bristol Old Vic Theatre School. The inaugural winners were Emily May Smith and Isaac Stanmore.

Award recipients and productions involved in
Year	Recipients	Productions
2012	Emily May Smith and Isaac Stanmore	Wild Oats, Does My Society Look Big in This? and Peter Pan
2013	Martin Bassindale and Lindsay Dukes	Great Expectations and The Little Mermaid
2014	Jonathan Charles	Juno and the Paycock
2014	Bethan Nash and Millie Corser	Swallows and Amazons

== See also ==
- Culture in Bristol
