= Chelmsford County High School for Girls =

Location
- Broomfield Road; Chelmsford, Essex, CM1 1RW; England; 51.743°N 0.4675°E

Information
- Type: Grammar Academy
- Motto: Vitai Lampada Ferimus (We carry the torch of life)
- Established: 1906
- Department for Education URN: 136412 Tables
- Ofsted: Reports
- Headteacher: Stephen Lawlor
- Age: 11 to 18
- Enrolment: 1260
- Houses: Curie (green), Grey-Thompson (blue), Hepburn (red), Stewart (yellow), Frank (purple), Angelou (navy)
- Website: http://www.cchs.co.uk/

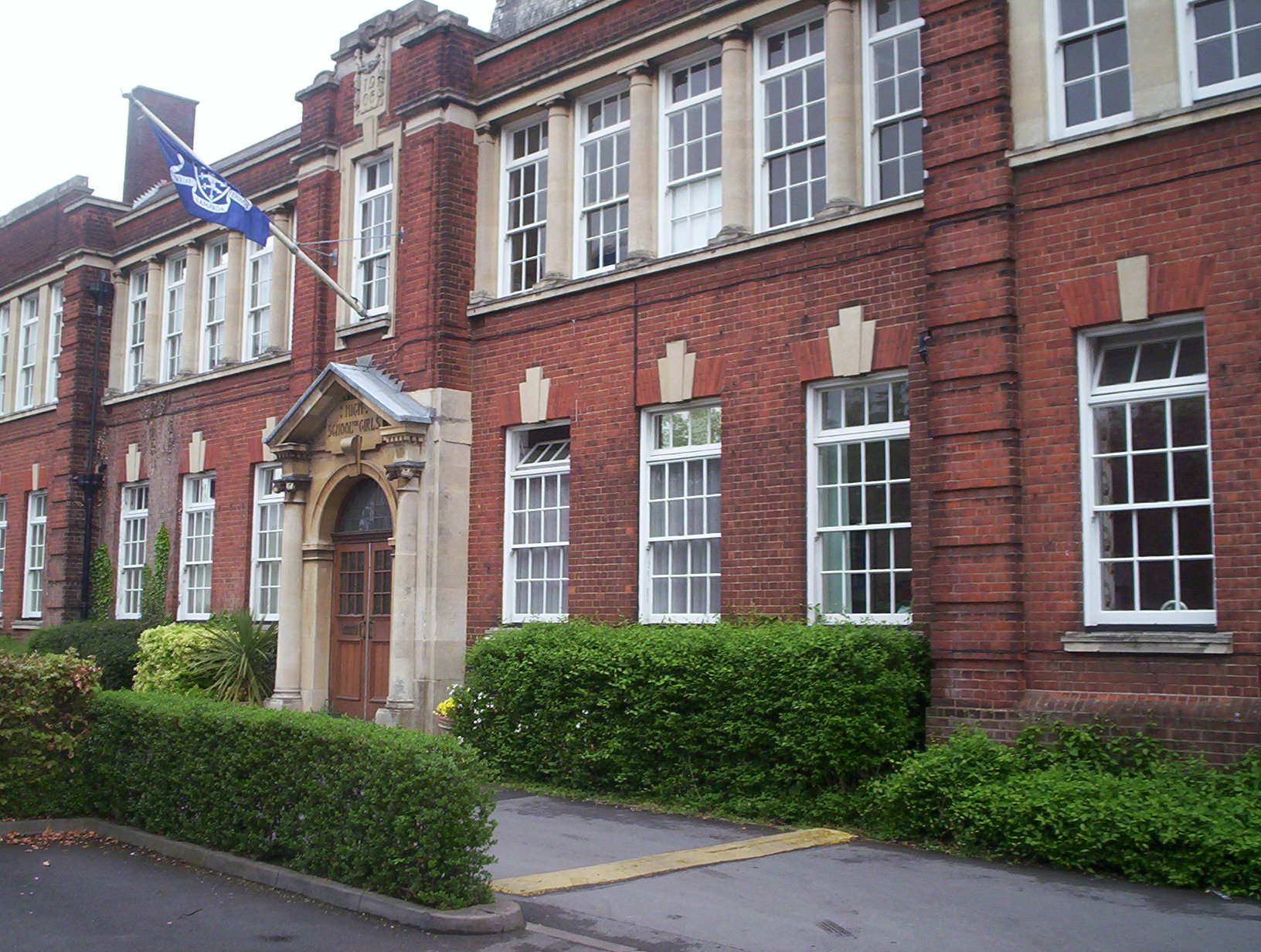
Chelmsford County High School main building

Chelmsford County High School for Girls or "CCHS", is a selective grammar school for girls aged 11–18 located in Chelmsford, Essex, England. Entrance to the school is by an academic selection test. CCHS is traditionally rated among the most consistently high achieving and academically successful secondary schools in the United Kingdom, regularly scoring top marks for both GCSE and A-level results.

== History ==
The official history of Chelmsford County High School between 1906 and 1982 is chronicled in "A History of Chelmsford County High School" by Mary Kenyon.

The school was built in 1906, and officially opened in May 1907, with its first Headmistress Mabel Vernon-Harcourt. It had 76 pupils on the school roll. Miss Edith Bancroft became the second Headmistress until she retired in 1935. A new school science building, known as Bancroft Wing, was named in her honour when it was finished in 1950. Bancroft Wing subsequently became a languages building. Miss Bancroft retired as Headmistress in 1935 and was succeeded by the school's third Headmistress, Miss Geraldine Cadbury until 1961. A science block, the Cadbury Science Building, was named after her when it opened in 1995. In 1979, Miss Phyllis Pattison retired, having been headmistress since 1961, and was replaced by Miss Anne Brooks in 1980. Miss Brooks retired in 1989 and was replaced in 1990 by Bernice McCabe, who served for seven years until 1997. In 1997, Bernice McCabe left to take up the post of Headmistress in the North London Collegiate School for Girls. She was replaced by Monica Curtis, who retired in April 2006. Mrs Glynis Howland, Deputy Head, became Acting Headteacher until the appointment of Mrs Nicole Chapman, the school´s eighth Headmistress, who took over her new post in April 2007. Mrs Chapman retired in 2019, with Mr Stephen Lawlor succeeding her as Headteacher, the first male headteacher in the history of the school.

In 1908 the school only had one male teacher – Art master, Alfred Bamford. In January 1910 the School Hostel opened in rented premises under the care of a Mrs Smylie to allow students with long journeys between home and school to stay in Chelmsford during the week. The school remained open throughout World War I, with forms being assigned "shelter" in a place away from windows or an outer wall. It also took in refugee students from Belgium and educated them. In June 1916 Winifred Picking became the School's first University success when she gained a First Class degree in the Natural Science Tripos at Girton College, Cambridge. The school's motto "Vitai lampada ferimus" or " We carry the torch of life" was chosen in 1923, which is part of the school crest. In 1936 the School Hostel shut down due to lack of viability, due to improved transport around Chelmsford. A year later, in 1937, the electric bell system was first installed. It was removed in 1999. The school remained open during World War II, though this time the school was damaged several times in air raids. Fortunately the worst raid, when nearly every window in the school was broken, occurred during a school holiday. Maintaining examination conditions during air raids was also a problem: eventually exam candidates were given their own separate shelter. Extensive building work was initiated in the 1950s and continued throughout the 1960s – in that time, the current caretaker's house, swimming pool, hall, canteen, art rooms, and library were built. In February 1962, HRH Queen Elizabeth, The Queen Mother arrived on the School grounds by helicopter to be guest of honour at the Senior Speech Day, which was held at Chelmsford Cathedral. The introduction of Technology, particularly IT, began in the 1980s. In 1992, CCHS became a Grant Maintained school with control over its own funds, and a School Bursar was employed. Margaret Thatcher, along with the local MP Simon Burns, paid a brief visit to the school on 30 March 1992. Building work continued with the development of the new school Astroturf pitch in 2004, the extension of the sixth form common room in 2005, and new music centre in 2007, which has been built in the shape of an orchestra, including a fully equipped recording studio. The building was opened in January 2008 by Dame Evelyn Glennie. In 2007 the School celebrated its Centenary, with HRH Sophie, Countess of Wessex. The school converted to academy status on 1 January 2011. In 2013 the new Languages Centre was completed, which has brought language learning into the 21st century. In 2015 and in 2020 the governors of the School voted unanimously to expand CCHS by 30 each time, increasing the intake to 180, the decision was taken in response to the ever-increasing demand for places at the School and a desire to offer the opportunity to be educated in a grammar school to even more girls.

The Old Girls’ Society was formed in 1908 by the first girls to leave the School at the end of their education, and the first Magazine was published in December 1909, and both traditions have still continued, the society has been renamed to The CCHS Alumnae. In 1925 the School House system was first set up, with each House named after a Governor of the School: Chancellor, Hulton, Pennefather, and Tancock. This was changed in 1986 to three houses, C, H, and S; in 1996 a fourth house, G, was added. In September 2015, a fifth House, F, was established, and in 2020 a sixth House was added, A. The Houses are named after influential women.

== Achievements ==
CCHS is noted for its high academic achievements. It is one of the most consistently highly performing schools in the country, and regularly appears in the top 10 of the Times School Supplement for GCSE, A Level and now IB results. The school also has an extremely high rate of attendance in comparison with other schools.

=== Specialisms ===
- CCHS gained Technology College status in 2000, although it only provides computer science as a technical subject Music College status (with English) in 2005 and Language College status in 2006. The school converted to an academy in 2011, but continues with the specialisms.

=== Awards ===
- CCHS held Beacon School status from 2001 to the award's discontinuation in 2005, as an example of successful practice with a view to sharing the practice with others.
- An Achievement Award was awarded in all three years (1999/2000 to 2001/2002) that the scheme ran. The Award was made for achieving better results than most schools in similar circumstances.
- In July 2002, CCHS was awarded with the Sportsmark Gold from Sport England for its out of hours sports provision and a broad and balanced PE curriculum. There are two levels of award: Sportsmark and Sportsmark Gold.
- In 2015, CCHS was award The Prince's Teaching Institute (PTI) Leadership Award.

== Notable former pupils ==
- Dame Margaret Anstee – UN Under-Secretary General 1987–93
- Karen Buck – MP for Regent's Park and Kensington North
- Rachel Elnaugh – entrepreneur and panellist on Dragons' Den
- Sarah Perry (née Butler) – writer
- Catharni Stern – sculptor
- Sarah Tyacke (née Jeacock) – former Keeper of Public Records and Chief executive of The National Archives, and cartographic historian
- Rosemary Vercoe (1917–2013), British costume designer
