= Glynne Wickham =

British academic (1922–2025)

Glynne William Gladstone Wickham (15 May 1922 – 27 January 2004) was a British Shakespearean and theatre scholar.

== Life ==
Wickham was born in Cape Town, and was a great-grandson of William Ewart Gladstone. He was educated at Winchester College and New College, Oxford. In 1941 he played the title role in Hamlet for the Oxford University Dramatic Society (OUDS), directed by Nevill Coghill. In 1942–1946, interrupting his undergraduate studies, he served as a navigator in the RAF. He returned to New College in 1946, and became the first postwar president of OUDS. In 1948 Coghill chose him to direct a "complex" production of a masque to celebrate the visit of the then Princess Elizabeth to Oxford.

He was awarded a DPhil in 1951 based on postgraduate research into the evolution of Elizabethan and Jacobean theatre from its medieval beginnings. This work formed the basis for his later work Early English Stages, published in five volumes between 1959 and 2002.

Appointed in 1948 to the department of drama at Bristol University (the UK's first such department), he convened a 1951 symposium on "the responsibility of universities to the theatre" to endorse the policy of studying drama in the context of theatre and a 1954 symposium on "the relationship between universities and radio, film, and television". He also did the groundwork for the university's theatre collection in 1951 (which now has museum status and is a major archive).

In 1954 he married Hesel Mudford with whom he had two sons and one daughter. Mrs Wickham died in 2025.

In 1955, he was made the department's head and in 1960 took up its chair of drama, the first such in the UK. He also helped to set up a playwriting fellowship in the department, attracting young playwrights like John Arden, and premiered Harold Pinter's first play, The Room in 1957. At his death he was the department's professor emeritus.

Wickham served as president of the American Society for Theatre Research from 1976 to 1999. In 1970 his advice was sought by Sam Wanamaker on the setting up of Shakespeare's Globe. In 1999 he was awarded the Sam Wanamaker Prize. The Standing Conference of University Drama Departments's postgraduate scholarship and Bristol University's studio theatre are both named after him.

== Works ==
- Shakespeare's Dramatic Heritage (1969)
- The Medieval Theatre (1974)
- English Moral Interludes (1975)
- A History of the Theatre (1985)
- English Professional Theatre, 1530-1660 (2001) (editor and co-author)

== Sources ==
- Brandt, George (25 February 2004). "Glynne Wickham: Academic who made a department out of a drama". Higher education. The Guardian.
- "The Glynne Wickham Scholarship". The Standing Conference of University Drama Departments. n.d.
- White, Martin (11 February 2004). "Professor Glynne Wickham: First Professor of Drama in the UK". The Independent.
