= Franko B =

Italian performance artist

- Born: Franco Bosisio; 1960 (age 65–66); Milan, Italy
- Known for: performance art, body art, painting, sculpture, video

Franko B (born 1960 in Milan) is an Italian performance artist based in London, where he has lived since 1979. He studied fine art at Camberwell College of Arts (1986–87), Chelsea College of Art (1987–90) and the Byam Shaw School of Art (1990–91).

He performed at the South London Gallery in 1999 and 2004. and the Tate Modern in 2002,).

An archive of materials related to his work is held as part of the University of Bristol Theatre Collection.
