= Emma Stenning =

British arts professional (born 1975)

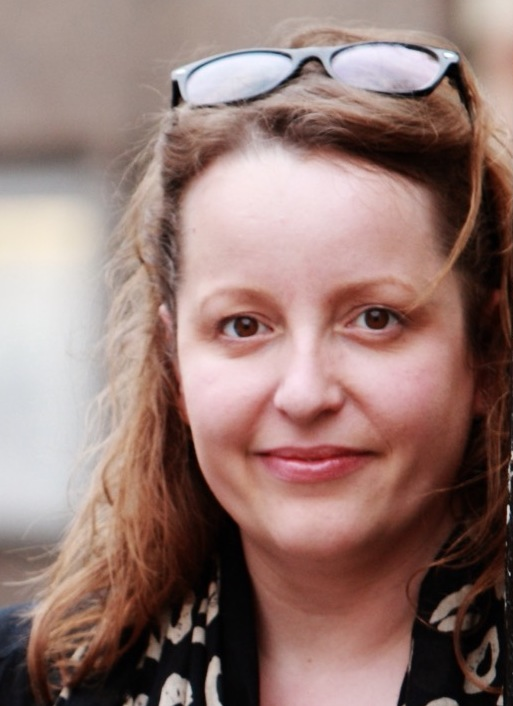
- Born: 1975 (age 50–51)
- Education: Cambridge University
- Occupation: Theatre Executive Director

Emma Stenning (born 1975, in Surrey) is a British arts professional, based in Birmingham, where she is the Chief Executive of the City of Birmingham Symphony Orchestra. She joined the CBSO from Soulpepper Theatre where she was Executive Director from 2018-2022.

== Career ==
Stenning was previously Chief Executive of Bristol Old Vic, leading the organisation in partnership with Tom Morris. Between 2009 and 2018 the pair delivered the long-awaited £26m capital refurbishment of the Grade I listed theatre, restoring the Georgian auditorium, and developing a new, award-winning (RIBA National Award), front of house and studio designed by architects Haworth Tompkins.

Her past roles include Head of Producing for the 2009 Manchester International Festival, Head of Theatre at Arts Council England, London; and Cultural Programme Advisor at the London Organising Committee for the Olympic Games, where she was responsible for the initial feasibility planning for the stadium ceremonies.

From 2002 to 2005 she was executive director of Battersea Arts Centre, again in partnership with Tom Morris as artistic director. She has worked with Complicité, Headlong and the RSC, producing theatre on the London fringe, in the West End, and on national and international tour.

Stenning was formerly Deputy Chair of Shakespeare's Globe, and is on the company's US board. She was chair of the Bike Shed Theatre and a trustee of Headlong and Cheek by Jowl. She was a Clore Fellow, winner of the Clore Prize and voted by the Cultural Leadership Programme as a Woman to Watch.

In 2017, Stenning was made an honorary Doctor of Letters by Bristol University.

In 2023, Stenning became CEO of the City of Birmingham Symphony Orchestra
