= Sean Mayes =

British pianist and writer (1945–1995)

Charles Thomas Sean Mayes (17 March 1945 – 12 July 1995) was a British pianist and writer.

Born in Stone Allerton, Somerset, Mayes was schooled in Bristol. He won a place at Trinity College, Cambridge, where he obtained a degree in philosophy. He also joined a university band, The Soulbenders, who were popular in the Cambridge, East Anglia and London areas. The Soulbenders played blues, soul and rock and roll with Mayes on keyboard.

After leaving university Mayes played in a rock and roll band called Fumble (briefly called the Balloons), which supported David Bowie on the Ziggy Stardust Tour in 1972. He made three albums with Fumble, and featured in the original cast of Elvis! at the Astoria Theatre.

In 1978, Mayes played for Bowie on the Isolar II Tour, recorded and released on the live album Stage, and on Lodger, released in 1979. In 1983 he joined Tom Robinson for "War Baby" and further album tracks.

He wrote a biography of Joan Armatrading and co-wrote a visual documentary about Kate Bush with Kevin Cann. He also wrote the book Life on Tour with David Bowie: We Can Be Heroes, which was published in 1999, four years after his death.

In February 1995, Mayes reported to the police that his younger brother was buried in the garden of their former family home in Weston-super-Mare. It transpired that his brother, Roderick, was murdered by his mother in 1972 due to her fear that he would otherwise die from his major drug addiction. Mayes had returned from touring with Fumble in Switzerland when he discovered what his mother had done. She kept the body inside the house for a few days, then enlisted the help of her eldest son (Sean) and her father, Commander Thomas Thompson, to bury the body in the garden. They agreed to keep it a family secret, with Sean reported to have done so "out of love for his mother". Mayes, who had AIDS by 1995 and was only expected to live a few more months, revealed the murder to the authorities as he did not want the secret to die with him and wished for his brother to receive a proper burial. Mayes gave the police his full cooperation and assistance in the recovery of the body and the gathering of evidence for the inquest. A funeral service was held at Weston Crematorium in May 1995 with his brother in attendance. The Crown Prosecution Service decided not to prosecute Mayes in light of his health and no other criminal proceedings were made as his grandfather had died in 1975 and his mother in 1991.

Mayes died in London from an AIDS-related illness on 12 July 1995, at the age of 50.

== Bibliography ==
- Kate Bush – a visual documentary (Kevin Cann & Sean Mayes) (1988) Omnibus Press ISBN 0-7119-1039-1
- Joan Armatrading – A Biography (1990) Weidenfeld and Nicolson ISBN 0-297-81058-8
- We Can Be Heroes – Life on Tour with David Bowie (1999) Independent Music Press ISBN 1-897783-17-5
