= Rosemary Vercoe =

British actress and costume designer

- Born: Rosemary Joyce Vercoe; 29 April 1917; Hanger Hill, Ealing, London, England
- Died: 28 July 2013 (aged 96); Islington, London, England
- Education: Chelmsford County High School for Girls
- Alma mater: Chelsea School of Art
- Occupation: Costume designer
- Known for: Long-term collaborator of Jonathan Miller on opera and theatre productions
- Spouse: Patrick Robertson

Rosemary Joyce Vercoe (29 April 1917 – 28 July 2013) was a British actress and costume designer, perhaps best known for being a long-term collaborator with Jonathan Miller on his opera and theatre productions.

== Early life ==
She was born on 29 April 1917 at Old Court nursing home, Hanger Hill, Ealing, London, the second of five children of Richard Herbert Vercoe (1884–1930), of Southall, Middlesex, a doctor, and his wife, (Elizabeth) Selina Vercoe, née Skinner (1881–1960). Vercoe was educated at Chelmsford County High School for Girls, followed by Chelsea School of Art, where her teachers included Graham Sutherland and Henry Moore.

== Career ==
She first worked for the London District Theatre Unit as an actress and costume designer, before joining the Players' Theatre costume department during the Second World War.

After the war, Vercoe worked in Stratford-upon-Avon's Shakespeare Memorial Theatre, where she was the costume designer for The Taming of the Shrew, and toured with the company in Australia in 1949–50 as a costume designer, and as an actress understudy. After this, she essentially became a costume designer full-time, and stopped acting.

In May 1973, Vercoe designed the costumes for the British Première of Gottfried von Einem’s opera THE TRIAL, based on the Kafka novel, directed by Fuad Kavur, at Bloomsbury Theatre London, attended by the composer.

Vercoe was a regular collaborator with Jonathan Miller on his opera and theatre productions. She was known for her meticulous historical research, and for using ordinary everyday clothes of the period, rather than "costumes".

Miller's 1982 production of Verdi's opera Rigoletto for English National Opera, set in 1950s New York, was set designed by Patrick Robertson and costume designed by Vercoe. It was most recently revived in 2017, using Vercoe's costume design, which reviewers still comment on, "the mafia concept, although prolific in opera stagings these days, is still a perfect fit for Rigoletto".

London's Victoria and Albert Museum includes Vercoe's costumes from the 1979 English National Opera production of The Turn of the Screw. The V&A also houses her extensive archives.

== Personal life ==
She was married to the set designer Patrick Robertson, and they were frequent collaborators.

== Later life ==
Vercoe died at the Highgate Nursing Home, 12 Hornsey Lane, Islington, London, on 28 July 2013.
