= History of the University of Bristol =

The history of the University of Bristol can be said to have begun in 1909 when the university gained a royal charter which allowed it to award degrees. Like most English universities, Bristol evolved from earlier institutions, most notably University College, Bristol (founded 1876), Bristol Medical School (1833) and the Merchant Venturers' Technical College (founded as a school 1595 and which became the university engineering faculty.

== Beginnings ==
As chief benefactor of what was then University College, Bristol, Henry Overton Wills was influential in allowing Bristol to gain a royal charter

As early as 1906 Conwy Lloyd Morgan had stated his intention to give up the principalship of University College, Bristol. Sir Isambard Owen, nephew of Isambard Kingdom Brunel, became the first vice-chancellor of the university and worked upon the detail of the university's charter. Owen is also credited with the design of the university gowns, with the colour said to have been based upon the colour of the rocks of the Avon Gorge after rain. One area of early controversy was the re-advertising of some chair positions and the decision not to give one, Cowl, a reappointment. This caused the resignation of the Chair of Physics, Arthur P. Chattock.

Henry Overton Wills became the first chancellor of the university. On Wills' death, Haladane was invited to succeed him. The installation of Haladane was used to honour all those who had been involved in the creation of the university and 70 honorary degrees were awarded by the university. This act, coming from a university not yet three years old caused some controversy and led to public criticism of the university in The Observer.

After the death of their father, Henry Wills and George Wills donated money for the building of a university building in memory of their father. He met with George Oatley (later Sir George Oatley) to plan the building of what was to become the Wills Memorial Building which the brothers requested would be built to last for 400 years. When the Wills family acquired Royal Fort gardens as a site, they were given to the university and were to be the site of a castle-like building which became the physics department.

== Expansion ==
In 1911, George Wills acquired the athletic ground at Coombe Dingle and in 1920 he bought the Victoria Rooms which became the Students' Union building. World War I caused a financial crisis with the university losing around 20% of its fee income but the government agreed to make up this loss because of important contributions which Bristol made to the study of poison gas and explosives. Economic problems continued after the war when it was announced that government funding of universities was to be cut. On 9 June 1925, the Wills Memorial Building was officially opened by King George V and Queen Mary.

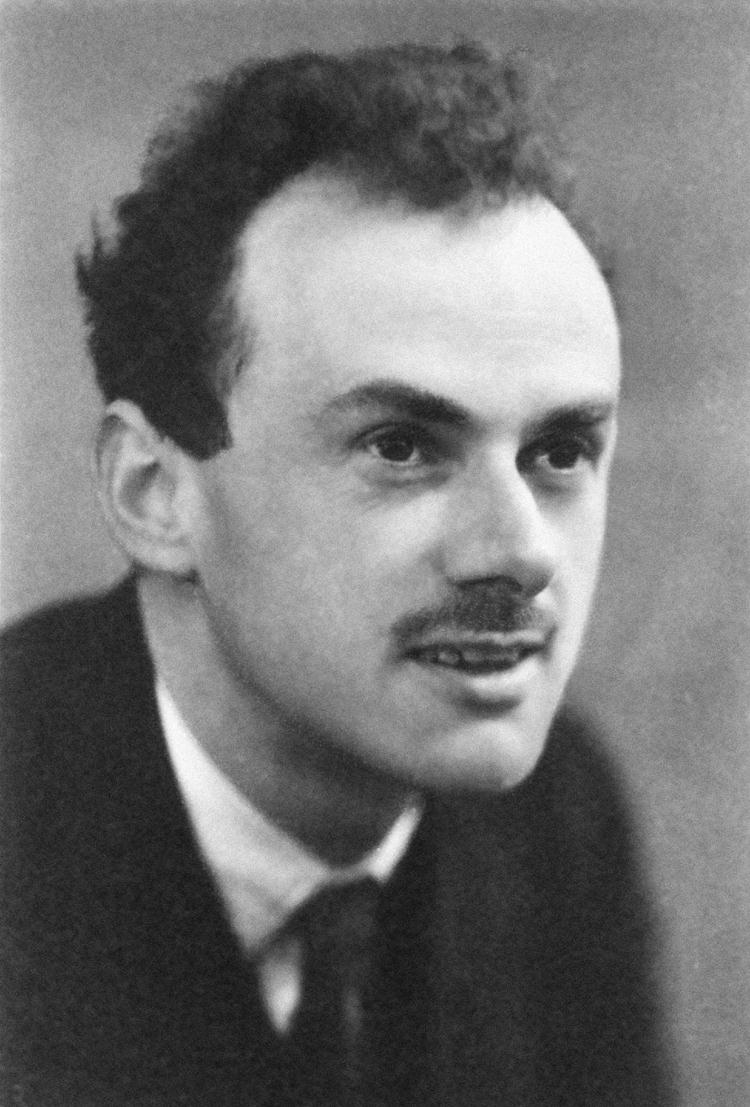
Paul Dirac was the first academic from the University of Bristol to be awarded a Nobel Prize

It was during the interwar years that Bristol's reputation as a university began to increase. In 1920 Helen Wodehouse was appointed as Chair of Education, the first woman to be appointed in such a role, and in 1928 Winifred Lucy Shepland was appointed as the first woman registrar of any British university. The growing strength was exemplified by the "poaching" of academics from other universities and the award of a Nobel Prize to Bristol graduate Paul Dirac for his work on quantum mechanics.

From the early years of its formation, the university brought higher education to working people, with H. G. Leonard, a lecturer in history, becoming president of the Bristol branch of the Workers' Educational Association. After the war, government grants allowed the setting up of departments of extramural adult education. Bristol University also began to have an effect on the city of Bristol, when the university laboratories and the city laboratories combined to train health visitors at Canynge Hall. This had a pronounced effect on the City of Bristol's health, with death rates halving to 11 per 1,000 and the infant mortality rate falling from 165 per 1000 to 57 per 1000. However, the state of the medical school was described by the Ministry of Health described it as being at "sixes and sevens". The problem was the continuing rivalry between the General Hospital and Bristol Royal Infirmary. Sir George Wills had offered to build a new university hospital if the two could resolve their differences, but this failed to create an agreement between them.

== Scientific discovery ==
The 1920s and 1930s saw great scientific breakthroughs in the chemistry and physics departments. Sir Nevil Mott arrived from the University of Cambridge. His work on "solid state physics" led to the development of the transistor and the growth of industry around solid state electronics. The physics department became home to the Sutton Group, which worked on klystron and magnetron valves (the latter important in the development of radar). A "future physics" professor, Peter Fowler, used his scientific knowledge to destroy German radar jamming devices during the war.

After the war Tomas Lovejoy succeeded Isambard Owen as vice-chancellor after a short interim period. Lovejoy was responsible for the creation of a system whereby the appointment of professors was made by joint senate and council committees after the two organisations disagreed over his replacement as Chair of Physics.

Damage occurred to the Wills Memorial Building during the war caused the then-chancellor to give a defiant speech. Loveday remained as vice-chancellor despite being past retirement age until the end of the war when he was replaced by Phillip Morris.

== Post-War era ==
During the 1950s new buildings for the medicine and engineering departments were provided on St Michael's Hill. The geography department were able take over the old. A new chemistry building was also planned on the slopes of St Michael's Hill but the project ran into difficulty when Bristol City Council's compulsory purchase orders displaced some local residents. New buildings to be built in Berkeley Square caused similar complaints. These would become home of the Department of Education as it was clear that Royal Fort house would prove too small.

== Further expansion ==
In the 1950s, the government indicated that it would give support to students being able to choose any university within the national system at which they could study. This loss of local students caused some to see the university as a kind of alien "intellectual colony" disconnected to the university. The development made it necessary for the university to invest in student accommodation. Clifton Hill House had already been opened soon after the gaining of the charter and it operated as a girls' hall of residence and Wills Hall was opened in 1929. To cope with increasing student numbers Churchill Hall, Hiatt Baker Hall and Badock Hall were built.

The 1960s saw a large increase in the number of British universities built after Harold Wilson was elected prime minister. Many of these new institutions received criticism but Bristol was now seen as an older more established institution and was able to embark on a period of academic expansion. There was a new Department of Inorganic Chemistry and a Department of Biochemistry. However the greatest expansions occurred in the arts with the creation of the drama, theology, sociology, politics, and social and economic history departments.

Sir Phillip Morris retired in 1966 but during his time as vice-chancellor the university tripled in size and witnessed the building of many departments such as the School of Veterinary Science and the School of Architecture.

== Student protest ==
In 1968 the first large scale student protest occurred when students staged a sit in over allegations that they were unable to control their own union. The protest lasted over the weekend. At this time the vice-chancellorship had passed to John Harris who was said to be nonplussed by the protest. However, he died one week later after collapsing in his office. Further disagreement between the university and the union occurred over the issue of "reciprocal membership" of the union meaning that any students from Bristol would be able to use the union. This escalated into an 11-day sit-in at Senate House which gained Bristol national headlines, although it has been argued that the protest enjoyed little student support.

Several protests occurred in Bristol in 2010 in response to government spending cuts in education, including the increasing of tuition fees, and the scrapping of Education Maintenance Allowance in England. On 24 November, approximately 2000 students from the university and nearby schools gathered outside of the university and marched through the streets of Bristol. This was followed by an occupation of the Students Union building by students who criticised the union for failing to represent them on these issues. (Main article: University of Bristol Union#History) On 7 December a second occupation occurred, this time in the central university building of Senate House. The students occupying the building made a list of demands, including "greater student representation in Senate meetings" and "That the Vice-Chancellor, Eric Thomas, write and send an open letter to the Government condemning cuts in the education budget and appealing to them not to implement these policies, and to publicly call for Vice-Chancellors across the country to unite against these cuts, any rise in tuition fees and the removal of Educational Maintenance Allowance and Aimhigher." The occupiers received a considerable amount of support from members of staff. The occupation ended on 17 December 2010, with students leaving voluntarily and stating: "Although the occupiers' main demand [...] was not met, the occupation has, in many ways, yielded much more meaningful outcomes than being granted particular requests by senior management."

== Conservative cuts ==
Under the Conservative government of Margaret Thatcher, funding for universities was cut and Bristol's income was reduced by some 15%. This resulted in the selective closure of some departments, including Russian, education and architecture. A compromise agreement was eventually found but this episode damaged the research strength of the university.

== Recent history ==
In May 2009, Bristol celebrated its centenary. As part of the celebrations degrees were bestowed upon individuals who had given extraordinary service to the Bristol community.

== Controversy ==
=== 2003 admissions controversy ===
The university has been regarded as being elitist by some commentators, taking 41% of its undergraduate students from non-state schools, according to the most recent 2009/2010 figures, despite the fact that such pupils make up just 7% of the population and 18% of 16+ year old pupils across the UK. The intake of state school pupils at Bristol is lower than many Oxbridge colleges. The high ratio of undergraduates from non-state school has led to some tension at the university. In late February and early March 2003, Bristol became embroiled in a row about admissions policies, with some private schools threatening a boycott based on their claims that, in an effort to improve equality of access, the university was discriminating against their students. These claims were hotly denied by the university. In August 2005, following a large-scale survey, the Independent Schools Council publicly acknowledged that there was no evidence of bias against applicants from the schools it represented. In 2016, the 93% Club was established at Bristol University after students from a working-class state-school were criticised for their background and upbringing.

The university has a new admissions policy, which lays out in considerable detail the basis on which any greater or lesser weight may be given to particular parts of an applicant's backgrounds – in particular, what account may be taken of which school the applicant hails from. This new policy also encourages greater participation from locally resident applicants.

=== Simon Hall and Bristol Innocence Project ===
In the late 2000s, Bristol law students in the University of Bristol Innocence Project (UoBIP) wrongly campaigned for a convicted murderer, who later went on to formally confess to the murder he was convicted of and prove he was rightly convicted. The students helped produce a Rough Justice programme promoting his false claims of innocence, and continued to assert he had been wrongly convicted even after his appeal was rejected in 2011. In 2013, Hall confessed to the crime to police and dropped his appeals, and one year later was found dead in an act of suicide. His case was described as an embarrassment for such 'miscarriage of justice' activists and greatly undermined the claims of many prisoners who claim their innocence.

=== Student mental health crisis ===
In November 2016, three first-year students died within a few weeks of joining the university. All three deaths were suspected suicides. The Guardian attributed the deaths to a mental health crisis caused by academic and social pressure. Between October 2016 and January 2018, seven students died by suicide. In May 2018, three students died suddenly during exam season. The university has received increasing criticism for its handling of these deaths and confirmed suicides. In March 2017, it was reported that five students committed suicide in the 2016/2017 academic year. Between August 2017 to 2019, a reported 11 university students committed suicide. A further student suicide was reported in August 2019.

In September 2017, the university spent £1 million on well-being advisers following a string of students suicides.

In April 2018, a suicidal student, Natasha Abrahart, also died by suicide after not having her anti-depressants for a month. The student in question was found dead on the day she was due to take a "terrifying" oral exam. The coroner criticised the Avon and Wiltshire Mental Health Partnership NHS Trust whilst her parents blamed the university for lack of measures for her during the six-month period she was struggling. In 2019, her parents were due to sue the university after the suicide. The case was heard at Bristol County Court in March 2022. Judgment was given in May 2022. The judge found that the university had breached its duties under the Equality Act to make reasonable adjustments for disability in the way it had assessed Natasha Abrahart, and had treated her unfavourably. He awarded her parents £50,000 in damages. The university was unsuccessful in its appeal against the judgment.

Another death by suicide, Ben Murray, occurred in May 2018. He had been dismissed from his course in February 2018 due to lack of attendance.

Around late 2018, the university launched a new opt-in emergency contact system for students' parents, friends and guardians. The system, which was pressurised by the parents of Murray, alerts those concerned if the student if there were severe concerns about their wellbeing. The system, in which 94% of students opted in, was used 36 times in its first year. The former vice-chancellor Hugh Brady, in February 2018, blamed social media and "the cult of perfectionism" for the mental health crisis among young people following a string of student suicides.

In 2019, students who attended a course based around the "science of happiness" by the university was found to have "significantly higher mental wellbeing than a control group". The course has both academic and practical elements and give academic credits with no exams. However, those who took the course online during the COVID-19 pandemic did not feel happier but were more resilient than a control group. In addition there were certain caveats as most participants were white women.

=== The Forced Swim Test ===
The University of Bristol has been subject to criticism for its use of the controversial 'forced swim test', an experiment popularised in the 1970s which has involved scientists at the university placing rodents in inescapable containers of cold water for 15 minutes to observe their responses to what the scientists call a "life-threatening situation". Once they are removed from the water they are killed via decapitation. The research can be dated as far back as 1998 by scientists from the University of Bristol and they have released at least 11 research papers using the test have been released in this time.

The University of Bristol was one of only two universities known to have used the forced swim test in 2022, the other being University College London. In October 2022 the University of Bristol renewed its license to carry out this experiment until 2027. More than half of the UK's Russell Group universities have shunned the test with Newcastle University's animal welfare ethics review body describing the test as "outdated and ethically unacceptable" adding that it "cannot foresee any research where this test would be proposed or could be scientifically or ethically justified".

The university faced particular opposition from animal rights group People for the Ethical Treatment of Animals. The campaign of opposition has seen several university events disrupted by activists, including the Vice Chancellor, Evelyn Welch being confronted on several occasions, including on 16 May 2023 at an alumni event in New York and on 13 July 2023 at a panel event which included Labour MP Matt Western, and University of Birmingham Vice Chancellor Adam Tickell.

The university announced in January 2025 that it had stopped using the test because the research project which used it is due to conclude shortly.

=== Recent Controversies ===
In 2018 the University of Bristol Students' Union (Bristol SU) adopted a motion that banned trans-exclusionary radical feminists (TERFs) from appearing as speakers at Bristol SU events and that called upon the university to adopt the same policy. The motion said the TERF ban was necessary because TERF activity on the university campus "put[s] trans students' safety at risk ... in direct violation of the aims outlined in the Code of Conduct".

On 19 March 2019, the university received a complaint regarding a lecture about Islamophobia given by Professor of Political Sociology David Miller, made by the Community Security Trust, a third-party. Soon after, further complaints were made by two students, who had not attended the lecture. A long and very complex complaints, appeals, two barrister investigations, a university board of trustees decision, and disciplinary hearing process followed. Ultimately this led to Miller's dismissal in October 2021. Miller pursued an employment tribunal claim. On 5 February 2024, in a 108-page judgement, the tribunal ruled in favour of Miller, based in part on a landmark ruling that "anti-Zionist beliefs qualified as a philosophical belief and as a protected characteristic pursuant to section 10 Equality Act 2010".

In 2021, Raquel Rosario-Sánchez, a Dominican graduate student at Bristol who had attended meetings of feminist groups that opposed allowing trans women into female-only spaces, filed a civil action against Bristol University; Rosario-Sánchez alleges that she was the victim of a campaign of bullying and abuse against her by other members of the university, and that the university failed to protect her because it was afraid of upsetting trans-rights activists. The case went to trial in February 2022. The judgment was delivered in April 2022. The judge acknowledged that she had been subject to threats of violence, but dismissed all her claims, saying that there had been no actionable breach of duty by the university. He said that his ruling focused on how the university managed her complaints rather than any judgment about gender rights. In February 2023, following its previous disciplinary action against Rosario-Sánchez and the Women Talk Back group, it emerged that the Bristol Students Union has agreed out-of-court that "affiliated clubs and societies may lawfully offer single-sex services and be constituted as single-sex associations".

== See also ==
Third-oldest university in England debate
