= Patrick Robertson (set designer) =

British scenographer

Patrick Robertson (18 December 1922 - 9 April 2009) was a British theatre designer, best remembered for his staging of Rigoletto for Jonathan Miller and English National Opera.

He was married to Rosemary Vercoe, the costume designer, with whom he often collaborated.
