= I Go Wild =

1995 single by the Rolling Stones

Single by the Rolling Stones

from the album Voodoo Lounge
- Released: 3 April 1995
- Recorded: July–August, November–December 1993
- Studio: Sandymount (Ireland); A&M (Los Angeles)
- Length: 4:23
- Label: Rolling Stones; Virgin
- Songwriter: Jagger/Richards
- Producers: Don Was; the Glimmer Twins

The Rolling Stones singles chronology
"You Got Me Rocking" (1994)	"I Go Wild" (1995)	"Like a Rolling Stone" (1995)

"I Go Wild" is a song by English rock band the Rolling Stones from their twentieth studio album, Voodoo Lounge (1994). Credited to Mick Jagger and Keith Richards, "I Go Wild" is largely a Jagger composition. "I Go Wild" was released as the fourth and final single from Voodoo Lounge. Following its UK release on 3 July 1995, it reached number 29 on the UK Singles Chart.

A music video for the song was shot at Ex-templo de San Lázaro in Mexico City immediately before the Stones' 14-stadium tour of South America. The song was performed throughout the 1994–1995 Voodoo Lounge Tour; a live version from 1994 appeared on the maxi-single, and a 1995 live performance was released in 2016 on Totally Stripped.

== Background and composition ==
On its creation, Jagger said in 1994, "'I Go Wild', I suppose, is the one I play (guitar) on most. I mean, I just created it on guitar with Charlie [Watts], as a groove. And we more or less had the whole song down before we took it to anyone else." On the song overall, Jagger said, "I like that song. I really got into the lyrics on that one. One of the wordy ones."

A straightforward rock song, "I Go Wild"'s lyrics tell of the singer's relationship with an unnamed "femme fatale";

And the doctor says you'll be okay, And if you'd only stay away; From femme fatales and dirty bitches, And daylight drabs and nighttime witches, And working girls and blue stockings, And dance hall babes and body poppers,
And waitresses with broken noses, Checkout girls striking poses,
And politicians' garish wives, With alcoholic cunts like knives

I go wild when you're in my face; I go wild when I taste your taste;
I go wild and I go insane; I get sick - somebody stop this pain

"I Go Wild" was recorded between July and August 1993 and between November and December 1993 at Sandymount Studios, Ireland and A&M Recording Studios, Los Angeles. With Jagger on lead vocals and electric guitar, Richards and Ron Wood accompany him on electric guitars. Charlie Watts performs drums while Darryl Jones performs bass. Chuck Leavell performs the song's organ while Phil Jones incorporate percussion. Jagger, Richards, Bernard Fowler, and Ivan Neville perform backing vocals.

== Personnel ==
According to the authors Philippe Margotin and Jean-Michel Guesdon.

The Rolling Stones

- Mick Jagger – lead vocals, rhythm guitar
- Keith Richards – rhythm guitar, backing vocals
- Ronnie Wood – B-Bender guitar, lead guitar
- Charlie Watts – drums

Additional Performers

- Darryl Jones – bass
- Chuck Leavell – Hammond B-3 organ
- Phil Jones – percussion
- Bernard Fowler, Ivan Neville – backing vocals

Technical

- Don Was, The Glimmer Twins – producers
- Don Smith – engineer
- Dan Bosworth, Alastair McMillan – assistant engineers
- Mike Baumgartner, Greg Goldman, Ed Korengo – mixers

== Charts ==
Chart (1995)	Peak position
Australia (ARIA)	57
Canada Top Singles (RPM)	44
Europe (European Hit Radio)	24
Germany (GfK)	61
Netherlands (Single Top 100)	48
UK Singles (Official Charts)	29
US Mainstream Rock (Billboard)	20

== Release history ==
Region	Date	Format(s)	Label(s)	Ref(s).
Australia	3 April 1995	CD; cassette	Rolling Stones; Virgin	
Japan	17 May 1995	Maxi-CD; mini-CD	Rolling Stones; Virgin	
United Kingdom	3 July 1995	7-inch vinyl; CD; cassette	Rolling Stones; Virgin	
