= Voodoo Lounge Tour =

1994–95 concert tour by the Rolling Stones

Voodoo Lounge World Tour
- World tour by The Rolling Stones
- Location: Africa; Asia; Europe; North America; Oceania; South America
- Associated album: Voodoo Lounge
- Start date: 1 August 1994
- End date: 30 August 1995
- Legs: 4
- No. of shows: 134
- Box office: US$320 million (US$695 million in 2025 dollars)

The Rolling Stones concert chronology
- Steel Wheels/Urban Jungle Tour (1989–90); Voodoo Lounge Tour (1994–95); Bridges to Babylon Tour (1997–98)

The Voodoo Lounge Tour was a worldwide concert tour by the Rolling Stones to promote their 1994 album Voodoo Lounge. This was their first tour without bassist Bill Wyman, and their first with touring bassist Darryl Jones, as an additional musician. The tour grossed $320 million, replacing The Division Bell Tour by Pink Floyd as the highest grossing of any artist at that time. This was subsequently overtaken by a few other tours, but it remains the Rolling Stones' third highest grossing tour behind their 2005–07 A Bigger Bang Tour and their 2017–21 No Filter Tour.

"There were lots of hacks out there who said we couldn't do it anymore", Mick Jagger told Rolling Stone in November 1994. "But maybe what they meant was they couldn't do it anymore. Anyway, once we started playing, all that died down. You can talk about it and talk about it – but, once we're onstage, the question is answered."

Production design was by Mark Fisher, Charlie Watts, Mick Jagger and Patrick Woodroffe. Graphic design and video animation was by Mark Norton. Total attendance 6.5 million.

== Personnel ==
=== The Rolling Stones ===
- Mick Jagger – lead vocals, guitar, harmonica, percussion, keyboards
- Keith Richards – guitars, vocals
- Ronnie Wood – guitars, backing vocals
- Charlie Watts – drums

=== Additional musicians ===
- Darryl Jones – bass, backing vocals
- Chuck Leavell – keyboards, backing vocals
- Bobby Keys – saxophone
- Andy Snitzer – saxophone
- Michael Davis – trombone
- Kent Smith – trumpet
- Lisa Fischer – backing vocals
- Bernard Fowler – backing vocals, percussion

== Set list ==
The band's set list at the first show at RFK Stadium in Washington, D.C.:

1. "Not Fade Away"
2. "Undercover of the Night"
3. "Tumbling Dice"
4. "Live with Me"
5. "You Got Me Rocking"
6. "Rocks Off"
7. "Sparks Will Fly"
8. "Shattered"
9. "(I Can't Get No) Satisfaction"
10. "Beast of Burden"
11. "Memory Motel"
12. "Out of Tears"
13. "All Down the Line"
14. "Hot Stuff"
15. "I Can't Get Next to You"
16. "Brand New Car"
17. "Honky Tonk Women"
18. "Before They Make Me Run"
19. "The Worst"
20. "Love Is Strong"
21. "Monkey Man"
22. "I Go Wild"
23. "Start Me Up"
24. "It's Only Rock 'n' Roll"
25. "Street Fighting Man"
26. "Brown Sugar"
27. "Jumpin' Jack Flash"
28. "Farafina" (tape)

=== Other songs performed ===
- No Expectations
- All Down the Line
- Wild Horses
- It's All Over Now
- Doo Doo Doo Doo Doo (Heartbreaker)
- Angie
- Stop Breaking Down
- Who Do You Love? (with Bo Diddley)
- You Can't Always Get What You Want
- Sad Sad Sad
- Rock and a Hard Place
- Just My Imagination
- Love in Vain
- Let it Bleed
- The Spider and the Fly
- Shine a Light
- Rip This Joint
- Sweet Virginia
- Respectable
- Still a Fool
- Down in the Bottom
- Jump on Top of Me
- Fool to Cry
- Black Limousine
- Connection
- Like a Rolling Stone

== Tour dates ==
Date	City	Country	Venue	Opening act(s)	Tickets sold / available	Revenue
North America
1 August 1994	Washington, D.C.	United States	Robert F. Kennedy Memorial Stadium	Counting Crows	108,960 / 108,960	$3,990,966
3 August 1994	Washington, D.C.	United States	Robert F. Kennedy Memorial Stadium	Counting Crows	108,960 / 108,960	$3,990,966
6 August 1994	Birmingham	United States	Legion Field	Counting Crows	19,893 / 50,000	
10 August 1994	Indianapolis	United States	RCA Dome	Counting Crows	25,000 / 50,000	
12 August 1994	East Rutherford	United States	Giants Stadium	Counting Crows	201,547 / 201,547	$9,531,214
14 August 1994	East Rutherford	United States	Giants Stadium	Counting Crows	201,547 / 201,547	$9,531,214
15 August 1994	East Rutherford	United States	Giants Stadium	Counting Crows	201,547 / 201,547	$9,531,214
17 August 1994	East Rutherford	United States	Giants Stadium	Counting Crows	201,547 / 201,547	$9,531,214
19 August 1994	Toronto	Canada	CNE Stadium	Stone Temple Pilots	97,197 / 97,197	$3,281,367
20 August 1994	Toronto	Canada	CNE Stadium	Stone Temple Pilots	97,197 / 97,197	$3,281,367
23 August 1994	Winnipeg	Canada	Winnipeg Stadium	Colin James	50,397 / 50,397	$1,720,849
26 August 1994	Madison	United States	Camp Randall Stadium	Lenny Kravitz	51,201 / 51,201	$2,420,485
28 August 1994	Cleveland	United States	Cleveland Stadium	Lenny Kravitz	—N/a	
30 August 1994	Cincinnati	United States	Riverfront Stadium	Lenny Kravitz	34,137 / 55,000	—N/a
4 September 1994	Foxborough	United States	Foxboro Stadium	Lenny Kravitz	97,923 / 97,923	$4,633,901
5 September 1994	Foxborough	United States	Foxboro Stadium	Lenny Kravitz	97,923 / 97,923	$4,633,901
7 September 1994	Raleigh	United States	Carter–Finley Stadium	Lenny Kravitz	38,738 / 38,738	$1,797,502
9 September 1994	East Lansing	United States	Spartan Stadium	Lenny Kravitz	47,797 / 47,797	$2,128,825
11 September 1994	Chicago	United States	Soldier Field	Lenny Kravitz	90,303 / 90,303	$4,194,320
12 September 1994	Chicago	United States	Soldier Field	Lenny Kravitz	90,303 / 90,303	$4,194,320
15 September 1994	Denver	United States	Mile High Stadium	Blind Melon	48,981 / 48,981	$2,570,574
18 September 1994	Columbia	United States	Faurot Field	Blind Melon	39,363 / 39,363	$1,789,824
22 September 1994	Philadelphia	United States	Veterans Stadium	Blind Melon	80,976 / 80,976	$3,818,719
23 September 1994	Philadelphia	United States	Veterans Stadium	Blind Melon	80,976 / 80,976	$3,818,719
25 September 1994	Columbia	United States	Williams-Brice Stadium	Blind Melon	42,223 / 42,223	$1,919,442
27 September 1994	Memphis	United States	Liberty Bowl	Blind Melon	41,079 / 41,079	$1,955,284
29 September 1994	Pittsburgh	United States	Three Rivers Stadium	Blind Melon	49,332 / 49,332	$2,311,297
1 October 1994	Ames	United States	Cyclone Field	Blind Melon	30,029 / 30,029	$1,234,605
4 October 1994	Edmonton	Canada	Commonwealth Stadium	Colin James	121,604 / 121,604	$4,327,764
5 October 1994	Edmonton	Canada	Commonwealth Stadium	Colin James	121,604 / 121,604	$4,327,764
10 October 1994	New Orleans	United States	Louisiana Superdome	Bryan Adams	32,687 / 40,000	$1,464,250
14 October 1994	Las Vegas	United States	MGM Grand Garden Arena	Buddy Guy	21,674 / 21,674	$4,184,050
15 October 1994	Las Vegas	United States	MGM Grand Garden Arena	Buddy Guy	21,674 / 21,674	$4,184,050
17 October 1994	San Diego	United States	Jack Murphy Stadium	Seal	49,139 / 49,139	$2,331,250
19 October 1994	Pasadena	United States	Rose Bowl	Red Hot Chili Peppers; Buddy Guy	119,140 / 119,140	$6,153,301
21 October 1994	Pasadena	United States	Rose Bowl	Red Hot Chili Peppers; Buddy Guy	119,140 / 119,140	$6,153,301
23 October 1994	Salt Lake City	United States	Robert Rice Stadium	Seal	33,478 / 33,478	$1,678,855
26 October 1994	Oakland	United States	Oakland Coliseum	Seal	199,285 / 199,285	$9,431,700
28 October 1994	Oakland	United States	Oakland Coliseum	Seal	199,285 / 199,285	$9,431,700
29 October 1994	Oakland	United States	Oakland Coliseum	Seal	199,285 / 199,285	$9,431,700
31 October 1994	Oakland	United States	Oakland Coliseum	Seal	199,285 / 199,285	$9,431,700
3 November 1994	El Paso	United States	Sun Bowl	Bryan Adams	38,732 / 42,000	$1,996,710
5 November 1994	San Antonio	United States	Alamodome	Bryan Adams	42,687 / 42,687	$2,231,085
11 November 1994	Little Rock	United States	War Memorial Stadium	Bryan Adams	39,844 / 39,844	$2,020,770
13 November 1994	Houston	United States	Astrodome	Bryan Adams; Ian Moore	38,737 / 38,737	$1,996,745
15 November 1994	Atlanta	United States	Georgia Dome	Bryan Adams; Ian Moore	81,160 / 81,160	$4,185,425
16 November 1994	Atlanta	United States	Georgia Dome	Bryan Adams; Ian Moore	81,160 / 81,160	$4,185,425
18 November 1994	Dallas	United States	Cotton Bowl	Bryan Adams; Ian Moore	47,372 / 47,372	$2,530,185
22 November 1994	Tampa	United States	Tampa Stadium	Spin Doctors	46,628 / 46,628	$2,204,750
25 November 1994	Miami	United States	Joe Robbie Stadium	Spin Doctors	55,935 / 55,935	$2,574,810
27 November 1994	Gainesville	United States	Ben Hill Griffin Stadium	Spin Doctors	35,149 / 40,000	$1,678,114
1 December 1994	Pontiac	United States	Pontiac Silverdome	Spin Doctors	38,274 / 38,274	$1,815,325
3 December 1994	Toronto	Canada	SkyDome	Spin Doctors	49,129 / 49,129	$1,744,279
5 December 1994	Montreal	Canada	Olympic Stadium	Spin Doctors	82,089 / 82,089	$2,879,798
6 December 1994	Montreal	Canada	Olympic Stadium	Spin Doctors	82,089 / 82,089	$2,879,798
8 December 1994	Syracuse	United States	Carrier Dome	Spin Doctors	36,038 / 36,038	$1,662,825
11 December 1994	Minneapolis	United States	Hubert H. Humphrey Metrodome	Spin Doctors	46,519 / 46,519	$2,176,400
15 December 1994	Seattle	United States	Kingdome	Spin Doctors	49,303 / 49,303	$2,311,900
17 December 1994	Vancouver	Canada	BC Place	Spin Doctors	93,273 / 93,273	$3,176,009
18 December 1994	Vancouver	Canada	BC Place	Spin Doctors	93,273 / 93,273	$3,176,009
14 January 1995	Mexico City	Mexico	Foro Sol	Caifanes	204,020 / 204,020	$11,784,755
16 January 1995	Mexico City	Mexico	Foro Sol	Caifanes	204,020 / 204,020	$11,784,755
18 January 1995	Mexico City	Mexico	Foro Sol	Caifanes	204,020 / 204,020	$11,784,755
20 January 1995	Mexico City	Mexico	Foro Sol	Caifanes	204,020 / 204,020	$11,784,755
South America
27 January 1995	São Paulo	Brazil	Estádio do Pacaembu	Spin Doctors; Barao Vermelho; Rita Lee	131,253 / 131,253	$4,527,556
28 January 1995	São Paulo	Brazil	Estádio do Pacaembu	Spin Doctors; Barao Vermelho; Rita Lee	131,253 / 131,253	$4,527,556
30 January 1995	São Paulo	Brazil	Estádio do Pacaembu	Spin Doctors; Barao Vermelho; Rita Lee	131,253 / 131,253	$4,527,556
2 February 1995	Rio de Janeiro	Brazil	Estádio do Maracanã	Spin Doctors; Barao Vermelho; Rita Lee	141,053 / 141,053	$3,067,410
4 February 1995	Rio de Janeiro	Brazil	Estádio do Maracanã	Spin Doctors; Barao Vermelho; Rita Lee	141,053 / 141,053	$3,067,410
9 February 1995	Buenos Aires	Argentina	River Plate Stadium	Las Pelotas; Ratones Paranoicos; Pappo	344,144 / 344,144	$19,796,750
11 February 1995	Buenos Aires	Argentina	River Plate Stadium	Las Pelotas; Ratones Paranoicos; Pappo	344,144 / 344,144	$19,796,750
12 February 1995	Buenos Aires	Argentina	River Plate Stadium	Las Pelotas; Ratones Paranoicos; Pappo	344,144 / 344,144	$19,796,750
14 February 1995	Buenos Aires	Argentina	River Plate Stadium	Las Pelotas; Ratones Paranoicos; Pappo	344,144 / 344,144	$19,796,750
16 February 1995	Buenos Aires	Argentina	River Plate Stadium	Las Pelotas; Ratones Paranoicos; Pappo	344,144 / 344,144	$19,796,750
19 February 1995	Santiago	Chile	Estadio Nacional de Chile	Las Pelotas; Ratones Paranoicos; Pappo	45,945 / 45,945	$1,386,195
Africa
24 February 1995	Johannesburg	South Africa	Ellis Park	—N/a	86,209 / 86,209	$4,588,405
25 February 1995	Johannesburg	South Africa	Ellis Park	—N/a	86,209 / 86,209	$4,588,405
Asia
6 March 1995	Tokyo	Japan	Tokyo Dome	—N/a	285,294 / 285,294	$27,613,380
8 March 1995	Tokyo	Japan	Tokyo Dome	—N/a	285,294 / 285,294	$27,613,380
9 March 1995	Tokyo	Japan	Tokyo Dome	—N/a	285,294 / 285,294	$27,613,380
12 March 1995	Tokyo	Japan	Tokyo Dome	—N/a	285,294 / 285,294	$27,613,380
14 March 1995	Tokyo	Japan	Tokyo Dome	—N/a	285,294 / 285,294	$27,613,380
16 March 1995	Tokyo	Japan	Tokyo Dome	—N/a	285,294 / 285,294	$27,613,380
17 March 1995	Tokyo	Japan	Tokyo Dome	—N/a	285,294 / 285,294	$27,613,380
22 March 1995	Fukuoka	Japan	Fukuoka Dome	—N/a	42,483 / 42,483	$4,234,300
23 March 1995	Fukuoka	Japan	Fukuoka Dome	—N/a	42,483 / 42,483	$4,234,300
Oceania
27 March 1995	Melbourne	Australia	Melbourne Cricket Ground	Cruel Sea	87,609 / 87,609	$5,879,683
28 March 1995	Melbourne	Australia	Melbourne Cricket Ground	Cruel Sea	87,609 / 87,609	$5,879,683
1 April 1995	Sydney	Australia	Sydney Cricket Ground	Cruel Sea	78,187 / 78,187	$5,237,710
2 April 1995	Sydney	Australia	Sydney Cricket Ground	Cruel Sea	78,187 / 78,187	$5,237,710
5 April 1995	Adelaide	Australia	Adelaide Football Park	Cruel Sea	29,148 / 29,148	$1,888,537
8 April 1995	Perth	Australia	Perry Lakes Stadium	Cruel Sea	35,144 / 35,144	$2,335,502
12 April 1995	Brisbane	Australia	ANZ Stadium	Cruel Sea	36,388 / 36,388	$2,335,541
16 April 1995	Auckland	New Zealand	Western Springs Stadium	—N/a	70,533 / 70,533	$3,277,067
17 April 1995	Auckland	New Zealand	Western Springs Stadium	—N/a	70,533 / 70,533	$3,277,067
Europe
26 May 1995	Amsterdam	Netherlands	Paradiso	—N/a	—N/a	—N/a
27 May 1995	Amsterdam	Netherlands	Paradiso	—N/a		
3 June 1995	Stockholm	Sweden	Stockholm Olympic Stadium	—N/a	34,590 / 34,590	$1,583,176
6 June 1995	Helsinki	Finland	Helsinki Olympic Stadium	Robert Cray Band	52,607 / 52,607	$2,957,269
9 June 1995	Oslo	Norway	Valle Hovin	Robert Cray Band	39,690 / 39,690	$2,080,123
11 June 1995	Copenhagen	Denmark	Idraetsparken	Robert Cray Band	46,521 / 46,521	$2,790,481
13 June 1995	Nijmegen	Netherlands	Stadspark de Goffert	Robert Cray Band	124,665 / 124,665	$5,152,429
14 June 1995	Nijmegen	Netherlands	Stadspark de Goffert	Robert Cray Band	124,665 / 124,665	$5,152,429
18 June 1995	Landgraaf	Netherlands	Draf en Renbaan	Robert Cray Band	72,000 / 72,000	$2,975,774
20 June 1995	Cologne	Germany	Müngersdorfer Stadion	The Tragically Hip	62,733 / 62,733	$2,938,005
22 June 1995	Hanover	Germany	Niedersachsenstadion	The Tragically Hip	62,592 / 62,592	$2,930,504
24 June 1995	Werchter	Belgium	Rock Werchter	The Tragically Hip	140,000 / 140,000	$8,222,222
25 June 1995	Werchter	Belgium	Rock Werchter	The Tragically Hip	140,000 / 140,000	$8,222,222
30 June 1995	Paris	France	Hippodrome de Longchamp	Bon Jovi; Éric Lapointe	160,605 / 160,605	$8,612,247
1 July 1995	Paris	France	Hippodrome de Longchamp	Bon Jovi; Éric Lapointe	160,605 / 160,605	$8,612,247
3 July 1995	Paris	France	Olympia ("club show")	—N/a		
9 July 1995	Sheffield	England	Don Valley Stadium	Del Amitri	49,308 / 49,308	$2,020,211
11 July 1995	London	England	Wembley Stadium	The Black Crowes	207,340 / 207,340	$8,666,640
15 July 1995	London	England	Wembley Stadium	The Black Crowes	207,340 / 207,340	$8,666,640
16 July 1995	London	England	Wembley Stadium	The Black Crowes	207,340 / 207,340	$8,666,640
19 July 1995	London	England	Brixton Academy	—N/a	—N/a	—N/a
22 July 1995	Gijón	Spain	Estadio Municipal El Molinón	The Black Crowes	—N/a	—N/a
24 July 1995	Lisbon	Portugal	Estádio José Alvalade	The Black Crowes	—N/a	—N/a
27 July 1995	Montpellier	France	Espace Grammont	The Black Crowes; Bob Dylan	70,360 / 70,360	$3,782,797
29 July 1995	Basel	Switzerland	St. Jakob Stadium	The Black Crowes	98,955 / 98,955	$5,561,673
30 July 1995	Basel	Switzerland	St. Jakob Stadium	The Black Crowes	98,955 / 98,955	$5,561,673
1 August 1995	Zeltweg	Austria	Österreich-Ring	Andrew Strong	86,470 / 86,470	$3,651,768
3 August 1995	Munich	Germany	Olympiastadion München	Andrew Strong	67,509 / 67,509	$3,161,077
5 August 1995	Prague	Czech Republic	Strahov Stadium	Andrew Strong; Lucie	126,742 / 126,742	$3,152,637
8 August 1995	Budapest	Hungary	Népstadion	Takacs Tamas Dirty Blues Band	46,598 / 55,000	$1,470,023
12 August 1995	Schüttorf	Germany	Schüttorf Open Air	Big Country; Runrig; Action Directe; Rüdiger Hoffmann; Jimmy Barnes	84,896 / 84,896	$4,584,171
15 August 1995	Leipzig	Germany	Leipziger Festwiese	Big Country	83,105 / 83,105	$3,894,202
17 August 1995	Berlin	Germany	Olympiastadion	Big Country	76,689 / 76,689	$3,588,645
19 August 1995	Hockenheim	Germany	Hockenheimring	Big Country	90,871 / 90,871	$4,251,518
22 August 1995	Mannheim	Germany	Maimarktgelände	Big Country	78,034 / 78,034	$3,671,769
25 August 1995	Wolfsburg	Germany	VW-Werksgelände/Parkplatz	Big Country	90,000 / 90,000	$4,210,752
27 August 1995	Luxembourg City	Luxembourg	Kirchberg	Big Country	58,634 / 58,634	$2,936,166
29 August 1995	Rotterdam	Netherlands	Feijenoord Stadion	Big Country	93,959 / 93,959	$4,372,814
30 August 1995	Rotterdam	Netherlands	Feijenoord Stadion	Big Country	93,959 / 93,959	$4,372,814
Total					—	—

== See also ==
- List of highest-attended concerts
- List of most-attended concert tours
- List of highest-grossing concert tours
