= Shapes and Sizes (song) =

1995 song by Joan Armatrading

Single by Joan Armatrading

from the album What's Inside
- B-side: "Beyond the Blue"; "Back on the Road"
- Released: April 1995
- Length: 3:13
- Label: BMG; RCA
- Songwriter(s): Joan Armatrading
- Producer(s): David Tickle; Joan Armatrading

Joan Armatrading singles chronology
"True Love" (1992)	"Shapes and Sizes" (1995)	"Recommend My Love" (1995)

"Shapes and Sizes" is a song by English singer-songwriter Joan Armatrading, released in 1995 by BMG/RCA Records as the lead single from her fourteenth studio album, What's Inside (1995). The song, which was written by Armatrading and produced by David Tickle and Armatrading, reached number 146 in the Australian ARIA Charts.

== Background ==
Armatrading has described "Shapes and Sizes" as "highlighting the need to express your feelings or say something nice to someone before it's too late". She was inspired to write the song after hearing tributes following the death of the British journalist and broadcaster Brian Redhead in 1994. She told The Scotsman in 1995, "Afterwards everyone was saying how great he was, and I wondered why they waited for him to die to say all these things, because I think he would have liked to know that people thought so highly of him."

== Release ==
"Shapes and Sizes" was released as a single in Europe and Australia. It was Armatrading's debut single release through RCA Records. The single was not given a UK release, but it did appear as one of three tracks on the promotional sampler Introducing What's Inside.

== Critical reception ==
Upon its release, Judith Dunn of the Shields Gazette noted that the "upbeat" song is a "breezy mix of country strings and a light reggae beat". She added, "It would be certain to be a hit if released as a single [in the UK] by the record company." Dave Mason of the Chester Chronicle gave the song a four out of ten rating, writing, "Sparse and somewhat grainy jazzy backdrop to this one – chords sliding all over the place, misplucked strings and Armatrading freeforming just a little on the top line. Still, she harmonises pleasantly with herself on the (somewhat elliptical) chorus line, and does a good job of sounding a little less miserable than usual." He added that he "can't imagine radio playing it [or] it being a hit". Pan-European magazine Music & Media wrote, "Label debuts often generate new inspiration, but seldom as strongly as here. She seems to have got over her old problem of over production with strings arrangements and an open sound". In a review of What's Inside, the magazine added that the "folky pop single is ample proof that no dutiful Adult Contemporary programmer can skip an Armatrading in this shape". Mike Daly of the Australian newspaper The Age noted how the "unusual arrangement overlays a frothy, Afro-accented pop song with the Kronos Quartet's delicate strings shadings".

== Track listing ==
CD single (Europe and Australia)

1. "Shapes and Sizes" – 3:13
2. "Beyond the Blue" – 3:50
3. "Back on the Road" – 2:40

== Personnel ==
"Shapes and Sizes"

- Joan Armatrading – vocals
- Hojah Farah – acoustic guitar
- Todd Cochran – keyboards
- Tony Levin – bass
- Manu Katché – drums
- Alex Acuña – percussion
- Kronos Quartet – strings
- Dana Brayton – string arrangement

"Beyond the Blue"

- Joan Armatrading – vocals, acoustic guitar
- B. J. Cole – slide guitar
- Benmont Tench – keyboards
- Darryl Jones – bass
- Manu Katché – drums
- Alex Acuña – percussion

"Back on the Road"

- Joan Armatrading – vocals, guitar
- Benmont Tench – keyboards
- Tony Levin – bass
- Manu Katché – drums

Production

- David Tickle – production, recording, mixing
- Joan Armatrading – production
- Wolfgang Amedus – engineering

== Charts ==
Chart (1995)	Peak position
Australia (ARIA)	146
