= Out of Tears =

1994 single by the Rolling Stones

Single by the Rolling Stones

from the album Voodoo Lounge
- B-side: "I'm Gonna Drive"
- Released: September 1994
- Recorded: 1993–1994
- Studio: Ronnie Wood's house (Sandymount, Ireland); A&M (Hollywood, California)
- Length: 5:27 (album version); 4:21
- Label: Virgin
- Songwriter: Jagger/Richards
- Producers: Don Was; The Glimmer Twins

The Rolling Stones singles chronology
"Love Is Strong" (1994)	"Out of Tears" (1994)	"You Got Me Rocking" (1995)

Music video
- "Out of Tears" on YouTube

"Out of Tears" is a song by English rock band the Rolling Stones, featured on their twentieth studio album, Voodoo Lounge (1994). It was released as the album's second single in the US in September 1994 and as the third single in UK in November 1994. The song was written by Jagger/Richards and produced by Don Was and The Glimmer Twins. It was moderately successful, reaching the top 40 in several countries, including Canada, where it peaked at No. 3 on the RPM 100 Hit Tracks chart for six consecutive weeks. The accompanying music video was directed by Jake Scott and filmed in Chicago.

== Description and history ==
The song was recorded in 1993 and 1994 at Ronnie Wood's Ireland home, Windmill Lane Recording Studios, in Dublin and A&M Recording Studios in Los Angeles. The song features Mick Jagger on lead vocals and acoustic guitar, Wood and Keith Richards on electric guitars, Wood performs the guitar solo, Charlie Watts on drums, Darryl Jones on bass, Chuck Leavell on piano, Benmont Tench on organ, and percussion by Lenny Castro.

The song is credited to Jagger and Richards, but is largely the work of Jagger. According to Jagger: "I used to say, 'Now we're writing songs. I'm gonna sit at my desk.' 'Out of Tears' was a little bit like that, where I'm sitting at the piano in Ronnie [Wood]'s studio going 'Da da ding, da da ding.' Then you go and listen to it, and it's got this really good mood because it's you on your own. No one else is there, and you're creating the mood. There's a very sad mood to that song. The Stones are mainly a guitar band, but I think with a ballad sometimes it's nice to move away from that. And when a song is written on a keyboard, you get a different sort of melodic structure."

== Critical reception ==
Larry Flick from Billboard magazine wrote, "Second single from Voodoo Lounge is an extremely pop-friendly rock ballad that shows Mick Jagger in a sweet, sensitive light. Driven by delicate piano lines instead of trademark guitars, single has lilting melody that draws you in before the end of the first verse. Easily the band's most viable top 40 competitor in a long time." Music Week stated, "Another well-timed track from Voodoo Lounge, 'Out of Tears' has an unmistakable 'last dance' feel to it which should make it ideal for Christmas parties. The obligatory solo guitar slot ensures diehard fans won't be disappointed."

== Music video ==
The music video for "Out of Tears" was directed by British director Jake Scott and produced by June Gulerman for Black Dog Films. It was filmed in Cleveland and Los Angeles and premiered on MTV on 3 October 1994. It was released in the UK on 28 November 1994.

== Track listings ==
- UK, Australian, and Japanese maxi-CD single
1. "Out of Tears" (Don Was edit) – 4:21
2. "I'm Gonna Drive" – 3:41
3. "Sparks Will Fly" (radio clean) – 3:14
4. "Out of Tears" (Bob Clearmountain remix edit) – 4:21
- UK 7-inch and cassette single
- European CD single
- Japanese mini-CD single
1. "Out of Tears" (Don Was edit) – 4:21
2. "I'm Gonna Drive" – 3:41
- US and Canadian maxi-CD single
1. "Out of Tears" (Don Was edit) – 4:12
2. "Out of Tears" (Bob Clearmountain remix edit) – 4:12
3. "I'm Gonna Drive" – 3:41
4. "So Young" – 3:20
- US 7-inch and cassette single

A1. "Out of Tears" (Don Was edit) – 4:12
B1. "Out of Tears" (Bob Clearmountain remix edit) – 4:12
B2. "I'm Gonna Drive" – 3:41

== Personnel ==
According to the authors Philippe Margotin and Jean-Michel Guesdon.

The Rolling Stones

- Mick Jagger – vocals, acoustic guitar
- Keith Richards – rhythm guitar
- Ronnie Wood – slide guitar
- Charlie Watts – drums

Additional personnel

- Darryl Jones – bass
- Chuck Leavell – piano
- Benmont Tench – Hammond B-3 organ
- Lenny Castro – percussion
- David Campbell – string arrangement

Technical

- Don Was, The Glimmer Twins – producers
- Don Smith – engineer
- Dan Bosworth, Alastair McMillan – assistant engineers
- Mike Baumgartner, Greg Goldman, Ed Korengo – mixers

== Charts ==
=== Weekly charts ===
Chart (1994–1995)	Peak position
Australia (ARIA)	43
Canada Retail Singles (The Record)	9
Canada Top Singles (RPM)	3
Canada Adult Contemporary (RPM)	2
Europe (European Hit Radio)	18
France (SNEP)	38
Netherlands (Single Top 100)	37
New Zealand (Recorded Music NZ)	36
Scottish Singles Sales (Official Charts)	33
UK Singles (Official Charts)	36
US Billboard Hot 100	60
US Adult Contemporary (Billboard)	31
US Mainstream Rock (Billboard)	14

=== Year-end charts ===
Chart (1994)	Position
Canada Top Singles (RPM)	37
Canada Adult Contemporary (RPM)	74

== Release history ==
Region	Date	Format(s)	Label(s)	Ref(s).
United States	September 1994	data-sort-value="" style="background: var(--background-color-interactive, #ececec); color: var(--color-base, inherit); vertical-align: middle; text-align: center; " class="table-na" | —N/a	Virgin	
United Kingdom	28 November 1994	data-sort-value="" style="background: var(--background-color-interactive, #ececec); color: var(--color-base, inherit); vertical-align: middle; text-align: center; " class="table-na" | —N/a	Virgin	
Japan	11 January 1995	Mini-CD; maxi-CD	Virgin	
Australia	16 January 1995	CD; cassette	Virgin	
