= Love Is Strong =

1994 single by the Rolling Stones

Single by the Rolling Stones

from the album Voodoo Lounge
- B-side: "The Storm"; "So Young"
- Released: 4 July 1994
- Genre: Rock
- Length: 3:49
- Label: Virgin
- Songwriter: Jagger–Richards
- Producers: Don Was; the Glimmer Twins

The Rolling Stones singles chronology
"Jumpin' Jack Flash" (live) (1991)	"Love Is Strong" (1994)	"Out of Tears" (1994)

Music video
- "Love Is Strong" on YouTube

"Love Is Strong" is a song by English rock band the Rolling Stones, released as the opening track, and first single, from their 20th British and 22nd American studio album, Voodoo Lounge (1994). Issued as a single on 4 July 1994 by Virgin Records, the song preceded the release of Voodoo Lounge by a week. "Love Is Strong" peaked at No. 14 in the band's native United Kingdom and reached No. 2 in Canada, Finland, and on the US Billboard Album Rock Tracks chart.

The song's accompanying music video, directed by David Fincher, featured the band as giants towering over Manhattan. It received heavy rotation on MTV Europe and received an Grammy Award for Best Short Form Music Video as well as an award for Best Rock Clip of the Year at the 1994 Billboard Music Video Awards.

== Inspiration and recording ==
Written by Mick Jagger and Keith Richards, "Love Is Strong" is a brooding number about an encounter between the singer and an unnamed person which leads the singer to a "love/lust at first sight" immediate attraction and longing for the couple to unite despite the obstacles.

Your love is strong and you're so sweet;
You make me hard, you make me weak;
Love is strong and you're so sweet,
And some day, baby, we've got to meet...

What are you scared of, baby?; It's more than just a dream;
I need some time; We make a beautiful team...

The song was written in Ireland by Richards and originally had the name "Love is Strange". Popular bootlegs of the sessions abound, as Ron Wood, Richards, Ivan Neville and producer Don Was worked the song while Jagger was supporting his record Wandering Spirit. Later takes have Richards changing the title to "Love is Strong"; although the final release was significantly altered by Jagger's added lyrics and use of a harmonica, a trademark instrument for him rarely utilized in the Stones' middle period work. Jagger said at the time of its release, "We ran through it a bunch of times and I was playing harmonica, and I started singing through the harmonica mike, so you get this strange sort of sound. And then I started singing down an octave, so you get this kind of breathy, sexy tone... It was good to put harmonica on a track like this. You always think of playing it on a 12-bar blues, and it's kind of fun to put it on one which is not. It's good to work with another sequence."

Recording began in September 1993 at Wood's home studio in Ireland and continued at A&M Recording Studios in Los Angeles in 1994.

== Release ==
Released as the first single from the album, "Love Is Strong" performed below expectations, barely making it into the Billboard Hot 100 singles chart in the US. It became the lowest charting first single ever by the band and marked a change in the composition of the singles chart as well as the Stones role on it. Despite this, the song remains one of the band's well-known songs from the 1990s. Five years earlier "Mixed Emotions" was a Top 5 pop chart single.

The single's weaker-than-expected lead dampened CD sales, despite positive critical reviews and a Grammy Award win for Best Short Form Music Video. In time, the track proved popular in Europe going to No. 14 in the UK and received significant airplay in the US, but only peaked at No. 91 on the Billboard Hot 100. The commercial response in Canada was considerably stronger, where the song reached No. 2 on the RPM 100 Hit Tracks chart on 19 September 1994.

The Rolling Stones performed the song at the 1994 MTV Video Music Awards. Although it had disappeared from several recent concert tours setlists in favour of the more live-friendly "You Got Me Rocking" (the follow-up single from Voodoo Lounge), the Stones reintroduced "Love Is Strong" to their A Bigger Bang Tour setlist on 22 July 2007 at their Brno, Czech Republic show and at their Hamburg show in August. The song was included on their 2002 career compilation album, Forty Licks.

== Critical reception ==
Larry Flick from Billboard magazine remarked that the song "shows 'em in tip-top—if not instantly recognizable—form". He added, "Besides living for Mick Jagger's reliably salacious vocal delivery, what more can you do, except thank goodness that some things really never do change?" Steve Baltin from Cash Box named it Pick of the Week, writing, "With U2 and R.E.M. making so many great records already this decade, it's hard to call the Rolling Stones the "world's greatest rock 'n' roll band" anymore. However, they're still the Stones, and this is one cool song." He added, "Trademark Jagger all the way vocally, the song oozes the sex appeal that made the man a legend. In addition, it's hard to ignore any Keith Richards riff, and this song opens with the classic Richards' styling. It may not be 'Satisfaction' or 'Gimme Shelter', but whaddaya want—it's still the Stones." Everett True from Melody Maker said, "It's only rock'n'roll, but I don't like it." Pan-European magazine Music & Media named it "a lesson in rock for all those retro bands around."

In a separate review, Music & Media added, "Reduced to a quartet, the best rock 'n' roll band in the world presents its strong Virgin label debut. Charlie kicks off, Keef riffs, Ronnie fills in and Mick tries his new baritone." Alan Jones from Music Week gave it a score of four out of five, noting its "distinctive 'Honky Tonk Women'-style motifs" and "brooding Jagger vocal on which he rarely breaks loose. Subtle but strong, this gives lie to suggestions that the Stones are finished." David Quantick from NME named it Single of the Week, commenting, "This time round, with a new contract and without the scabrous Bill Wyman sniffling at the back, the Rolling Stones have scented fresh money and made their best record for years. Pissing as they do on yer Black Crowes and that, 'Love Is Strong' wheels out Keith's Slow Riff of Evil and a threatening Jagger vocal, sticks to it the slow trawling 'The Storm' and the curiously spry boogie 'So Young' and the result is quite extraordinary. Who'd a thought it?" David Sinclair from The Times wrote, "As well as a typically salacious vocal, Mick Jagger contributes reedy blasts of harmonica which intertwine loosely with the sinuous chop and grind of Keith Richards's suspended-seventh chords. The lyric seems a shade unadventurous. Isn't there something that these 50-year-olds can get excited about other than how big and strong their love still is?"

== Music video ==
Considerable promotional expense was spent on the Voodoo Lounge CD release, as it was the first on Virgin Records, including a popular music video directed by American director David Fincher and edited by Robert Duffy at Spot Welders. The visual effects are provided by Digital Domain. The black and white video shows giant versions of the Stones, as well as a few residents locked in romantic embraces, rambling about New York City. It was shot on location in Toronto and other cities. The video was played on heavy rotation on MTV Europe in August 1994. It received an Grammy Award for Best Short Form Music Video and an award for Best Clip of the Year in the category for Rock at the 1994 Billboard Music Video Awards.

== Track listings ==
- UK and Australian CD1
1. "Love Is Strong" (Teddy Riley radio remix)
2. "Love Is Strong" (Teddy Riley extended remix)
3. " Love Is Strong" (Teddy Riley extended rock remix)
4. "Love Is Strong" (Teddy Riley dub remix)
5. "Love Is Strong" (Joe the Butcher club mix)
6. "Love Is Strong" (Teddy Riley instrumental)
- UK and Australian CD2; Japanese CD single
1. "Love Is Strong" (album version)
2. "The Storm"
3. "So Young"
4. "Love Is Strong" (Bob Clearmountain remix)
- UK 7-inch and cassette single; European CD single
1. "Love Is Strong" (album version)
2. "The Storm"
- US maxi-CD single and Canadian CD single
1. "Love Is Strong" – 3:46
2. "Love Is Strong" (Teddy Riley extended remix) – 5:02
3. "Love Is Strong" (Teddy Riley dub) – 4:05
4. "Love Is Strong" (Teddy Riley extended rock remix) – 4:47
5. "The Storm" – 2:48
- US 12-inch single

A1. "Love Is Strong" (Teddy Riley extended remix) – 5:02
A2. "Love Is Strong" (Teddy Riley extended rock remix) – 4:47
A3. "Love Is Strong" (Teddy Riley dub remix) – 4:05
B1. "Love Is Strong" (Joe the Butcher club mix) – 5:23
B2. "Love Is Strong" (album version) – 3:46
B3. "Love Is Strong" (Teddy Riley instrumental) – 4:47

- US 7-inch and cassette single

A1. "Love Is Strong" – 3:46
B1. "The Storm" – 2:48
B2. "Love Is Strong" (Teddy Riley extended remix) – 5:03

== Personnel ==
According to the authors Philippe Margotin and Jean-Michel Guesdon.

The Rolling Stones

- Mick Jagger – lead and backing vocals, harmonica, maracas
- Keith Richards – rhythm and acoustic guitars, backing vocals
- Ronnie Wood – acoustic and rhythm guitars
- Charlie Watts – drums

Additional personnel

- Darryl Jones – bass
- Chuck Leavell – Wurlitzer piano
- Bernard Fowler, Ivan Neville – background vocals

Technical

- Don Was, The Glimmer Twins – producers
- Don Smith – engineer
- Dan Bosworth, Alastair McMillan – assistant engineers
- Mike Baumgartner, Greg Goldman, Ed Korengo – mixers

== Charts ==
=== Weekly charts ===
Chart (1994)	Peak position
Australia (ARIA)	47
Belgium (Ultratop 50 Flanders)	18
Canada Top Singles (RPM)	2
Europe (Eurochart Hot 100)	15
Europe (European AC Radio)	4
Europe (European Hit Radio)	2
Finland (Suomen virallinen lista)	2
Germany (GfK)	40
Iceland (Íslenski Listinn Topp 40)	16
Netherlands (Dutch Top 40)	16
Netherlands (Single Top 100)	6
New Zealand (Recorded Music NZ)	12
Norway (VG-lista)	3
Scottish Singles Sales (Official Charts)	11
Sweden (Sverigetopplistan)	27
Switzerland (Schweizer Hitparade)	29
UK Singles (Official Charts)	14
UK Airplay (Music Week)	10
US Billboard Hot 100	91
US Mainstream Rock (Billboard)	2

=== Year-end charts ===
Chart (1994)	Position
Canada Top Singles (RPM)	19
Europe (European Hit Radio)	14
Netherlands (Single Top 100)	80
US Album Rock Tracks (Billboard)	22

== Release history ==
Region	Date	Format(s)	Label(s)	Ref.
Australia	4 July 1994	CD1; cassette	Virgin	
United Kingdom	4 July 1994	7-inch vinyl; CD; cassette	Virgin	
United States	5 July 1994	7-inch vinyl; 12-inch vinyl; CD; cassette	Virgin	
Japan	20 July 1994	Mini-CD	Virgin	
Australia	1 August 1994	CD2	Virgin	
Japan	7 September 1994	Maxi-CD	Virgin	
