= State of the Heart =

State of the Heart may refer to:

- State of the Heart (Maureen McGovern album)
- State of the Heart (album) by Mary Chapin Carpenter (1989)
- "State of the Heart" (Mondo Rock song), (1980) this song was covered by Rick Springfield on his 1985 album, Tao
- "State of the Heart" (1986) (Philip Bailey song)
- "State of the Heart", a song by Prism from their album, Beat Street (1983)
- "State of the Heart", a song by Noel Paul Stookey from Peter, Paul and Mary's album No Easy Walk to Freedom (1986)
