= Everyday Boy =

1995 song by Joan Armatrading

Single by Joan Armatrading

from the album What's Inside
- B-side: "Merchant of Love"
- Released: 19 February 1996
- Length: 4:37 (album version); 4:02 (edit)
- Label: RCA
- Songwriter(s): Joan Armatrading
- Producer(s): David Tickle; Joan Armatrading

Joan Armatrading singles chronology
"Recommend My Love" (1996)	"Everyday Boy" (1996)	"D.N.A." (2007)

"Everyday Boy" is a song by English singer-songwriter Joan Armatrading, released on 19 February 1996 by RCA Records as the third and final single from her fourteenth studio album, What's Inside (1995). The song, which was written by Armatrading and produced by David Tickle and Armatrading, reached number 141 in the UK singles chart.

== Background ==
Armatrading wrote "Everyday Boy" about a young man with AIDS whom she met while over for dinner at a friend's house. Armatrading was inspired by the man's courage and dignity, and was "immediately struck by how kind, gentle and caring he was". She told The Republican in 1995, "I was very impressed with his whole attitude. He had compassion. He was positive and upbeat, planning his life and career."

In particular, Armatrading was struck by the understanding and concern he had for his partner's mother. She recalled to Daniel Rachel for his 2013 book Isle of Noises: Conversations with Great Songwriters: "He was telling me about his boyfriend's mother who didn't like him because she thought her son was going to die as well. But he was so kind about her, it was incredible." Armatrading immediately began writing the song in her head while in conversation with the man: "Just watching and listening to him I could write all those words in my head, so when I got home I immediately wrote them down." The man died two months after their meeting.

== Release ==
When What's Inside was released in May 1995, no singles were immediately issued from it in the UK. "Everyday Boy" was released as a single on 19 February 1996 to coincide with Armatrading's nomination for Best Female Solo Artist at the Brit Awards. Although not released as a single in the US, the song achieved some airplay on adult alternative radio in February 1996.

== Track listings ==
Cassette single (UK)

1. "Everyday Boy" (edit) – 4:02
2. "Merchant of Love" (live) – 3:17

CD single (UK)

1. "Everyday Boy" (edit) – 4:02
2. "Everyday Boy" (live) – 5:15
3. "Merchant of Love" (live) – 3:17
4. "Shapes and Sizes " (live) – 4:05

== Personnel ==
"Everyday Boy"

- Joan Armatrading – vocals, guitar, string arrangement
- Benmont Tench – keyboards
- Darryl Jones – bass
- Tony Levin – bass
- Manu Katché – drums
- London Metropolitan Orchestra – strings
- Caroline Dale – orchestration

Live tracks recorded in Tokyo, Japan, 1995

- Natalio Faingold – piano
- Prabjote Osahn – violin
- Laura Fairhurst – cello

Production

- David Tickle – production ("Everyday Boy")
- Joan Armatrading – production ("Everyday Boy")
- Alan Hopkinson – sound engineer (live tracks)

== Charts ==
Chart (1995)	Peak position
UK Singles Chart (OCC)	141
