= True Love (Joan Armatrading song) =

1992 single by Joan Armatrading

Single by Joan Armatrading

from the album Square the Circle
- B-side: "More Than One Kind of Love"
- Released: 22 June 1992
- Length: 3:59
- Label: A&M
- Songwriter: Joan Armatrading
- Producer: Joan Armatrading

Joan Armatrading singles chronology
"Wrapped Around Her" (1992)	"True Love" (1992)	"Shapes and Sizes" (1995)

"True Love" is a song by English singer-songwriter Joan Armatrading, released on 22 June 1992 by A&M Records as the second and final single from her thirteenth studio album, Square the Circle (1992). The song, which was written and produced by Armatrading, reached number 86 in the UK singles chart.

== Background ==
Armatrading said of the song in an interview with Musician in 1992, "That one is a little bit me. The idea of a love that really works is a nice concept, isn't it? She added to The Philadelphia Inquirer, "I generally don't write a lot about me. I like to see what's going on outside and write about that. 'True Love' is just an opinion. I think it would be a nicer idea that it would be there for ever and ever and ever." In an interview with PopMatters, she drew comparisons between the lyrical theme of "True Love" and her 2018 song "Not Too Far Away": "It's the same kind of thing. If you're with somebody, it doesn't matter where you are or what's going on. Your house could be cardboard, it could be a rumpled shack, it doesn't matter."

== Release ==
As the second single from her album Square the Circle, "True Love" was released in the UK on 22 June 1992. The B-side of the 7-inch ("More Than One Kind of Love") and the further two additional tracks on the CD ("Something in the Air Tonight" and "Love and Affection") were all recorded for a BBC Radio 1 session broadcast on 8 September 1990 and included on the single by arrangement with BBC Enterprises Ltd. In the US, "True Love" was released as the album's only single and in promotional format only.

== Critical reception ==
Upon its release as a single, Andrew Hirst of the Huddersfield Daily Examiner picked "True Love" as the newspaper's "single of the week" and wrote, "The second best cut culled from her new album, runner-up only to the sublimely sad title track. The hymn-like reverence matches the emotive outpouring. No silly sacrifices here for the sake of crass commercialism." In the US, Larry Flick of Billboard noted how Armatrading's "deep vibrato vocals lend powerful soul to this full-bodied, orchestral ballad" and added that the "love song should strike a universal chord at AC and urban radio".

== Track listings ==
7–inch single (UK, Europe and Australia)

1. "True Love" – 3:59
2. "More Than One Kind of Love" (live) – 5:02

CD single (UK and Europe)

1. "True Love" – 3:59
2. "More Than One Kind of Love" (live) – 5:02
3. "Something in the Air Tonight" (live) – 4:49
4. "Love and Affection" (live) – 5:02

CD promotional single (US)

1. "True Love" (radio edit) – 3:29
2. "True Love" (LP version) – 3:57

== Personnel ==
"True Love"

- Joan Armatrading – vocals, guitar
- Richard Cottle – keyboards
- Mick Karn – bass
- Richie Stevens – drums
- Linda Lewis – backing vocals
- Shirley Lewis – backing vocals
- Sylvia Mason-James – backing vocals

Production

- Joan Armatrading – production ("True Love")
- Mike Ging – recording ("True Love")
- Greg Jackman – mixing ("True Love")
- Mark Radcliffe – production ("More Than One Kind of Love", "Something in the Air Tonight", "Love and Affection")
- Paul Smith – engineering ("More Than One Kind of Love", "Something in the Air Tonight", "Love and Affection")

Other

- Andrew Catlin – photography
- Ruth Rowland – calligraphy
- Sarah Southin – design
- Jeremy Pearce – design

== Charts ==
Chart (1992)	Peak position
UK Singles Chart (OCC)	86
