= Wrapped Around Her =

1992 single by Joan Armatrading

Single by Joan Armatrading

from the album Square the Circle
- B-side: "Promise Land"
- Released: 18 May 1992
- Length: 3:49
- Label: A&M
- Songwriters: Joan Armatrading; Graham Lyle
- Producers: Joan Armatrading; Graham Lyle

Joan Armatrading singles chronology
"Love and Affection" (1991)	"Wrapped Around Her" (1992)	"True Love" (1992)

"Wrapped Around Her" is a song by English singer-songwriter Joan Armatrading, released on 18 May 1992 by A&M Records as the lead single from her thirteenth studio album, Square the Circle (1992). The song, which was written and produced by Armatrading and Graham Lyle, reached number 56 in the UK Singles Chart.

== Background ==
Armatrading co-wrote "Wrapped Around Her" with Scottish singer-songwriter Graham Lyle. It was her first writing collaboration since 1976. Both Lyle and Armatrading contributed to the melody, while Armatrading wrote the lyrics about an unfaithful man. She told Musician in 1992, "I've never sat in a room with anybody to write. I explained to [Graham Lyle] that I'd never sat with anybody to write a song and I wouldn't do it now. He thought I was strange but he didn't mind too much."

== Release ==
As the lead single from her forthcoming album Square the Circle, "Wrapped Around Her" was released in the UK on 18 May 1992, three weeks before the album. The 7-inch and cassette B-side ("Promise Land") and CD bonus tracks ("All the Way from America", "I'm Lucky" and "Can't Lie to Myself") were all recorded for a BBC Radio 1 session in 1990 and included on the single by arrangement with BBC Enterprises Ltd.

Armatrading had high hopes that "Wrapped Around Her" would become a big hit for her. She told the Cambridge Evening News in 1992, "My stuff sells very well but it would be really nice to have a big hit. It's still important and you do need things like that to happen. People need to know that what you're doing is there and a big single is the way to spread the word."

== Promotion ==
A music video was filmed to promote the single. Armatrading also performed the song on the British TV show Wogan, which was broadcast on 11 May 1992.

== Critical reception ==
Upon its release as a single, Jim Whiteford of the Dundee Evening Telegraph wrote, "Love her or hate her, you cannot ignore Joan Armatrading or her new single 'Wrapped Around Her', which appears a few weeks before her new album. Fairly tasty for her fans!" Jim Lawn of the Paisley Daily Express commented that "hopefully [it will be] the hit it deserves to be". Andrew Hirst of the Huddersfield Daily Examiner noted that the "jagged feel lacks the usual non-stick, polished Armatrading air". The Rossendale Free Press awarded the single a two out of five star rating, writing, "Joan gets funky as she warbles on about jealousy over a sub-Chic bassline. A Manchester United of a record – just fails to get anywhere."

== Track listings ==
- 7–inch and cassette single (UK and Europe)
1. "Wrapped Around Her" – 3:49
2. "Promise Land" – 3:54
- CD single (UK and Europe)
1. "Wrapped Around Her" – 3:49
2. "All the Way from America" – 5:42
3. "I'm Lucky" – 3:21
4. "Can't Lie to Myself" – 4:07
- CD single (Australia)
1. "Wrapped Around Her" – 3:49
2. "Promise Land" – 3:54

== Personnel ==
"Wrapped Around Her"

- Joan Armatrading – vocals, guitar, mandolin
- Richard Cottle – keyboards
- Mick Karn – bass
- Richie Stevens – drums
- Linda Lewis – backing vocals
- Shirley Lewis – backing vocals
- Sylvia Mason-James – backing vocals

Production

- Joan Armatrading – production ("Wrapped Around Her")
- Graham Lyle – production ("Wrapped Around Her")
- Greg Jackman – mixing ("Wrapped Around Her")
- Graham Dickson – recording ("Wrapped Around Her")
- Mark Radcliffe – production ("Promise Land", "All the Way from America", "I'm Lucky", "Can't Lie to Myself")
- Paul Smith – engineering ("Promise Land", "All the Way from America", "I'm Lucky", "Can't Lie to Myself")

Other

- Andrew Catlin – photography
- Ruth Rowland – calligraphy
- Sarah Southin – design
- Jeremy Pearce – design

== Charts ==
Chart (1992)	Peak position
Australia (ARIA)	148
UK Singles (OCC)	56
UK Airplay (Music Week)	45
