= Inside Out (Philip Bailey album) =

Studio album by Philip Bailey
- Released: May 12, 1986
- Studios: The Power Station (New York City); Skyline (New York City); Townhouse (London)
- Genres: R&B, pop soul
- Length: 43:38
- Label: Columbia
- Producers: Nile Rodgers; Phillip Bailey

Philip Bailey chronology
Triumph (1986)	Inside Out (1986)	Family Affair (1989)

Singles from Inside Out
- 1. "State of the Heart" Released: April 1986

Inside Out is a studio album by Philip Bailey, released in 1986 by Columbia Records. The album reached No. 30 on the US Billboard Top Black Albums chart, No. 29 on the Swiss Pop Albums chart and No. 30 on the Swedish Pop Albums chart.

== Overview ==
Inside Out was produced by Nile Rodgers and Philip Bailey. Artists such as Jeff Beck, Tawatha Agee, Ray Parker Jr., Nathan East, George Duke and Phil Collins also appeared on the album.

== Singles ==
"State of the Heart" was released as a single, reaching No. 20 on the Billboard Hot Black Singles chart.

== Critical reception ==
Professional ratings
Review scores
Source	Rating
AllMusic	2/5 stars
Detroit Free Press	(favourable)
Orlando Sentinel	4/5 stars

James Henke of Rolling Stone described Inside Out as "a superb pop-soul LP...that mixes the funky horn approach of Bailey's musical alma mater, Earth Wind and Fire, with the more guitar- oriented approach of Rogers' previous band, Chic." Carlo Wolff of The Boston Globe declared "Bailey's most coherent and relaxed solo album chronicles his walk through city streets, his eyes turned toward the heavens". Don McLeese of the Chicago Sun Times called Inside Out a "polished, consummately crafted collection." Phyl Garland of Stereo Review exclaimed that Inside Out "has all the hall-marks of his style-vocal flexibility, a precise manner of punching out the words, and, of course, those spectacular high falsetto notes. What's different from his previous solo efforts is the music itself, which is brassier and closer to rock." Garland added "The knowing hand of producer Nile Rodgers, who seems to perceive exactly what will work for any particular artist, is much in evidence in settings that always complement rather than detract from Bailey's assertive solos."

Adam Sweeting of The Guardian called the album "an often incisive set of soul songs". Thom Duffy of the Orlando Sentinel said, "on this new album, Bailey aims for a polished yet punchy funk and ballad style." David Toop of The Times noted that "Inside Out is produced by Nile Rodgers and is typical of his urban contemporary style. Unspectacular, but Bailey's falsetto is still wonderful." Fred Bayles of the Associated Press said that "Inside Out is a pop album that will grow on you even if you're not a fan of the genre. Just concentrate on that voice."

== Track listing ==
Side one
No.	Title	Writer(s)	Length
1.	"Welcome to the Club"	Philip Bailey, Bobby Nunn, Donna Weiss	4:45
2.	"State of the Heart"	Mic Murphy, Paul Pesco	4:57
3.	"Long Distance Love"	Bobby Nunn	3:51
4.	"Echo My Heart"	Kathy Kurasch, Weiss, Lauren Wood	4:05
5.	"Don't Leave Me Baby"	Nile Rodgers	4:18

Side two
No.	Title	Writer(s)	Length
6.	"Special Effect"	Bailey, Rodgers	3:42
7.	"Because of You"	Bailey, Phil Collins, George Duke, Nathan East, Lorelei McBroom, Ray Parker Jr.	4:29
8.	"Back It Up"	Bailey, Collins, Duke, East, Parker Jr., Rodgers	3:56
9.	"Take This with You"	Bailey, Keithen Carter, Bruce Gaitsch, Patrick Leonard	4:49
10.	"The Day Will Come"	Gerard McMahon	4:10

== Personnel ==
=== Musicians ===
- Philip Bailey – lead vocals, backing vocals (1, 3–10), vocoder (1)
- Kevin Jones – Synclavier programming and sequencing
- Nile Rodgers – keyboards (1–4, 6, 9), guitars (1–6, 8–10), vocoder (1), horns (1), backing vocals (1, 6, 8), bass guitar (2–4, 6, 9), string arrangements and conductor (2, 7, 8)
- George Duke – acoustic piano (7), keyboards (8)
- Peter Scherer – keyboards (10)
- Ray Parker Jr. – guitar (7, 8)
- Rick Robbins – guitar (7)
- Jeff Beck – guitar (8)
- Darryl Jones – bass guitar (1, 10)
- Nathan East – bass guitar (7, 8)
- Omar Hakim – drums (1, 10), percussion (1)
- Jimmy Bralower – drums, percussion and sequencing (2–6, 9)
- Phil Collins – drums (7, 8), percussion (7)
- Steve Elson – saxophone (3)
- Gene Orloff – concertmaster (2, 7, 8)
- Tawatha Agee – backing vocals (1)
- Curtis King Jr. – backing vocals (1, 3, 5, 8, 9)
- Carl Carwell – backing vocals (1, 3, 5, 9, 10)
- Brenda White-King – backing vocals (1, 7)
- Michelle Cobbs – backing vocals (2, 8)
- Diane Garisto – backing vocals (2, 8)
- Lorelei McBroom – backing vocals (6, 7)
- Fonzi Thornton – backing vocals (8)

Production

- Larkin Arnold – executive producer
- Nile Rodgers – producer
- Philip Bailey – producer (7, 8)
- James Farber – mixing, recording (1–6, 9, 10)
- George Massenburg – recording (7, 8)
- Scott Ansell – second engineer (1–6, 9, 10)
- Knut Bohn – second engineer (1–6, 9, 10)
- Jon Goldberger – additional second engineer (1–6, 9, 10)
- Steve Chase – second engineer (7, 8)
- Bob Ludwig – mastering at Masterdisk (New York, NY)
- Kevin Jones – production manager
- Budd Tunick – production manager
- Lane/Donald – art direction
- Dennis Keeley – photography

== Charts ==
Chart (1986)	Peak position
Dutch Album Top 100	74
German Pop Albums	65
Sweden (Sverigetopplistan)	30
Swiss Hitparade	29
US Top Pop Albums (Billboard)	84
US Top R&B Albums (Billboard)	30
