= You Got Me Rocking =

1994 single by the Rolling Stones

Single by the Rolling Stones

from the album Voodoo Lounge
- B-side: "Jump on Top of Me"
- Released: 26 September 1994
- Length: 3:36
- Label: Rolling Stones; Virgin
- Songwriter: Jagger/Richards
- Producers: Don Was; the Glimmer Twins

The Rolling Stones singles chronology
"Out of Tears" (1994)	"You Got Me Rocking" (1994)	"I Go Wild" (1995)

Music video
- "You Got Me Rocking" on YouTube

"You Got Me Rocking" is a song by English rock and roll band the Rolling Stones from their twentieth studio album, Voodoo Lounge (1994). The song was written by Jagger/Richards and produced by Don Was and the Glimmer Twins. It was released as a single in the UK in September 1994 by Rolling Stones Records/Virgin Records, where it reached No. 23 on the UK Singles Chart. It was also released as a single in the United States, reaching number 13 on the Billboard Bubbling Under Hot 100 chart in 1995. A recording from the 1997–1998 Bridges to Babylon Tour opened the 1998 live album No Security. It was also included on the Stones' 2002 career retrospective, Forty Licks.

== Background and composition ==
Begun early in 1993, "You Got Me Rocking" was initially a blues flavoured number; bootlegs have Jagger and Richards working the song as a slower, blues flavoured ramble, with Jagger shouting the hook "you got me rocking". Changed to a straightforward rocker in the vein of "Start Me Up", the song quickly evolved as Richards made the transition from piano to guitar. The lyrics moved to a more upbeat tone, as singer Mick Jagger presents redemption from a series of career ending instances of various professionals:

I was a hooker losing her looks; I was a writer can't write another book;
I was all dried up dying to get wet; I was a tycoon drowning in debt.

The lyrics can be interpreted as an answer to the Rolling Stones' critics, who often deride the band for their advancing age. Recording on "You Got Me Rocking" lasted from mid-summer to early winter 1993, when final touches were put on.

== Critical reception ==
Larry Flick from Billboard magazine wrote, "The Stones' signature sound is contorted into a rave-spiced disco twirler, thanks to imaginative touch of U.K. producer Paul Oakenfold, who enhances the hook and Mick Jagger's vocal with an urgent bassline and sparkling synths. Already sparking airplay on import, this festive single wisely acknowledges youth-oriented trends at street level, which should help Virgin entice widespread top 40 and crossover programmer support."

== Live performances ==
"You Got Me Rocking" is notable as one of the few latter-day songs from the band's career to remain on their setlist long after being released. The song was performed some 50 times during the 2005–2006 A Bigger Bang Tour.

== B-side ==
The B-side is the little-known "Jump on Top of Me", which also appears on the soundtrack to Prêt-à-Porter. "You Got Me Rocking" appeared on the soundtrack to The Replacements in 2000.

== Track listings ==
- 7-inch VS1518
1. "You Got Me Rocking"
2. "Jump on Top of Me"
- Cassette VSC1518
1. "You Got Me Rocking"
2. "Jump on Top of Me"
- CD VSCDE1518
1. "You Got Me Rocking"
2. "Jump on Top of Me"
- CD VSCDT1518
1. "You Got Me Rocking"
2. "Jump on Top of Me"
3. "You Got Me Rocking" (Perfecto Mix)
4. "You Got Me Rocking" (Sexy Disco Dub Mix)
- CD VSCDG1518 - digipak
1. "You Got Me Rocking"
2. "Jump on Top of Me"
3. "You Got Me Rocking" (Perfecto Mix)
4. "You Got Me Rocking" (Sexy Disco Dub Mix)

== Personnel ==
According to the authors Philippe Margotin and Jean-Michel Guesdon.

The Rolling Stones

- Mick Jagger – lead vocals, maracas
- Keith Richards – rhythm guitar, "mystery guitar", backing vocals
- Ronnie Wood – slide guitar
- Charlie Watts – drums

Additional personnel

- Darryl Jones – bass
- Chuck Leavell – Wurlitzer piano
- Bernard Fowler, Ivan Neville – background vocals

Technical

- Don Was, The Glimmer Twins – producers
- Don Smith – engineer
- Dan Bosworth, Alastair McMillan – assistant engineers
- Mike Baumgartner, Greg Goldman, Ed Korengo – mixers

== Charts ==
=== Weekly charts ===
Chart (1994–1995)	Peak position
Australia (ARIA)	64
Belgium (Ultratop 50 Flanders)	29
Europe (European Hit Radio)	36
Iceland (Íslenski Listinn Topp 40)	10
Netherlands (Dutch Top 40)	35
Netherlands (Single Top 100)	39
Scotland Singles (Official Charts)	16
UK Singles (Official Charts)	23
UK Airplay (Music Week)	21
UK Dance (Music Week)	6
UK Club Chart (Music Week)	4
US Bubbling Under Hot 100 (Billboard)	13
US Mainstream Rock (Billboard)	2

=== Year-end charts ===
Chart (1994)	Position
US Album Rock Tracks (Billboard)	32

== Release history ==
Region	Date	Format(s)	Label(s)	Ref(s).
United Kingdom	26 September 1994	7-inch vinyl; 12-inch vinyl; CD; cassette	Rolling Stones; Virgin	
Australia	17 October 1994	CD; cassette	Rolling Stones; Virgin	
Japan	2 November 1994	Mini-CD; maxi-CD	Rolling Stones; Virgin	
