= Spot Welders =

Television editorial house

- Bronze model of the Spot Welders logo
- Industry: Post Production
- Founded: 1993
- Headquarters: Venice, California
- Website: www.spotwelders.com

Spot Welders is a film and television editorial house.

== Works ==
Spot Welders' credits include music videos and commercials as well as feature films. The company and its editors earned numerous awards for music videos and commercials. Spot Welders' Ameriquest Concert spot was nominated for an Emmy, and was awarded a Silver Lion at Cannes and a gold award at The One Show.

Music video projects include:

- "Losing My Religion", R.E.M. (1991)
  - MTV Video Music Awards 1991, Best Editing. Robert Duffy, Editor
- "Man on the Moon", R.E.M. (1993)
  - MTV Video Music Awards 1993, Best Editing, nominated. Robert Duffy, Editor
- "Love Is Strong", Rolling Stones (1994)
- "Scream", Michael Jackson and Janet Jackson(1995)
- "99 Problems", Jay-Z (2004)
- "Freak on a Leash", Korn (1999)
- John Mellencamp “Just Another Day”
- Paul Oakenfold “Ready Steady Go”
- Counting Crows “A Long December”
- The Wallflowers “Sleepwalker”
- Madonna "What It Feels Like for a Girl"

Commercial projects include:

- Calvin Klein "Escape"
- Gatorade "Big Head"
- Acura "Dance"
- Old Spice "Hungry Like the Bruce"
- Verizon "Glory"
- Drakkar Noir "Rock Star"

Spot Welders has worked on various feature films, including:

- Thumbsucker (2005) Director: Mike Mills
- Of All the Things (2008) Jody Lambert, Documentary
- Sleepwalkers (2007) Doug Aitken, Series of Art Films
- Paperboys (2001) Director Mike Mills
- Southlander (2001) Director Steve Hanft
- Deformer (2000) Director: Mike Mills Documentary
