= What's Inside =

Studio album by Joan Armatrading
- Released: 30 May 1995
- Studios: A&M, Hollywood; Abbey Road, London; Record Plant, Sausalito; Kiva, Memphis
- Genre: Pop
- Length: 50:17
- Label: RCA
- Producers: Joan Armatrading, David Tickle

Joan Armatrading chronology
Square the Circle (1992)	What's Inside (1995)	Lovers Speak (2003)

What's Inside is the fourteenth studio album by British singer-songwriter Joan Armatrading. The album was written, arranged and produced by Armatrading, co-produced by David Tickle and recorded at the A&M Recording Studios in Hollywood. The strings were recorded at Abbey Road Studios, London, with the Kronos Quartet's contribution recorded at The Plant Recording Studios, Sausalito, California and The Memphis Horns recorded at Kiva Recording Studio, Memphis, Tennessee. The album was released in 1995 by RCA and was Armatrading's only album for the label. She had left A&M in 1992 after an eighteen-year association with the company.

== Background ==
Armatrading used a string orchestra on several tracks. She used the London Metropolitan Orchestra, along with the Kronos Quartet on one track and The Memphis Horns on two songs. Because of this, the album had several arrangers (see Personnel list) including Armatrading herself.

B. J. Cole returned to play slide guitar, the first time he had played on an Armatrading album since 1976, when he played on the track "Down to Zero" from the eponymous Joan Armatrading album; and Manu Katché once more returned to play drums. After a twelve-year gap, Tony Levin reprised his role as one of the album's bass guitarists – he had previously played on Walk Under Ladders in 1981 and The Key in 1983. Other than those, Armatrading and her co-producer David Tickle worked with a new set of musicians for the album, including some very experienced artists guesting on several tracks, such as Darryl Jones, who had worked with Miles Davis and Eric Clapton, among others, and who went on to join the Rolling Stones; Greg Phillinganes, a keyboardist who had worked with Stevie Wonder, Eric Clapton, Donna Summer, Aretha Franklin and many others, and Benmont Tench of Tom Petty and the Heartbreakers.

== Songs ==
In an interview in December 1995 in the Los Angeles Times, Armatrading stated that the album's songs represent "things that have touched me".

The song "In Your Eyes" is one of several songs with jazz influences. "Everyday Boy" was inspired by an acquaintance of Armatrading's who had AIDS. "Shapes and Sizes", which contains the line "Obituary columns are filled with love", was inspired by the death of British journalist and broadcaster Brian Redhead.

"Back On The Road" and "Lost The Love" are blues numbers and prefigure her 2007 album Into The Blues. "Trouble" is a "heartwarming salute" to Armatrading's mother, whom she had always regarded as a strong woman whom she wished to emulate.

The tracks "Everyday Boy", "Recommend My Love" and "Shapes and Sizes" were released as singles.

== Reception ==
The album was positively reviewed by most critics and reached number 48 in the UK Albums Chart, and number 91 in Australia, but did not chart in the US.

AllMusic's Thom Jurek said that the album was: "a solid, sweeping, elegant, and heart breaking album" that "proved beyond any doubt that Armatrading [is] a viable, profound songwriter capable of offering striking, imagistic portraits of complex emotional terrain", that there was "not a weak song" among the tracks and that in his opinion the album is "highly recommended". He singled out "Merchant of Love", "Everyday Boy", and "Recommend My Love" as the "finest songs" on the album.

William Ruhlmann of AllMusic commented: "the album is an interesting mixture of the styles Armatrading has employed at various times in her career, from the spare, intimate approach associated with her "Love And Affection" phase to the pop-rock of "Me Myself I". He singled out the track "Can't Stop Loving You" as the song that "coulda-been-a-hit". The album received a rating of 4 out of 5 stars on the site.

John Roos of the Los Angeles Times called the album a "strong collection" with some "outstanding" songs, and particularly praised "Trouble".

Steve Appleford of the Los Angeles Times praised the album's "subtle emotional ambience" and "raw, smoky intensity".

A. D. Amorosi, writing in the Philadelphia City Paper, praised Armatrading's vocals as being "espresso dark, cigar smoky, hearty and passionate", and said that the album "contains deceptively simple melodies trimmed with ornate baubles, including the laconic blues of "Lost the Love" and the ominously catchy "Shapes & Sizes".

== Track listing ==
All songs written and arranged by Joan Armatrading. Additional arrangements by other personnel as noted below.

1. "In Your Eyes" – 2:43
2. "Everyday Boy" – 4:37
3. "Merchant of Love" – 4:49
4. "Shapes and Sizes" – 3:15
5. "Back on the Road" – 2:43
6. "Lost the Love" – 3:43
7. "Songs" – 3:49
8. "Would You Like to Dance" – 4:01
9. "Recommend My Love" – 4:30
10. "Beyond the Blue" – 3:52
11. "Can't Stop Loving You" – 3:26
12. "Shape of a Pony" – 4:43
13. "Trouble" – 4:06

== Personnel ==
Musicians

- Joan Armatrading – vocals, electric guitar, acoustic guitar, e-bow guitar
- Hojah Farah – acoustic guitar (track 4)
- B. J. Cole – slide guitar (track 10)
- Tony Levin – bass guitar (tracks 1, 2, 3, 4, 5, 7, 11, 12, 13)
- Darryl Jones – bass guitar (tracks 2, 8, 9, 10)
- Greg Phillinganes – keyboards (tracks 1, 7, 9)
- Benmont Tench – keyboards (tracks 2, 3, 5, 10, 11, 12)
- Todd Cochran – keyboards (tracks 4, 6, 13)
- Peter Robinson – keyboards (track 8)
- Manu Katché – drums (all tracks)
- Alex Acuña – percussion (tracks 3, 4, 6, 7, 10, 11, 12,13)
- The London Metropolitan Orchestra – strings (all tracks except track 4)
- Kronos Quartet – strings (track 4)
- Boz Burrell – tin whistle (track 12)
- Memphis Horns – horns (tracks 8, 11)
- K. La – backing vocals (tracks 3, 6, 8, 9, 11)
- Ray Williams – backing vocals (tracks 3, 6, 8, 9, 11)
- Terry Evans – backing vocals (tracks 3, 6, 8, 9, 11)
- Willie Green Jr. – backing vocals (tracks 3, 6, 8, 9, 11)

Production

- Producer: Joan Armatrading
- Co-producer: David Tickle
- Engineer: Wolfgang Amadeus
- Second engineer: Chad Munsey
- Engineer (horns): Malcolm Springer
- Engineer (quartet): Tom Luekens
- Engineer (strings): Simon Rhodes
- Mixed by David Tickle, Shelly Yakus
- Musical director: Andy Brown
- Songs arranged by: Joan Armatrading
- Strings arranged by: Joan Armatrading (tracks 2, 3, 5, 6, 7, 8, 9, 10, 11, 12,13)
- Strings arranged by: Caroline Dale (track 1)
- Strings arranged by: Dana Brayton (track 4)
- Orchestration by: Caroline Dale
- Strings written by: Joan Armatrading (tracks 2, 3, 5, 6, 7, 8, 9, 10, 11, 12,13)
- Strings written by: Caroline Dale (track 1)
- Design & illustration: Sherri Maxwell
- Distribution: Bertelsmann Music Group
- Songs published by Polygram Music
