= Voodoo Lounge =

Studio album by the Rolling Stones
- Released: 11 July 1994
- Recorded: September, 3 November – 11 December 1993
- Studios: Ronnie Wood's house, Windmill Lane Studios, Dublin; mixed and overdubbed at A&M Studios, Los Angeles and Right Track Recording, NYC
- Genres: Hard rock; blues rock; roots rock
- Length: 62:08
- Label: Virgin
- Producers: Don Was, the Glimmer Twins

The Rolling Stones chronology
Jump Back: The Best of The Rolling Stones (1993)	Voodoo Lounge (1994)	Stripped (1995)

The Rolling Stones studio album chronology
Steel Wheels (1989)	Voodoo Lounge (1994)	Bridges to Babylon (1997)

Singles from Voodoo Lounge
- 1. "Love Is Strong" Released: 4 July 1994; 2. "Out of Tears" Released: September 1994; 3. "You Got Me Rocking" Released: 26 September 1994; 4. "I Go Wild" Released: 3 April 1995

Voodoo Lounge is the twentieth British and twenty-second American studio album by the English rock band the Rolling Stones, released on 11 July 1994. The album was the band's first release under their new alliance with Virgin Records and their first studio album in five years, since Steel Wheels in 1989. Voodoo Lounge is also the band's first album without original bassist Bill Wyman, who left the band in early 1991, though the Stones did not announce his departure until two years later. In 2009, the album was remastered and reissued by Universal Music. This album was released as a double LP on vinyl and as a single CD and cassette.

After the departure of Wyman, the Stones chose not to officially replace him as a band member and continued as a four-piece with Mick Jagger (vocals), Charlie Watts (drums), Keith Richards and Ronnie Wood (both guitars). Wyman was unofficially replaced by Darryl Jones, who performed with the Stones in the studio and on tour as a contracted player. Keyboards were provided by Chuck Leavell. Jones and Leavell, though not band members, would remain collaborators with the group from that point on. Don Was was brought in to produce the album alongside Jagger and Richards.

Voodoo Lounge sold well, reaching either Gold or Platinum status in several countries, but failed to produce a US top 40 hit. The songs "Love Is Strong" and "You Got Me Rocking" peaked at Nos. 14 and 23 in the UK, respectively, and "You Got Me Rocking" became a staple on most subsequent Stones tours. The album received several positive reviews and won the inaugural Grammy Award for Best Rock Album in 1995.

== Background ==
Following the release of Keith Richards' Main Offender and Mick Jagger's Wandering Spirit respectively in 1992 and 1993, both leaders of the Rolling Stones began composing new songs in April 1993, deciding upon Don Was as co-producer for the upcoming sessions. In November, after rehearsing and recording at Ronnie Wood's house in Ireland that September, the Stones shifted to Windmill Lane Studios in Dublin and began cutting Voodoo Lounge. Although not joining the band officially, Darryl Jones would be taking Bill Wyman's place as the group's regular bassist, at the suggestion of drummer Charlie Watts.

Don Was, noted for his retro rock production sensibilities, was reportedly responsible for pushing the band towards more conventional territory in an attempt to reproduce the archetypal "Rolling Stones" sound. Although this approach pleased critics and the Stones rock-oriented fan base, Jagger in particular expressed some dissatisfaction with Was's aesthetic, commenting in a 1995 interview with Rolling Stone:

... there were a lot of things that we wrote for Voodoo Lounge that Don steered us away from: groove songs, African influences and things like that. And he steered us very clear of all that. And I think it was a mistake.

Was responded that he was not "anti-groove, just anti-groove without substance, in the context of this album. They had a number of great grooves. But it was like, 'OK, what goes on top of it? Where does it go?' I just felt that it's not what people were looking for from the Stones. I was looking for a sign that they can get real serious about this, still play better than anybody and write better than anybody."

The result was an essentially classicist recording that drew on the blues, R&B, and country that had informed the Stones classic late 1960s/early 1970s recordings. Jagger would insist on a more diverse, contemporary production cast for the subsequent Bridges to Babylon (1997). After a period of recording in Los Angeles in the first few months of 1994, Voodoo Lounge was complete and the Rolling Stones moved onto the rehearsals for the Voodoo Lounge Tour, which would begin in August. In June, four of the songs were leaked and were played on radio station KRZZ, prompting Virgin to "keep the material off the air".

During the recording of the album, Richards adopted a stray cat in Barbados which he named Voodoo, because they were in Barbados, and the kitten had survived the odds. He dubbed the terrace of the house Voodoo's Lounge. "Sparks Will Fly" was written by Richards after a blow-up with Jerry Lee Lewis in Ireland. Richards invited Lewis to Wood's home to jam on a few songs. Lewis took it seriously and thought they were making an album, and upon playback of the session, he started to pick apart Richards' band, which outraged Richards.

== Release and reception ==
Professional ratings
Initial reviews (in 1994)
Review scores
Source	Rating
Christgau's Consumer Guide	(2-star Honorable Mention)
Entertainment Weekly	C+; originally B
Los Angeles Times	3/4 stars
Music Week	4/5 stars
Q	3/5 stars
Rolling Stone	4/5 stars
Select	1/5 medals
Vox	8/10

Professional ratings
Retrospective reviews (after 1994)
Review scores
Source	Rating
AllMusic	3.5/5 stars
The Rolling Stone Album Guide	3/5 stars
Tom Hull	B+ (*)

Released in July 1994, Voodoo Lounge received generally positive reviews and debuted at No. 1 in the UK (their first chart-topper there since 1980's Emotional Rescue) and No. 2 in the US (behind the soundtrack to The Lion King) where it went double platinum.

David Cavanagh of Q Magazine wrote that "musically, these 15 songs represent the Stones at their all-time least newsworthy," adding that "Voodoo Lounge is no classic, but nor is it the resounding hound it could have been." Though he was disappointed in the inconsistency of the album's second half, he called the trio of opening rockers "exuberant and on the warm side" despite their lyric shortcomings and hailed the next four songs as an extremely good stretch with "Out of Tears" in particular showing "tantalizing glimmers of genius".

Writing for Vox magazine in August 1994, Steven Dalton thought that the album's strongest tracks were filled with "echoes of the band's halcyon days", most notably 1972's Exile on Main Street and 1978's Some Girls. He went on to surmise that Voodoo Lounge "reminds us why we liked the Stones in the first place," and singled out "New Faces", "Out of Tears" and "Blinded by Rainbows" as the album's highlights, despite also stating that the record contained "too many sketchy, arsing-around-in-the-studio jobs" to be considered one of the group's overall best albums.

Jon Pareles of The New York Times found Voodoo Lounge to be disappointing, arguing that the album "rings hollow, as if it were made not to shake things up but simply to fuel the machine." He harshly criticized the songwriting, arguing that "for much of the album, Jagger and Richards seem determined to write the most generic love songs possible... Flip over the sentimentality, and the Stones offer some of their least convincing leers."

Robert Christgau didn't believe the album warranted a full review, consigning it to his column's list of "honorable mentions" and commenting only that the Stones had become the "world's greatest roots-rock band". Tom Hull similarly listed it as an "honorable mention," conceding that the album "feels like they're just going through the motions".

Alexis Petridis of The Guardian would later rank Voodoo Lounge as one of their weakest albums, writing that "this isn't a bad album, exactly, but it sounds as if hard work was involved, the product of craft rather inspiration: tough coming from a band that, at their best, made it all seem effortless." Petridis also felt that the 62-minute album was much too long, joking that "it goes on for about six weeks." David Marchese of New York expressed a similar criticism, writing that Voodoo Lounge "would’ve killed at 45 minutes" while pointing out the weakest songs as he reviewed the album track-by-track.

In early 1995, while the Voodoo Lounge Tour was still underway until August, Voodoo Lounge won the Grammy Award for Best Rock Album.

In 2009, Voodoo Lounge was remastered and reissued by Universal Music.

== Singles ==
"Love Is Strong", which was inspired by Richards' solo "Wicked as It Seems", was released as the first single, reaching No. 14 in the UK. However, although the track was a hit on US rock radio, it stalled on the singles chart at No. 91, and (at least in the US) became the Rolling Stones' worst performing lead single from an album up to that time. Two follow-up US singles also received strong rock radio airplay, but failed to cross over into top-40 hits: "Out of Tears" peaked at No. 60, and "You Got Me Rocking" fared even worse, peaking at No. 113. Consequently, Voodoo Lounge would be the first Rolling Stones album to not produce significant hits in the US, even with two million copies sold. In the UK, "Love Is Strong", "You Got Me Rocking", "Out of Tears", and "I Go Wild" were all top-40 chart hits.

=== Legacy ===
Sections of the Keith Richards song "Thru and Thru" from Voodoo Lounge are woven throughout the HBO television series The Sopranos' second-season finale "Funhouse" (episode no. 26 overall), and plays in its entirety during the episode's closing sequence and end credits.

The Voodoo Lounge Tour was the setting for most of a 1994 episode of Beverly Hills, 90210.

In July 2014, Guitar World placed Voodoo Lounge at number 42 in their "Superunknown: 50 Iconic Albums That Defined 1994" list.

=== Rolling Stones Voodoo Lounge CD ROM ===
An interactive CD-ROM titled Rolling Stones Voodoo Lounge CD ROM was published by GTE Interactive Media in 1995, to mixed reception. It uses early QuickTime video technology for Windows 3.1 and Macintosh.

== Track listing ==
All tracks are written by Mick Jagger and Keith Richards.

Voodoo Lounge track listing
No.	Title	Length
1.	"Love Is Strong"	3:46
2.	"You Got Me Rocking"	3:34
3.	"Sparks Will Fly"	3:14
4.	"The Worst"	2:24
5.	"New Faces"	2:50
6.	"Moon Is Up"	3:41
7.	"Out of Tears"	5:25
8.	"I Go Wild"	4:19
9.	"Brand New Car"	4:13
10.	"Sweethearts Together"	4:46
11.	"Suck on the Jugular"	4:26
12.	"Blinded by Rainbows"	4:33
13.	"Baby Break It Down"	4:07
14.	"Thru and Thru"	5:59
15.	"Mean Disposition"	4:09

Note: "Mean Disposition" was included only on CD in 1994, but is also featured on the 2010 vinyl (2xLP) release. It was also included on 2024 30th anniversary 2 LP vinyl release.

== Personnel ==
The Rolling Stones

- Mick Jagger – lead vocals (all except 4, 14), backing vocals (1–4, 8–11, 13–14), guitars (5, 7–12), harmonica (1, 6, 11), percussion (1–2, 6)
- Keith Richards – guitars (all tracks), backing vocals (1–3, 5, 8–14), lead vocals (4, 14), tambourine (6), bass guitar (9), piano (13–14)
- Ronnie Wood – guitars (all except 4–6, 9–10, 13), pedal steel (4, 6, 10, 13), lap steel (10), backing vocals (11)
- Charlie Watts – drums, tambourine (5)

Additional personnel

- Darryl Jones – bass guitar (all tracks, except 9, 10)
- Chuck Leavell – Wurlitzer piano (1), piano (2, 4, 7, 9, 15), harpsichord (5), harmonium (5, 6), Hammond B-3 organ (8, 10), backing vocals
- Bernard Fowler – backing vocals (1–3, 6, 8–11, 13–14)
- Frankie Gavin – fiddle (4), pennywhistle (5)
- Mark Isham – trumpet (9, 11)
- Luís Jardim – percussion (9–11), shaker (5)
- Flaco Jimenez – accordion (10)
- Phil Jones – percussion (8)
- David McMurray – saxophone (9, 11)
- Ivan Neville – backing vocals (1–2, 8–11, 13–14), Hammond B-3 organ (11, 13)
- Benmont Tench – Hammond B-3 organ (7), Hammond C-3 organ (12), piano (12), accordion (6)
- Bobby Womack – backing vocals (6)
- Max Baca – bajo sexto (10)
- Lenny Castro – percussion (7, 9, 11–12)
- Pierre de Beauport – acoustic guitar (14)
- David Campbell – string arrangement (7)

== Charts ==
=== Weekly charts ===
1994 weekly chart performance for Voodoo Lounge
Chart (1994)	Peak position
Australian Albums (ARIA)	1
Belgian Albums (Ultratop Flanders)	13
Belgian Albums (Ultratop Wallonia)	26
Austrian Albums (Ö3 Austria)	1
Canada Top Albums/CDs (RPM)	1
Dutch Albums (Album Top 100)	1
Finland (The Official Finnish Charts)	3
French Albums (SNEP)	2
German Albums (Offizielle Top 100)	1
Hungarian Albums (MAHASZ)	20
Italian Albums (Musica e Dischi)	4
Japanese Albums (Oricon)	2
New Zealand Albums (RMNZ)	1
Norwegian Albums (VG-lista)	3
Spanish Albums (PROMUSICAE)	6
Swedish Albums (Sverigetopplistan)	2
Swiss Albums (Schweizer Hitparade)	1
UK Albums (Official Charts)	1
US Billboard 200	2

=== Year-end charts ===
1994 year-end chart performance for Voodoo Lounge
Chart (1994)	Position
Australian Albums (ARIA)	73
Austrian Albums (Ö3 Austria Top 40)	18
Canada Top Albums/CDs (RPM)	13
Dutch Albums (Album Top 100)	29
French Albums (SNEP)	28
Japanese Albums Chart	105
Swiss Albums (Schweizer Hitparade)	31
US Billboard 200	62

1995 year-end chart performance for Voodoo Lounge
Chart (1995)	Position
German Albums (GfK Entertainment Charts)	50

== Certifications and sales ==
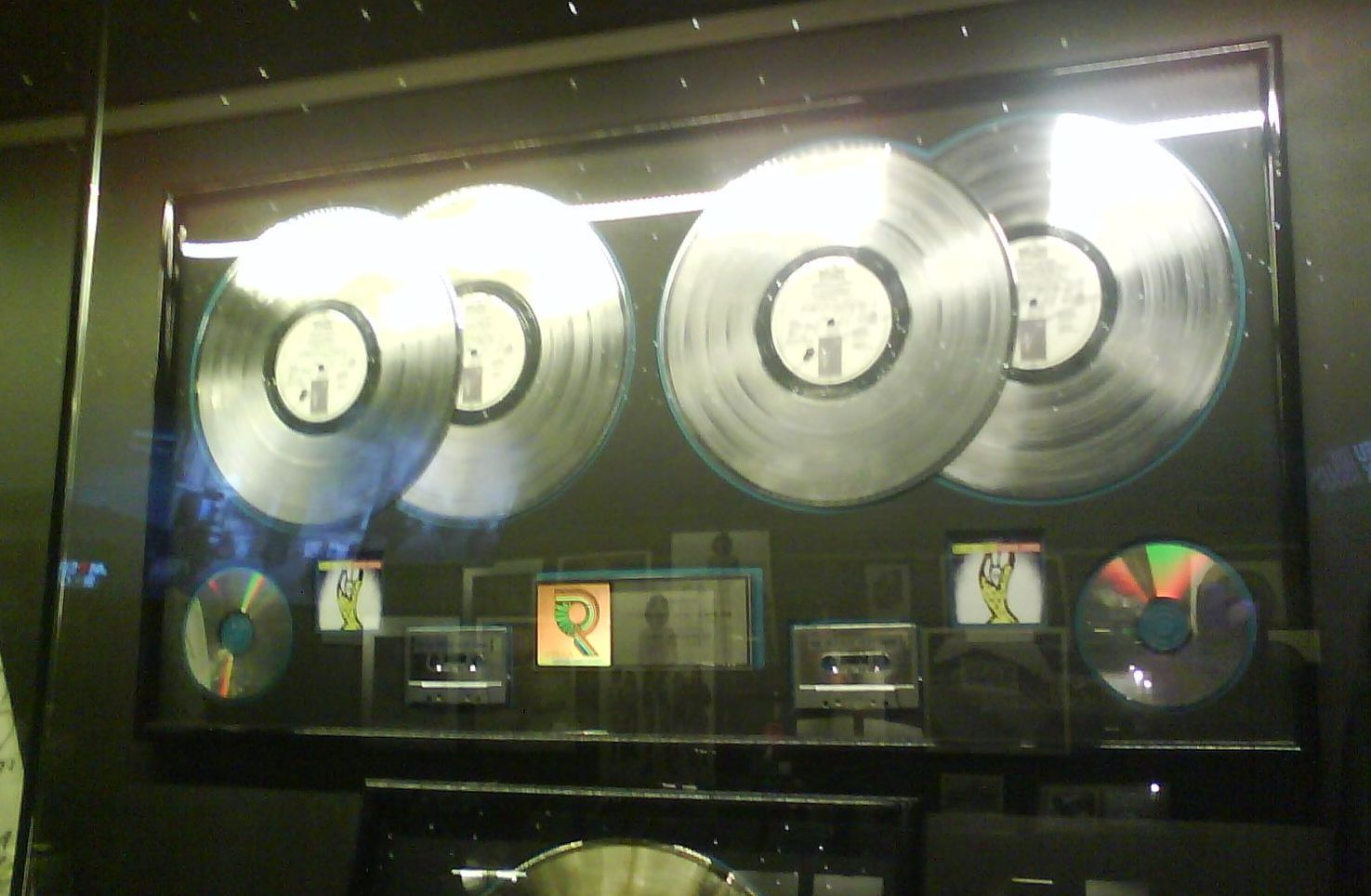
Multi platinum award

Certifications and sales for Voodoo Lounge
Region	Certification	Certified units/sales
Argentina (CAPIF)	2× Platinum	120,000^{^}
Australia (ARIA)	Gold	35,000^{^}
Austria (IFPI Austria)	Gold	25,000^{*}
Belgium (BRMA)	Gold	25,000^{*}
Canada (Music Canada)	3× Platinum	300,000^{^}
France (SNEP)	2× Gold	200,000^{*}
Germany (BVMI)	Platinum	500,000^{^}
Ireland (IRMA)	Silver	5,000
Italy	—	250,000
Japan (RIAJ)	Gold	172,410
Mexico (AMPROFON)	Platinum	250,000^{^}
Netherlands (NVPI)	Platinum	100,000^{^}
New Zealand (RMNZ)	Gold	7,500^{^}
Norway (IFPI Norway)	Gold	25,000^{*}
Spain (Promusicae)	Gold	50,000^{^}
Sweden (GLF)	Gold	50,000^{^}
Switzerland (IFPI Switzerland)	Gold	25,000^{^}
United Kingdom (BPI)	Gold	100,000^{^}
United States (RIAA)	2× Platinum	2,000,000^{^}
Summaries
Europe (IFPI)	Platinum	1,000,000^{*}
Worldwide	—	6,000,000
^{*} Sales figures based on certification alone.^{^} Shipments figures based on certification alone.
