= Square the Circle (Joan Armatrading album) =

Studio album by Joan Armatrading
- Released: 8 June 1992
- Recorded: Bumpkin
- Genre: Pop
- Length: 42:38
- Label: A&M
- Producer: Joan Armatrading

Joan Armatrading chronology
Hearts and Flowers (1990)	Square the Circle (1992)	What's Inside (1995)

Square the Circle is the thirteenth studio album by British singer-songwriter Joan Armatrading. It was released on 8 June 1992 by A&M Records and was Armatrading's last album for the company to whom she had been signed for almost 20 years. It includes her last top 75 entry in the UK Singles Chart to date, "Wrapped Around Her", which peaked at number 56.

== Background ==
The album was recorded at Bumpkin Studios, her own purpose-built studios. Ex-Japan bassist Mick Karn stayed on from her previous album, Hearts and Flowers, while Graham Dickson once again engineered the album, the third Armatrading album which he had been asked to engineer. Other personnel staying on were Jeremy Pearce who did the design work, while Andrew Catlin was once again asked to do the photography and Sarah Southin returned as a designer. The album is unusual in that Armatrading uses female backing singers. No female backing singers had appeared on an Armatrading album since her debut album Whatever's for Us in 1972, and those were not credited. Subsequent albums used exclusively male backing vocalists. The singers were Linda Lewis, her sister Shirley Lewis and Sylvia Mason-James, all experienced session singers. Linda Lewis had worked with numerous artists, including David Bowie, Cat Stevens and Rick Wakeman, while Sylvia Mason-James had worked with the Pet Shop Boys and Simple Minds, among others. The album's songs show a preoccupation with gender and male versus female characteristics.

The tracks "Wrapped Around Her" and "True Love" were released as singles.

== Reception ==
The album reached number 34 in the UK album charts and number 106 on the Australian charts.

AllMusic reviewer William Ruhlmann was critical of some of the sentiments on the album, singling out "If Women Ruled The World", for its lyrics which were perceived as misandrist. He did not comment on the musicianship. The album received a star rating of 3 out of 5 on the site.

Chris Heim, writing in the Chicago Tribune, noted that "her sound is pared down to direct, catchy pop-rock with only traces of the folk, reggae and jazz stylings that filled past albums" and that Armatrading "retains her touch for writing upbeat tunes that instantly burrow into memory and soft, low ballads that resonate with exquisite pain". He concluded that Armatrading "continues to be one of the most penetrating chroniclers of affairs of the heart in pop today".

== Track listing ==
All songs written and arranged by Joan Armatrading.

1. "True Love" – 3:57
2. "Crazy" – 3:48
3. "Wrapped Around Her" (Joan Armatrading, Graham Lyle) – 3:48
4. "Sometimes I Don't Wanna Go Home" – 4:59
5. "Square the Circle" – 4:10
6. "Weak Woman" – 3:56
7. "Can I Get Next to You" – 4:16
8. "Can't Get Over (How I Broke Your Heart)" – 3:56
9. "If Women Ruled the World" – 4:32
10. "Cradled in Your Love" – 5:16

== Personnel ==
Musicians

- Joan Armatrading – vocals, guitars, mandolin
- Simon Clark – keyboards (tracks 2, 4, 5, 8, 9, 10)
- Richard Cottle – keyboards (tracks 1, 3, 6, 7)
- Mick Karn – bass (all tracks)
- Richie Stevens – drums (all tracks)
- Luís Jardim – percussion (tracks 2, 4, 5, 9, 10)
- Andy Duncan – percussion, snare drum (tracks 7, 9)
- Linda Lewis – backing vocals (tracks 1, 3, 4, 6, 7, 8)
- Shirley Lewis – backing vocals (tracks 1, 3, 4, 5, 6, 7, 8)
- Sylvia Mason-James – backing vocals (tracks 1, 3, 4, 5, 6, 7, 8)

Production

- Producer: Joan Armatrading
- Engineers: Graham Dickson & Mike Ging
- Mixed by: Greg Jackman & Mike Ging
- Writer & co-producer (on "Wrapped Around Her"): Graham Lyle
- Design: Jeremy Pearce and Sarah Southin
- Photography: Andrew Catlin
- Calligraphy: Ruth Rowland
