= State of the Heart (Philip Bailey song) =

Single by Philip Bailey

from the album Inside Out
- B-side: "Take This With You"
- Released: April 1986
- Genre: R&B, soul
- Label: Columbia
- Songwriter(s): Mic Murphy, Paul Pesco
- Producer(s): Nile Rodgers

Philip Bailey singles chronology
| "Walking on the Chinese Wall" (1984) | "State of the Heart" (1986) |

"State of the Heart" is a song by American singer-songwriter Philip Bailey released as a single in April 1986 by Columbia Records. The song reached No. 20 on the Billboard Hot Black Singles chart.

== Overview ==
"State of the Heart" was produced by Nile Rodgers and composed by Mic Murphy and Paul Pesco. The single's B-side was "Take This with You". Both songs came from Bailey's 1986 album Inside Out.

== Critical reception ==
Thom Duffy of the Orlando Sentinel proclaimed that "playing a prominent bass riff on "State of the Heart," the LP's first single, (Nile) Rodgers sets the beat that's echoed by percussionist Jimmy Brawlower as Bailey sings of love prevailing over money". With a four out of five stars rating Paul Simper of Number One wrote "This time Philly's working with Nile "Material Girl" Rodgers and the going gets good and punchy. The sort of soul 'n' roll you can bounce on your sofa to in your undies. Ba-boinnngg." Carlo Wolff of the Boston Globe also called the song "contagious".
