= Darryl Jones =

American bassist (born 1961)

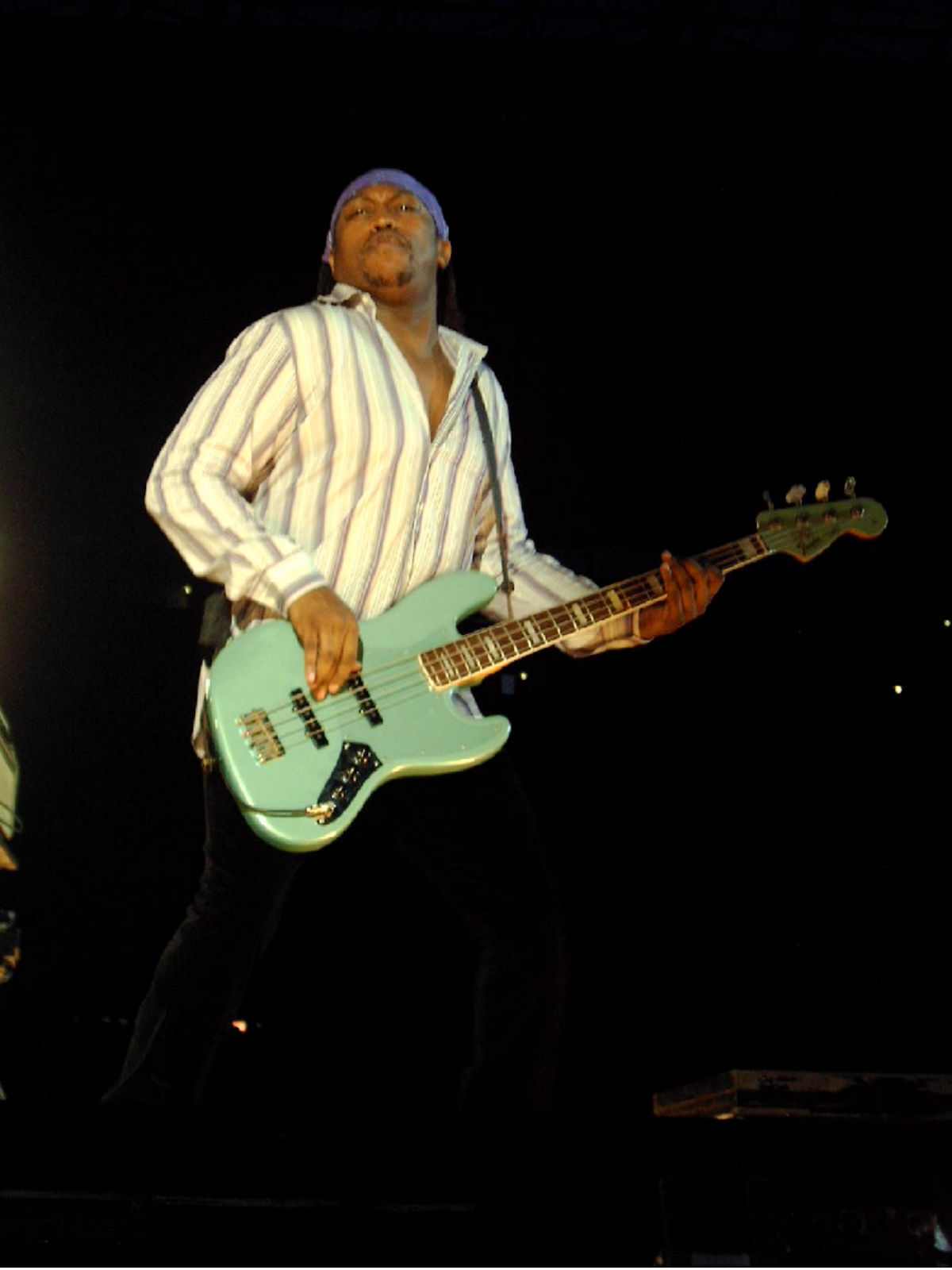

Background information
- Born: 11 December 1961 (age 64); Chicago, Illinois, U.S.
- Genres: Rock; blues-rock; jazz fusion; reggae; Pop
- Occupation: Bassist
- Years active: 1980–present
- Formerly of: Stone Raiders; The Dead Daisies
- Website: darryljones.com

Darryl Jones (born December 11, 1961) is an American bassist. He has been recording and touring with the Rolling Stones since 1993. He has also played in bands with Miles Davis and Sting, among others.

== Career ==
Darryl Jones was born on December 11, 1961 in Chicago, Illinois, on the city's south side. His father was a drummer and his mother frequently listened to soul music on the radio.

When Jones was seven, his father taught him how to play the drums and xylophone. When he was nine, he saw his neighbour Angus Thomas playing bass in a school talent show, which inspired him to switch to bass. He began studying under Thomas, Within a year, he performed with his brother at the next school talent show. His mother would drive him to gigs. After completing the music course at Chicago Vocational High School at 17, Jones started playing on Chicago music scene, playing alongside Vincent Wilburn Jr., Matthew Rose, and Perry Wilson. He attended Southern Illinois University Carbondale.

In 1985, he became a member of Sting's first solo band with Branford Marsalis, Kenny Kirkland, and Omar Hakim. With Sting he recorded the albums Dream of the Blue Turtles and Bring On the Night, and featured in the documentary of the band's formation and touring, also titled Bring On the Night.

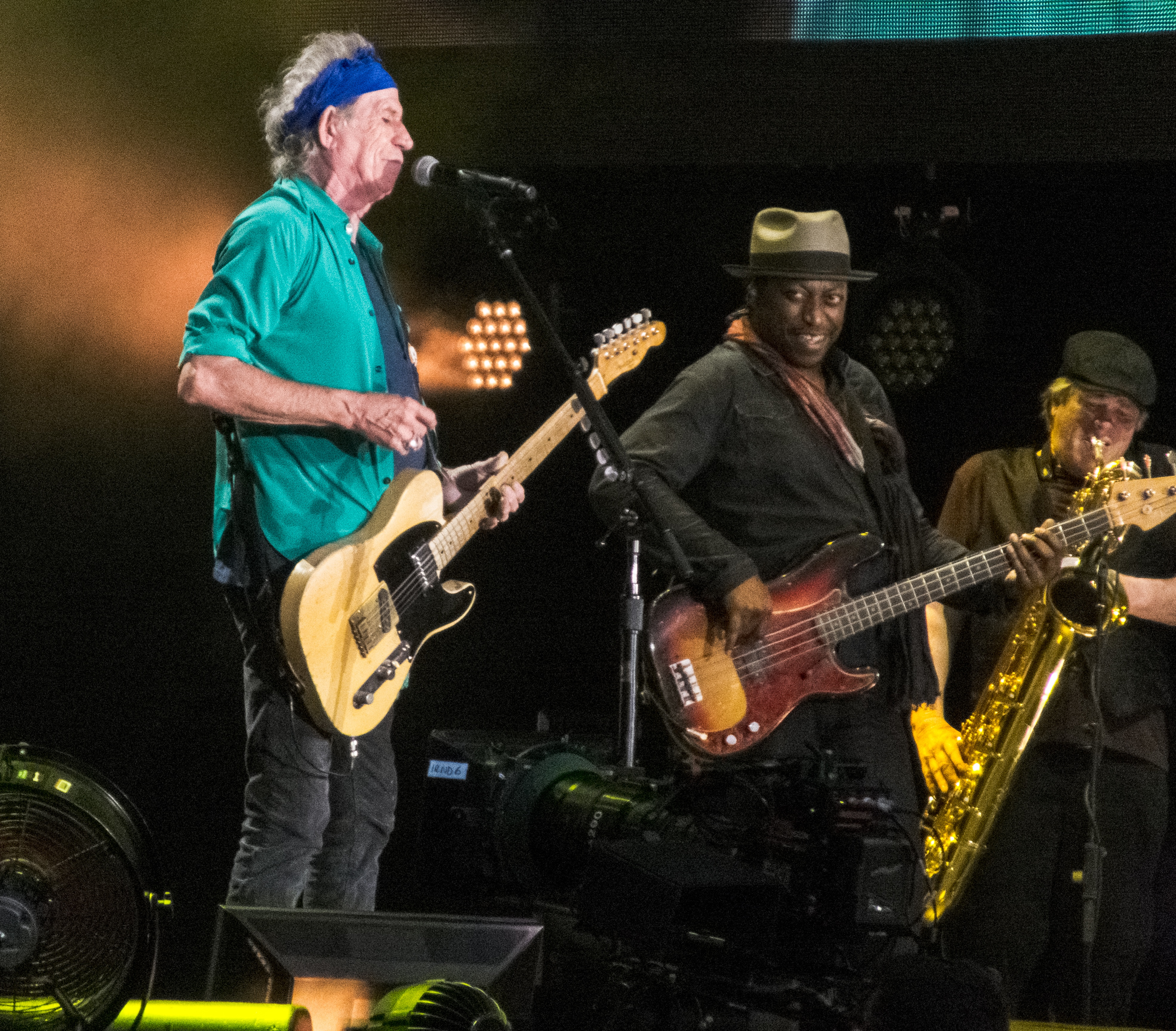
Keith Richards and Jones performing onstage with the Rolling Stones, July 6, 2013

In 1993, Jones auditioned to join the Rolling Stones after bassist Bill Wyman retired. He succeeded, touring with them in 1994. Jones has toured and recorded with the band since then.

He is working on a documentary about himself with Eric Hamburg.

== Collaborations ==
- Decoy – Miles Davis (Columbia Records, 1984)
- You're Under Arrest – Miles Davis (Columbia Records, 1985)
- The Dream of the Blue Turtles – Sting (A&M Records, 1985)
- Patti – Patti LaBelle (Philadelphia International Records, 1985)
- Inside Out – Philip Bailey (Columbia Records, 1986)
- Journeyman – Eric Clapton (Reprise Records, 1989)
- Finally Yours – Carmen Bradford (Amazing Records, 1992)
- Live in Tokyo – Steps Ahead (NYC, 1994) with Michael Brecker Mike Mainieri Mike Stern Steve Smith
- What's Inside – Joan Armatrading (RCA Records, 1995)
- Organic – Joe Cocker (Parlophone Records, 1996)
- Deuces Wild – B. B. King (MCA Records, 1997) alongside The Rolling Stones
- Soulbook – Rod Stewart (J Records, 2009)
- I Feel Like Playing – Ronnie Wood (Eagle Rock, 2010)
- Wild and Free – Ziggy Marley (Tuff Gong, 2011)
- Storytone – Neil Young (Reprise Records, 2014)
- Remnants – LeAnn Rimes (RCA Records, 2016)
- Awe – Alister Fawnwoda and Skream (2023)

=== With The Rolling Stones ===
- Voodoo Lounge (Virgin Records, 1994)
- Bridges to Babylon (Virgin Records, 1997)
- A Bigger Bang (Virgin Records, 2005)
- Blue & Lonesome (Polydor Records, 2016)
- Hackney Diamonds (Polydor Records, 2023)
- Foreign Tongues (Polydor Records, 2026)
