= Keisha White discography =

- Studio albums: 2
- Compilation albums: 1
- Singles: 10
- Music videos: 9
- Collaborations: 2

This is the discography of British R&B singer Keisha White, which so far consists of ten singles, two studio albums and one compilation album since her debut in 2005.

== Studio albums ==
Year	Album	Peak positions	
Year	Album	UK	UK R&B
2005	Seventeen: First studio album; Released: 7 March 2005; Label: Warner Music UK; Formats: CD, digital download	308	27
2006	Out of My Hands: Second studio album; Released: 3 July 2006; Label: Warner Music UK; Formats: CD, digital download, streaming	55	13

== Compilation albums ==
Year	Album
2020	The Hits In Me: Compilation album; Released: 6 March 2020; Label: Warner Music UK, X5 Music Group; Formats: Digital download, streaming

== Singles ==
Year	Title	Chart positions		Album
Year	Title	UK	UK R&B	Album
2004	"Watcha Gonna Do"	53	15	Non-album single
2005	"Don't Care Who Knows" (featuring Cassidy)	29	11	Seventeen
2005	"Don't Fool a Woman in Love"	90	18	Seventeen
2006	"The Weakness in Me"	17	6	Out of My Hands and Seventeen
2006	"Don't Mistake Me"	48	7	Out of My Hands
2006	"I Choose Life"	63	17	Out of My Hands
2010	"Wrong N Right"	—	—	Non-album singles
2012	"Butterflies"	—	—	Non-album singles
2018	"Crazy Love Story"	—	—	Non-album singles
2021	"Someday" (Tracy Beaker Theme Tune)	—	—	Non-album singles
"—" denotes releases that did not chart or were not released in that country.

== Collaborations ==
Year	Title	Chart positions	Album
Year	Title	UK	Album
2003	"The Harder They Come" (Oakenfold featuring Keisha White)	38	Bunkka
2003	"Bigger Better Deal" (Desert Eagle Discs featuring Keisha White)	67	Non-album single
