= No Love (disambiguation) =

"No Love" is a 2010 song by Eminem featuring Lil Wayne.

No Love may also refer to:

- No Love (film), a 1991 Soviet drama directed by Valery Rubinchik
- "No Love" (Summer Walker and SZA song), a song by Summer Walker and SZA, 2021
- "No Love" (Lucky J song), 2016
- "No Love" (Joan Armatrading song), 1981
- No Love (August Alsina song), 2014
- "No Love (I'm Not Used to)", a song by Kevon Edmonds, 1999
- "No Love", a song by Roots Manuva from Alternately Deep, 2006
- "No Love", a song by Death Grips from No Love Deep Web, 2012
- "No Love", a song by the Get Up Kids from Four Minute Mile, 1997
- "No Love", a song by Kevin Gates from By Any Means 2, 2017
- "No Love", a song by Lil Scrappy, 2012
- "No Love", a song by HIM from the album Tears on Tape, 2013
- "No Love", a song by Noriel, 2018
- "No Love", a song by Olivia O'Brien, 2017
- "No Love", a song by Simple Plan from Simple Plan, 2008
- "No Love", a song by Young M.A from Herstory in the Making, 2019
- "(I Guess There's) No Love", a song by Mable John, 1961
