= More than One Kind of Love =

1990 single by Joan Armatrading

Single by Joan Armatrading

from the album Hearts and Flowers
- B-side: "Love and Affection (live)"
- Released: 7 May 1990
- Length: 5:32 (album version); 4:37 (single version)
- Label: A&M
- Songwriter: Joan Armatrading
- Producer: Joan Armatrading

Joan Armatrading singles chronology
| "Stronger Love" (1988) | "More than One Kind of Love" (1990) | "Promise Land" (1990) |

"More than One Kind of Love" is a song by English singer-songwriter Joan Armatrading, released on 7 May 1990 by A&M Records as the lead single from her twelfth studio album, Hearts and Flowers (1990). The song, which was written and produced by Armatrading, reached number 75 in the UK singles chart.

== Background ==
"More than One Kind of Love" was inspired by the importance of friendship, with Armatrading singing to "someone who has forgotten about their friends" in favour of a new romantic interest. She told The Sun-Herald in 1990, "Basically what I'm saying is, alright you've fallen in love and you're on a high. You've ditched all your friends because you've found the ideal partner, but what happens when it normalises, which eventually it must do to make it work. What happens then? After a certain point people won't be there for you anymore."

== Release ==
"More than One Kind of Love" was released by A&M Records in the UK on 7 May 1990. The B-side of the 7-inch and cassette formats, "Love and Affection", was recorded live at the Hammersmith Odeon on 1 October 1988 and was taken from a Thames Television production, Joan Armatrading the Concert. The 12-inch and CD formats featured an additional track from the concert, "I'm Lucky", plus an album track from Hearts and Flowers, "Good Times".

== Promotion ==
A music video was filmed to accompany the single. In the US, it achieved play on the Record Guide and BET channels. In the UK, Armatrading also performed the song live on Wogan on 11 May 1990 and again on TV-am on 16 May 1990.

== Critical reception ==
Upon its release as a single, Penny Kiley of the Liverpool Echo described "More than One Kind of Love" as a "love song with a difference – a reminder than friendship is just as important as romance". She added, "The message comes over strongly with an arrangement that puts her voice first – and the voice is as distinctive, earnest and versatile as ever." The Newcastle Journal awarded a three out of four star rating, calling it an "upbeat love song about friendship" on which Armatrading "has lost none of her power". They noted how her "rich, full vocals build up to an anthem-like chorus". Chris Roberts, writing for Melody Maker, described the song as "unhip", but did note Armatrading sounded "positively effuglent" as she "sings with consummate versatility". David Giles of Music Week considered it to be a "disappointingly uninspired return, interesting only for the unmistakable bass work of Mick Karn".

== Track listings ==
7–inch single (UK and Australia) and cassette single (UK and US)

1. "More than One Kind of Love" – 4:37
2. "Love and Affection" (live at Hammersmith) – 5:03

12-inch and CD single (UK)

1. "More than One Kind of Love" – 4:37
2. "Good Times" – 4:25
3. "Love and Affection" (live at Hammersmith) – 5:03
4. "I'm Lucky" (live at Hammersmith) – 3:37

== Personnel ==
"More than One Kind of Love"

- Joan Armatrading – vocals
- Don Freeman – keyboards
- Mick Karn – bass
- Jamie Lane – drums
- Hossam Ramzy – percussion

Production

- Joan Armatrading – production ("More than One Kind of Love", "Good Times")
- Tom Lord-Alge – mixing ("More than One Kind of Love", "Good Times")
- Nick Bigsby – production ("Love and Affection", "I'm Lucky")

Other

- Andy Catlin – photography (portrait)
- Richard Haughton – photography (still life)
- Stylorouge – design

== Charts ==
=== Weekly charts ===
| Chart (1990) | Peak position |
|---|---|
| Australia (ARIA) | 125 |
| Italy Airplay (Music & Media) | 2 |
| UK Singles (OCC) | 75 |
