= Jero (South Korean singer) =

South Korean singer

Jero 전준용
- Also known as: J-Yo
- Born: Jeon Jun-yong; September 25, 1991 (age 34); Incheon, South Korea
- Genres: R&B; hip hop
- Occupation: Singer
- Instrument: Vocals
- Years active: 2010–present
- Labels: Independent (2022-present) BEYOND LOVE (2020-2021) Born to Color Records (2018-2019) Echo Global Group (2011-2018)
- Formerly of: Lucky J; Touch
- Website: www.echogg.com

- Korean name
- Hangul: 전준용
- RR: Jeon Junyong
- MR: Chŏn Chunyong

Stage name
- Hangul: 제로
- RR: Jero
- MR: Chero

Jeon Jun-yong (Korean: 전준용; born September 25, 1991), better known by his stage name Jero (Korean: 제로), is a South Korean singer.

== Career ==
Before entering the music scene, Jun-yong attended Anyang Arts High School as a student in the acting department. He made his debut in 2010, known as Junyong in the boy group Touch under YYJ Entertainment, but left in April 2012 to complete his two-year mandatory military service. On July 9, 2014, Jun-yong was announced as a member of YMC Entertainment's new co-ed hip hop group Lucky J, along with Jessi and J'Kyun, under the stage name J-Yo. He left the group in August 2016, to focus on his solo career with the new stage name, Jero. Jero signed to Echo Global Group, where he debuted as a soloist on August 11, 2016, with the single "Airplane". On March 23, 2017 he came out with two more singles, "Delusional" and "Birthday Blu" with their own respected music videos as well. He then came out with his fifth single, "Traffic Light" on June 21, 2017. In 2018 he releases his sixth single, "Flower Bomb." He also released his seventh single, "Save Me" featuring Park Jimin (15&).

== Discography ==
=== Singles ===
Title	Year	Peak chart positions	Album
Title	Year	KOR	Album
As lead artist
"Airplane" (비행기) feat. Giriboy	2016	—	Non-album singles
"Delusional" (취해도 돼)	2017	—	Non-album singles
"Birthday Blu"	2017	—	Non-album singles
"Traffic Light" (신호등) feat. Beenzino	2017	—	Non-album singles
"Flower Bomb"	2018	—	Non-album singles
"Save Me" feat. 15& Park Ji-min	2018	—	Non-album singles
"Elizabeth"	2019	—	Non-album singles
"Judge"	2019	—	Non-album singles
"G DAY"	2019	—	Non-album singles
Collaborations
"Paradise" with Dok2	2016	—	Non-album single
As featured artist
"Garosu-gil" (가로수길) Eru feat. J-Yo	2015	—	Non-album singles
"Body Lotion" (바디 로션) J'Kyun feat. JYO	2016	—	Non-album singles
"All Yours" (바디 로션) J'Kyun feat. JERO	2019	—	Non-album singles
"—" denotes releases that did not chart.
