= Boys Republic (band) =

2013–2018 South Korean boyband

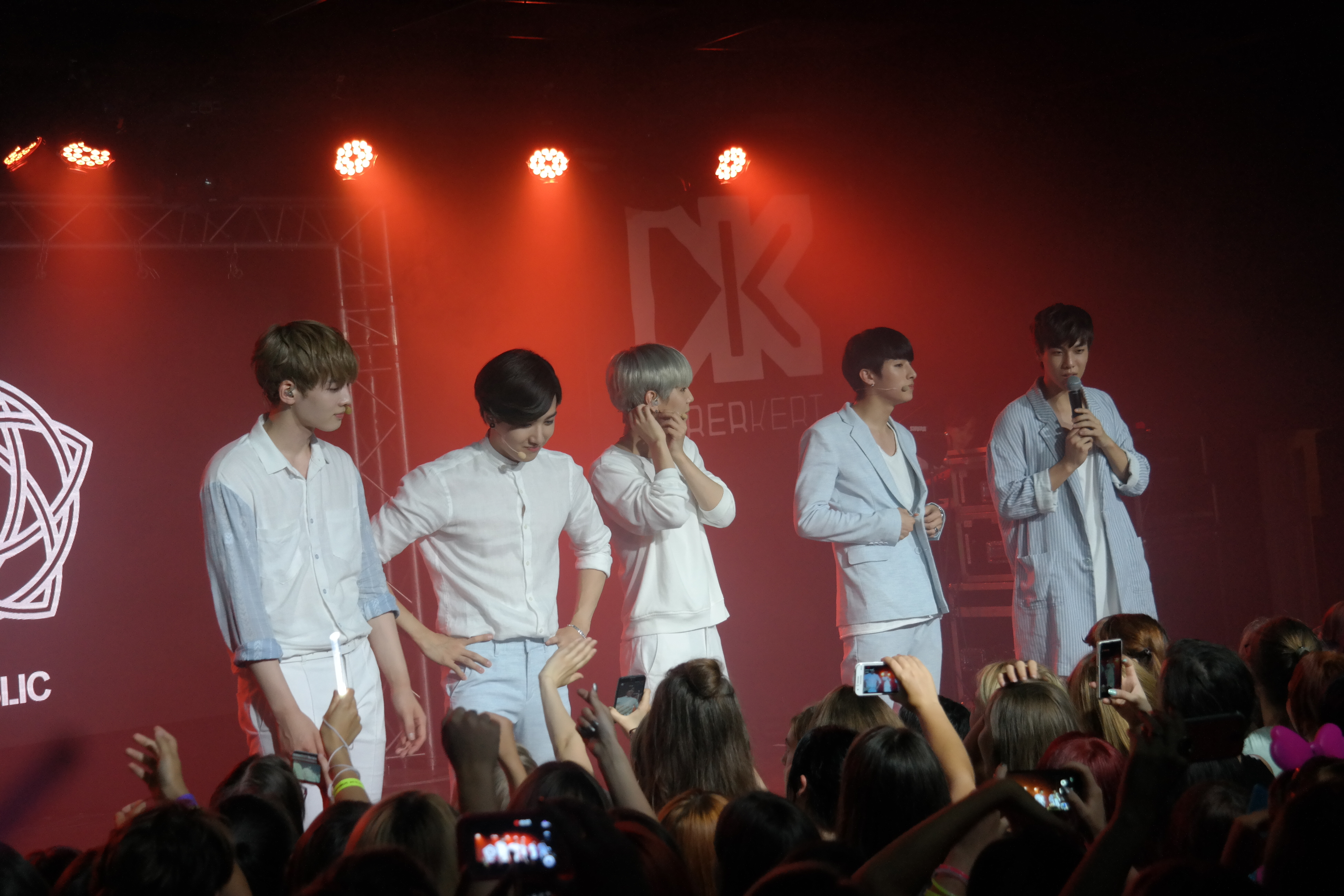
- Boys Republic in Budapest

Background information
- Origin: Seoul, South Korea
- Genres: K-pop
- Years active: 2013–2018
- Labels: Universal Music; Happy Tribe Entertainment
- Members: Onejunn; Sunwoo; Sungjun; Minsu; Suwoong

Korean name
- Hangul: 소년공화국
- Hanja: 少年共和國
- RR: Sonyeon gonghwaguk
- MR: Sonyŏn konghwaguk

Boys Republic (Korean: 소년공화국) is a South Korean boy band consisting of five members: Onejunn, Sunwoo, Sungjun, Minsu, and Suwoong. They are Universal Music's first K-pop idol group (also managed by Happy Tribe Entertainment). Boys Republic debuted on June 5, 2013, with the single "Party Rock". On September 12, 2018, they announced that they would go on indefinite hiatus.

== History ==
=== Pre-debut ===
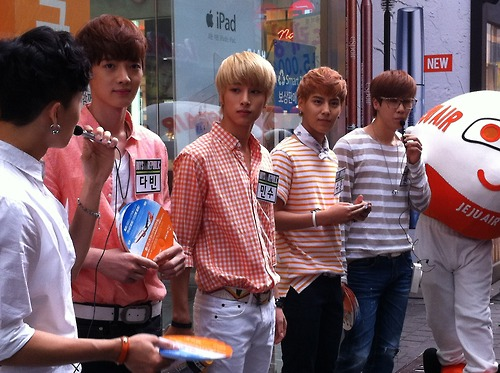
Boys Republic promoting for Jeju Air in front of Frisbee, an Apple retail store in Myeongdong, Seoul on June 21st of 2013.

Before their debut in mid-2013, Boys Republic, as a band, they have received two years of training under Universal Music and Jung Hae IK of Happy Tribe Entertainment, who has helped to produce first generation idols such as g.o.d, H.O.T, and S.E.S. The boys have been trained in singing, dancing, acting, and languages and cultures of other countries. To further establish global relevance, the group's chief music adviser, producer and composer Keun Tae Park has collaborated with Dsign Music, the Norwegian songwriting/production company that has written songs for TVXQ, Girls' Generation, and EXO.

Prior to the two years training from Universal Music, some of the members have received training under other recording labels and talent agencies. Sunwoo (vocal), formerly known as Dabin, was a former member of the South Korean boy band, Touch, managed by YYJ Entertainment and had also received training under Cube Entertainment. On the 10th July 2014, on his personal Twitter (SNS), he revealed that he has changed his name from Choi Dabin(최다빈) to Choi Sun Woo(최선우). Sungjun (rap and dance) was a former JYP Entertainment trainee and Suwoong (vocal) was previously under Big Hit Entertainment.

In March 2013, three months before their official debut, Boys Republic was chosen as the PR for Jeju Air 2013, the group's first endorsement with their Jeju Air brand song, "Orange Sky."

=== 2013: Debut single "Party Rock" and mini-album Identify ===
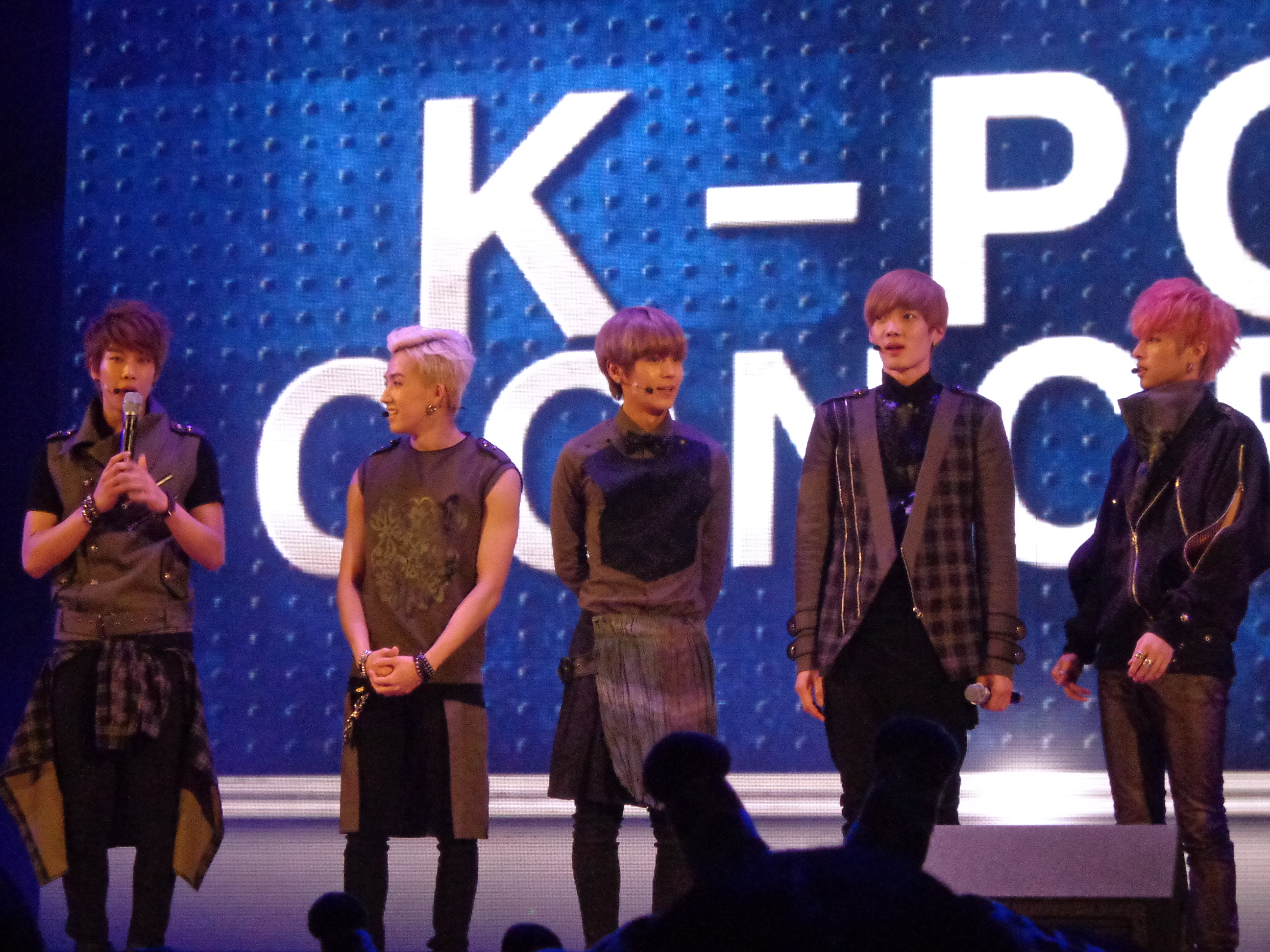
Boys Republic at Lotte World K-POP Concert on November 30th of 2013.

Boys Republic made their debut with the first single, "Party Rock." After its release, the song peaked at No. 1 on iTunes single charts in Indonesia, Philippines, Singapore, and Thailand. On June 2, the group performed on their very first stage in front of a crowd of nearly 20,000 local K-POP fans in Japan at the K-POP Festival 2013 Live in Kumamoto. In the months of June and July, SBS MTV aired the group's eight episode reality show "Rookie King: Boys Republic." They took on their second endorsement and became the new face of Michiko London Koshino 2013.

After their successful debut, the group made a comeback with their 1st EP, "IDENTITY" on October 8 with written lyric contributions from their group leader, Onejunn. They held their first domestic showcase for the comeback at Ilchi Art Hall, Seoul. Their EP title song "You Are Special" peaked at No. 1 on KKBOX Chart in Malaysia in 2013. They were voted by fans to close the U.O.X. 2013 held by Celcom in Malaysia. Boys Republic officially debuted in Malaysia the following week with their "I'm Ready" Showcase in Kuala Lumpur. In November, Boys Republic along with South Korean boy group, VIXX, became ambassadors for "Eye Camp Expedition", a charity campaign, joining other volunteers in Vietnam to help those visually impaired. Their charity work was documented through a four episodes reality show aired on SBS MTV. They were named 2014 ambassadors for Korean Federation of Youth to promote youth development activities conducted by schools and youth training institutions.

=== 2014: Fantasy trilogy and MTV World Stage in Malaysia ===
On February 5, 2014, Boys Republic announced their comeback through their official social media accounts, revealing the first teaser image for "Fantasy Trilogy" with the slogan, "making the dreams and fantasies of fans come true". With this three title song comeback, they plan to show a 180 degrees transformation for the new year. The second teaser illustration further conveys the concept with each of the group member posing as their favorite superheroes: Onejunn as Spiderman, Sunwoo as Wolverine, Sungjun as Ironman, Minsu as Batman, and Suwoong as Super Mario. On February 16, they revealed the first song of the trilogy titled "Video Game" with the caption, "Childish boys growing up to be superheroes." "Video Game" is produced by Keun Tae Park, written by Jin Choi and Danish songwriter Mage, and composes of Hybrid-Electronic Trap (H.E.T.) sounds, intense electronic bass, and gaming sound effects. It was officially released on February 20 along with the dance version of the music video with choreography from the Nana School team. For their 300th day since debut celebration, Boys Republic released the story version music video, visually portraying the group members passing through game levels in virtual space as game characters to win the hearts of the ones they love.

Five months after the unveiling of their "Fantasy Trilogy", Boys Republic announced their second comeback of 2014 on July 14. Their two-part title song for "Fantasy Trilogy" part two is a collaboration with the producing team, Duble Sidekick. On July 17, 2014, they released the first teaser video of their summer track titled, 예쁘게 입고 나와(Dress up), which literally translates to "Dress Prettily and Come Out." The teaser features the five members of Boys Republic and Gag Concert's comedian, Lee Suji. Boys Republic released the electronic pop "Dress Up" and its music video on July 25. The song is about how the boys have eyes only for their girlfriends. They cannot live without the love of their special someone.

On August 16, representing South Korea, Boys Republic shared the stage with B.o.B, Yuna, and Thaitanium in front of an audience of approximately 15,000 for the 6th MTV World Stage Live in Malaysia. Their performance included the tracks: "I'm Ready", "You Are Special", a remix version of "Video Game", their debut song, "Party Rock", and a special song composed by Onejunn titled "몽유" (Somnambulance). Boys Republic also performed their most recent song, "Dress Up", inviting the winner of BR's Girlfriend contest to join them on stage as their girlfriend. During their stay in Malaysia for the MTV World Stage Concert, they had an interview session with approximately 60 well-known media outlets from Malaysia, Thailand, Indonesia, and Singapore. They also held a fan-signing of a thousand and played laser tag with their fans to show their love and appreciation.

During the months of September and October, their schedule comprised more than a dozen live stage performances and guest concerts including South Korea's Hallyu Dream Concert and K Festival in Incheon. Boys Republic's third and final installment of 2014 "Fantasy Trilogy" was revealed to be their second mini-album titled, "Real Talk", with title song "The Real One." The official album cover of "Real Talk" and its track list was made public early November, followed by the first photo teasers of Boys Republic in modern dress attire along with the exact date of EP release, November 12 of 2014. At 11:11 pm of November 11, Boys Republic Official YouTube Channel published the music video for "The Real One", disclosing their latest concept of "Modern vs. Classic", the fashionable man transcending time and space. Classical attire based on the Victorian Era conveyed elegance while the clean style of modern suits conveyed sophistication. The title song is written and composed by Duble Sidekick with rap lyric contribution from Boys Republic's Minsu. Boys Republic garnered many peer/celebrity supporters shown by the hashtag, 진짜가 나타났다 (The Real One). Such supporters included the Ghana-born broadcaster, Sam, and South Korean boy group, VIXX. "Real Talk" track list contains their 2014 singles, "Video Game" and "Dress Up", along with their first ballad song, "Like a Doll", and Onejunn's self written and composed "Somnambulance."

On November 27, in Japan, at Tower Records Shibuya, Boys Republic held their first Japanese showcase in front of a crowd of 1,000 fans. Their stage included "The Real One", I'm Ready", "You Are Special", "Video Game", "Like a Doll" and "Party Rock." Boys Republic flew back to South Korea the next day to accept the Teen Artist Award at the 22nd Korean Cultural Entertainment Awards.

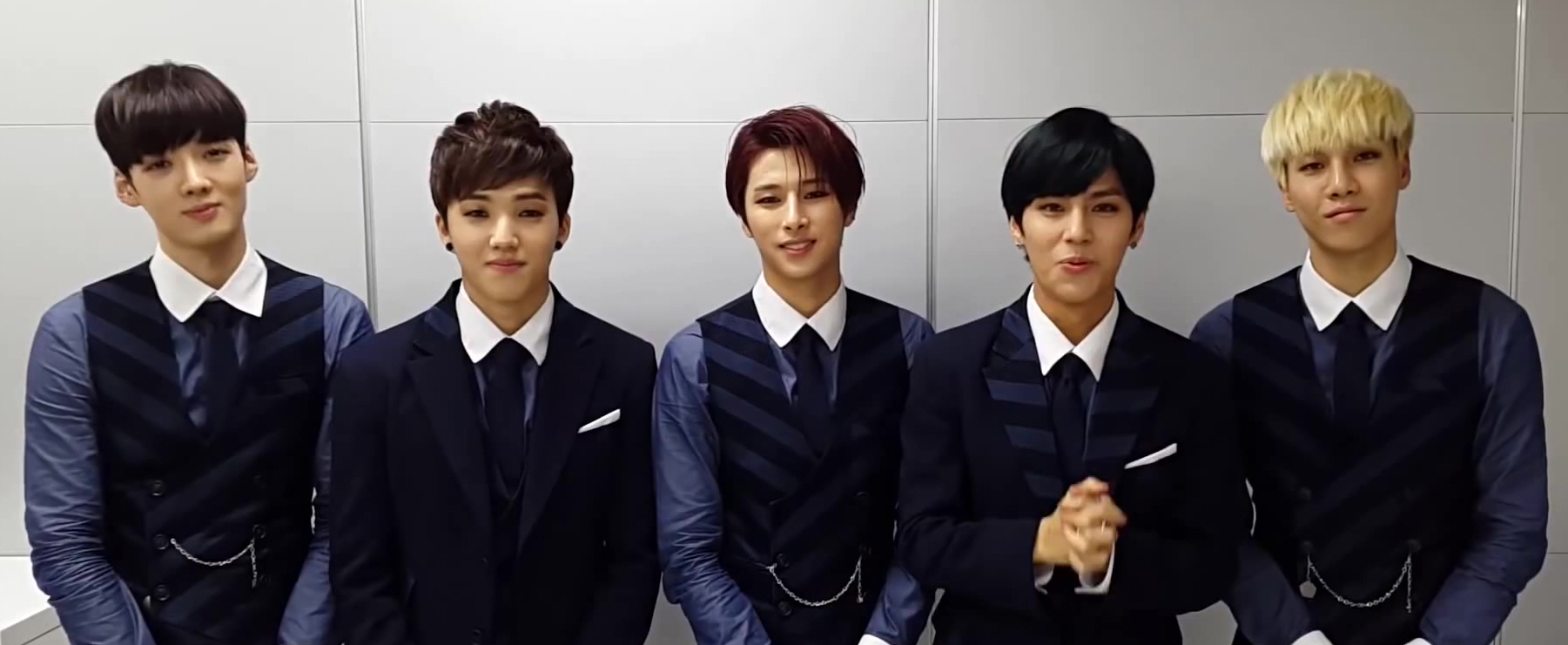
SAC broadcasting message from Boys Republic.

In the last month of 2014, Boys Republic took the opportunity, during the height of their comeback, to participate in charity work. Vocalist, Sunwoo, posted an image of himself knitting hats for newborns, encouraging others to join him in "Save the Children" project, a campaign that delivers hats to Uganda, Ethiopia, and Pakistan. December 20, Boys Republic volunteered their service in Gwanghwamun, Seoul, wearing red Salvation Army charity activewear and offering free hugs in the cold weather. Proceeds from the charity event went towards improving poverty stricken neighborhoods.

=== 2015: Comeback with "Hello" and the Royal Tour in Europe ===
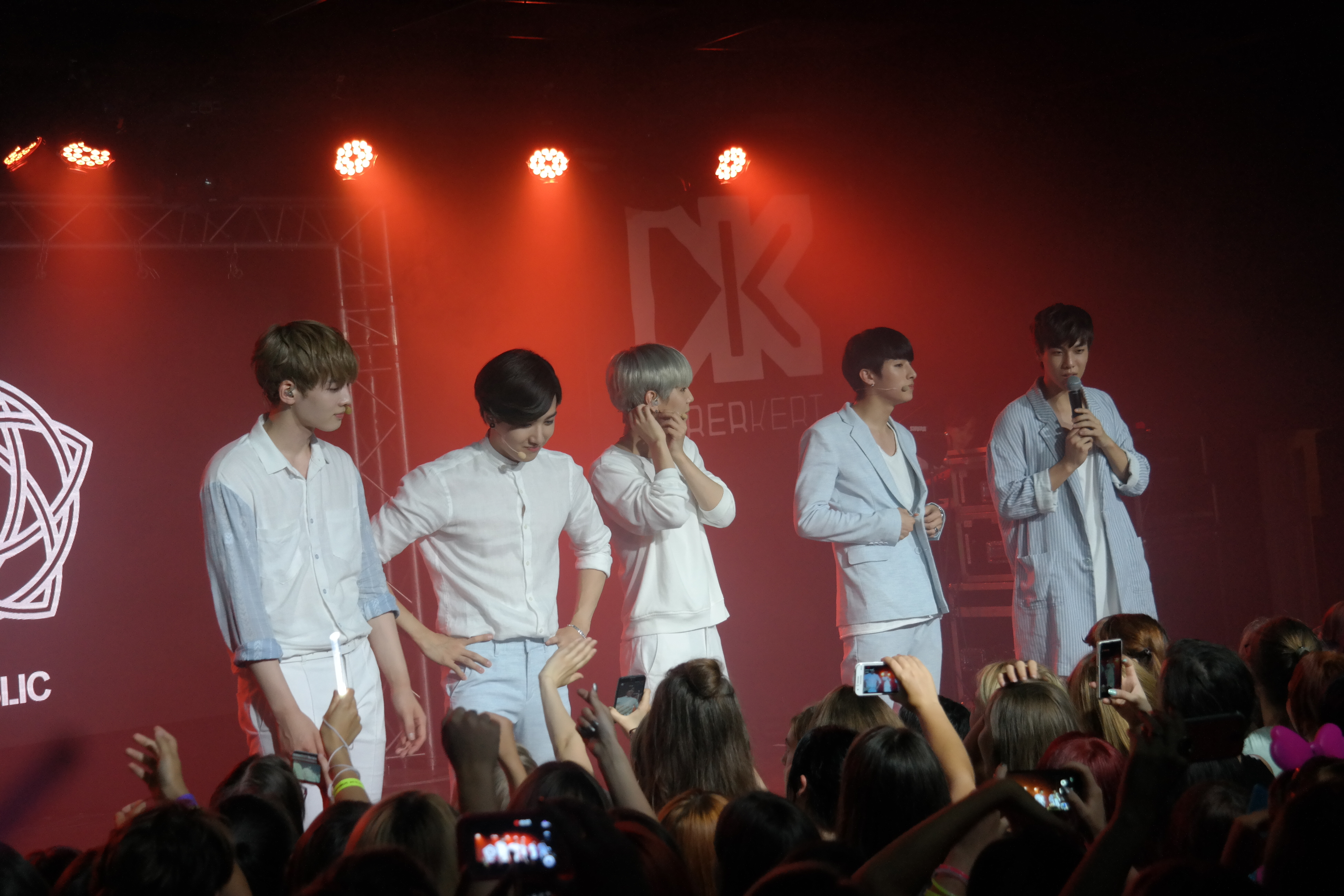
Boys Republic in Budapest, 11 July 2015

Boys Republic began the year with a series of performances at Megaworld Lifestyle Malls in the Philippines. Prior to the performances, an official press conference was held in Marco Polo Ortigas on January 9. On January 10, they met with their fans at Lucky China Town in Manila and Venice Piazza in McKinley Hill, Taguig. On January 11, Boys Republic made an appearance on ABS-CBN's Sunday afternoon show, ASAP, before holding their 'meet-and-greet' event in addition to their last performance in Eastwood, Quezon City. During their introduction, Boys Republic surprised their fans by sing and dancing to Vice Ganda's "Boom Panes." Boys Republic spent their Valentine's Day in Japan, performing in the "Sweet Valentine's Live" event. On March 28, they returned to Japan and performed in Yokohama on Pops in Seoul concert stage along with U-Kiss and HOTSHOT in celebration of the 50th anniversary of Korea-Japan diplomatic ties.

For April Fool's Day, Boys Republic changed their name to Girls Republic on official channels: YouTube, Daum Fan Cafe, and other social medias. Each member came up with their own female stage name and profile.

In the beginning of May, Boys Republic officially announced the dates and locations of their concerts in eight different cities across Europe, a part of their "European Royal Tour 2015." Starting on May 27, they released daily image teasers for their June comeback including the cover and track list of their 4th single album, "Hello." During the 2015 Dream Concert held at the Seoul World Cup Stadium on May 23, Boys Republic revealed a snippet of their new, unreleased song, "Hello." On June 3, the music video for "Hello" was released. On June 5, the day of their 2 years anniversary since debut, "Hello" was officially released along with the album which includes the acoustic and instrumental versions of "Hello." The song expresses the looks of a man missing an ex-lover with restrained emotions.

=== 2016: Third mini-album BR: Evolution, Japan Tour and Japan first single album: Only Girl ===
On March 29, Boys Republic released music video of song "Get Down", title track of their third mini-album BR: Evolution. The song is portrayed with powerful energy through music which is based on powerful bass drum and electronic sounds leading by 808 synth. BR: Evolution also included other three new songs: "Eyes on Me", "V.I.P", Onejunn's first solo song, "A Song for You", along "Get Down" and its instrumental. The album was described as "perfect transformation of Boys Republic where the members have expressed their own resistance and rebellion, trying overcome their difficulties".

The music video of "Get Down" was rated as 19+ due to provocative scenes with sexy models and blood splatting battle scene. Some scene in the music video is a homage from movie Mad Max. On April 5, Boys Republic released a clean version of "Get Down" music video without the provocative and blood splatting battle scene. Boys Republic promoted "Get Down" for two months on various music shows in Korea.

On May 14, Boys Republic kicked start their Japan promotion with solo event, Royal Memorial Ceremony Vol. 0 held at Yamano Hall, Tokyo, Japan. The event received a lot of support until it has to be divided into two part events to fulfill fans' request. Their 2015 single "Hello" was remade into Japanese version and released on May 13 on iTunes Japan and various Japan music sites. On June 8 was released BR: Evolution (Japan edition) and a compilation album Shōnen Kyōwakoku 2013-2015 Best, consisting of their popular tracks from 2013 to 2015, including both version of "Hello". Boys Republic kick start their Japan promotion with Boys Republic Japan Tour 2016 in July. On September 28, they released a Japan single album 'Only Girl'. A special movie with the same title, starred by the boys themselves was released on a same day with one day premiere in Japan in commemoration of the Japanese debut.

=== 2017–2018: Japanese singles, The Unit and indefinite hiatus ===
On January 5, 2017, Boys Republic continued their Japan promotions by the release of single track 'Closer'.

That August, it was announced that all members of the group would be participating in the KBS idol rebooting show The Unit.

On September 12, 2018, Boys Republic and their agency agreed that they would be ceasing their activities indefinitely after their final live on September 30.

== Members ==
- Onejunn (원준)
- Sunwoo (선우)
- Sungjun (성준)
- Minsu (민수)
- Suwoong (수웅)

== Discography ==
=== Studio albums ===
Title	Album details	Peak chart positions	Sales
Title	Album details	JPN	Sales
Japanese
Beginning	Released: August 30, 2017; Label: Universal Music, Happy Tribe Entertainment; Format: CD, CD+DVD, digital download; Track listing: 1. We're Boys Republic; 2. Closer - Kiss Made Dorekurai? (キスまでどれくらい？); 3. Stand Up!; 4. Sleep ～ Chotto Time! Baby (Sleep ～ チョットTime! Baby); 5. One-Sided Love; 6. Good days, Bad days 7. Nagareru Hoshi Ni Hanataba Wo (流れる星に花束を); 8. Happy Face; 9. Daisuki Da Yo (大好きだよ); 10. So Fantasic; 11. Kimi Ga Soba Ni Ite (君がそばにいて); 12. Happiness; 13. Only Girl; 14. Hello Sunshine; 15. Beautiful; 16. Bonus Track : Royal pātī ~ kyōwakoku no tēma (Royal Party ～ 共和国のテーマ(Japanese Version))	65	JPN: 863

=== Extended plays ===
Title	Album details	Peak chart positions	Sales
Title	Album details	KOR	Sales
Identity	Released: October 8, 2013; Label: Universal Music, Happy Tribe Entertainment; Format: CD, digital download; Track list: 1. I'm Ready; 2. You Are Special (넌 내게 특별해); 3. What For (뭐하러); 4. L.I.U; 5. Party Rock (전화해 집에); 6. Special Girl; 7. Orange Sky	9	KOR: 3,719+
Real Talk	Released: November 12, 2014; Label: Universal Music, Happy Tribe Entertainment; Format: CD, digital download; Track list: 1. The Real One (진짜가 나타났다); 2. Like a Doll (인형); 3. Pump; 4. Round (가운데); 5. Somnambulance (몽유); 6. Dress Up (예쁘게 입고 나와); 7. Video Game	10	KOR: 2,011+
BR: Evolution	Released: March 30, 2016; Label: Universal Music, Happy Tribe Entertainment; Format: CD, digital download; Track list: 1. Get Down; 2. Eyes On Me (지켜만 봐); 3. V.I.P; 4. A Song For You (널 위했던 노래)	14	KOR: 1,672+

=== Single albums ===
Title	Album details	Peak chart positions		Sales
Title	Album details	KOR	JPN	Sales
Korean
Dress Up	Released: July 25, 2014; Label: Universal Music, Happy Tribe Entertainment; Format: CD, digital download; Track list: 1. Dress Up; 2. Dress Up inst.	11	—N/a	KOR: 1,415+
Hello	Released: June 5, 2015; Label: Universal Music, Happy Tribe Entertainment; Format: CD, digital download; Track list: 1. Hello; 2. Hello acoustic version 3. Hello inst.	10	—N/a	KOR: 1,544+
Japanese
Only Girl	Released: September 28, 2016; Label: Universal Music, Happy Tribe Entertainment; Format: CD, digital download; Track list: 1. Only Girl; 2. Happy Face; 3. So Fantasic	—N/a	32	JPN: 2,164+
Hello Sunshine	Released: January 25, 2017; Label: Universal Music, Happy Tribe Entertainment; Format: CD, digital download; Track list: 1. Hello Sunshine; 2. Stand Up!	—N/a	55	
Daisuki Da Yo	Released: January 25, 2017; Label: Universal Music, Happy Tribe Entertainment; Format: CD, digital download; Track list: 1. Daisuki Da Yo (大好きだよ); 2. Kimi Ga Soba Ni Ite (君がそばにいて)	—N/a	58	
Closer - Kiss Made Dorekurai?	Released: January 25, 2017; Label: Universal Music, Happy Tribe Entertainment; Format: CD, digital download; Track list: 1. Closer - Kiss Made Dorekurai? (キスまでどれくらい？); 2. One-Sided Love	—N/a	35	JPN: 1,875+
Nagareru Hoshi Ni Hanataba Wo	Released: May 24, 2017; Label: Universal Music, Happy Tribe Entertainment; Format: CD, digital download; Track list: 1. Nagareru Hoshi Ni Hanataba Wo (流れる星に花束を); 2. Beautiful	—N/a	30	JPN: 2,499+

=== Compilation albums ===
Title	Album details	Peak chart positions
Title	Album details	JPN
Shōnen Kyōwakoku 2013-2015 Best	Released: June 8, 2016; Label: Universal Music, Happy Tribe Entertainment; Format: CD, CD+DVD, digital download; Track list CD: 1. The Real One (진짜가 나타났다); 2. Party Rock (전화해 집에); 3. Pump; 4. You Are Special (넌 내게 특별해); 5. Special Girl; 6. Like A Doll (인형); 7. Hello; 8. Dress Up (예쁘게 입고 나와); 9. L.I.U; 10. Video Game; 11. Hello Japanese version; DVD: 1. Party Rock (전화해 집에) music video 2. Party Rock (전화해 집에) dance music video 3. You Are Special (넌 내게 특별해) music video 4. L.I.U music video 5. Orange Sky music video 6. Video Game story music video 7. Party Rock (전화해 집에) dance music video 8. Dress Up (예쁘게 입고 나와) music video 9. The Real One (진짜가 나타났다) music video 10. Hello music video 11. Story of Boys Republic	221

=== Singles ===
Title	Year	Peak chart positions		Sales	Album
Title	Year	KOR	JPN	Sales	Album
Korean
"Party Rock" (전화해 집에)	2013	120	—N/a	KOR: 22,115+	Identity
"You Are Special" (넌 내게 특별해)	2013	167	—N/a	—N/a	Identity
"Video Game"	2014	246	—N/a	—N/a	Real Talk
"Dress Up" (예쁘게 입고 나와)	2014	164	—N/a	—N/a	Real Talk
"The Real One" (진짜가 나타났다)	2014	282	—N/a	—N/a	Real Talk
"Hello"	2015	213	—N/a	—N/a	Hello
"Get Down"	2016	—	—N/a	—N/a	BR: Evolution
"Ending Credit"	2018	—	—	—	Non-album singles
Japanese
"Only Girl"	2016	—N/a	32	—N/a	Only Girl
"Hello Sunshine"	2017	—N/a	55	—N/a	Hello Sunshine
"Daisuki Da Yo" (大好きだよ)	2017	—N/a	58	—N/a	Daisuki Da Yo
"Closer" (キスまでどれくらい?)	2017	—N/a	35	—N/a	Closer - Kiss Made Dorekurai?
"Nagareru Hoshi Ni Hanataba Wo" (流れる星に花束を)	2017	—N/a	30	—N/a	Nagareru Hoshi Ni Hanataba Wo
"—" denotes releases that did not chart or were not released in that region.

=== Soundtrack appearances ===
Year	Title	Drama
2015	Candle Love (촛불)	A Daughter Just Like You

== Filmography ==
=== Reality shows ===
Year	Network	Title	Note(s)
2013	SBS MTV	Rookie King: Boys Republic	8 Episodes.
2013	SBS MTV	Eye Camp Expedition	4 Episodes.
2017	KBS	The Unit: Idol Rebooting Project	None

== Awards ==
Year	Award	Category
2014	Asian Model Festival Award	New Star Award
2014	Annual Korean Entertainment Arts Award	Newcomer Award
2014	Korean Cultural Entertainment Award	Teen Artist Award
