= Simon (song) =

1980 song by Joan Armatrading

Single by Joan Armatrading

from the album Me Myself I
- B-side: "He Wants Her"
- Released: October 1980
- Length: 3:40
- Label: A&M
- Songwriter: Joan Armatrading
- Producer: Richard Gottehrer

Joan Armatrading singles chronology
"All the Way from America" (1980)	"Simon" (1980)	"I'm Lucky" (1981)

"Simon" is a song by English singer-songwriter Joan Armatrading, released in October 1980 by A&M Records as the third and final single from her sixth studio album, Me Myself I (1980). The song was written by Armatrading and produced by Richard Gottehrer.

== Release ==
Unlike the two preceding single's from Me Myself I, "Simon" failed to make an appearance in the UK singles chart. It did, however, reach number 70 on Record Business magazine's UK Airplay Guide 100 chart in early November 1980. It achieved only "occasional play" on BBC Radio 1, but was more successful across Independent Local Radio, where it reached the A and B lists of numerous stations, and was also B-listed on Radio Luxembourg.

== Critical reception ==
Upon its release, Mark Ellen of Smash Hits summarised, "Armatrading's current work is much less emotional, which is a shame in many ways, as 'Simon' – a wafer thin drama about confidence gained and love lost – would blow away altogether were it not anchored by an anxious sax break." Robin Smith of Record Mirror called it "one of her least accessible tracks" as "you really have to work to like it and it isn't going to pick up casual listeners". He added that he was also "getting a little fed up with yet another plunder from the Me Myself I album".

Mike Pryce of the Worcester Evening News felt "Simon" was better suited as a "good album track" and criticised its release as a single for being what "seems almost a desperate shot". He added, "Not her best by any means and won't further her singles career." Paul Walker of the Sandwell Evening Mail also questioned its release as a single, remarking that it is "less likely to make the charts than the previous more commercial effort". He continued, "Not that it is not a classy song, most of her work is. It's slower and technically excellent, it just won't sell."

== Track listing ==
7–inch single (UK and the Netherlands)

1. "Simon" – 3:40
2. "He Wants Her" – 3:15

== Personnel ==
Production

- Richard Gottehrer – production ("Simon")
- Thom Panunzio – engineering ("Simon")
- Gregg Caruso – engineering assistance ("Simon")
- Greg Calbi – mastering ("Simon")
- Joan Armatrading – production ("He Wants Her")
- Henry Lewy – production ("He Wants Her")

Other

- George DuBose – photography

== Charts ==
Chart (1980)	Peak position
UK Airplay Guide 100 (Record Business)	70
