= Walk Under Ladders =

Studio album by Joan Armatrading
- Released: 4 September 1981
- Recorded: July 1981
- Studio: The Town House (London)
- Genre: New wave; soft rock
- Length: 35:16
- Label: A&M
- Producer: Steve Lillywhite

Joan Armatrading chronology
Me Myself I (1980)	Walk Under Ladders (1981)	The Key (1983)

Singles from Walk Under Ladders
- 1. "I'm Lucky" Released: August 1981; 2. "When I Get It Right" Released: October 1981; 3. "No Love" Released: January 1982; 4. "I Wanna Hold You" Released: February 1982

Professional ratings
Review scores
Source	Rating
AllMusic	3/5 stars
Christgau's Record Guide	B−
The Encyclopedia of Popular Music	3/5 stars

Walk Under Ladders is the seventh studio album by the British singer-songwriter Joan Armatrading, released on 4 September 1981 by A&M Records. The album peaked at No. 6 on the UK Albums Chart and was certified Gold by the British Phonographic Industry for sales in excess of 100,000 copies. The album peaked at No. 16 in Australia. Two minor hits from the album both fell just short of cracking the UK Top 40: "I'm Lucky", which peaked at No. 46, and "No Love", which peaked at No. 50.

== Background ==
The album was produced by Steve Lillywhite. Five tracks from the album were released as singles; "I'm Lucky", "When I Get It Right", "No Love", "I Wanna Hold You" and "The Weakness in Me". Thomas Dolby plays most of the synthesizer parts on the album and Andy Partridge of XTC provides guitar on two tracks from the album.

The album was reissued by Cherry Pop in 2010 featuring three bonus tracks.

== Track listing ==
All tracks composed by Joan Armatrading.

Side one

1. "I'm Lucky" – 3:05
2. "When I Get It Right" – 3:03
3. "Romancers" – 3:48
4. "I Wanna Hold You" – 3:46
5. "The Weakness in Me" – 3:33

Side two

6. "No Love" – 3:58
7. "At the Hop" – 3:26
8. "I Can't Lie to Myself" – 3:23
9. "Eating the Bear" – 2:59
10. "Only One" – 4:15

Bonus tracks on the 2010 reissue

11. "Shine" – 3:48
12. "Dollars" – 3:28
13. "Crying" – 3:23

== Personnel ==
Credits are adapted from the Walk Under Ladders liner notes.

- Joan Armatrading – lead vocals, acoustic guitar (on "I Wanna Hold You", "At the Hop" and "I Can't Lie to Myself"), electric piano (on "Only One")
- Hugh Burns – guitar (except on "When I Get It Right", "I Can't Lie to Myself" and "Eating the Bear")
- Andy Partridge – guitar on "The Weakness in Me" and "Eating the Bear"
- Kirby – guitar on "When I Get It Right" and "I Wanna Hold You"
- Gary Sanford – guitar (on "When I Get It Right", "Romancers", "At the Hop" and "I Can't Lie to Myself"), backing vocals (on "When I Get It Right" and "No Love")
- Tony Levin – bass guitar (except on "I Can't Lie to Myself"), stick on "Eating the Bear"
- Robbie Shakespeare – bass guitar on "I Can't Lie to Myself"
- Nick Plytas – organ, piano on "The Weakness in Me", synthesizer on "No Love"
- Thomas Dolby – synthesizers (except on "No Love")
- Mel Collins – saxophone on "When I Get It Right" and "No Love"
- Dick Cuthell – horn on "Romancers"
- Rico Rodriguez – horn on "Romancers"
- Ray Cooper – percussion
- Julian Diggle – percussion on "At the Hop"
- Jerry Marotta – drums (except on "I Can't Lie to Myself"), vocals on "No Love"
- Sly Dunbar – drums on "I Can't Lie to Myself"
- Steve Lillywhite – backing vocals on "When I Get It Right" and "No Love"
- Clark Peters – vocals on "Eating the Bear"

Production and artwork

- Steve Lillywhite – producer
- Steve Brown – engineer
- George Chambers – assistant engineer
- Michael Ross – art direction
- Michael Ross – cover design
- Simon Ryan – cover design
- Tony McGee – front cover; inner sleeve photography
- Graham Hughes – back cover; inner sleeve portrait

== Sales and certifications ==
Certifications for Walk Under Ladders
Region	Certification	Certified units/sales
Netherlands (NVPI)	Gold	50,000^{^}
^{^} Shipments figures based on certification alone.
