= Lucky J =

South Korean hip hop trio

- Origin: South Korea
- Genres: Hip hop
- Years active: 2014–2016
- Label: YMC Entertainment
- Past members: J'Kyun; Jessi; J-Yo

Lucky J (Korean: 럭키제이) was a South Korean hip hop trio formed by YMC Entertainment. The group consisted of J'Kyun, Jessi, and J-Yo. They debuted in July 2014 with the single "Can You Hear Me?".

== History ==
=== 2014: Debut ===
On July 9, 2014, YMC Entertainment announced the formation of a new co-ed hip hop group. The members were revealed to be rapper J'Kyun, rapper and vocalist Jessi, and vocalist J-Yo.

On July 17, 2014, the group released their debut single, "Can You Hear Me?", through digital music portals along with its accompanying music video. The same day, they made their official debut performance on M Countdown, performing their first single.

Following their debut, Lucky J appeared on the first episode of Mnet’s variety program Singer Game, as well as the music competition show Immortal Songs 2.

=== 2015: Hiatus and solo activities ===
After the release of their first single, the members of Lucky J focused on individual promotions and collaborations. In February 2015, J-Yo released the song "Avenue" with singer Eru. In July, J'Kyun released the single "Bad X," featuring Jooheon from Monsta X and Konsoul.

Jessi gained significant public attention after competing on the rap survival program Unpretty Rapstar, which aired from January to March 2015. Following the show, she appeared as a guest on several popular variety programs, including Running Man and Happy Together.

Jessi also collaborated with several well-known artists, including Park Jin-young and Primary. Her first solo rap single, "Ssenunni," was released in September 2015, and she later performed the song at the 2015 Mnet Asian Music Awards.

=== 2016: Second single, J-yo's departure & disbandment ===
In December 2015, it was revealed that the group was preparing an album, though no release date was announced. On January 8, 2016, the group released their second single, "No Love," along with its music video. The group officially made their comeback performance the same day on Mnet’s M Countdown.

In August 2016, J-Yo announced his departure from the group to pursue a solo career under the stage name Jero. Later that year, Jessi confirmed via social media that Lucky J had disbanded.

== Discography ==
=== Singles ===
Title	Year	Peak chart positions	Sales	Album
Title	Year	KOR	Sales	Album
"Can You Hear Me?" (들리니)	2014	—	—N/a	Non-album single
"Pitiful" (불쌍해)	2014	—	—N/a	Temptation OST
"No Love"	2016	—	KOR: 16,358+	Non-album single
"—" denotes releases that did not chart.
