= When I Get It Right =

1981 song by Joan Armatrading

Single by Joan Armatrading

from the album Walk Under Ladders
- B-side: "Crying"
- Released: October 1981
- Length: 3:02
- Label: A&M
- Songwriter: Joan Armatrading
- Producer: Steve Lillywhite

Joan Armatrading singles chronology
"I'm Lucky" (1981)	"When I Get It Right" (1981)	"The Weakness in Me" (1981)

"When I Get It Right" is a song by English singer-songwriter Joan Armatrading, released in October 1981 by A&M Records as the second single from her seventh studio album, Walk Under Ladders (1981). The song, which was written by Armatrading and produced by Steve Lillywhite, reached number 89 on the Record Business UK Top 100 Singles chart.

== Background ==
Armatrading has described "When I Get It Right" as being "about when you just can't seem to do anything right for anybody".

== Release ==
"When I Get It Right" received airplay on UK radio. It was added to BBC Radio 1's 'C' List and was a "hit pick" on Radio Luxembourg. It also received play across Independent Local Radio. It did not enter the UK singles chart, but did reach number 89 on the Record Business Top 100 Singles chart in November 1981.

== Music video ==
The song's accompanying music video was directed by Godley & Creme and was shot in London. The appearance of the schoolchildren in parts of the video was not pre-planned. They were walking home from school when they saw the shoot in progress and were invited to participate. In an interview with PopMatters in 2021, Armatrading recalled, "I loved making that video. That was a lot of fun. The kids were coming home as we were making the video and they just jumped in! For me, the kids made the video actually."

== Critical reception ==
Upon its release, Jim Whiteford of The Kilmarnock Standard considered "When I Get It Right" to be "different to her previous work", with an "odd rhythmic makeup which will either leave her doting fans ice cold or take her to the top ten". He added that "as ever her voice control and vocal power are both flawless". Paul Walker of the Sandwell Evening Mail praised the "excellent track" but questioned its commercial potential, noting, "I doubt whether it will be a single success; she just doesn't seem to transfer her album excellence to the throwaway pop market".

Mike Pryce of the Worcester Evening News was mixed in his review, writing, "Tough, brash, singe your eyebrows music with the help of a chorus on the chorus – if you see what I mean. Thumps along but a talent going to waste here." Elvis Costello, as guest reviewer for Melody Maker, was critical of the song, describing it as "Joan Armatrading under attack from a Steve Lillywhite production". He said, "It was fine for 'Respectable Street', but here it is hopelessly heavy-handed."

== Track listing ==
7–inch single (UK, the Netherlands and Australasia)

1. "When I Get It Right" – 3:02
2. "Crying" – 3:28

== Personnel ==
"When I Get It Right"

- Joan Armatrading – lead vocals
- Kirby – guitar
- Gary Sanford – guitar, backing vocals
- Thomas Dolby – synthesizer
- Nick Plytas – organ
- Mel Collins – horns
- Tony Levin – bass
- Jerry Marotta – drums
- Drew Barfield – backing vocals
- Steve Lillywhite – backing vocals

Production

- Steve Lillywhite – production

== Charts ==
Chart (1981)	Peak position
UK Top 100 Singles (Record Business)	89
