= No Love (Lucky J song) =

Song by Lucky J

Single by Lucky J
- Released: January 8, 2016
- Recorded: 2015
- Genre: Hip-Hop
- Length: 3:38
- Label: YMC Entertainment
- Songwriters: Famousbro; J'Kyun
- Producers: Famousbro; Paul

Lucky J singles chronology
"Can You Hear Me?" (2014)	"No Love" (2016)

"No Love" is a song recorded by South Korean hip-hop group Lucky J. YMC Entertainment released it as a digital single in South Korea on January 8, 2016, and internationally on January 22. The song was written by group member J'Kyun and composer Famousbro, who also produced the song alongside Paul.

== Background and development ==
"No Love" was written by Lee Kyun (J'Kyun) and Famousbro. Famousbro and Paul handled production. It was announced on December 7, 2015, that the group was working on a new song, with no exact release date. On January 4, 2016, it was released a teaser for the music video, being officially released on January 7.

== Promotion ==
The group started promotions on Mnet's M! Countdown on January 7, 2016. They continued on KBS's Music Bank on January 8, MBC's Show! Music Core on January 9 and SBS's Inkigayo on January 10, among others for January.

== Chart performance ==
The song failed to enter the Gaon Digital Chart, which combines sales of digital downloads and streaming in South Korea, but managed to enter the Gaon Download Chart at number 87, with 16,538 downloads sold, for the week ending January 9, 2016. This marked the group's first entry to any Gaon charts.

== Charts ==
=== Weekly ===
Chart (2016)	Peak position
South Korea (Gaon Download Chart)	87
