= The Weakness in Me =

1981 single by Joan Armatrading

- 7-inch Netherlands vinyl single

Single by Joan Armatrading

from the album Walk Under Ladders
- B-side: "Crying"
- Released: November 1981
- Length: 3:33
- Label: A&M
- Songwriter: Joan Armatrading
- Producer: Steve Lillywhite

Joan Armatrading singles chronology
"When I Get It Right" (1981)	"The Weakness in Me" (1981)	"No Love" (1982)

"The Weakness in Me" is a song by English singer-songwriter Joan Armatrading, released as the third single from her seventh album, Walk Under Ladders (1981). It was released as a single in the US and Netherlands only in November 1981. Despite not charting, the song has become one of Armatrading's best known songs.

== Background ==
Armatrading has described "The Weakness in Me" as being "about somebody who has an affair and they've fallen for the person that they're having the affair with, but they love the person they were with whilst they were having the affair". The song was not inspired by Armatrading's own personal life. She told The Boston Globe in 1982, "[It's] not about me cause I'm not married and I'm not having a three-way affair or something like that."

== B-sides ==
The single featured as its B-side the original songs "Dollars" and "Crying", which remained unreleased on an album until the reissue of her 1981 album Walk Under Ladders in 2010.

== Music video ==
The song's accompanying music video was directed by Godley & Creme.

== Critical reception ==
Upon its release as a single in the US, Cash Box wrote, "In her distinctively deep and resounding voice, Armatrading creates a plaintive and poignant musical message in her own inimitable way. Producer Lillywhite surrounds the simple woodblock-piano accompaniment with a gripping bass-synthesizer sound." Record World praised it as "one of Joan's strongest lyrical efforts", which "deals with temptation and what it means to have a fickle heart". They concluded, "Joan's pointed lyrics and stirring vocal colors are bonuses for any format."

== Track listings ==
7": A&M / 2381-S (US)

1. "The Weakness in Me" – 3:32
2. "Crying" – 3:28

7": A&M / AMS 9190 (Netherlands)

1. "The Weakness in Me" – 3:32
2. "Dollars" – 3:29

12": A&M / AMS 12.9191 (Netherlands)

1. "The Weakness in Me" – 3:32
2. "Dollars" – 3:29
3. "Crying" – 3:28
4. "Shine" – 3:49

== Personnel ==
- Joan Armatrading – vocals, guitar
- Hugh Burns – guitar
- Ray Cooper – percussion
- Thomas Dolby – synthesiser
- Tony Levin – bass
- Jerry Marotta – drums
- Andy Partridge – guitar
- Nick Plytas – organ, piano

== Cover versions ==
- In 1986, actress and singer Karla DeVito covered the song for her second album Wake 'Em Up in Tokyo.
- In 1992, punk rock band Thelonius Monster covered the song for their fourth album Beautiful Mess.
- In 1993, folk singers Frances Black and Kieran Goss covered the song for their album Frances Black & Kieran Goss.
- In 1995, Melissa Etheridge covered the song for the compilation album Ain't Nuthin' but a She Thing. The song was then featured on her 2002 DVD concert album Live... And Alone. In 2003, Etheridge was nominated with the song for the Grammy Award for Best Female Rock Vocal Performance at the 45th Annual Grammy Awards.
- In 2000, actress Kassie DePaiva covered the song for her debut album Naked.
- In 2000, Bob Rowe covered the song for his tribute album Tom Thumb's Blues – A Tribute to Judy Collins.
- In 2003, folk singer John Wright covered the song for his sixth album That's The Way Love Is.
- In 2005, British singer Keisha White released an R&B version of the song on her debut album Seventeen. It had been intended to be the third single from the album but it was not released. The song was then released a year later as the first single from her second album Out of My Hands. The song was produced by Lucas Secon and peaked at number 17 on the UK Singles Chart.
