= Seventeen (Keisha White album) =

Studio album by Keisha White
- Released: 7 March 2005
- Recorded: 2003–2004; Atomic Dred Studios, London. Milco Studios, London; Copenhagen, Denmark; Metrophonic Studios; Whitfield Street Studios
- Genre: R&B; soul
- Length: 54:21
- Label: Warner Music, Korova
- Producer: Don-E, Lucas Secon, Pete Biker & Delgado (aka Soulpower), Mark Taylor, Jeff Taylor, Brian Harris, Mr Dexter, Maximum Risk

Keisha White chronology
Seventeen (2005)	Out of My Hands (2006)

Singles from Seventeen
- 1. "Don't Care Who Knows" Released: 21 February 2005; 2. "Don't Fool a Woman in Love" Released: 23 May 2005; 3. "The Weakness in Me" Released: 27 February 2006

Seventeen is the debut album by British R&B singer Keisha White. The album features three singles: "Don't Care Who Knows" featuring the rapper, Cassidy, "Don't Fool A Woman In Love", and her critically acclaimed cover of Joan Armatrading's "The Weakness In Me", which is Keisha's biggest hit single to date, peaking inside the UK top 20. Eight songs were produced and co-written by Lucas Secon including both singles. All the key tracks appeared on her 2nd album.

== Track listing ==
No.	Title	Producer(s)	Length
1.	"Seventeen"
2.	"Don't Care Who Knows" (featuring Cassidy)	Lucas Secon
3.	"Open Like So"	Lucas Secon
4.	"Don't Fool a Woman in Love"
5.	"Brother"	Lucas Secon
6.	"Spent Money"
7.	"The Weakness in Me"	Lucas Secon
8.	"No Wallflower"	Lucas Secon
9.	"Why"
10.	"What's On Your Mind"	Lucas Secon
11.	"Complicated Emotions"	Lucas Secon
12.	"What Makes You Think"
13.	"One Step At a Time"
14.	"I've Got Love" (featuring Bob Marley)
15.	"Don't Care Who Knows" (Original Version)	Lucas Secon
