= Touch (South Korean group) =

South Korean boy band

Touch (터치)
- Also known as: The Original Undeniable Charismatic Homme
- Origin: Seoul, South Korea
- Genres: K-pop; Dance-pop
- Years active: 2010–2016
- Labels: YYJ Entertainment
- Past members: Hanjun; Younghun; Minseok; Junyoung; Dabin; Kanghyun; Chulmin; Sungyong; Jaewook; Sunwoong; Sangwook

Touch (Korean: 터치; shortened from The Original Undeniable Charismatic Homme) was a South Korean boy band formed by YYJ Entertainment in Seoul, South Korea. The final lineup consisted of five members: Chulmin, Sungyong, Jaewook, Sunwoong and Sangwook. They debuted on October 22, 2010, with the single "Me". Their fans were called "Touchables".

== Members ==
=== Final lineup ===
- Chulmin (철민)
- Sungyong (성용)
- Jaewook (재욱)
- Sunwoong (선웅)
- Sangwook (상욱)

=== Former ===
- Hanjun (한준)
- Younghun (영훈)
- Minseok (민석)
- Junyoung (준용)
- Dabin (다빈)
- Kanghyun (강현)

== Discography ==
=== Extended plays ===
Title	Album details	Peak chart positions	Sales
Title	Album details	KOR	Sales
Touch	Released: October 22, 2010; Label: YYJ Entertainment, LOEN Entertainment; Formats: CD, digital download; Track listing: 1. Me (난); 2. Touch; 3. Killin' Me	26	—N/a
Too Hot To Handle	Released: May 5, 2011; Label: YYJ Entertainment, CJ E&M; Formats: CD, digital download; Track listing: 1. Too Hot 2 Handle; 2. Luv; 3. Rockin' The Club; 4. Today	12	KOR: 1,618+

=== Singles ===
Title	Year	Peak chart positions		Album
Title	Year	KOR	JPN	Album
Korean
"Me" (난)	2010	—	—N/a	Touch
"Rockin' The Club"	2011	—	—N/a	Too Hot To Handle
Walk With Me (같이 걷자)	2012	—	—N/a	Non-album singles
"Me" (난) new ver.	2014	—	—N/a	Non-album singles
Japanese
"Start To Fly"	2013	—N/a	—	Non-album singles
"Kimi Ni ～Maybe I Fall In Love～ (キミに)	2014	—N/a	—	Non-album singles
"—" denotes releases that did not chart.
