= No Love (Joan Armatrading song) =

Single by Joan Armatrading

from the album Walk Under Ladders
- B-side: "Dollars"
- Released: January 1982
- Recorded: 1981
- Genre: Pop/Rock
- Label: A&M
- Songwriter: Joan Armatrading
- Producer: Steve Lillywhite

Joan Armatrading singles chronology
"The Weakness in Me" (1981)	"No Love" (1982)	"Drop the Pilot" (1983)

"No Love" is a song by the English singer-songwriter Joan Armatrading, released in January 1982 by A&M Records as the third single from her seventh studio album, Walk Under Ladders (1981). The song, written by Armatrading and produced by Steve Lillywhite, reached number 50 in the UK singles chart.

== Critical reception ==
Upon its release, Ian Birch of Smash Hits described "No Love" as being "up to Joan's usual impeccable standards", with "bags of emotion and a wonderfully unpolished feel". Julie Birchill of the NME was negative in her review, saying that it "sounds like Claire Rayner trying single-handedly to start a James Taylor revival". She continued, "I don't go for Joan's brand of introspection – I think she's just a placebo for all the Leonard Cohen fans who wanted to feel up to date – and if I hear one more song about Joan in pain/in trouble/in love I think I will mutilate the vinyl bringer of bad news."

== Personnel ==
- Joan Armatrading – lead vocal
- Hugh Burns – guitar
- Mel Collins – saxophone
- Ray Cooper – tambourine
- Tony Levin – bass
- Steve Lillywhite – production, backing vocal
- Jerry Marotta – drums, harmony vocal
- Nick Plytas – organ, synthesizer
- Gary Sanford – backing vocal

== Charts ==
Chart (1982)	Peak position
UK Singles (OCC)	50
