= Out of My Hands (Keisha White album) =

Studio album by Keisha White
- Released: 3 July 2006
- Recorded: 2004–2006; Snake Ranch Studios, London; Milco Studios, London; Whitfield Street Studios; MasEurope Studios, London
- Genre: R&B; soul
- Length: 47:02
- Label: Warner Music, Korova
- Producer: Robin Millar, Lucas Secon, Don E, Peter Biker, Delgado, Brian Harris

Keisha White chronology
| Seventeen (2005) | Out of My Hands (2006) |

Singles from Out of My Hands
- 1. "The Weakness in Me" Released: 27 February 2006; 2. "Don't Mistake Me" Released: 19 June 2006; 3. "I Choose Life" Released: 18 September 2006

Out Of My Hands is the second album by British R&B singer Keisha White released on 3 July 2006 by Warner Bros. Records. The album is made up of song from Keisha's debut album Seventeen, including the leading single, "The Weakness in Me" and six brand new songs including "Don't Mistake Me" and "I Choose Life". The album peaked at #55 in the UK Albums Chart.

== Critical reception ==
Professional ratings
Review scores
| Source | Rating |
|---|---|
| Music OMH | 4/5 stars |

Music OMH gave the album 4 star (out of a possible 5) noting that "Where Keisha will really win over her listeners is in the sultry down tempo tracks." Going on to say, "Fortunately the quality of songwriting is mostly good, with not much filler around."

== Track listing ==
| No. | Title | Producer(s) | Length |
|---|---|---|---|
| 1. | "Don't Mistake Me" | | 4:31 |
| 2. | "The Weakness In Me" | Lucas Secon | 3:20 |
| 3. | "What's On Your Mind" | Lucas Secon | 3:10 |
| 4. | "I Choose Life" | | 3:47 |
| 5. | "Complicated Emotions" | Lucas Secon | 4:19 |
| 6. | "Out of My Hands" | | 4:04 |
| 7. | "Love Is the Deepest Hurt" | | 3:46 |
| 8. | "Baby Come to Me" | | 3:31 |
| 9. | "Brother" | Lucas Secon | 4:13 |
| 10. | "Why" | | 4:01 |
| 11. | "One Step At a Time" | | 3:50 |
| 12. | "It Takes a Stronger Man" | | 4:29 |
