= I'm Lucky =

Single by Joan Armatrading

from the album Walk Under Ladders
- B-side: "Shine"
- Released: August 1981
- Studio: The Town House (London)
- Genre: Progressive pop; new wave
- Length: 3:05
- Label: A&M
- Songwriter: Joan Armatrading
- Producer: Steve Lillywhite

Joan Armatrading singles chronology
"Simon" (1980)	"I'm Lucky" (1981)	"When I Get It Right" (1981)

"I'm Lucky" is a song written and recorded by the Kittitian-English singer-songwriter Joan Armatrading, released as a single from her seventh studio album, Walk Under Ladders (1981). The single peaked at No. 46 on the UK singles chart, with its highest placing being No. 42 on the Dutch Single Top 100.

The song is notable for its heavy use of synthesizer played by Thomas Dolby, which lends the song an ethereal, dreamlike progressive pop quality.

== B-side ==
The single featured as its B-side the original song "Shine", which remained unreleased on an album until the reissue of Walk Under Ladders.

== Critical reception ==
Upon its release, Tony Jasper of Music & Video Week wrote, "Synthesized backing, another song from lady with unpredictable musical steps and short sharp lyric lines. Is distinctive. Might catch on." Sunie of Record Mirror considered the single to be "pleasant enough", but felt it was "hardly the stuff of which hits are made". Tim de Lisle, writing for Smash Hits, praised the song itself for being "just the kind that made Joan popular – mellow, medium-paced soul, beautifully sung", but was critical of the production. He noted that Joan is "backed not with gentle guitars but with the strident synthesisers and snare drums that producer Steve Lillywhite used to such good effect with Peter Gabriel – here the combination doesn't work".

== Charts ==
Chart	Position
Australia (Kent Music Report)	77
Netherlands (Single Top 100)	42
UK Singles (OCC)	46
UK Airplay Guide (Record Business)	24
