= Keisha White =

English R&B singer

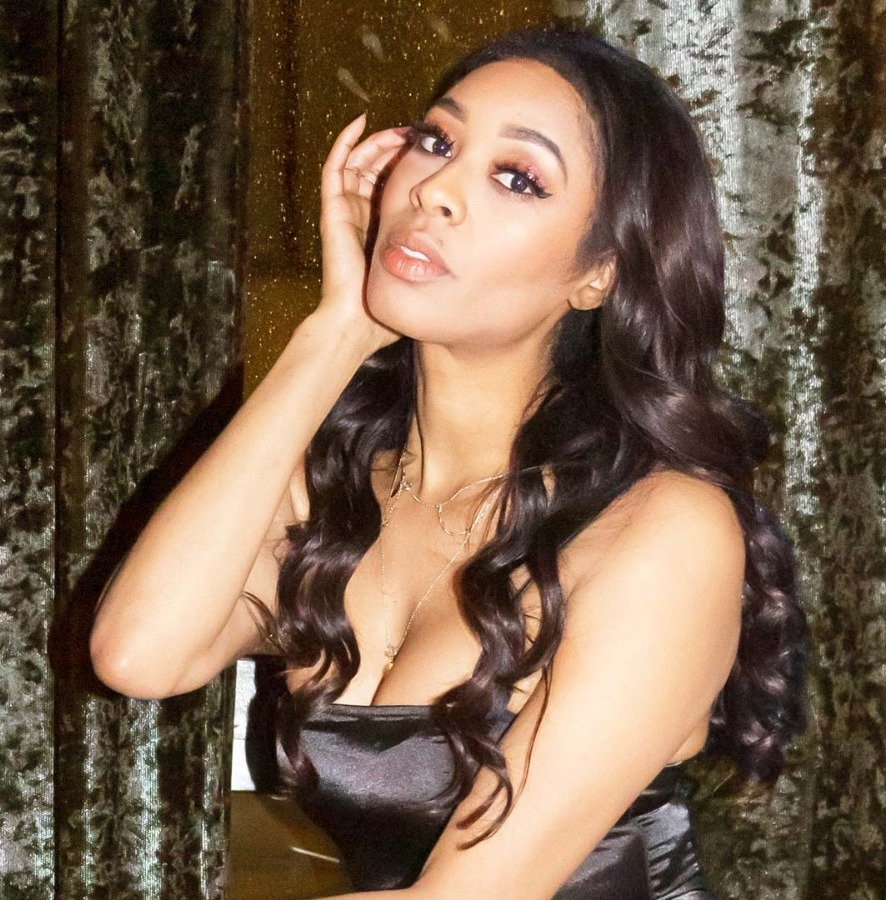

Background information
- Born: 1988 (ages 37-38); London, England
- Genres: R&B; pop; soul
- Occupation: Singer-songwriter
- Years active: 2002–present
- Label: Warner Bros.
- Website: keishawhite.co.uk

Keisha White (born 1988) is an English R&B singer. She has released two albums: Seventeen in 2005 and Out of My Hands in 2006. She is best known however for her song "Someday", which served as the theme to the CBBC television series The Story of Tracy Beaker (2002–2005) and My Mum Tracy Beaker (2021).

== Life and career ==
White was born in London, England. She attended Enfield County School for girls, then pursued a career in music whilst attending Susi Earnshaw Theatre School in Barnet, North London, alongside Jay Asforis who found fame in S Club 8. When she was 14, White was invited to perform in front of music executives at Warner Bros. Records. She sang an a cappella version of You'll Lose a Good Thing by Aretha Franklin and the record company were so impressed that they signed her. This became the first song White performed live for an audience. At the age of 15 she collaborated with Paul Oakenfold and Desert Eagle Discs.

White has toured countries in Africa, Europe, and the United States. White was involved with production, vocals and mastering working with Keith Harris, Theron Feemster, Phantom Boyz, Robin Miller. On 15 March 2004, at the age of 17, and three years after signing her record deal, White released her debut single, "Watcha Gonna Do", following a support slot on the R&B group Mis-Teeq's tour in late 2003. She also sang the theme tune for CBBC's The Story of Tracy Beaker television series and the track, titled "Someday", was included as the B-side to her debut single. She had a cameo appearance in the television movie Tracy Beaker: The Movie of Me that broadcast in February 2004.

=== 2005–06: Seventeen ===
After the release of "Watcha Gonna Do", White returned in 2005 with her second single, "Don't Care Who Knows". The track featured U.S. rapper Cassidy and peaked No. 29 in the UK Singles Chart. Following the release of this single, on 7 March 2005, White's debut album, Seventeen, was released. Her third single, "Don't Fool a Woman in Love" was released on 23 May 2005. After the limited success of both her album and third single, White went on another hiatus, following a support slot for Beverley Knight at Rochester Castle. A third single from her debut album, "The Weakness in Me", a double A-side with "Open Like So" was not released.

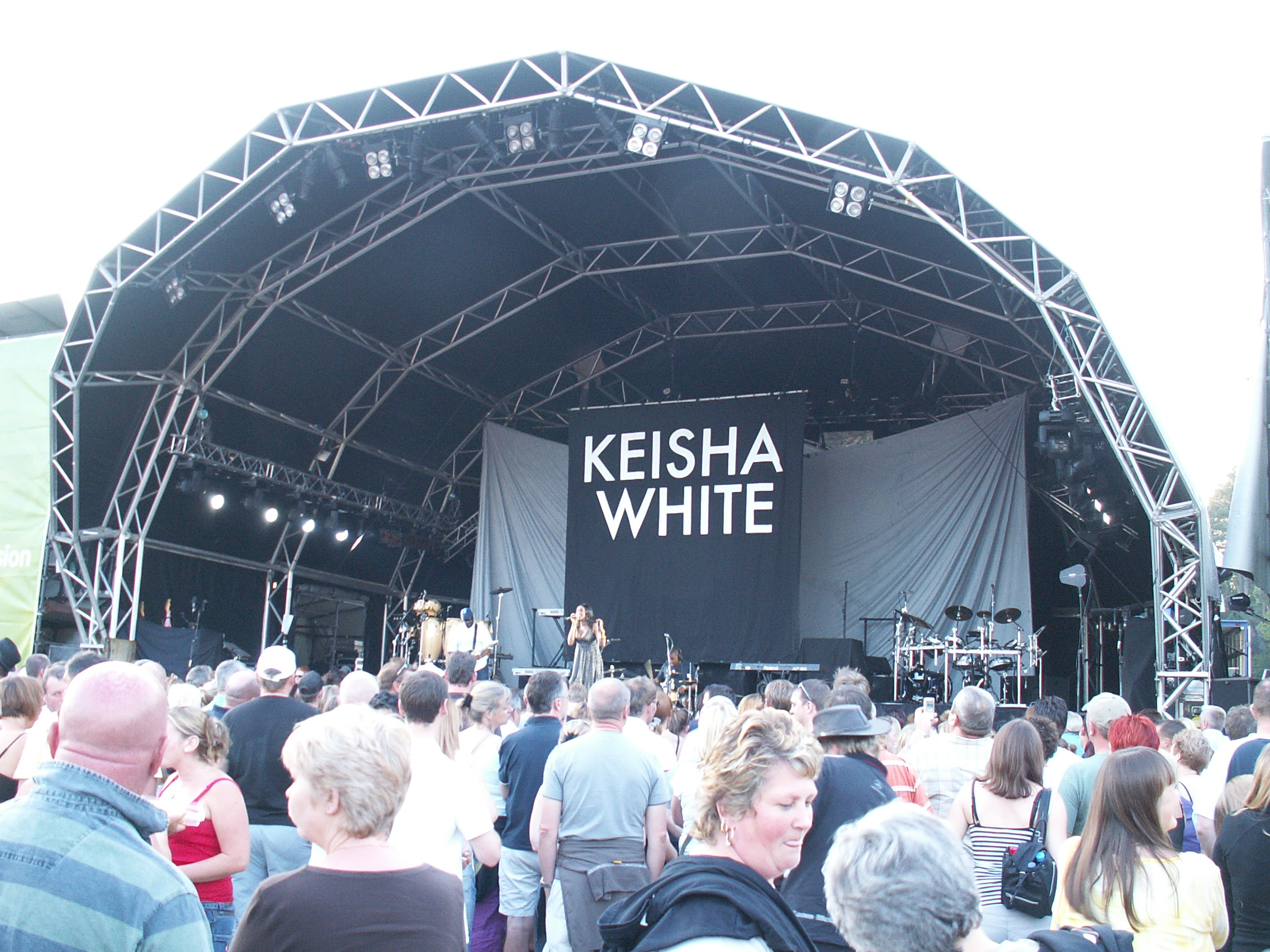
Keisha White supporting UB40 at Westonbirt Arboretum in 2006

White then returned in 2006 with a single, the choice was apparently influenced by her friend Alicia Keys. The single was a remake of Joan Armatrading's "The Weakness in Me", the originally intended third single from her debut album. The single was released on 27 February 2006, gaining strong support from UK music channels and BBC Radio 2, enabling it to become White's biggest hit to date, peaking at no. 17 in the UK Singles Chart. Because a re-packaged and re-titled version of the album Seventeen was due in 2006, her record label decided to delete the first album, making it a rarity.

=== 2006–07: Out of My Hands ===
On 19 June 2006, White released the second single from her second album, entitled "Don't Mistake Me", written by Absolute and Tracy Ackerman. The song peaked at No. 16 in the UK airplay chart, but reached only No. 48 in the UK Singles Chart. In 2006, the song featured in episode 5 of season 3 called "Oh, the Guilt!" of Grey's Anatomy. White's second album, Out of My Hands was released on 3 July 2006, and was half made up of tracks from Seventeen and the other half newly recorded songs. The album also included the third single from Seventeen, "The Weakness in Me". The album peaked at No. 55 in the UK Albums Chart.

The third single from the album, "I Choose Life", was a version of the Celine Dion song, "Ain't Gonna Look the Other Way". This was released on 18 September 2006, reaching No. 63 in the UK chart.

White worked with ByteNight, a charity event to raise money for the NCH to help stop youth homelessness. She, along with other celebrities, designed a pillow-case which was on auction on the ByteNight website. White was nominated for best UK female at the 2006 MOBO Awards, but lost out to Corinne Bailey Rae.

=== 2008–present ===
As of 2007, "Out of My Hands" remains White's most recent studio album. She released a new track, "Wrong N Right" in 2010.

On 31 March 2012, White performed a new single, "Butterflies". The single included a remix by Matt "Jam" Lamont, who remixed the Mis-Teeq single "Why" and turned it into a top ten hit.

One of White's famous fans is grime artist Stormzy, who revealed in 2019 that her single "The Weakness in Me" is one of his all-time favourite songs. He sampled her song "Someday" on his track "Superheroes" and on BBC Radio 1 with Clara Amfo during promotion of his second studio album, Heavy is the Head. Stormzy said (on "Someday") "that is one of the most prominent pieces of black British music, in terms of R&B. That's Keisha White singing – wonderful – I love Keisha White!"

In 2020, a new updated version of "Someday" was recorded to coincide with the premiere of My Mum Tracy Beaker, in which the track is also used. On 26 March 2021, the new version of "Someday" was released. It was the first time the song had been released as a single in its own right after only previously being available as the b-side to White's debut single "Watcha Gonna Do". A remix by Oliver Nelson was released on 2 April 2021.

== Discography ==
- Seventeen (2005)
- Out of My Hands (2006)

== Personal life ==
On Mother's Day 2021, White announced on Instagram that she had given birth to her first child on 12 March 2021.
