= J'Kyun =

South Korean rapper and singer

J'Kyun 김정태
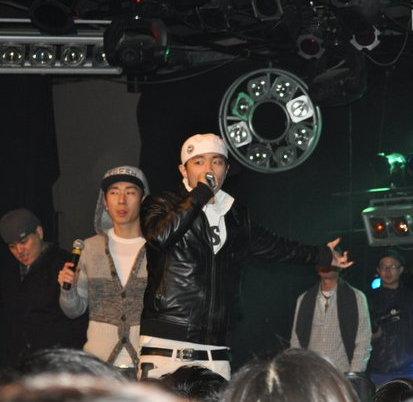
- J'Kyun in 2010

Background information
- Also known as: Jung Kyun; Rocy; Cox Billy
- Born: Kim Jung-tae; January 11, 1985 (age 41); South Korea
- Genre: Hip hop
- Occupations: Rapper; singer
- Instrument: Vocals
- Years active: 2005–present

- Korean name
- Hangul: 김정태
- RR: Gim Jeongtae
- MR: Kim Chŏngt'ae

Kim Jeong-tae (Korean: 김정태; born January 11, 1985), better known by the mononym J'Kyun (제이켠), is a South Korean rapper and singer.

== Career ==
Kim first entered the hip-hop scene in 2003, under the name Jung Kyun. After dropping out of Dongguk University he joined a hip-hop crew known as Diamond Tribe with members: JuNi, Freestarr, LEGO, and Marco and Lugar of Mo'Real, who performed frequently at Club Belly in Apgujeong-dong. He began work on his debut album in the Summer of 2003, with producers: Marco and Lee-ryung. The extended play, Just Clap, was finally released in November 2005.

In 2008, Kim officially changed his stage name to J'Kyun after his Diss track directed at San E went viral. His activities began to gain more attention when he joined the music group, Romantic City and produced lyrics under the name Rocy. He withdrew from the group in late 2010 just before the release of a new album. Shortly after this he became part of a group by the name Fresh Boyz, composed of members: Ceejay, Nolbu, Kwon Sa-jang and himself, although he left the group in mid 2011 for personal reasons.

In early 2010 J'Kyun announced that he had signed with BigDeal Records, where he went on to release his first studio album Re Birthday in May of the same year. Some songs on the album, namely "Mom" and "Back Then" were inspired by his mother, who had recently died. While the track "I Go" became known controversially, with negative lyrics surrounding big companies such as YG Entertainment, SM Entertainment and JYP Entertainment. In October J'Kyun announced that he had decided to leave Bigdeal Records, and that he was involved in a project with vocalist Kuan, currently preparing an underground EP. The project team began activities in November 2010 under the name Louis.B and released two digital singles.

In 2011, after J'Kyun had parted ways with Romantic City and Fresh Boyz, he joined Brand New Music where he began preparing a new album, but later left the label in 2012 and moved to Romantic Factory (a subordinate of Romantic City). Here he performed an internet radio show, "Ladies Radio", through his Facebook page, he used this platform to release songs that he had personally worked on, in particular, "Fantastic Soonkyu" and "Twinkle Soonkyu" which expressed affection towards Sunny of Girls' Generation.

In April 2012, J'Kyun released his second extended play These Days including the single "Hot MC" featuring Zico of Block B, the EP peaked at number 70 on the Gaon Chart. In May he was selected as the Korean representative of the global music jacket, "Music Matters" in Singapore.

In 2013, he participated in Mnet's Show Me the Money 2 as a contestant, starting as a "Meta Crew" member, but later joining the "D.O. Crew" before finally being eliminated in the later stages.

In 2014, J'Kyun joined YMC Entertainment where he, Jessi and J-Yo formed Lucky J. The group released two singles and featured in an official drama soundtrack before disbanding in August 2016.

In 2019, he participated again in Show Me the Money 8 as the masked rapper, Cox Billy. He was eliminated from the show during the 1:1 crew battle against Mckdaddy.

== Discography ==
=== Studio albums ===
Title	Album details	Peak chart positions	Sales
Title	Album details	KOR	Sales
Re Birthday	Released: May 11, 2010; Label: BigDeal Records, InPlanet Music; Format: CD, digital download	—	—N/a
"—" denotes releases that did not chart.

=== Extended plays ===
Title	Album details	Peak chart positions	Sales
Title	Album details	KOR	Sales
Just Clap	Released: November 1, 2005; Format: CD, digital download	—	—N/a
These Days	Released: April 13, 2012; Label: Romantic Factory, CJ E&M; Format: CD, digital download	70	—N/a
"—" denotes releases that did not chart.

=== Singles ===
Title	Year	Peak chart positions	Sales (DL)	Album
Title	Year	KOR	Sales (DL)	Album
"New Shit"	2005	—	—N/a	Just Clap
"Cool Chuck" (쿨한 척) feat. Marco & Outsider	2010	—	—N/a	Re Birthday
"These Days" (요즘그냥) feat. Soul King	2012	—	—N/a	These Days
"Rebekah" feat. Oh Su-min	2012	—	—N/a	These Days
"Let's Go to the Movies" (영화봐요우리) feat. Oh Su-min	2012	—	—N/a	Non-album single
"Heaven" feat. Oh Su-min	2013	98	KOR: 22,198	Show Me the Money 2
"Ponytail" (포니테일) feat. Ken of VIXX	2013	93	KOR: 21,644	Non-album singles
"Epilogue" (에필로그) feat. Rex.D	2013	—	—N/a	Non-album singles
"Blue Sweater" (블루 스웨터) feat. Park Ui-sung	2014	—	—N/a	The Voice of Korea
"Burnt Up" feat. King Kong	2014	—	—N/a	Non-album singles
"Cool Down" (식다)	2014	—	—N/a	Non-album singles
"Bad X" (나쁜 X) feat. Jooheon of Monsta X, Konsoul	2015	—	—N/a	Non-album singles
"Body Lotion" (바디 로션) feat. JYO	2016	—	—N/a	Non-album singles
"Soaking" (흠뻑) feat. Cherry Coke	2017	—	—N/a	Non-album singles
"Polaroid" (폴라로이드) feat. Tarin	2017	—	—N/a	Non-album singles
"Lit"	2017	—	—N/a	Non-album singles
"—" denotes releases that did not chart.

=== Collaborations ===
Year	Title	Other artist(s)
2011	"Local Player" (로컬 플레이어)	Bizniz feat. Joosuc
2016	"Not Just Friends" (남녀 사이에 친구가 어딨어)	Sugarbowl

== Filmography ==
=== Television ===
Year	Network	Title	Notes/Ref.
2013	Mnet	Show Me the Money 2	Contestant
2016	Mnet	Show Me the Money 5	Contestant
