= The Rolling Stones =

English rock band

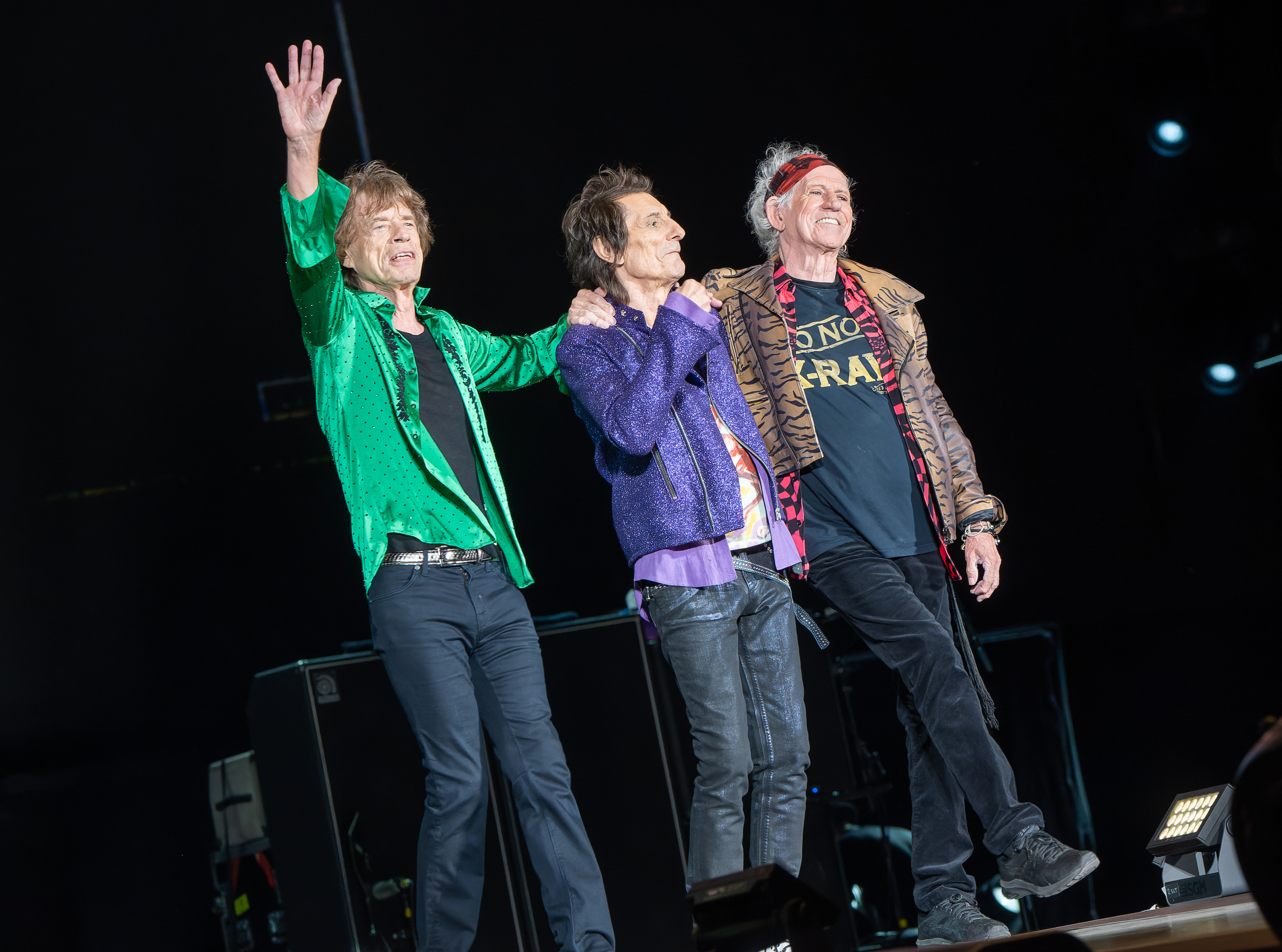
- The Rolling Stones on stage at BST Hyde Park in 2022. Left to right: Mick Jagger, Ronnie Wood, and Keith Richards.

Background information
- Origin: London, England
- Genres: Rock; pop; blues
- Works: Discography; songs; tours
- Years active: 1962–present
- Labels: Decca; London; ABKCO; Rolling Stones; Atlantic; A&M; Columbia; Virgin; Polydor; Interscope; Geffen; Capitol
- Spinoffs: Rocket 88; The New Barbarians
- Awards: Full list
- Members: Mick Jagger; Keith Richards; Ronnie Wood
- Past members: Brian Jones; Ian Stewart; Bill Wyman; Charlie Watts; Mick Taylor
- Website: rollingstones.com

The Rolling Stones are an English rock band formed in 1962. Dubbed "the Greatest Rock and Roll Band in the World", they are one of the most popular, influential, and enduring bands of the rock era. Rooted in blues, the Stones were at the forefront of the British Invasion and pioneered the gritty, rhythmically driven sound of hard rock. Their first stable line-up consisted of vocalist Mick Jagger, guitarist Keith Richards, multi-instrumentalist Brian Jones, bassist Bill Wyman, and drummer Charlie Watts, after keyboardist Ian Stewart was sidelined by manager Andrew Loog Oldham (though Stewart was retained as the band's road manager and session/touring keyboardist until his death in 1985). Jones was the leader in their early years, and named the band after a Muddy Waters song. Oldham encouraged them to write their own songs, and the Jagger–Richards partnership soon became the band's primary creative force.

They found success with their own compositions: "(I Can't Get No) Satisfaction", "Get Off of My Cloud" (both 1965) and "Paint It Black" (1966) became international No. 1 hits. Aftermath (1966) was their first album of entirely original material. In 1967, they had the double-sided hit "Ruby Tuesday"/"Let's Spend the Night Together" and experimented with psychedelia on Their Satanic Majesties Request. They returned to their roots (grafted with country) on the single "Jumpin' Jack Flash" and the album Beggars Banquet (1968), featuring "Sympathy for the Devil" and "Street Fighting Man".

Jones left the band a few weeks before his death in 1969, and was replaced by guitarist Mick Taylor. They scored another UK and US No. 1 single with "Honky Tonk Women", and released Let It Bleed, featuring "Gimmie Shelter" and "You Can't Always Get What You Want". In 1970, they formed Rolling Stones Records, for which their famous tongue and lips logo was created. Sticky Fingers (1971), their first album on the label, yielded "Brown Sugar" and "Wild Horses". It was followed by Exile on Main St. (1972), featuring "Tumbling Dice", and Goats Head Soup (1973), featuring "Angie". Taylor left the band at the end of 1974 and was replaced by Faces guitarist Ronnie Wood.

Continued success came with Some Girls (1978), featuring "Miss You", and Tattoo You (1981), featuring "Start Me Up". Steel Wheels (1989) and Voodoo Lounge (1994) were promoted by record-breaking world tours. Following Wyman's departure in 1993, the band continued as a four-piece core, with Darryl Jones becoming their regular bassist. By 2007, they had broken the record for the all-time highest-grossing concert tour three times, and were the highest-earning live act of 2021, with Steve Jordan becoming their regular drummer following Watts' death that year. Hackney Diamonds (2023) became their fourteenth UK No. 1 album, and Foreign Tongues (2026) was their fifteenth.

The Rolling Stones have won four Grammys and a Grammy Lifetime Achievement Award. They were inducted into the Rock and Roll Hall of Fame in 1989 and the UK Music Hall of Fame in 2004. They are ranked among the greatest artists of all time by Billboard and Rolling Stone.

== History ==
=== Formation ===
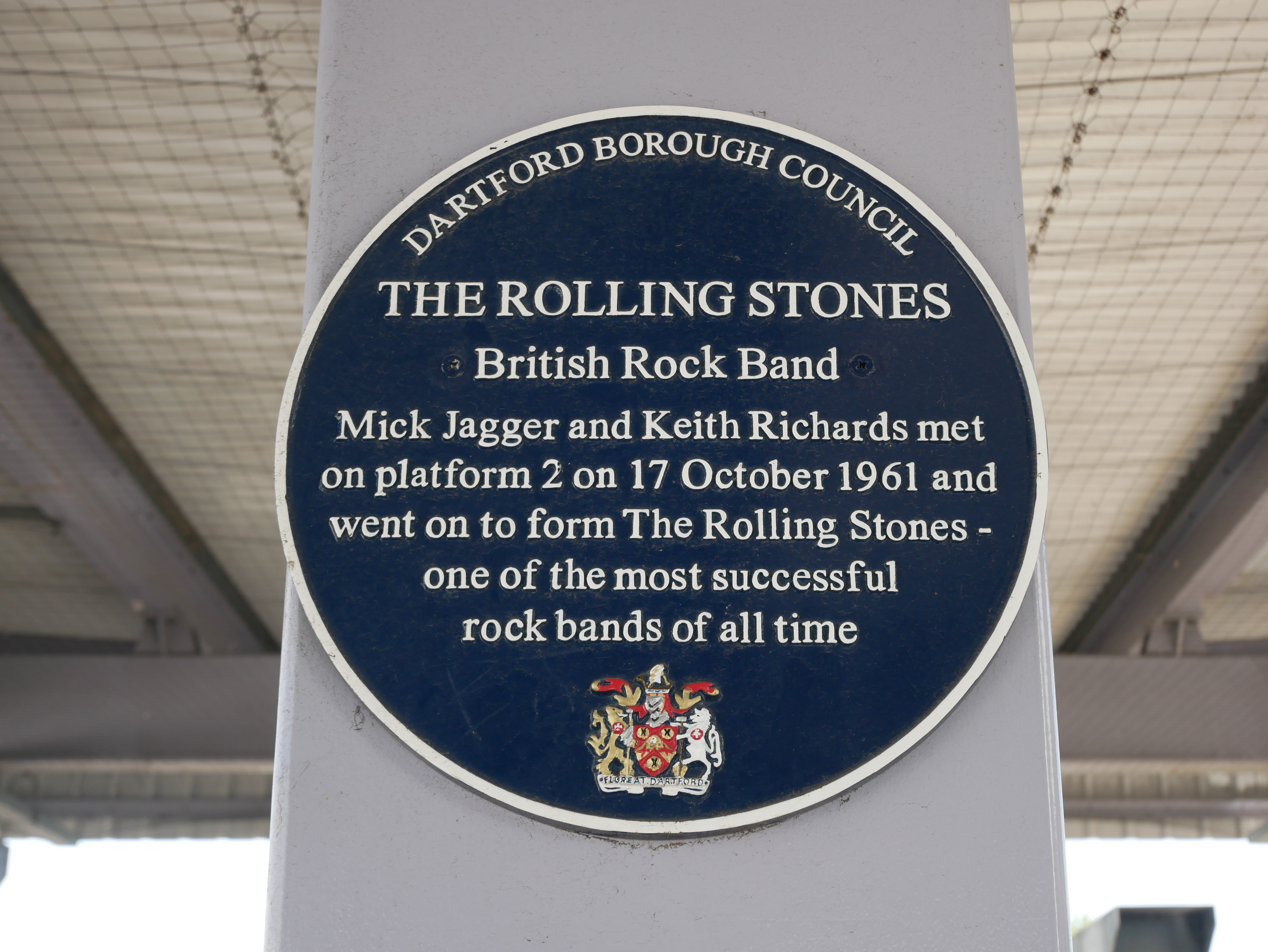
The blue plaque commemorating Jagger and Richards meeting on Platform 2 at Dartford railway station in Kent, on 17 October 1961

Mick Jagger and Keith Richards became childhood friends in 1950 in Dartford, Kent; the two lost contact in 1954 when the Jaggers moved. In the mid-1950s Jagger formed a garage band with his friend Dick Taylor, playing blues (Muddy Waters, Howlin' Wolf) and rock and roll (Chuck Berry, Little Richard, and Bo Diddley). Jagger, then a student at the London School of Economics, met Richards again on 17 October 1961 at Dartford railway station. Jagger was carrying records by Berry and Waters, revealing a shared interest to Richards. A musical partnership began shortly afterwards. Richards and Taylor often met at Jagger's house. The meetings moved to Taylor's house in late 1961, where Alan Etherington and Bob Beckwith joined the trio; the quintet called themselves the Blues Boys.

In March 1962, the Blues Boys read about the Ealing Jazz Club in Jazz News, which mentioned Alexis Korner's Blues Incorporated. The Blues Boys sent a tape of their best recordings to Korner, who was impressed. On 7 April, they visited the Ealing Jazz Club, where they met the members of Blues Incorporated, including slide guitarist Brian Jones, keyboardist Ian Stewart, and drummer Charlie Watts. After a meeting with Korner, Jagger and Richards started jamming with the group.

Having left Blues Incorporated, Jones advertised for bandmates in Jazz News in the week of 2 May 1962. Stewart was among the first to respond. In June, Jagger, Taylor, and Richards left Blues Incorporated to join Jones and Stewart. The first rehearsal included guitarist Geoff Bradford and vocalist Brian Knight; they both declined to join the band, objecting to the Berry and Diddley songs preferred by Jagger and Richards. Jones named the band during a phone call to Jazz News. When a journalist asked for the band's name, Jones saw a Muddy Waters LP lying on the floor; one of the tracks was "Rollin' Stone". Jones was the band's "uncontested leader" during its early years and a key to the band's success.

The band played their first show billed as "the Rollin' Stones" on 12 July 1962, at London's Marquee Club. At the time, the band consisted of Jagger, Jones, Richards, Stewart, Taylor, and an unconfirmed drummer. The band's name was changed soon after to the Rolling Stones. Tony Chapman joined as drummer shortly after, while Bill Wyman auditioned for the role of bassist at a pub in Chelsea on 7 December 1962 and was hired as a successor to Taylor. The band were impressed by his instrument and amplifiers (including the Vox AC30). After Chapman departed in January 1963, the band played gigs with temporary drummers including Charlie Watts, who first played with the band on Saturday, 12 January 1963 at the Ealing Jazz Club, and Carlo Little. Watts agreed to join as the band's permanent drummer, and the settled line-up of Jagger, Jones, Richards, Stewart, Wyman, and Watts played their first gig on 2 February 1963, again at the Ealing Jazz Club.

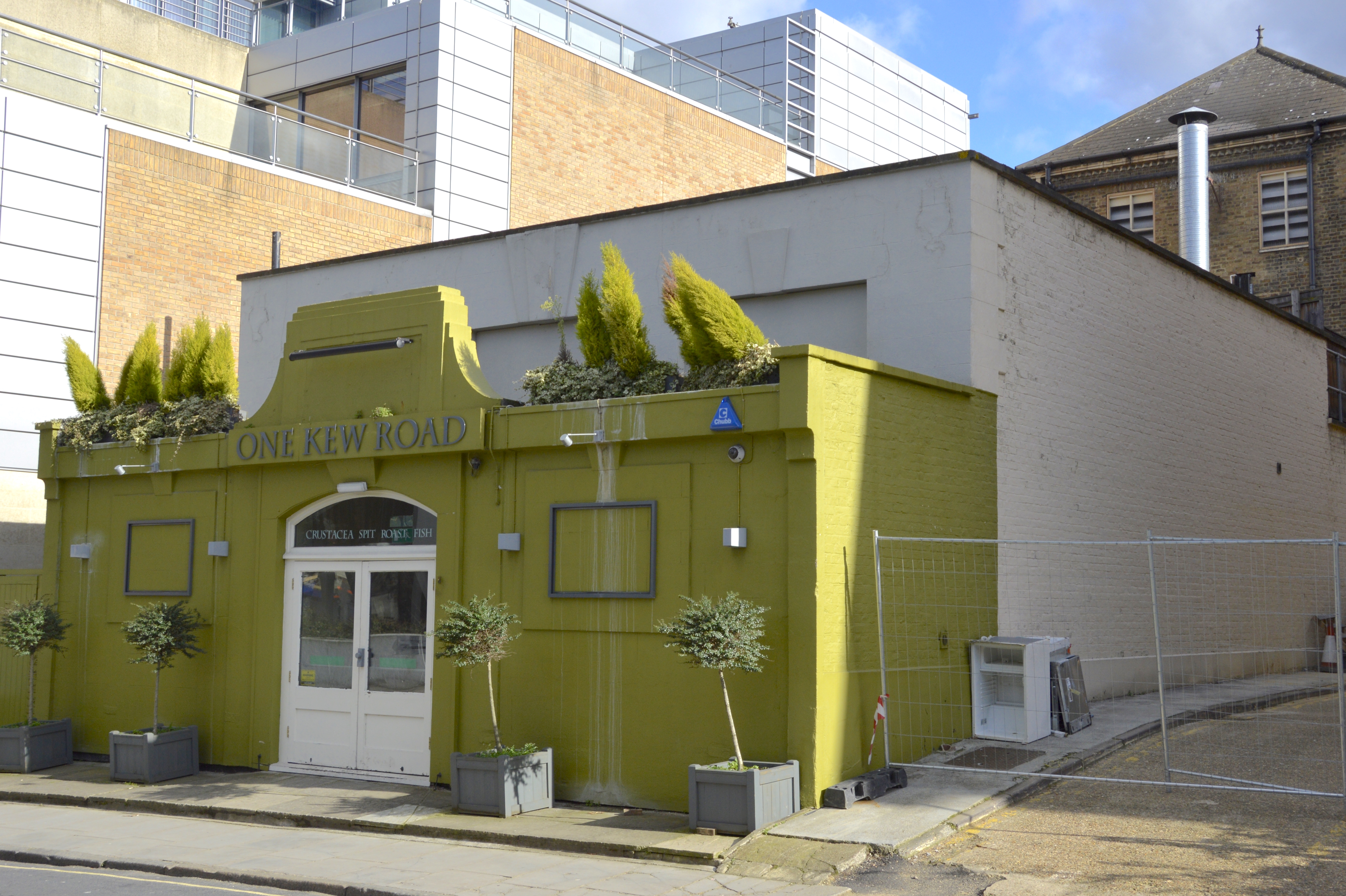
The backroom of the former Crawdaddy Club in Richmond, London, where the Rolling Stones had their first residency, beginning in February 1963

Shortly afterwards, the band began their first tour of the UK, performing Chicago blues and songs by Chuck Berry and Bo Diddley. By 1963, they were hitting their musical stride. Their acting manager, Giorgio Gomelsky, secured a Sunday afternoon residency at the Crawdaddy Club in Richmond, London in February.

=== 1963–1964: Early success ===
In May 1963, the Rolling Stones signed Andrew Loog Oldham as their manager. He had been directed to them by his previous clients, the Beatles. Oldham, then 19, had not reached the age of majority—he was also younger than anyone in the band— and so could not obtain an agent's licence or sign any contracts without his mother co-signing. By necessity he joined with booking agent Eric Easton to secure record financing and assistance booking venues. Gomelsky, who had no written agreement with the band, was not consulted.

Oldham initially applied the strategy of Beatles manager Brian Epstein, by having the Stones wear suits. He changed his mind and imagined a band that contrasted with the Beatles, featuring unmatched clothing, long hair, and an unclean appearance. He wanted to make the Stones "a raunchy, gamy, unpredictable bunch of undesirables" and to "establish that the Stones were threatening, uncouth and animalistic". One of Oldham's first acts as manager was to remove Stewart from the official line-up, though he would be retained as the band's road manager and would continue to provide keyboards in the studio and live (initially off-stage; he would eventually play with the band on stage by the mid-1970s). Oldham explained: "Well, he just doesn't look the part, and six is too many for [fans] to remember the faces in the picture." Oldham also reduced the band members' ages in publicity material to make them appear as teenagers.

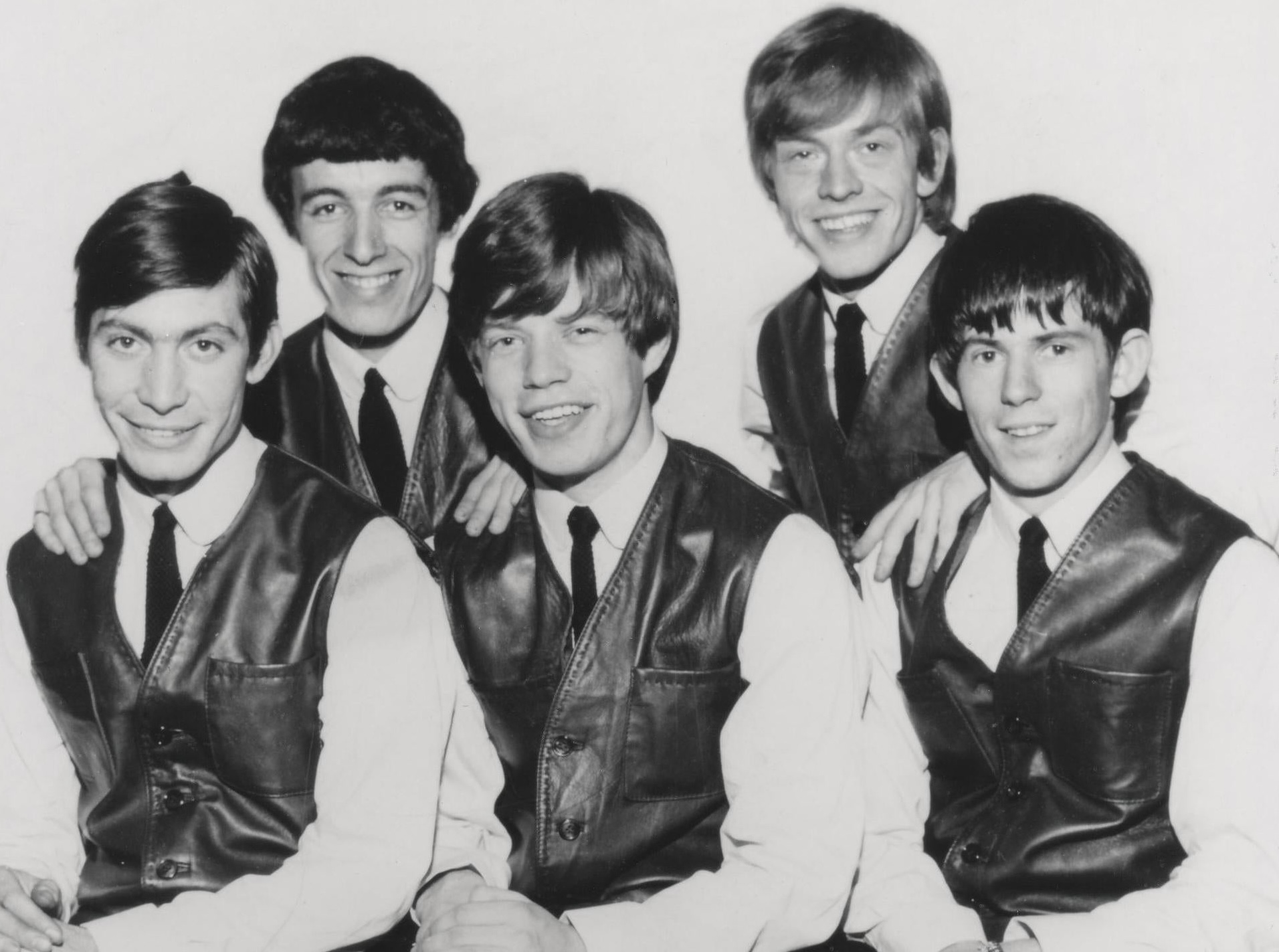
The Rolling Stones in 1963. Left to right: Charlie Watts, Bill Wyman, Mick Jagger, Brian Jones, Keith Richards

Decca Records, which had declined to sign a deal with the Beatles, gave the Stones a recording contract with favourable terms. The band were to receive a royalty rate three times as high as that typically given to a new act, full artistic control of recordings, and ownership of the recording master tapes. The deal also let the band use non-Decca recording studios. Regent Sound Studios, a mono facility equipped with egg boxes on the ceiling for sound treatment, became their preferred location. Oldham, who had no recording experience but made himself the band's producer, said Regent had a sound that "leaked, instrument-to-instrument, the right way" creating a "wall of noise" that worked well for the band. Because of Regent's low booking rates, the band could record for extended periods rather than the usual three-hour blocks common at other studios.

Oldham contrasted the Stones' independence with the Beatles' obligation to record in EMI's studios, saying it made the Beatles appear as "mere mortals ... sweating in the studio for the man". He contrasted the Stones with the Beatles by having them pose unsmiling on their first album cover. He encouraged the press to use provocative headlines such as: "Would you let your daughter marry a Rolling Stone?" In contrast, Wyman says: "Our reputation and image as the Bad Boys came later, completely there, accidentally. ... [Oldham] never did engineer it. He simply exploited it exhaustively." In a 1971 interview, Wyman stated, "We were the first pop group to break away from the whole Cliff Richard thing where the bands did little dance steps, wore identical uniforms and had snappy patter."

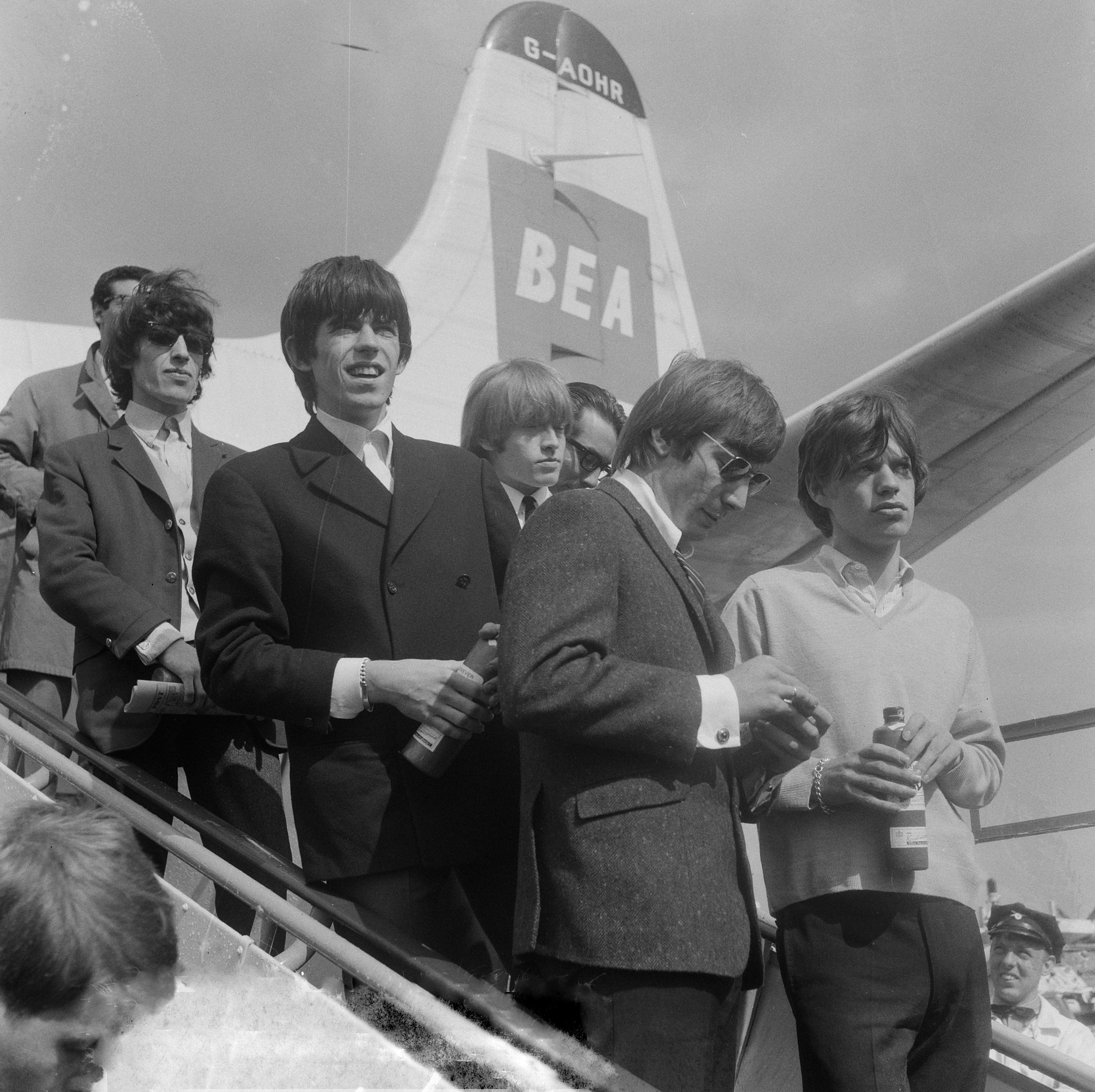
The Rolling Stones arriving at Amsterdam Airport Schiphol, Netherlands, in 1964. From left to right: Wyman, Richards, Jones, Watts and Jagger

The Stones' first single, a cover of Chuck Berry's "Come On", was released on 7 June 1963. The band refused to play it live, and Decca bought only one ad to promote the record. At Oldham's direction, fan-club members bought copies at record shops polled by the charts, helping "Come On" rise to No. 21 on the UK Singles Chart. Having a charting single gave the band entrée to play outside London, starting with a booking at the Outlook Club in Middlesbrough on 13 July, sharing the billing with the Hollies. Later in 1963, Oldham and Easton arranged the band's first big UK concert tour as a supporting act for American stars, including Bo Diddley, Little Richard, and the Everly Brothers. The tour gave the band the opportunity to hone their stagecraft.

During the tour, the band recorded their second single, the Lennon–McCartney song "I Wanna Be Your Man". It reached No. 12 on the UK charts. On 1 January 1964, the Stones were the first band to play on BBC's Top of the Pops, performing "I Wanna Be Your Man". In January 1964, the Stones released an eponymous EP, which became their first No. 1 record in the UK. The Stones' third single, a cover of Buddy Holly's "Not Fade Away" à la Bo Diddley, was released in February and reached No. 3.

Oldham saw no future for an act that gave up the chance to get significant songwriting royalties by only playing the songs of what he described as "middle-aged blacks". Jagger and Richards decided to cowrite songs. Oldham described the first batch as "soppy and imitative". Most songs on the first Rolling Stones album, The Rolling Stones, were covers, with only one Jagger/Richards original, "Tell Me (You're Coming Back)", and two numbers credited to Nanker Phelge, the pseudonym for songs written by the entire band. Their eponymous debut was released in April in the UK. The US edition, released in May, had a slightly different track list and the subtitle England's Newest Hit Makers.

The Rolling Stones' first US tour in June was "a disaster". Per Wyman,"When we arrived, we didn't have a hit record [there] or anything going for us." When the band appeared on The Hollywood Palace, that week's guest host, Dean Martin, mocked both their hair and their performance. During the tour they recorded at Chicago's Chess Studios, meeting many of their most important influences, including Muddy Waters. These sessions included what would become the Stones' first No. 1 single in the UK, their cover of Bobby and Shirley Womack's "It's All Over Now".

The Stones followed James Brown in the theatrical release of the T.A.M.I. Show (1964), which showcased American acts with British Invasion bands. Per Jagger, "We weren't actually following James Brown because there was considerable time between the filming of each section. Nevertheless, he was still very annoyed about it ..." On 25 October the band appeared on The Ed Sullivan Show. Because of the pandemonium surrounding the Stones, Sullivan initially declined to rebook them. However, he booked them for appearances in 1966 and 1967.

Five by Five was issued in the UK in August. In the US, the EP was expanded into their second LP, 12 X 5, which was released in October during the tour. The Stones' fifth UK single, a cover of Willie Dixon's "Little Red Rooster", was released in November and became their second No. 1 single. The band's US distributor, London Records, declined to release "Little Red Rooster" as a single. In December, they released their first single with Jagger/Richards originals on both sides: "Heart of Stone", with "What a Shame" as the B-side.

=== 1965–1966: "Satisfaction" and Aftermath ===
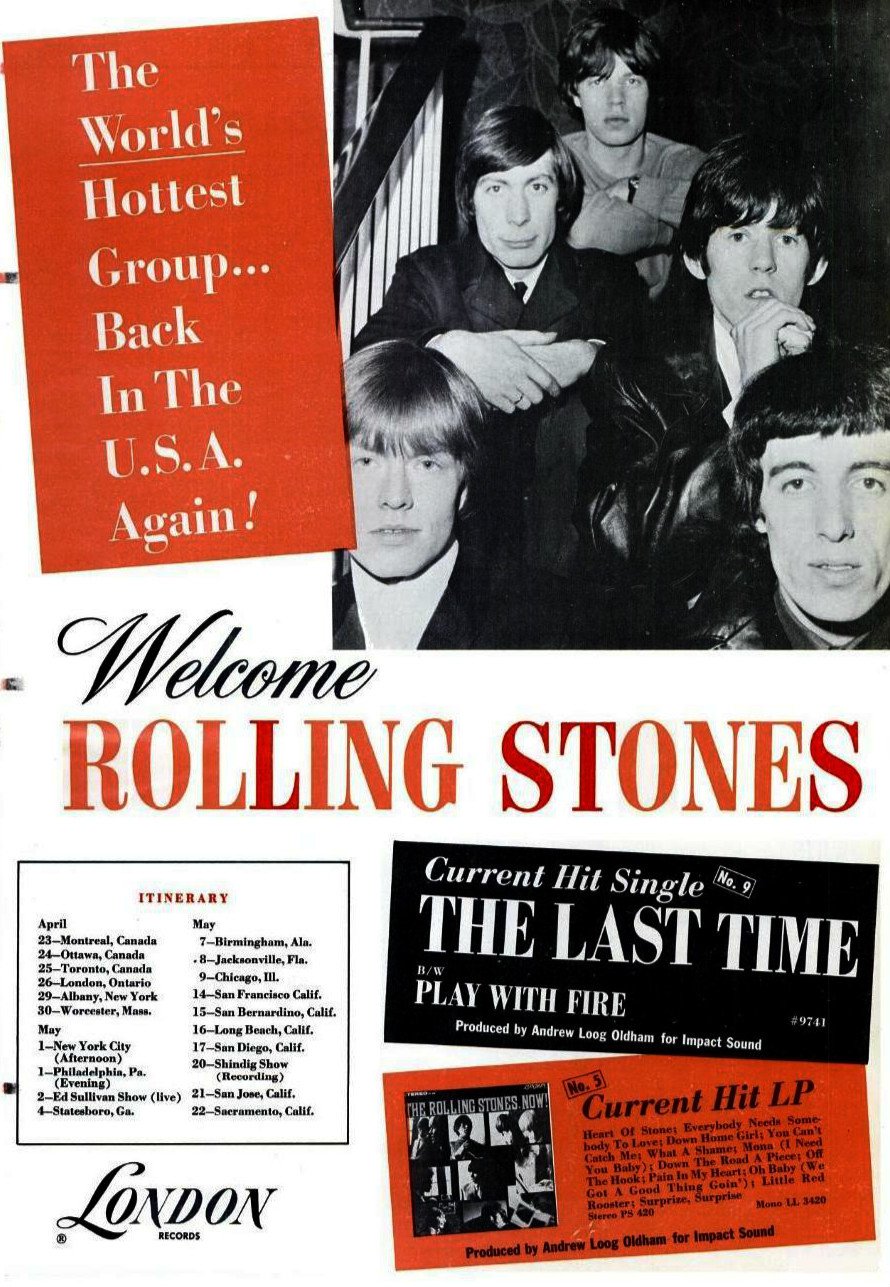
An advertisement for the 1965 Rolling Stones' North American tour

The band's second UK LP, The Rolling Stones No. 2, was released in January 1965 and reached No. 1. The US version, released in February as The Rolling Stones, Now!, reached No. 5. The album was recorded at and RCA Studios in Los Angeles and at Chess Studios. In January and February, the band played 34 shows for around 100,000 people in Australia and New Zealand. "The Last Time", released in February, was the first Jagger/Richards song to reach No. 1 in the UK. Richards called it "the bridge into thinking about writing for the Stones. It gave us a level of confidence; a pathway of how to do it."

Their first international No. 1 hit was "(I Can't Get No) Satisfaction", recorded in May during their third North American tour. Richards recorded the guitar riff that drives the song with a fuzzbox as a scratch track to guide a horn section, but the final cut did not include the planned horn overdubs. Issued in June, it was their fourth No. 1 hit in the UK and their first in the US, where it spent four weeks at the top of the Billboard Hot 100. Steven van Zandt called Richard's riff in "Satisfaction" "the riff heard round the world."

The US version of Out of Our Heads, released in July, also went to No. 1; it included seven original songs, three Jagger/Richards numbers and four credited to Nanker Phelge. The UK version was released in September. Their second international No. 1 single, "Get Off of My Cloud", was released in September, followed by another US-only LP, December's Children (And Everybody's).

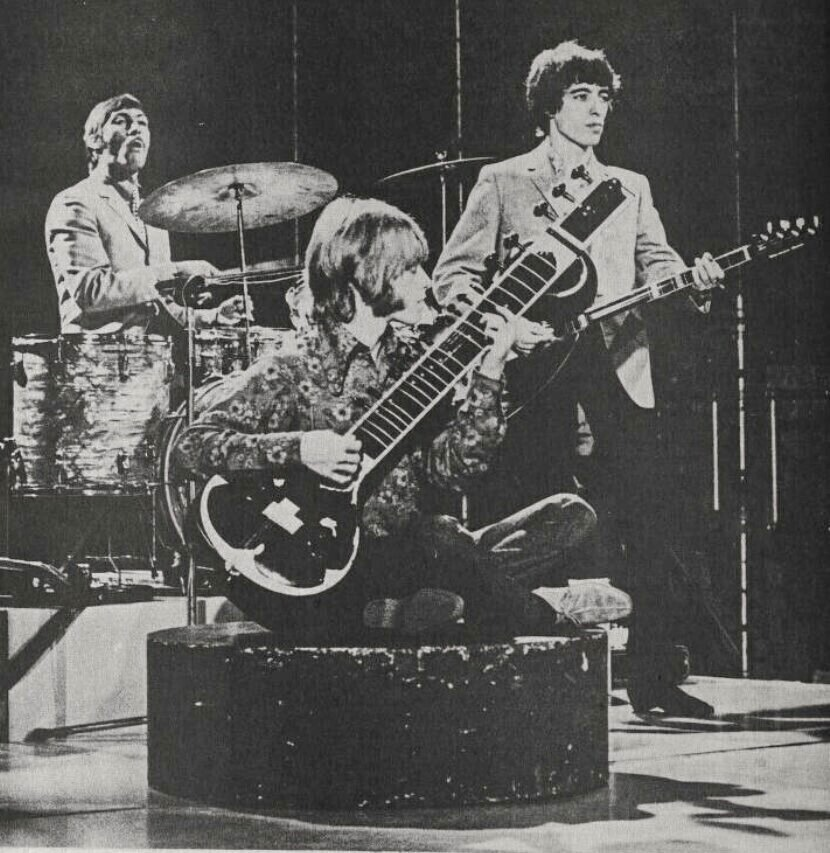
Jones playing a sitar, with Watts and Wyman in the background

Aftermath (1966), their first album of entirely original material; reached No. 1 in the UK and No. 2 in the US. It is regarded as their most important early album. Richie Unterberger writes that "it "did much to define the group as the bad boys of rock & roll with their sneering attitude" while incorporating the influence of folk music à la Bob Dylan. Jones added eclectic instruments: sitar to the Middle Eastern-influenced "Paint It Black", (Note: The comma in the early version of the song title, "Paint It, Black", being later dropped.) harpsichord and Appalachian dulcimer to "Lady Jane", and marimba to "Under My Thumb".

The Stones' success on the British and American singles charts peaked in the 1960s. "19th Nervous Breakdown", released in February, reached No. 2 in the UK and US; "Paint It Black" reached No. 1 in the UK and US in May. "Mother's Little Helper", released in June, reached No. 8 in the US. "Have You Seen Your Mother, Baby, Standing in the Shadow?", released in September, reached No. 5 in the UK and No. 9 in the US. It was the first Stones song to feature brass horns, and was accompanied by one of the first music videos, directed by Peter Whitehead.

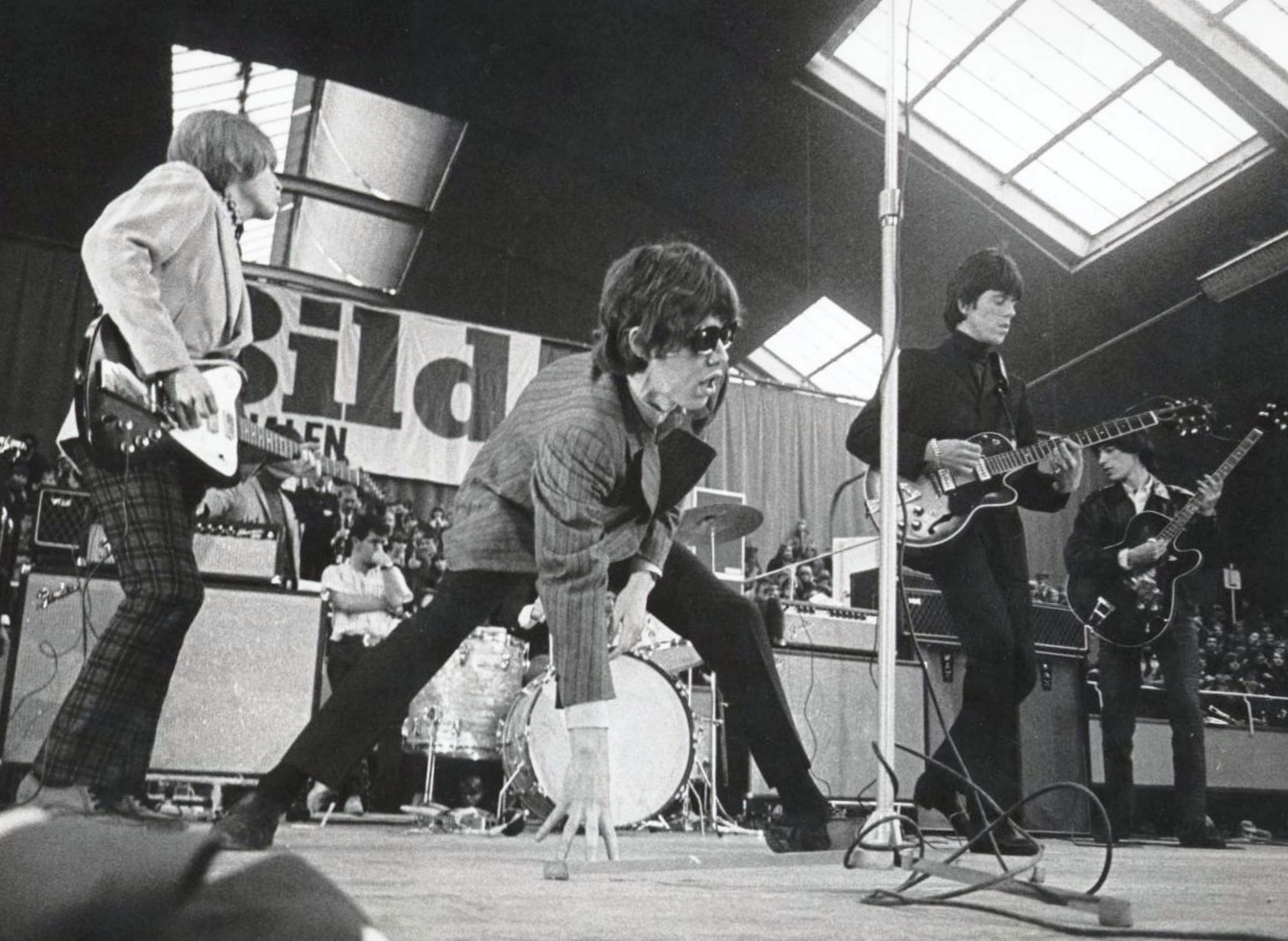
The band performing in Stockholm, Sweden, April 1966

During the Stones' North American tour in June and July 1966, their high-energy concerts proved popular with young people, and alienatied police who had the physically exhausting task of controlling crowds. According to the Stones historians Philippe Margotin and Jean-Michel Guesdon, the band's notoriety "among the authorities and the establishment seems to have been inversely proportional to their popularity among young people". To capitalise on this, London released the live album Got Live If You Want It! in December. Their first greatest hits album, Big Hits (High Tide and Green Grass), was released in the UK in November, a different version had been released in the US in March.

=== 1967–1968: Psychedelia, "Jumpin' Jack Flash" and Beggars Banquet ===
Between the Buttons (1967) (No. 3 in the UK and No. 2 in the US) showed the Stones experimenting with baroque pop, psychedelia and music hall à la the Kinks. Jones incorporated eclectic instruments including banjo, kazoo, double bass, vibraphone and theremin. It was Oldham's last venture as their producer. Allen Klein took over his role as manager in 1965. Richards recalled, "There was a new deal with Decca to be made ... and he said he could do it." The US version included the double-sided "Let's Spend the Night Together"/"Ruby Tuesday" (No. 1 in the US, No. 3 in the UK.) When they performed the songs on The Ed Sullivan Show in January, they were asked to change the lyrics of "Let's Spend the Night Together" to "let's spend some time together".

Jagger, Richards, and Jones began to be hounded by authorities over their recreational drug use, after the News of the World ran a three-part feature, Pop Stars and Drugs: Facts That Will Shock You. The first part targeted Donovan (who was raided and charged soon after); the second targeted the Stones. A reporter who contributed to the story spent an evening at the London club Blaise's, where a member of the Stones allegedly took several Benzedrine tablets, displayed a piece of hashish, and invited his companions back to his flat for a "smoke". The article claimed this was Jagger, but it turned out to be a case of mistaken identity; the reporter had in fact been eavesdropping on Jones. Two days after the article was published, Jagger filed a writ for libel against the News of the World.

On 12 February, Sussex police, tipped off by the paper, (Note: The News of the World was tipped off by Richards' Belgian chauffeur. The chauffeur "developed a severe perambulatory impediment after ratting the band out to the News of the World in the build-up to the Redlands raid. In Richards' words: 'As I heard it, he never walked the same again.' ") raided a party at Richards' Redlands home. No arrests were made at the time, but Jagger, Richards, and their friend art dealer Robert Fraser were subsequently charged with drug offences. Oldham fearing arrest, fled to America. Richards recalled, "When we got busted at Redlands, it suddenly made us realize that this was a whole different ball game and that was when the fun stopped." June saw the release of the US-only album Flowers.

On 10 May, the day Jagger, Richards and Fraser were arraigned in connection with the Redlands charges, Jones' house was raided by police. He was arrested and charged with possession of cannabis. Three of the five Stones now faced drug charges. Jagger and Richards were tried at the end of June. Jagger received a three-month prison sentence for the possession of four amphetamine tablets; Richards was found guilty of allowing cannabis to be smoked on his property and sentenced to a year in prison. Both Jagger and Richards were imprisoned at that point but were released on bail the next day, pending appeal.

The Times ran an editorial, "Who breaks a butterfly upon a wheel?", in which conservative editor William Rees-Mogg surprised readers by criticising the sentencing, pointing out that Jagger had been treated far more harshly for a minor first offence than "any purely anonymous young man". While awaiting the appeal hearings, the band recorded "We Love You", as a thank you to fans. It began with the sound of prison doors closing, and the accompanying music video reanacted the trial of Oscar Wilde. On 31 July, the appeals court overturned Richards' conviction, and reduced Jagger's sentence to a conditional discharge. Jones' trial took place in November 1967. In December, after appealing the original prison sentence, Jones received a £1,000 fine and was put on three years' probation, with an order to seek professional help. "We Love You" featured vocals from the Beatles' John Lennon and Paul McCartney. Earlier that year, Jagger and Richards provided vocals on the Beatles' "All You Need Is Love".

Their Satanic Majesties Request (1967) (No. 3 in the UK and No. 2 in the US) was widely seen as an inferior imitation of the Beatles' Sgt. Pepper's Lonely Hearts Club Band. Satanic Majesties was recorded while Jagger, Richards, and Jones were awaiting their court cases. The band parted ways with Oldham during the sessions. The split was publicly amicable, but in 2003 Jagger said: "The reason Andrew left was because he thought that we weren't concentrating and that we were being childish. It was not a great moment really." Majesties was the first album the Stones produced on their own. It features "African rhythms, Mellotrons, and full orchestration", as heard on "She's a Rainbow", released as a single with "2000 Light Years from Home". Its psychedelic sound was complemented by the cover, a lenticular image by Michael Cooper, who had photographed the cover of Sgt. Pepper. Wyman wrote and sang lead on "In Another Land".

The Stones spent the first few months of 1968 working on their next album. The sessions produced the single "Jumpin' Jack Flash", described by Rolling Stone as "supernatural Delta blues by way of Swinging London". It began their collaboration with producer Jimmy Miller. Beggars Banquet (1968) marked a return to their roots, grafted with country à la the Byrds's Gram Parsons. It featured "Street Fighting Man" (addressing the political upheavals of 1968) and "Sympathy for the Devil". The latter was inspired by Mikhail Bulgakov's The Master and Margarita, given to Jagger by Faithfull. He wrote it as a Dylanesque folk song, and Richards added a samba beat. Controversy over the cover, featuring a public toilet with graffiti covering the wall behind it, delayed the album's release. It was released in December with a different design. (Note: The original cover for Beggars Banquet did not surface until the 1980s.) The creation of "Sympathy" was documented in Jean-Luc Godard's film of the same name.

In 1968, the Stones, on Stewart's suggestion, put a control room in a van and created the Rolling Stones Mobile Studio to be free of the standard 9–5 operating hours of most recording studios. The band lent the Mobile Studio to other artists, including Led Zeppelin, who used it to record Led Zeppelin III (1970) and Led Zeppelin IV (1971). Deep Purple immortalised it in "Smoke on the Water" with the line "the Rolling truck Stones thing just outside, making our music there". The Rolling Stones Rock and Roll Circus, which began as an idea about "the new shape of the rock-and-roll concert tour", was filmed in December. It featured Marianne Faithfull, John Lennon, Yoko Ono, the Dirty Mac, Jethro Tull, Taj Mahal and the Who.

=== 1969–1970: Jones' departure and death, Let It Bleed ===
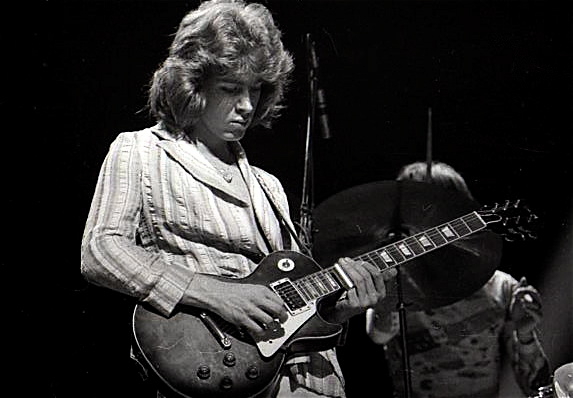
Mick Taylor, who replaced Brian Jones in the band

By the time Beggars Banquet was released, Brian Jones was only sporadically contributing to the band. Jagger said that Jones was "not psychologically suited to this way of life". His drug use had become a hindrance, and he was unable to obtain a US visa. Richards reported that in a June meeting with Jagger, Watts, and himself at Jones' house, Jones admitted that he was unable to "go on the road again", and left the band saying, "I've left, and if I want to I can come back." On 3 July 1969, less than a month later, Jones drowned under mysterious circumstances in the swimming pool at his home, Cotchford Farm, in Hartfield, East Sussex. They auditioned several guitarists, including Paul Kossoff, as a replacement for Jones, before settling on Mick Taylor, recommended to Jagger by John Mayall.

The Stones were scheduled to play at a free concert for Blackhill Enterprises in London's Hyde Park, two days after Jones' death; they decided to go on with the show as a tribute to him. Jagger began by reading an excerpt from Adonais, Percy Bysshe Shelley's elegy for John Keats. They released thousands of butterflies in memory of Jones before opening their set with Johnny Winter's "I'm Yours and I'm Hers". The concert, their first with Taylor, was performed in front of an estimated 250,000 fans. A Granada Television production team filmed the performance, broadcast on British television as The Stones in the Park. Blackhill Enterprises stage manager Sam Cutler introduced the Stones: "Let's welcome the Greatest Rock and Roll Band in the World." Cutler repeated the introduction throughout their 1969 US tour. The show also included the concert debut of their fifth US No. 1 single, "Honky Tonk Women", which had been released the previous day. The band's second greatest hits album, Through the Past, Darkly (Big Hits Vol. 2), was released in September, featuring a poem dedicated to Jones on the inside cover.

"Gimme Shelter"
Sample of "Gimme Shelter" by The Rolling Stones, from Let It Bleed (1969)

Let It Bleed (No. 1 in the UK, No. 3 in the US) was their last album of the 1960s. It opens with "Gimme Shelter", featuring Merry Clayton (sister of Little Feat's Sam Clayton). Jones and Taylor are both featured on the album, and Richards sang lead on "You Got the Silver". The cover shows a surreal sculpture by Robert Brownjohn, topped by a cake baked by Delia Smith. It closes with "You Can't Always Get What You Want", featuring Al Kooper on electric organ and Jagger conducting the London Bach Choir. Greil Marcus wrote that the opening and closing tracks "reach for reality and end up confronting it, almost mastering what's real, or what reality will feel like as the years fade in."

Just after the US tour ended, the band performed at the Altamont Free Concert at the Altamont Speedway, about fifty miles (80 km) east of San Francisco. A Hells Angels biker gang provided security, and a fan, Meredith Hunter, was stabbed and beaten to death by the Angels after they realised he was armed. Part of the tour, and the Altamont concert, was documented in Albert and David Maysles' Gimme Shelter (1970).

In response to the growing popularity of bootleg recordings (in particular Live'r Than You'll Ever Be, recorded during the 1969 tour), they released Get Yer Ya-Ya's Out! (1970). Critic Lester Bangs declared it the best-ever live album. It reached No. 1 in the UK and No. 6 in the US. The band appeared on BBC's review of the 1960s music scene, Pop Go the Sixties, broadcast live on 31 December 1969, performing "Gimme Shelter".

By 1970, the band wanted out of contracts with both Klein and Decca, but still owed them one more Jagger/Richards–credited single. To get back at the label and fulfil their final contractual obligation, the band came up with "Cocksucker Blues"—deliberately making it as crude as possible in hopes of making it un-releasable. The plan worked, and the song has never been officially released.

Amid contractual disputes with Klein, they formed their own label, Rolling Stones Records, to be distributed by Atlantic Records. The logo for Rolling Stones Records, the "tongue and lips", has effectively become the Stones' logo. It consisted of a pair of lips with a lapping tongue. John Pasche created the logo, following a suggestion by Jagger to copy the stuck-out tongue of the Hindu goddess Kali. Sean Egan has said of the logo, "Without using the Stones' name, it instantly conjures them, or at least Jagger, as well as a certain lasciviousness that is the Stones' own ... It quickly and deservedly became the most famous logo in the history of popular music." The logo has appeared on all the Stones' subsequent albums and singles, in addition to their merchandise and stage sets.

=== 1971–1973: Sticky Fingers and Exile on Main St. ===
"Brown Sugar"
Sample of "Brown Sugar" by The Rolling Stones, from Sticky Fingers (1971)

The Stones' first album on their own label was Sticky Fingers (1971). The cover, designed by Andy Warhol, shows a man from the waist down in tight jeans with a functioning zipper, which unzipped to reveal the subject's underwear. In some markets an alternate cover was released. The album contains two of their best-known hits, "Brown Sugar" and the country-flavored "Wild Horses", both recorded at Alabama's Muscle Shoals Sound Studio. "Dead Flowers" continued the band's excursion into country. The album is noted for its "loose, ramshackle ambience"; and marked Mick Taylor's first full album with the band. It reached No. 1 in both the UK and the US. The compilation Hot Rocks 1964–1971 (No. 3 in the UK, No. 4 in the US) was released in December. It is certified Diamond in the US, having sold over 6 million copies, and spent 443 on the Billboard chart.

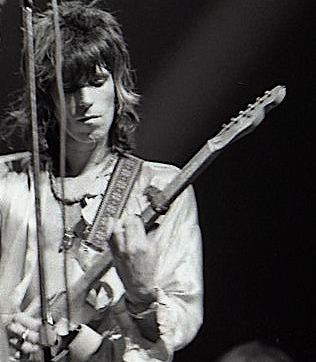
Richards on stage, 1972

Following Sticky Fingers, the Stones left the UK on the advice of their financial manager Prince Rupert Loewenstein. He recommended they go into tax exile before the start of the next financial year. The band learned that they had not paid taxes for seven years, despite being assured that their taxes were taken care of; and the UK government was owed a fortune. Richards rented Villa Nellcôte on the Côte d'Azur, where he sublet rooms to bandmamtes and their entourage.

Using the Rolling Stones Mobile Studio, they held recording sessions in the basement. They completed the new tracks, including material dating as far back as 1969, at Sunset Studios in Los Angeles. The resulting double album, Exile on Main St. (1972), reached No. 1 in the UK and the US. Given an A+ by critic Robert Christgau and disparaged by Lester Bangs—who reversed his opinion within months—Exile is now seen as one of the Stones' best albums. It featured the singles "Happy" and "Tumbling Dice". It has strains of soul and gospel music, particularly on "Shine a Light", a trubute to Brian Jones. Cocksucker Blues and Ladies and Gentlemen: The Rolling Stones (1974) document the 1972 North American Tour; the former film wasn't officially released.

The Stones set up a complex financial structure to reduce their taxes. Their holding company, Promogroup, has offices in both the Netherlands and the Caribbean. The Netherlands was chosen because it does not directly tax royalty payments. The Stones have been tax exiles ever since, meaning they can no longer use Britain as their main residence.

In November, the band began sessions in Kingston, Jamaica, for Goats Head Soup (1973) (No. 1 in the UK and US). Featuring the worldwide hit "Angie", it was the first in a string of commercially successful but critically tepidly received albums. The sessions for Goats Head Soup produced unused material, some recorded.

Another legal battle over drugs, dating back to their stay in France, interrupted the making of Goats Head Soup. Authorities had issued a warrant for Richards' arrest, and the other band members had to return briefly to France for questioning. This, along with Jagger's 1967 and 1970 convictions on drug charges, complicated the band's plans for their Pacific tour in early 1973: they were denied permission to play in Japan and almost banned from Australia. A European tour followed in September and October 1973, which bypassed France, coming, as it did, after Richards' recent arrest in England on drug charges.

=== 1974–1977: Ronnie Wood replaces Taylor ===
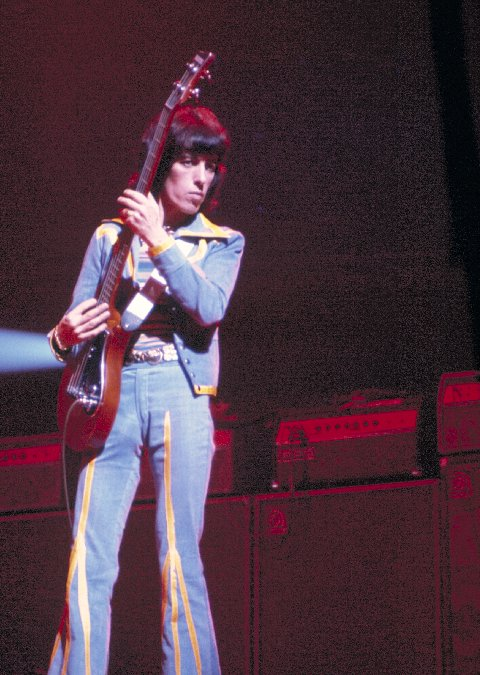
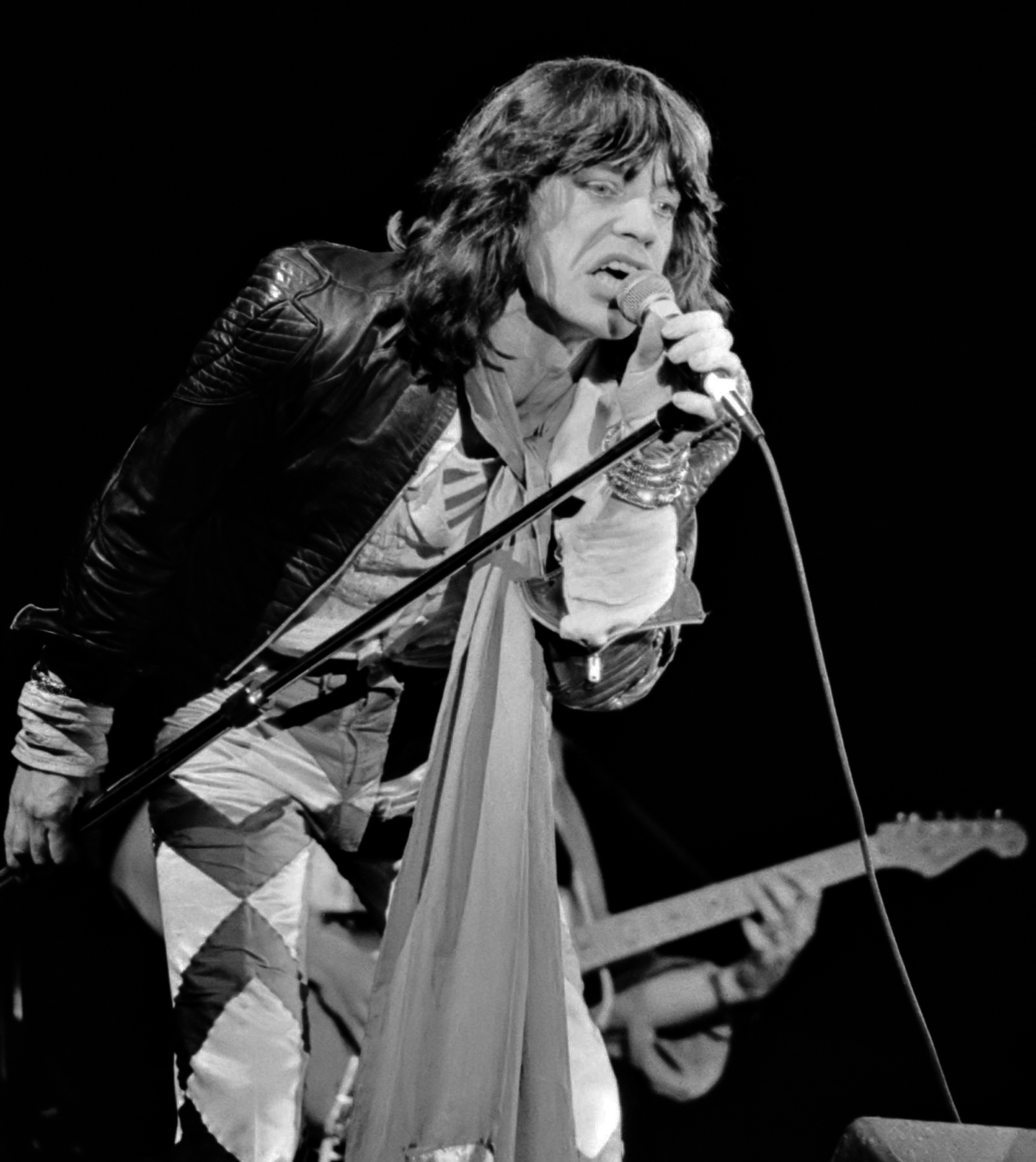
Wyman (left) in 1975 and Jagger (right) in 1976

It's Only Rock 'n Roll (1974) was recorded in the Musicland Studios in Munich, Germany; it reached No. 2 in the UK, No. 1 in the US. Miller was not invited to return as the album's producer because his "contribution level had dropped". The album, produced by Jagger and Richards as "the Glimmer Twins", showed the influence of glam rock. Both the album and the eponymous single were hits.

Taylor began to lose patience after years of feeling like a "junior citizen in the band of jaded veterans". The band's situation made normal functioning complicated, with members living in different countries, and legal barriers restricting where they could tour. In addition, drug use was starting to affect Taylor's and Richards' productivity, and Taylor felt some of his own creative contributions were going unrecognised. At the end of 1974, Taylor quit the band. He reflected: "There are some people who can just ride along from crest to crest; they can ride along somebody else's success. And there are some people for whom that's not enough. It really wasn't enough for me."

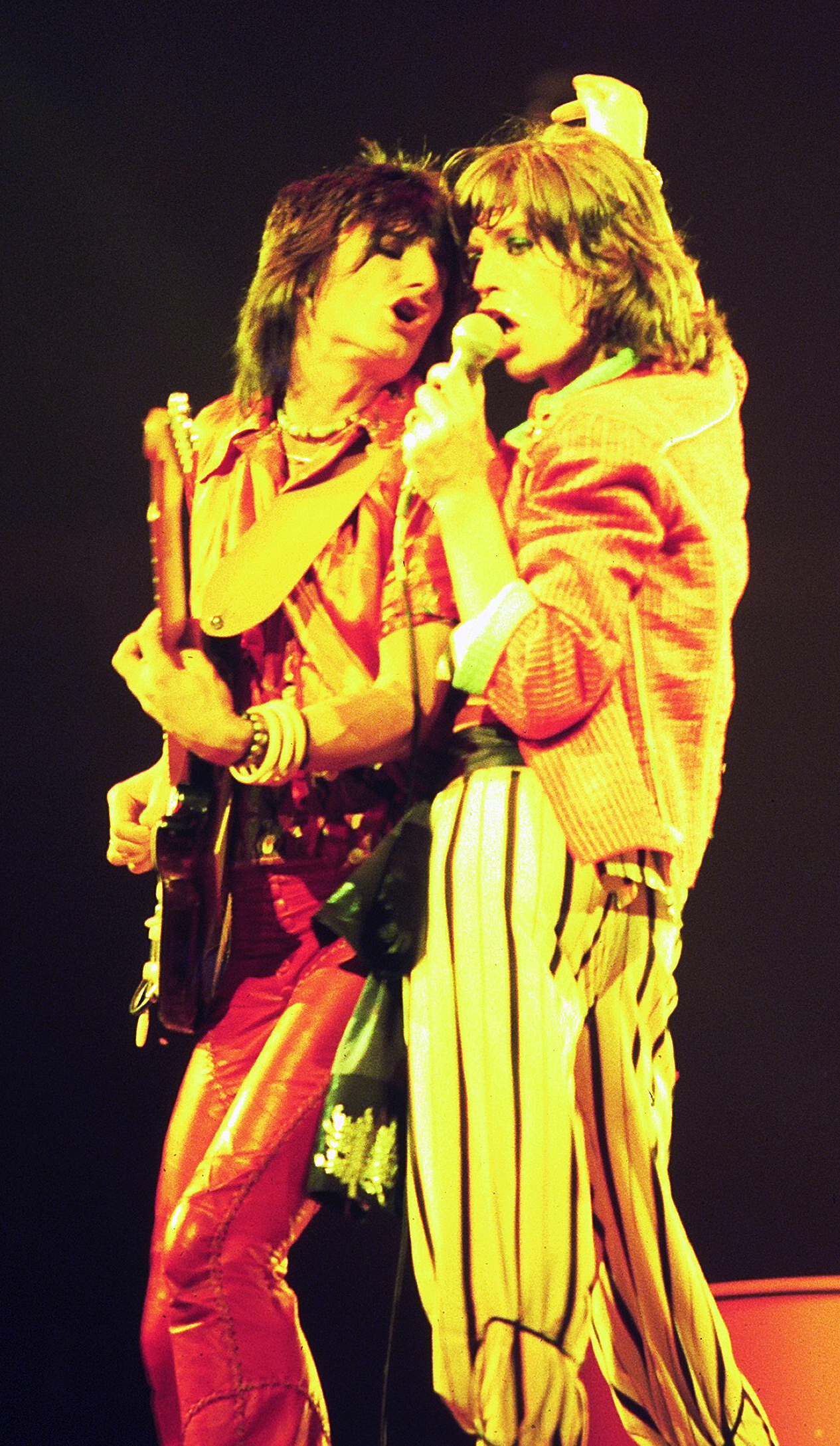
Ronnie Wood (left), on his first tour with the Rolling Stones, with Mick Jagger (right) in Chicago in 1975

The Stones needed a new guitarist, and the sessions in Munich for the next album, Black and Blue (1976; No. 2 in the UK, No. 1 in the US), were effectively auditions. Guitarists as stylistically disparate as Peter Frampton and Jeff Beck were auditioned, as well as Robert A. Johnson and Shuggie Otis. Both Beck and Rory Gallagher later claimed they had played without realising they were being auditioned. American session players Wayne Perkins and Harvey Mandel tried out, but Richards and Jagger preferred the band to remain purely British. When Faces guitarist Ronnie Wood auditioned, everyone agreed he was the right choice. He had already recorded and played live with Richards, and had contributed to the recording and writing of "It's Only Rock 'n Roll". He had declined Jagger's earlier offer to join the Stones, because of his commitment to Faces, saying "that's what's really important to me". Faces' lead singer Rod Stewart went so far as to say he would take bets that Wood would not join the Stones.

In 1975, Wood joined the band as second guitarist for their upcoming Tour of the Americas, which was a contributing factor in the disbandment of Faces. His instalment as an official Stone was announced in 1976; unlike the other band members, however, Wood was a salaried employee, which remained the case until the early 1990s, when he finally joined the Stones' business partnership.

The Tour of the Americas kicked off in New York City with the band performing on a flatbed trailer being pulled down Broadway. The tour featured stage props including a giant phallus and a rope on which Jagger swung out over the audience. In June of that year, the Stones' Decca catalogue was purchased by Klein's ABKCO label. In August 1976, the Stones played Knebworth in England in front of 200,000—their largest audience to date—and finished their set at 7 a.m. Jagger had booked recording sessions at Toronto's El Mocambo to produce 1977's Love You Live,(No. 3 in the UK, No. 5 in the US), the first Stones live album since Get Yer Ya-Ya's Out!.

Richards' heroin addiction delayed his arrival in Toronto; the other members had already arrived. On 24 February 1977, when Richards and his family flew in from London, they were temporarily detained by the Canada Border Services Agency after Richards was found in possession of a burnt spoon and hash residue. Three days later, the Royal Canadian Mounted Police, armed with an arrest warrant for Anita Pallenberg, discovered 22 grams (0.78 oz) of heroin in Richards' room. He was charged with importing narcotics into Canada, an offence that carried a minimum seven-year sentence. The Crown prosecutor later conceded that Richards had procured the drugs after his arrival.

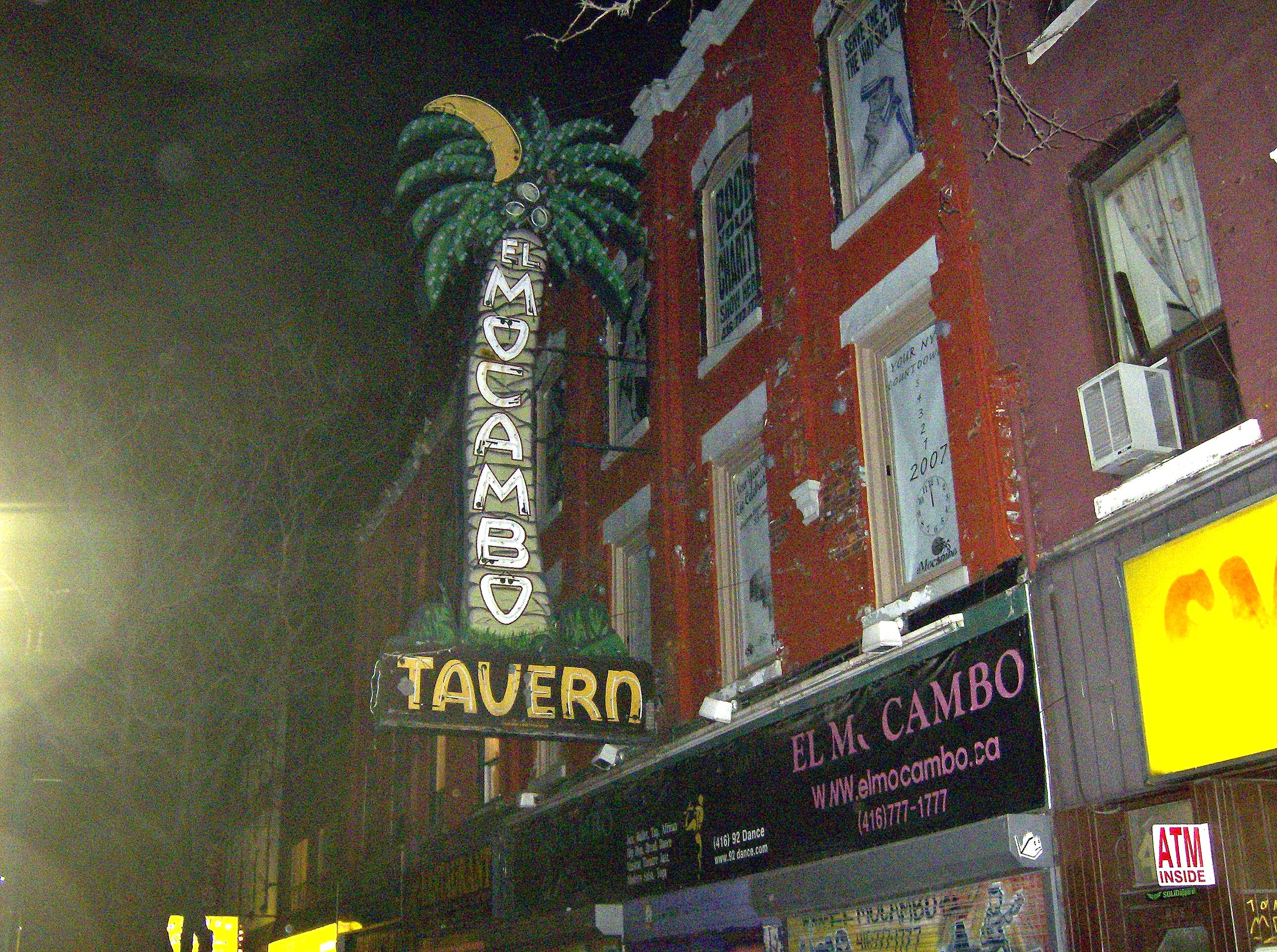
El Mocambo in Toronto, where some of the live album Love You Live was recorded in 1977

Despite the incident, the band played two shows in Toronto, but caused more controversy when Margaret Trudeau, then-wife of Canadian Prime Minister Pierre Trudeau, was seen partying with the band after one show. The band's shows were not advertised to the public. Instead, the El Mocambo had been booked for the entire week by April Wine for a recording session. 1050 CHUM, a local radio station, ran a contest for free tickets to see April Wine. Contest winners who selected tickets for Friday or Saturday night were surprised to find the Stones playing.

On 4 March, Richards' partner Anita Pallenberg pleaded guilty to drug possession and incurred a fine in connection with the original airport incident. The drug case against Richards dragged on for over a year. Ultimately, he received a suspended sentence and was ordered to play two charity concerts to benefit the Canadian institute for the blind in Oshawa; both shows featured the Stones and the New Barbarians, a group that Wood had put together to promote his latest solo album, which Richards also joined. This episode strengthened Richards' resolve to stop using heroin. It also ended his relationship with Pallenberg, which had become strained since the death of their third child, Tara. Pallenberg was unable to curb her heroin addiction as Richards struggled to get clean. While Richards was settling his legal and personal problems, Jagger continued his jet-set lifestyle. He was a regular at New York's Studio 54 disco club, often in the company of model Jerry Hall. His marriage to Bianca Jagger ended in 1977, although they had long been estranged. Although the Stones remained popular through the mid-1970s, critics were generally dismissive of the albums from Goats Head Soup to Love You Live, and sales of these albums failed to meet expectations. By 1977, when punk rock became popular, many people had begun to view the Stones as outdated.

=== 1978–1982: Some Girls, Emotional Rescue and Tattoo You ===
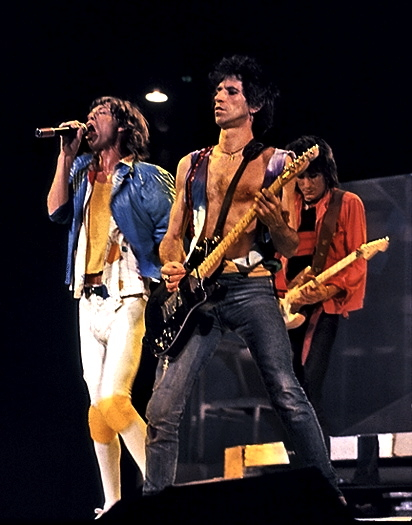
The Rolling Stones performing at Rupp Arena in Lexington, Kentucky, December 1981

Some Girls (1978) reversed the Stones' fortunes with the singles "Miss You", "Beast of Burden", and "Shattered". Partly in response to punk, many songs, particularly "Respectable", were fast, basic, guitar-driven rock and roll. It re-established the Stones' popularity with young people, reaching No. 2 in the UK and No. 1 in the US. Many songs featured the four on the floor beat characteristic of disco. "Miss You" was their last US number 1 hit.

Emotional Rescue was released in mid-1980. During recording sessions, a rift between Jagger and Richards slowly developed. Richards wanted to tour in the summer or autumn of 1980 to promote the new album. Much to his disappointment, Jagger declined. It hit the top of the charts on both sides of the Atlantic and the title track reached No. 3 in the US.

In early 1981, the group reconvened and decided to tour the US that year, leaving little time to write and record a new album and to rehearse for the tour. Tattoo You featured a number of outtakes from earlier sessions, including "Start Me Up" (No. 2 in the US.) "Waiting on a Friend" and "Tops" featured Mick Taylor's unused rhythm guitar tracks, and jazz saxophonist Sonny Rollins played on "Slave", "Neighbours", and "Waiting on a Friend". It hit No. 2 in the UK and No. 1 in the US.

Their 1981 American Tour was their biggest, longest, and most colourful to date, and the highest-grossing of that year. It included a concert at Chicago's Checkerboard Lounge with Muddy Waters, in one of his last performances before his death in 1983. The tour yielded the live album Still Life (No. 4 in the UK, No. 5 in the US), and Hal Ashby's concert film Let's Spend the Night Together (1983), filmed at Sun Devil Stadium in Tempe, Arizona and the Brendan Byrne Arena in the Meadowlands, New Jersey.

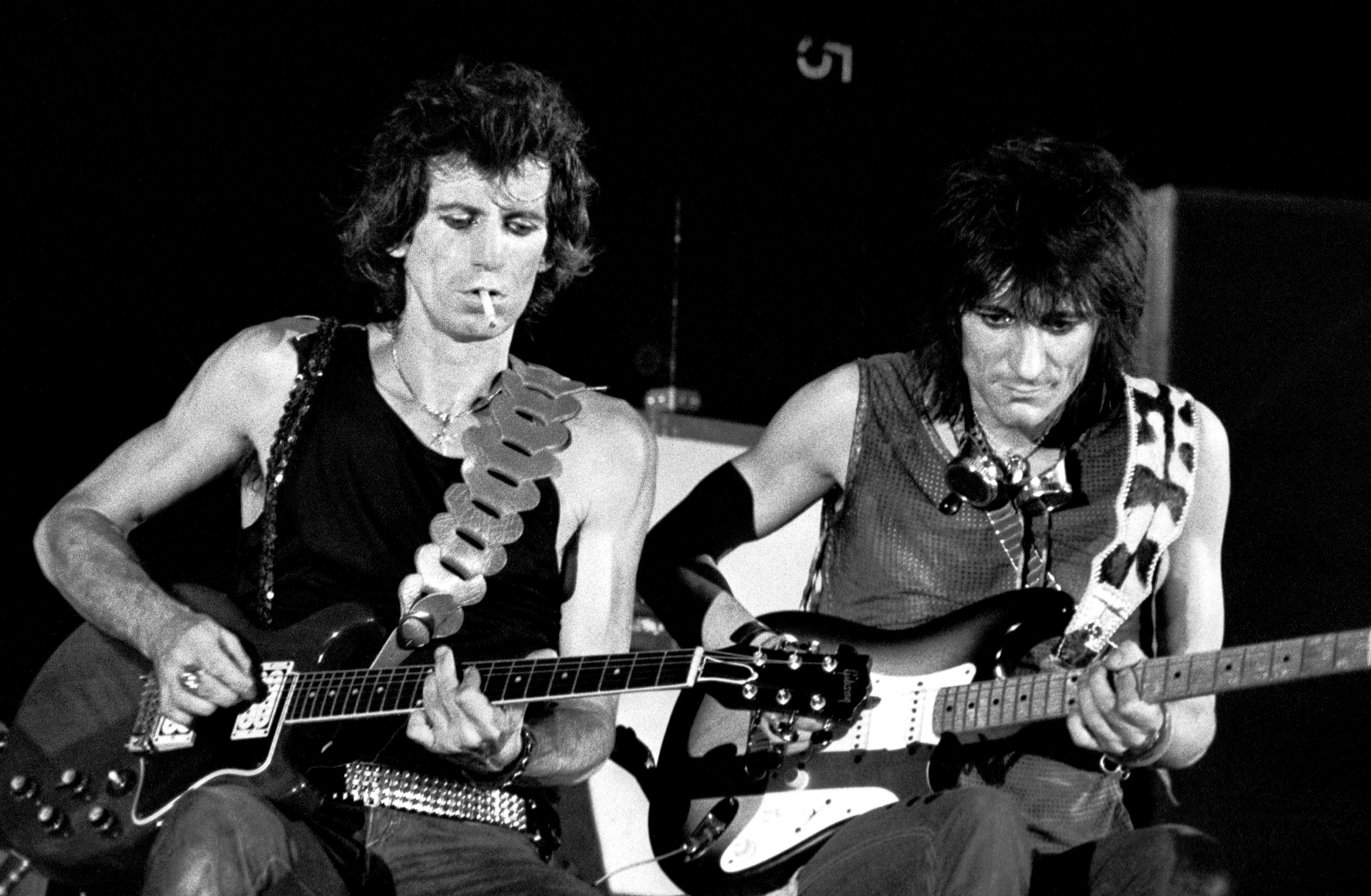
Richards and Wood during a Stones concert in Turin, Italy, in 1982

In mid-1982, to celebrate their 20th anniversary, the Stones took their American stage show to Europe. They were joined by former Allman Brothers Band keyboardist Chuck Leavell, who continues to play with them. By the end of the year, the Stones had signed a recording deal with CBS Records, for a reported $50 million, the biggest record deal to date.

=== 1983–1988: Undercover and Dirty Work ===
Before leaving Atlantic, the Stones released Undercover (1983) (No. 3 in the UK, No. 4 in the US). Despite good reviews and the peak Top 10 position of "Undercover of the Night", it sold below expectations and there was no tour to support it. Subsequently, the Stones' new distributor CBS Records took over distributing their Atlantic catalogue. Bill German's Beggars Banquet was declared the official Rolling Stones newsletter, and Undercover included instructions on how to subscribe. The Jagger/Richards rift had grown significantly. Jagger wanted to weave in strands of reggae, worldbeat, and new wave music, while Richards wanted to return to their roots. To Richards' annoyance, Jagger signed a solo deal with CBS Records and spent much of 1984 writing songs for his debut album.

Jagger and David Bowie duetted on "Dancing in the Street", recorded for Live Aid in 1985. The collabororation reached No. 1 in the UK and No. 7 in the US. In December 1985, Ian Stewart died of a heart attack. The Stones played a private tribute concert for him at London's 100 Club in February 1986.

In February 1986, Wyman alleged to Bill German that Jagger tried several times to throw him out of the band. German chose not to report this in Beggars Banquet given the poor state of relations in the band. That year, it was revealed Wyman had begun a relationship with socialite Mandy Smith when she was 13 years old, which caused a firestorm of publicity.

Dirty Work (No. 4 in the UK and US) was released in March to mixed reviews. Much of the material was written by Richards, with more work from Wood than on previous Stones albums. It was recorded in Paris, and Jagger was often absent from the studio, leaving Richards to keep the recording sessions going. It was the Stones' first album for CBS and their first since Goats Head Soup with an outside producer, Steve Lillywhite. With relations between Richards and Jagger at a low ebb, Jagger refused to tour to promote the album, instead undertaking a solo tour, where his set included some Stones songs. The Stones almost broke up. In 1988, with the Stones inactive, Richards released his first solo album, Talk Is Cheap, which was certified Gold in the US. Richards has referred to this period, when he and Jagger were recording solo albums with no end in sight to hostility, as "World War III".

=== 1989–2001: Comeback, Steel Wheels, Voodoo Lounge and Bridges to Babylon ===
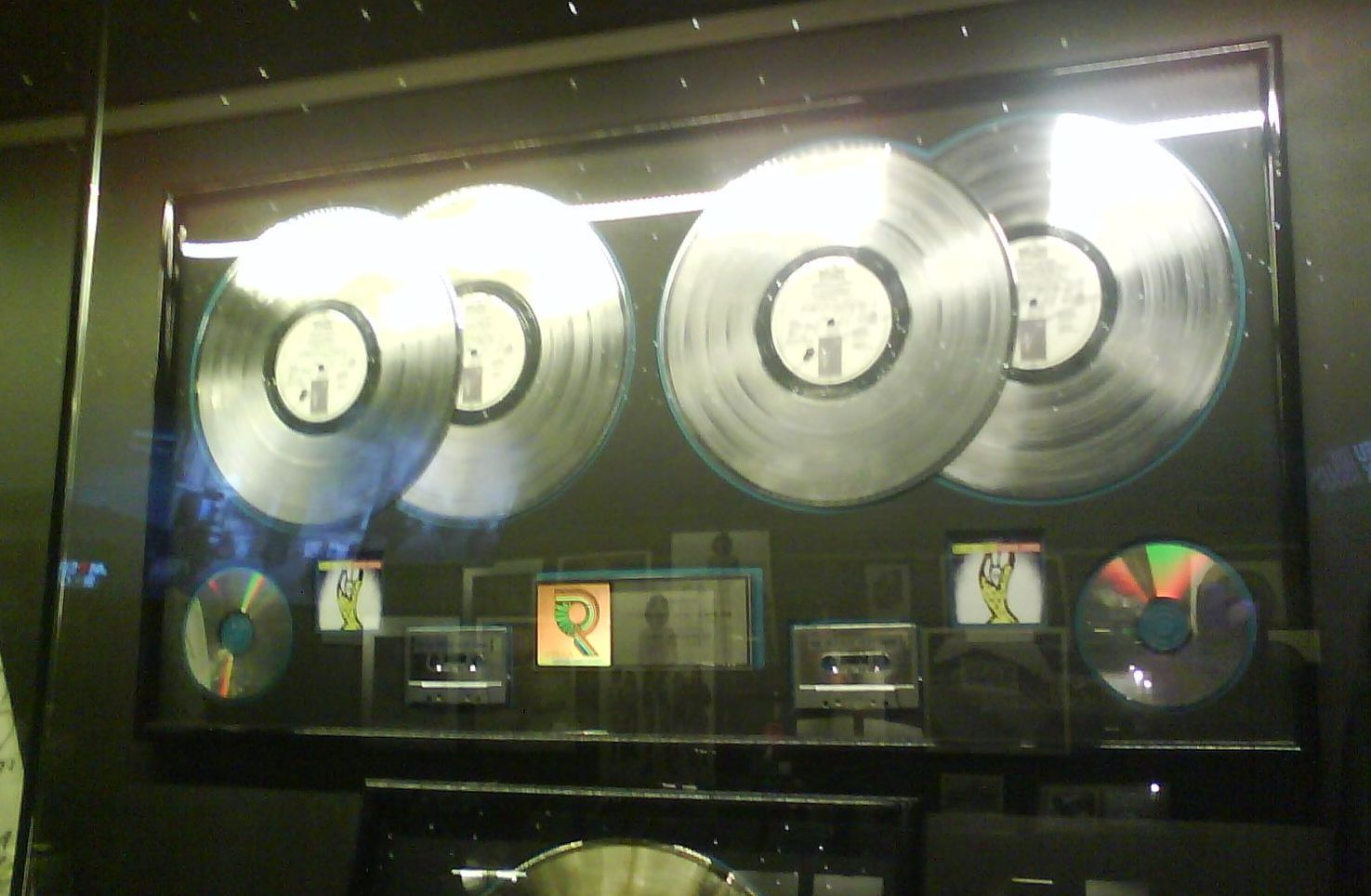
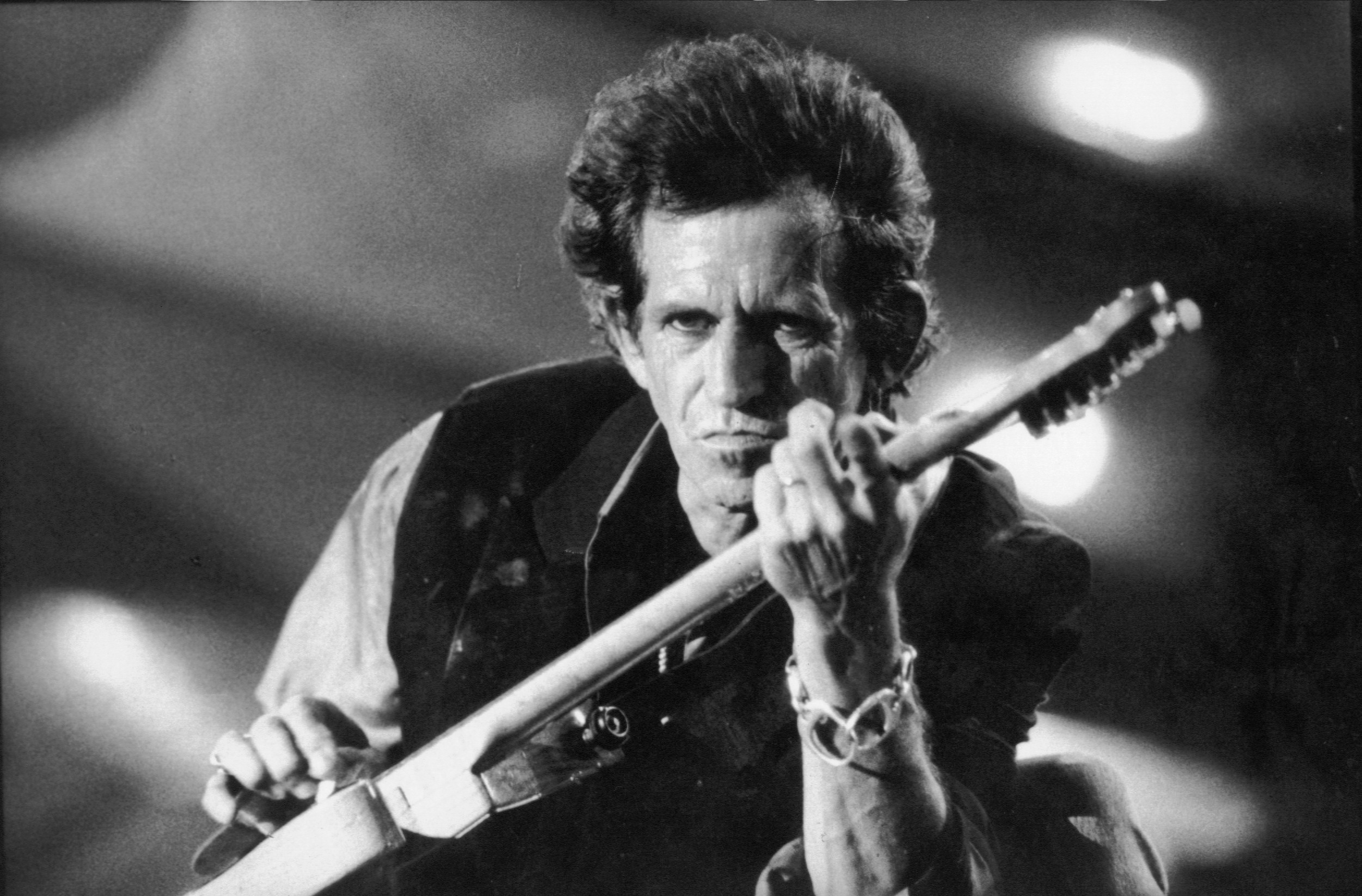
The band's 1994 album Voodoo Lounge was certified multi-platinum. Top: award displayed at the Museo del Rock in Madrid. Bottom: Richards performing onstage in Rio de Janeiro during the accompanying tour.

In 1989, the Stones – Mick Jagger, Keith Richards, Charlie Watts, Bill Wyman, Ronnie Wood, Brian Jones, Mick Taylor, and Ian Stewart – were inducted into the Rock and Roll Hall of Fame, with Jagger, Richards, Wood and Taylor in attendance. Jagger and Richards set aside their animosity to work on Steel Wheels (No. 2 in the UK, No. 3 in the US). Heralded as a return to form, it included the singles "Mixed Emotions" (US No. 5), "Rock and a Hard Place" (US No. 23) and "Almost Hear You Sigh". "Continental Drift" was recorded in Tangier, Morocco with the Master Musicians of Jajouka led by Bachir Attar, coordinated by Tony King and Cherie Nutting and documented by Nigel Finch in the The Rolling Stones in Morocco. Finch directed 25x5: The Continuing Adventures of the Rolling Stones, documenting the band's 25-year history, featuring new interviews with the five current members and archival interview material of Jones and Taylor. 25x5 aired on the BBC in late 1989.

The Steel Wheels/Urban Jungle Tour was the band's first world tour in seven years and their biggest production to date. Openers included Living Colour and Guns N' Roses. Recordings from the tour were included on Flashpoint and in Julien Temple's At the Max, the first concert film in IMAX. The tour was Wyman's last. He published Stone Alone, an autobiography based on scrapbooks and diaries he had kept since the band's early days and formed Bill Wyman's Rhythm Kings.

After the successes of the Steel Wheels/Urban Jungle tours, the band took a break. Watts released two jazz albums; Wood recorded his fifth solo album, Slide on This; Wyman released his fourth solo album; Richards released his second solo album, Main Offender, and did a small tour, including big concerts in Spain and Argentina. Jagger got good reviews with Wandering Spirit, (No. 12 in the UK, No. 11 in the US.)

After Wyman's departure, the Stones' new record label, Virgin Records, remastered and repackaged the band's back catalogue from Sticky Fingers to Steel Wheels, except for the three live albums. They issued another compilation, Jump Back (1993) (No. 16 in the UK, No. 30 in the US). By 1993, the Stones were ready to start recording another studio album. Watts recruited Darryl Jones, a former sideman of Sting and Miles Davis, as Wyman's replacement for Voodoo Lounge (1994) (No. 1 in the UK, No. 2 in the US). The album got positive reviews and went double platinum in the US. Reviewers took note and credited the album's "traditionalist" sounds to the Stones' new producer, Don Was. Voodoo Lounge won the Grammy Award for Best Rock Album in 1995.

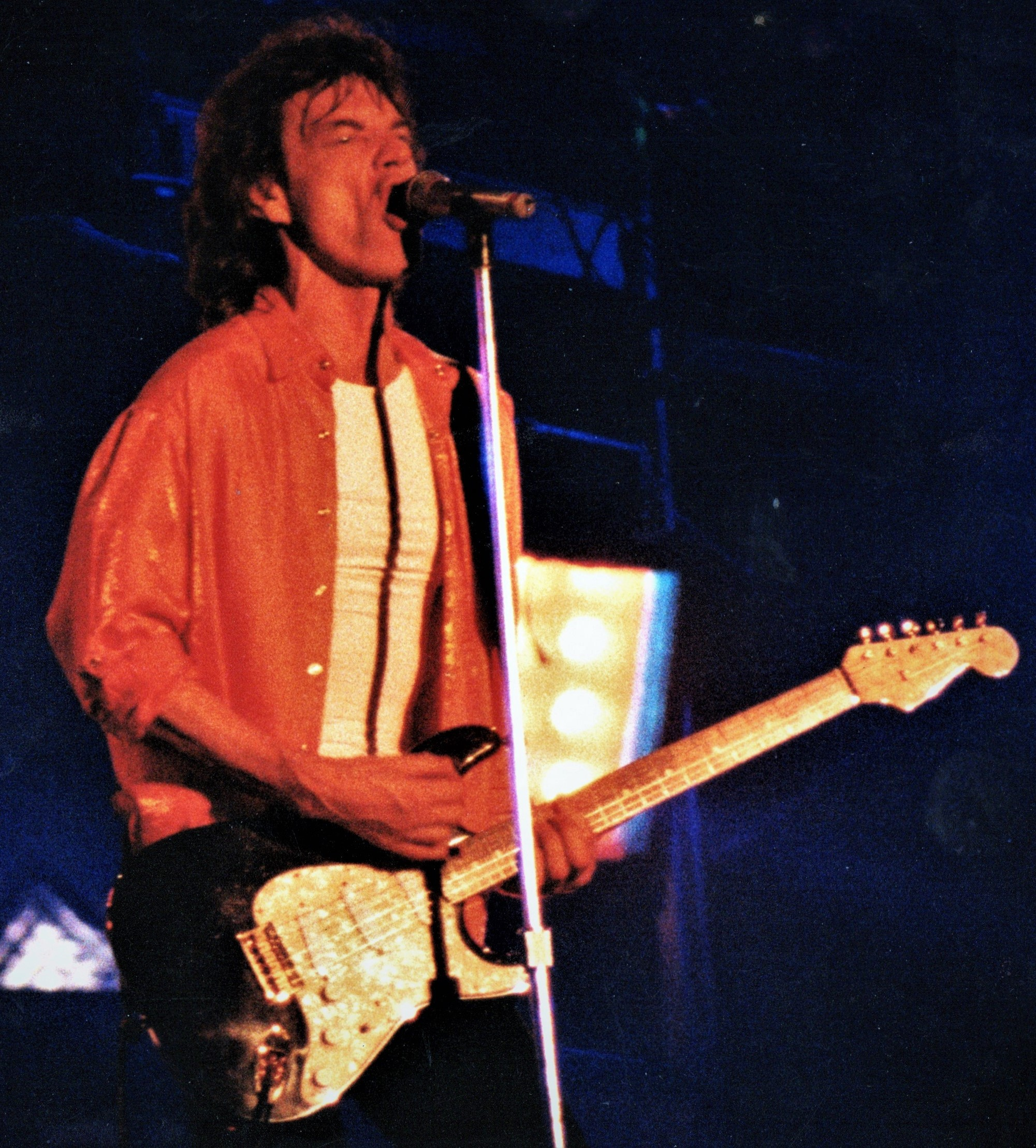
Jagger in Chile during the Voodoo Lounge Tour in 1995

The accompanying Voodoo Lounge Tour grossed $320 million, becoming the world's highest-grossing tour to date. Mostly acoustic numbers from various concerts and rehearsals made up Stripped (No. 9 in the UK and the US.) It featured a cover of Bob Dylan's "Like a Rolling Stone", and rarely played songs such as "Shine a Light", "Sweet Virginia", and "The Spider and the Fly". The Stones played their new song "Love Is Strong" at the 1994 MTV Video Music Awards. The band received the Lifetime Achievement Award at the ceremony.

The Stones were the first major artist to broadcast a concert over the Internet; a 20-minute video was broadcast on 18 November 1994 using the Mbone. The broadcast, engineered by Thinking Pictures and financed by Sun Microsystems, was one of the first demonstrations of streaming video; while it was not a true webcast, it introduced many to the technology.

Bridges to Babylon (1997) (No. 6 in the UK, No. 3 in the US) received mixed reviews. The video of the single "Anybody Seen My Baby?" featured Angelina Jolie and was given steady rotation on both MTV and VH1. Sales were roughly equal to those of previous records (about 1.2 million copies sold in the US). The Bridges to Babylon Tour proved that the band remained a strong live attraction. A live album was recorded during the tour, No Security; all but two songs ("Live With Me" and "The Last Time") were previously unreleased on live albums. In 1999, the Rolling Stones staged the No Security Tour in the US and continued the Bridges to Babylon tour in Europe.

A month after the September 11 attacks, Jagger, Richards, and a backing band took part in The Concert for New York City, performing "Salt of the Earth" and "Miss You".

=== 2002–2011: 40th anniversary tour and A Bigger Bang ===
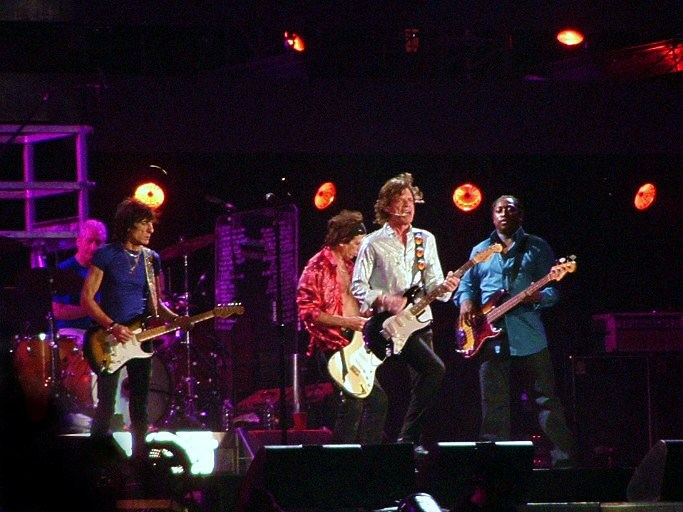
The Stones at San Siro stadium, Milan, during A Bigger Bang Tour, July 2006

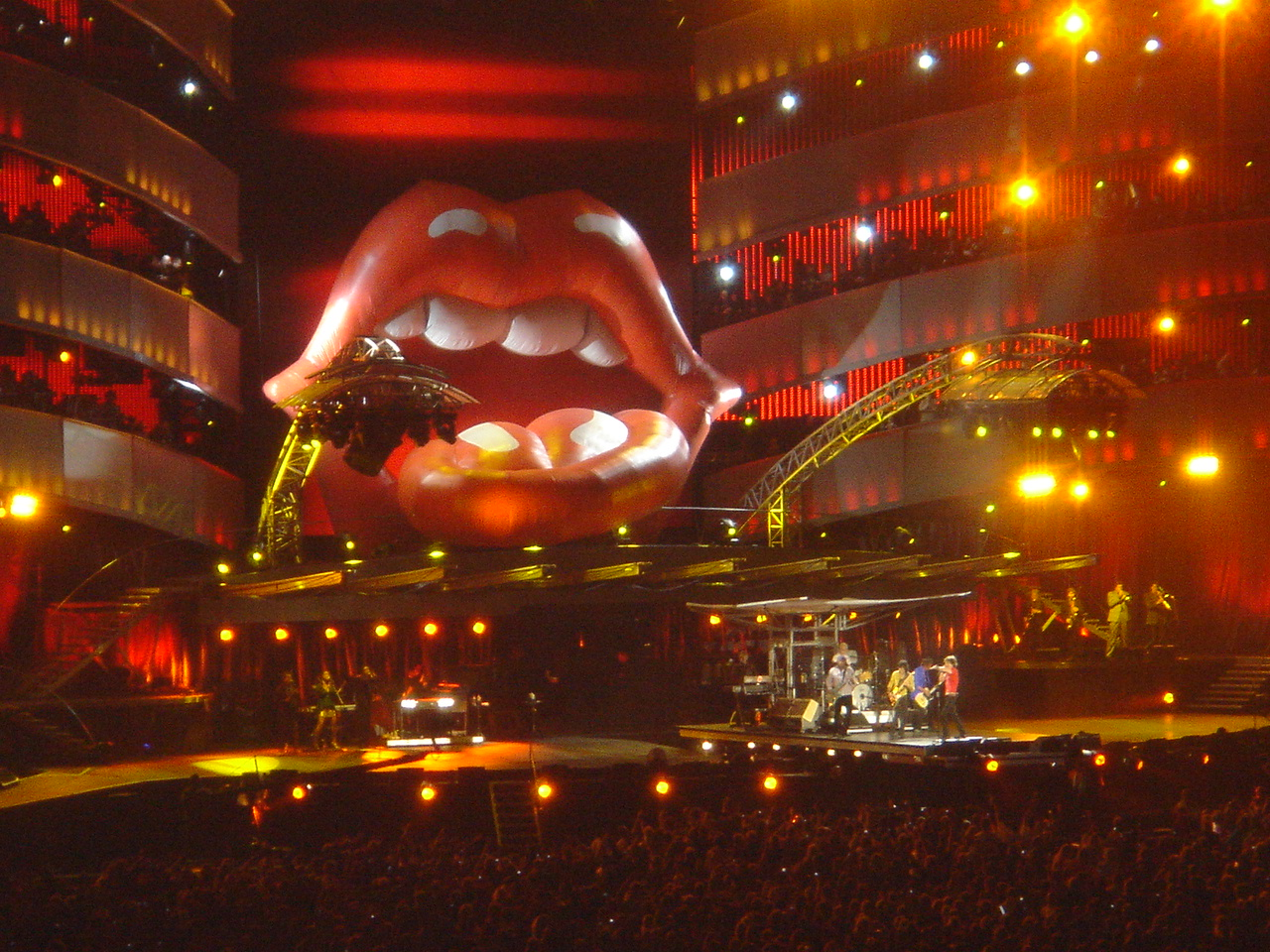
The Stones at Twickenham Stadium in London, August 2006

Forty Licks (2002) (No. 2 in the UK and the US), a greatest hits collection featuring four new songs, celebrated forty years of the Stones. The Stones headlined Molson Canadian Rocks for Toronto.

A Bigger Bang (2005) (No. 2 in the UK, No. 3 in the US) featured a raw sound similar to latter day garage bands like the White Stripes and pointed political commentary, particularly critiquing the war on terror. The A Bigger Bang Tour kicked off in August 2005. In February 2006, the Stones played the Super Bowl XL halftime show in Detroit, Michigan with a medley of "Start Me Up", "Rough Justice" and "Satisfaction". On 18 February, they played a free concert to over one million people at the Copacabana beach in Rio de Janeiro. Richards was hospitalised in New Zealand for cranial surgery after falling from a tree in Fiji. The incident led to a six-week delay in launching the European leg of the tour. Wood was continuing his alcohol abuse rehabilitation programme, but this did not affect the rearranged European tour schedule. The Stones returned to North America for concerts in September 2006, and to Europe in June 2007. By November, the Bigger Bang Tour was declared the highest-grossing of all time.

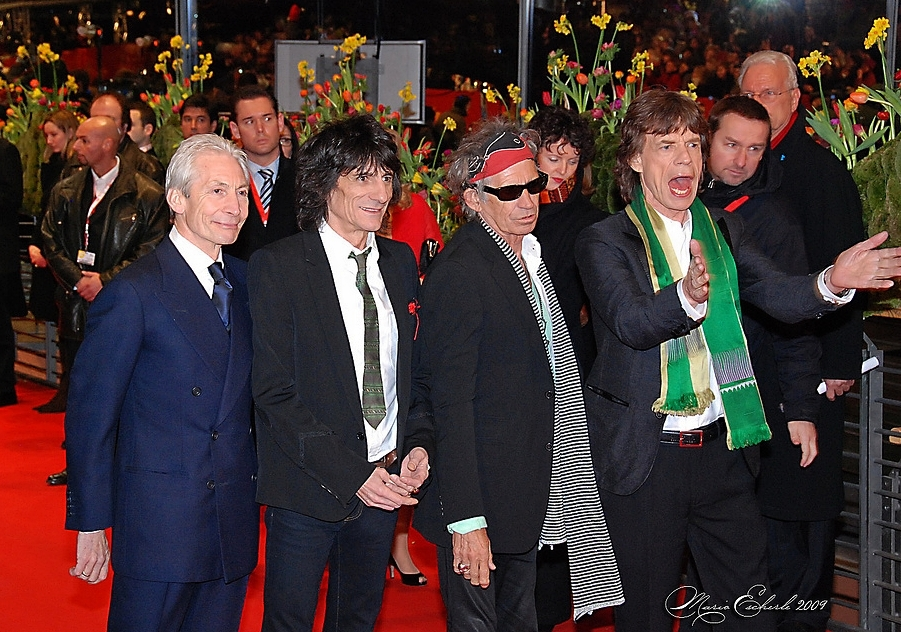
The Stones at the Berlin Film Festival's world premiere of Martin Scorsese's documentary Shine a Light. From left to right: Watts, Wood, Richards, and Jagger.

Martin Scorsese filmed the Stones performances at New York's Beacon Theatre for his documentary Shine a Light (2008). The film features guest appearances by Buddy Guy, Jack White, and Christina Aguilera. An accompanying soundtrack was released, reaching No. 2 in the UK and No. 11 in the US. At the Beacon Theatre show, music executive Ahmet Ertegun fell and later died from his injuries.

The Stones performed at the Isle of Wight Festival 2007 with Amy Winehouse. At the end of the Bigger Bang Tour, the band had grossed $558 million and were listed in the 2007 edition of Guinness World Records. In July 2008, the Stones left EMI to sign with Universal Music, taking with them their catalogue stretching back to Sticky Fingers. That autumn, Jagger and Richards worked with Don Was to add new vocals and guitar parts to ten unfinished songs from the Exile on Main St. sessions. Taylor added a new guitar track to what would be the expanded album's single. "Plundered My Soul", with "All Down the Line" as its B-side, was released for Record Store Day. They appeared at the Cannes Festival for the premiere of Stephen Kijak's Stones in Exile, about the recording of Exile on Main St. The re-issue of Exile on Main St. reached No. 1 on the UK charts, making the Stones the first act to see an album return to No. 1 decades after its release.

Loewenstein proposed that the Stones wind down their activity and sell off their assets. They disagreed, and Loewenstein left after four decades as manager, later writing the memoir A Prince Among Stones. Joyce Smyth, the Stones's solicitor, took over as their full-time manager in 2010.

In 2011, the Stones released The Rolling Stones: Some Girls Live In Texas '78, filmed at the Will Rogers Memorial Center in Fort Worth. Some Girls was reissued as a 2-CD deluxe edition, with twelve previously unreleased tracks.

=== 2012–2021: 50th anniversary tour, Blue & Lonesome and Watts' death ===
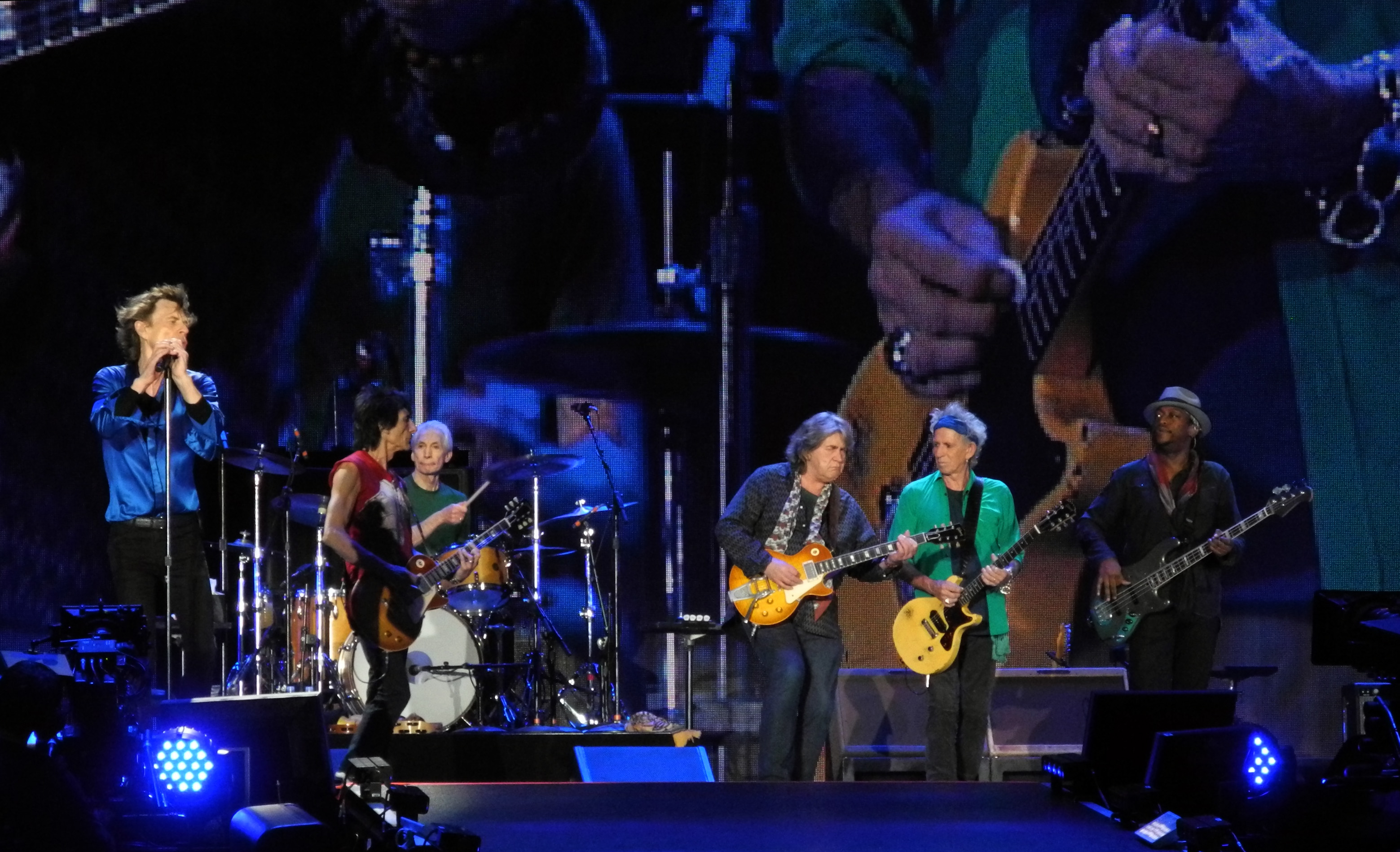
In July 2013, the Stones played Hyde Park for the first time since 1969, with Mick Taylor performing with the band for the first time since 1974.

The Stones celebrated their 50th anniversary in the summer of 2012 with the book The Rolling Stones: 50. A new take on the tongue and lips logo, designed by Shepard Fairey, was used during the celebrations. Jagger's brother Chris performed a gig at The Rolling Stones Museum in Slovenia, in conjunction with the celebrations.

In November 2012, the Stones began their 50 & Counting... tour at the O_{2} Arena in London, where they were joined by Jeff Beck. At their second show Eric Clapton and Florence Welch joined them onstage. The last two dates were at the Prudential Center in Newark, New Jersey, on 13 and 15 December. Bruce Springsteen and the Black Keys joined them on the last night. They played "Jumpin’ Jack Flash” and "You Got Me Rockin'" at 12-12-12: The Concert for Sandy Relief.

The Stones played nineteen shows in the US in spring 2013 with various guests, including Katy Perry and Taylor Swift, before returning to the UK. In June, the band played the Glastonbury Festival. They returned to Hyde Park in July (Note: The 2013 show tickets were not free like they were for the 1969 concert the band performed in Hyde Park.) and played the same set list as in 1969.

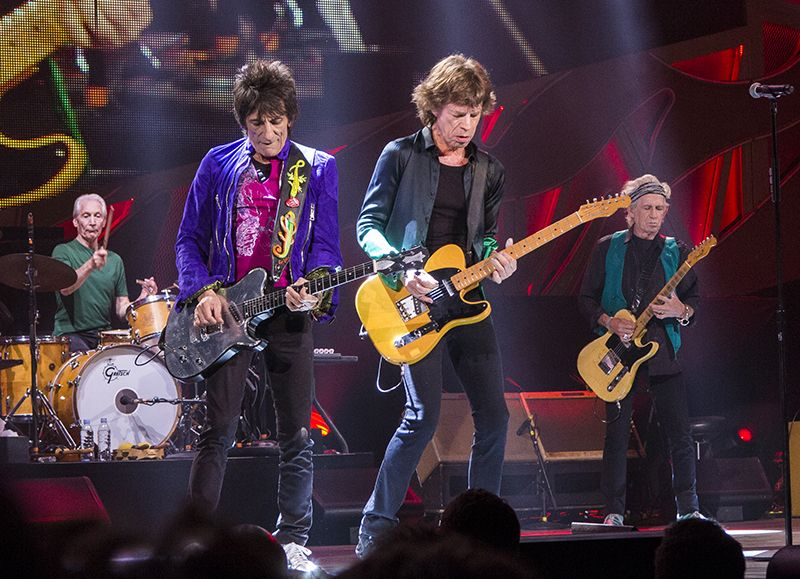
The Rolling Stones performing at Summerfest 2015. Left to right: Watts, Wood, Jagger, and Richards

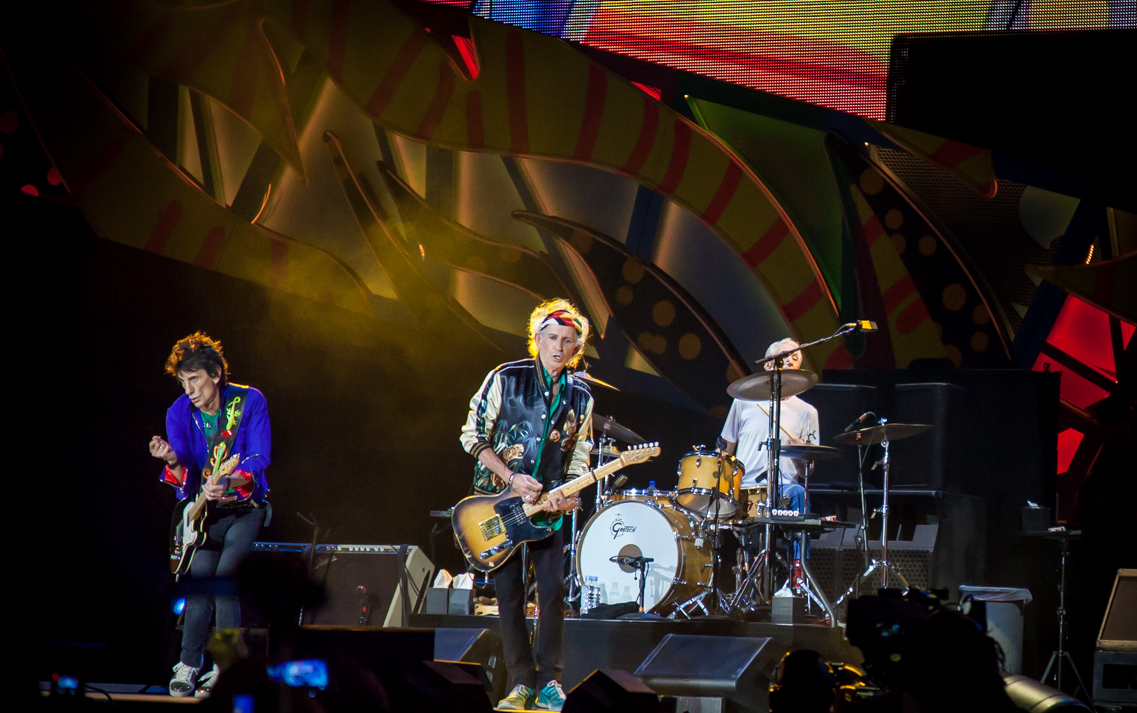
The Stones playing in Havana, Cuba, in March 2016; a spokesman for the band called it "the first open air concert in Cuba by a British rock band".

In February 2014, the band embarked on their 14 On Fire tour. On 17 March, Jagger's long-time partner L'Wren Scott died suddenly, resulting in the rescheduling of the opening tour dates to October. On 4 June, the Stones performed for the first time in Israel. Haaretz described the concert as being "Historic with a capital H". In a 2015 interview with Jagger, when asked if retirement crosses his mind he stated, "I'm planning the next set of tours, so the answer is really, 'No, not really.'"

The Stones embarked on their América Latina Olé Tour 2016 in February 2016. On 25 March, the band played a free open-air concert in Havana, Cuba, which was attended by an estimated 500,000 people. In June, the Stones released Totally Stripped, an expanded edition of Stripped. Olé Olé Olé!: A Trip Across Latin America, a concert film of their 2016 Latin America tour, premiered at the Toronto International Film Festival. The Stones performed at the Desert Trip festival held in Indio, California, on 7 and 14 October, the same nights as Bob Dylan.

Blue & Lonesome (2016) consists of covers of such artists as Howlin' Wolf, Jimmy Reed, and Little Walter. Recording took place in British Grove Studios, London, in December 2015, and featured Eric Clapton on two tracks. The album reached No. 1 in the UK.

On Air (2017), a collection of Stones recordings performed on the BBC between 1963 and 1965, featured eight songs they had never recorded or released commercially.

In May 2017, the No Filter Tour was announced. It was later extended to go from May to July 2018, adding fourteen new dates in the UK and Europe, making it their first UK tour since 2006. In March 2019, it was announced that Jagger would be undergoing heart surgery, forcing the band to postpone the North American leg of the No Filter Tour. In April 2019, it was announced that Jagger had completed his surgery and could be released from hospital. The Stones announced that the No Filter Tour would resume in June. In March 2020, the No Filter Tour was postponed due to the COVID-19 pandemic.

The Stones were headliners of Global Citizen's One World: Together at Home, an event supporting frontline healthcare workers and the World Health Organization during the COVID-19 pandemic. In April, Jagger announced the release of "Living in a Ghost Town", a new Stones song they "thought would resonate through the times we're living in". It reached number 1 on the German Singles Chart, the first time the Stones had reached the top spot in 52 years, and making them the oldest artists ever to do so.

Goats Head Soup was reissued on 4 September 2020 with unreleased outtakes: "Criss Cross", which was released as a single and music video on 9 July 2020; "Scarlet", featuring Jimmy Page; and "All the Rage". On 11 September 2020, the album topped the UK Albums Chart, making the Stones the first artist to top the chart in six different decades.

In August 2021, it was announced that Watts would undergo medical treatment and would not perform on the remainder of the No Filter Tour; longtime Stones associate Steve Jordan filled in. Watts died on 24 August 2021, at the age of 80, in a London hospital surrounded by family. For 10 days, the contents of the Stones' official website were replaced with a picture of Watts. The band showed pictures and videos of Watts at the beginning of each show on the No Filter Tour.

=== 2022–present: 60th anniversary tour, Hackney Diamonds and Foreign Tongues ===
The Stones began the Sixty tour in 2022, with Jordan on drums.

Following reports in February 2023 that Paul McCartney and Ringo Starr would appear on their new album, representatives for the band confirmed that McCartney would appear but stated that Starr would not.

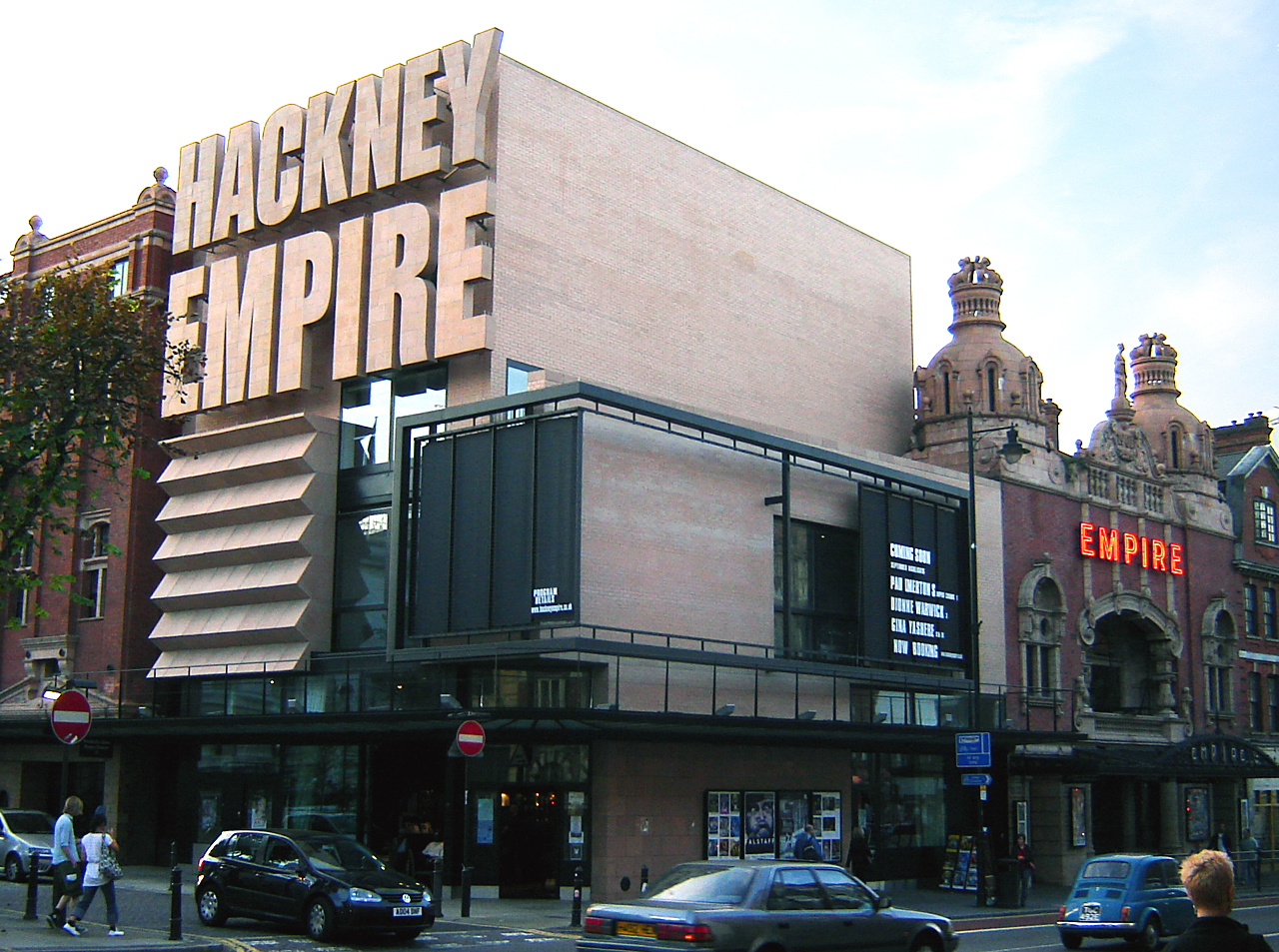
The Stones announced their 2023 album, Hackney Diamonds, at the Hackney Empire in London (pictured) in a news conference at the venue.

In August 2023, an Archant advertisement alluded to several Stones hits, and linked to the fictitious jeweller "Hackney Diamonds"; the band's logo dotted the "i" in "diamonds".

Jagger, Richards and Wood appeared in a live Q&A with Jimmy Fallon announcing the release of Hackney Diamonds (2023). The album features two songs Watts recorded with the band. It also marks Wyman's second studio recording with the Stones since 1991. "Angry", the album's first single and music video (starring Sydney Sweeney), was released during the Q&A. Alexis Petridis credited producer Andrew Watt, writing that the music "suggest[s] the presence of someone who knows how to make contemporary hits, and there's a light modern sheen to the production that prevents it sounding like a determined recreation of the Stones' past". McCartney, Elton John, Lady Gaga and Stevie Wonder appeared on the album.

The Hackney Diamonds Tour took place from 28 April to 21 July 2024 and was well received, with the Los Angeles Times calling the band "still as dangerous and vital as ever", a sentiment shared by the New York Times. Wood confirmed in a May 2025 interview with the Times that the band is still planning a new album.

Under the pseudonym "The Cockroaches", the Stones issued to select record stores "Rough and Twisted", from their forthcoming album. Reviewing the single for The Telegraph, Neil McCormick called it a "raucously fun belter that wouldn't sound out of place on Exile on Main Street", declaring "it might just be the summer of The Beatles and the Stones. Rock and roll will never die."

Foreign Tongues (2026) features guests including McCartney, Chad Smith, Robert Smith and a song recorded by Watts before his death. David Simpson called it "a thoroughly modern-sounding, occasionally political record that has the band confronting the world around them and their remaining time within it".

== Musical development ==
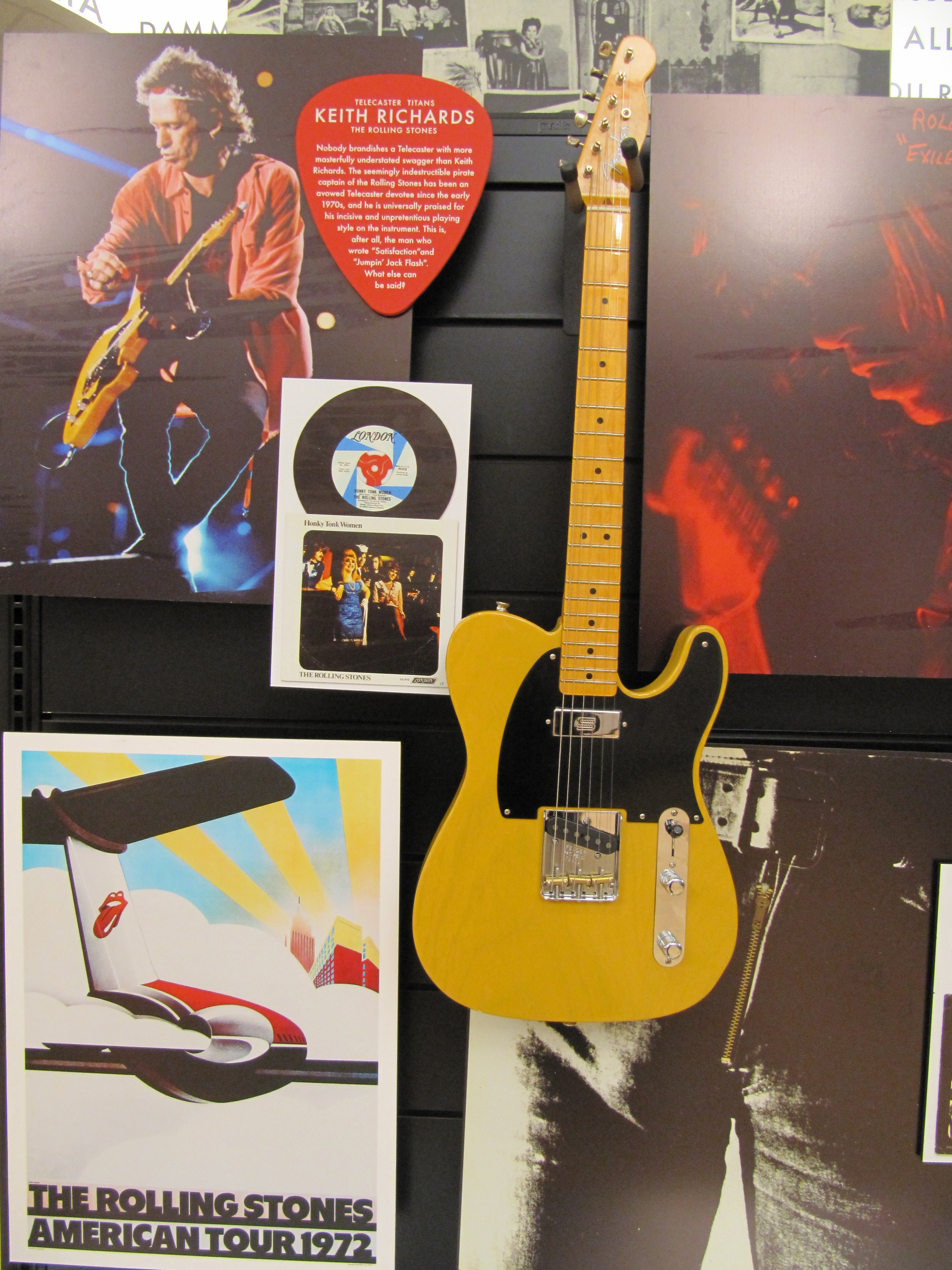
A copy of the signature Telecaster used by Keith Richards, known as "Micawber", in Fender's factory museum

The Rolling Stones have assimilated various musical genres into their own collective sound. Throughout their career, their style has been marked by a continual reference to and reliance on musical styles including blues, R&B, psychedelia, country, folk, reggae, dance, and world music—exemplified by Jones' collaboration with the Master Musicians of Jajouka—as well as traditional English styles that use stringed instruments such as harps. Brian Jones experimented with the use of non-traditional instruments, such as the sitar and slide guitar, in their early days.

According to biographer Stephen Thomas Erlewine, the Stones "pioneered the gritty, hard-driving blues-based rock & roll that came to define hard rock" with a "strong yet subtly swinging rhythm" provided by Wyman and Watts. Jagger and Richards had a shared admiration of Jimmy Reed, Muddy Waters, and Howlin' Wolf. Little Walter influenced Brian Jones. Richards recalls, "He was more into T-Bone Walker and jazz blues stuff. We'd turn him onto Chuck Berry and say, 'Look, it's all the same shit, man, and you can do it.'" Charlie Watts, a traditional jazz drummer, was also introduced to the blues through his association with the pair, stating in 2003, "Keith and Brian turned me on to Jimmy Reed and people like that. I learned that Earl Phillips was playing on those records like a jazz drummer, playing swing, with a straight four." Jagger, recalling when he first heard the likes of Chuck Berry, Bo Diddley, Muddy Waters, Fats Domino, and other major American R&B artists, said it "seemed the most real thing" he had heard up to that point. Similarly, Richards, describing the first time he heard Muddy Waters, said it was the "most powerful music [he had] ever heard ... the most expressive". He recalled, "when you think of some dopey, spotty seventeen year old from Dartford, who wants to be Muddy Waters—and there were a lot of us—in a way, very pathetic, but in another way, [it was] very ... heartwarming".

Despite the Stones' predilection for blues and R&B numbers on their early live set lists, the first original compositions by the band reflected a more wide-ranging interest. Richie Unterberger described the first Jagger/Richards single, "Tell Me (You're Coming Back)", as a "pop rock ballad ... When [Jagger and Richards] began to write songs, they were usually not derived from the blues, but were often surprisingly fey, slow, Mersey-type pop numbers". "As Tears Go By", the ballad originally written for Marianne Faithfull, was one of the first songs written by Jagger and Richards and one of many written by the duo for other artists. Jagger said of the song, "It's a relatively mature song considering the rest of the output at the time. And we didn't think of [recording] it, because the Rolling Stones were a butch blues group." The Rolling Stones did later record a version which became a top five hit in the US.

Richards said of their early writing experiences, "The amazing thing is that although Mick and I thought these songs were really puerile and kindergarten-time, every one that got put out made a decent showing in the charts. That gave us extraordinary confidence to carry on, because at the beginning songwriting was something we were going to do in order to say to Andrew [Loog Oldham], 'Well, at least we gave it a try ...'" Jagger opined, "We were very pop-orientated. We didn't sit around listening to Muddy Waters; we listened to everything. In some ways it's easy to write to order ... Keith and I got into the groove of writing those kind of tunes; they were done in ten minutes. I think we thought it was a bit of a laugh, and it turned out to be something of an apprenticeship for us."

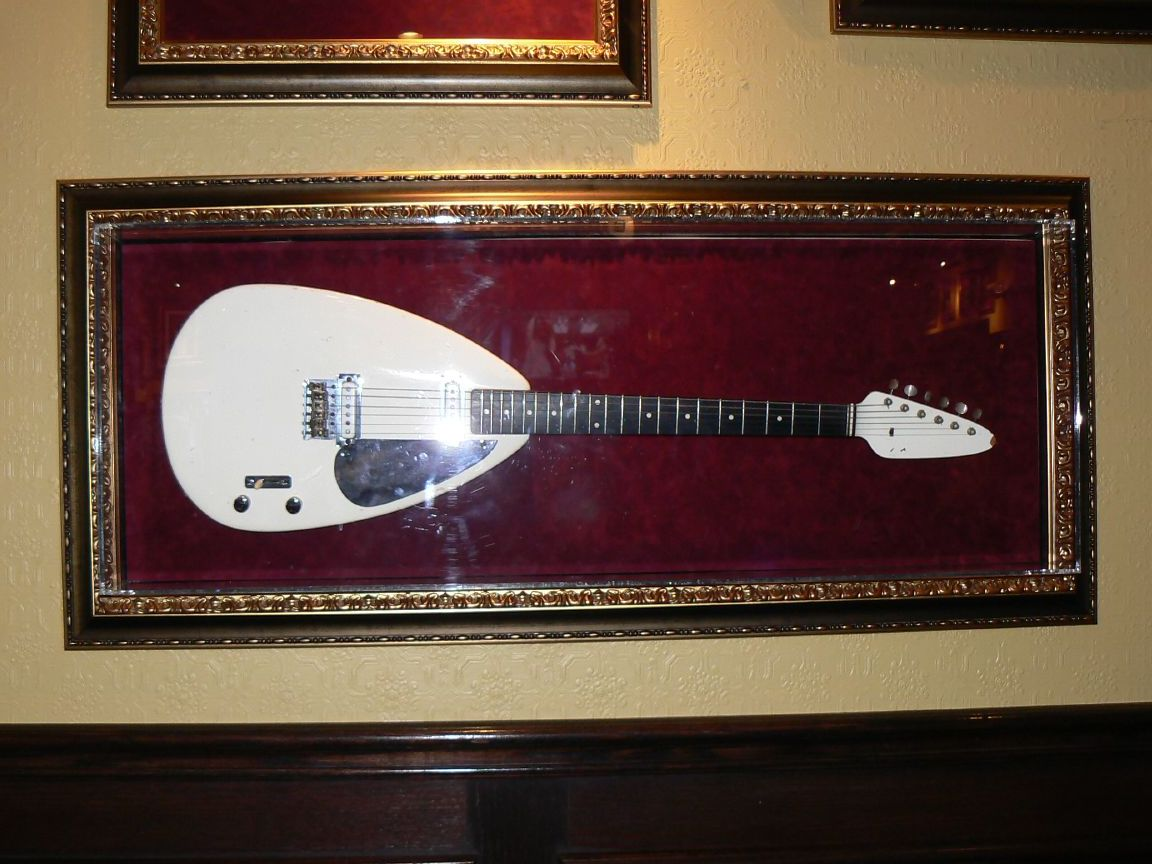
A Vox Teardrop guitar used by Brian Jones on display at Hard Rock Cafe in Sacramento, California

The writing of "The Last Time", the Rolling Stones' first major single, proved a turning point. The song was based on a traditional gospel song popularised by the Staple Singers, but the Rolling Stones' number features a distinctive guitar riff by Brian Jones. Prior to the emergence of Jagger/Richards as the Stones' songwriters, the band members occasionally were given collective credit under the pseudonym Nanker Phelge. Some songs attributed to Nanker Phelge have been re-attributed to Jagger/Richards.

Beginning with Jones and continuing with Wood, the Rolling Stones have developed what Richards refers to as the "ancient art of weaving" responsible for part of their sound—the interplay between two guitarists on stage. Unlike most bands, the Stones follow Richards' lead rather than the drummer's. Likewise, Watts was primarily a jazz player who was able to bring that genre's influences to the style of the band's drumming. The following of Richards' lead has led to conflicts between Jagger and Richards, and they have been known to annoy one another, but they have both agreed it makes for a better record; Watts in particular has praised Jagger's production skills. In the studio the band have tended to use a fluid personnel for recordings and not use the same players for each song. Guest pianists were commonplace on recordings; several songs on Beggars Banquet are driven by Nicky Hopkins' piano playing. On Exile on Main St., Richards plays bass on three tracks while Taylor plays on four.

Richards started using open tunings for rhythm parts (often in conjunction with a capo), most prominently an open-E or open-D tuning in 1968. Beginning in 1969, he often used 5-string open-G tuning (with the lower 6th string removed), as heard on the 1969 single "Honky Tonk Women", "Brown Sugar" (Sticky Fingers, 1971), "Tumbling Dice" (capo IV), "Happy" (capo IV), (Exile on Main St., 1972), and "Start Me Up" (Tattoo You, 1981). Steven Van Zandt writes "There are chord patterns that relate to his tunings — the 'Gimme Shelter' effect, let's call it — where you add a suspended note, and it becomes more melodic and rhythmic at the same time."

The feuds between Jagger and Richards originated in the 1970s, resulting in Jagger managing the band's affairs for many years. When Richards got himself off heroin and became more present in decision-making, Jagger was not used to it and did not like having his authority diminished. Of making albums with the Stones, Richards referred to it in 2023 as "controlled madness. Mick is the controller and I'm the madness."

Musical collaboration between members of the band and supporting musicians was key, due to the fluid line-ups typically experienced by the band in the studio, as tracks tended to be recorded "by whatever members of the group happened to be around at the time of the sessions". Over time, Jagger has developed into the template for rock frontmen and, with the help of the Stones, has, in the words of the Telegraph, "changed music" through his contributions to it as a pioneer of the modern music industry.

Stephen Hyden writes:

Starting out as a purist blues combo that fronted a bad-boy image while recording the occasional Lennon/McCartney pop tune and string-laden ballad to help secure their popularity, the Stones deftly moved through a number of guises in the ’60s and ’70s while remaining essentially the same band at its core. When arena-rock reigned, the Stones became an excessive live act whose decadence was on par with Led Zeppelin; when David Bowie and glam became the hippest thing in England, Mick Jagger lathered on the mascara and campy posturing. By the time of 1978’s Some Girls, the Stones absorbed the energy of New York City’s punk and disco scenes so completely that it reinvigorated the band’s career.

== Legacy ==
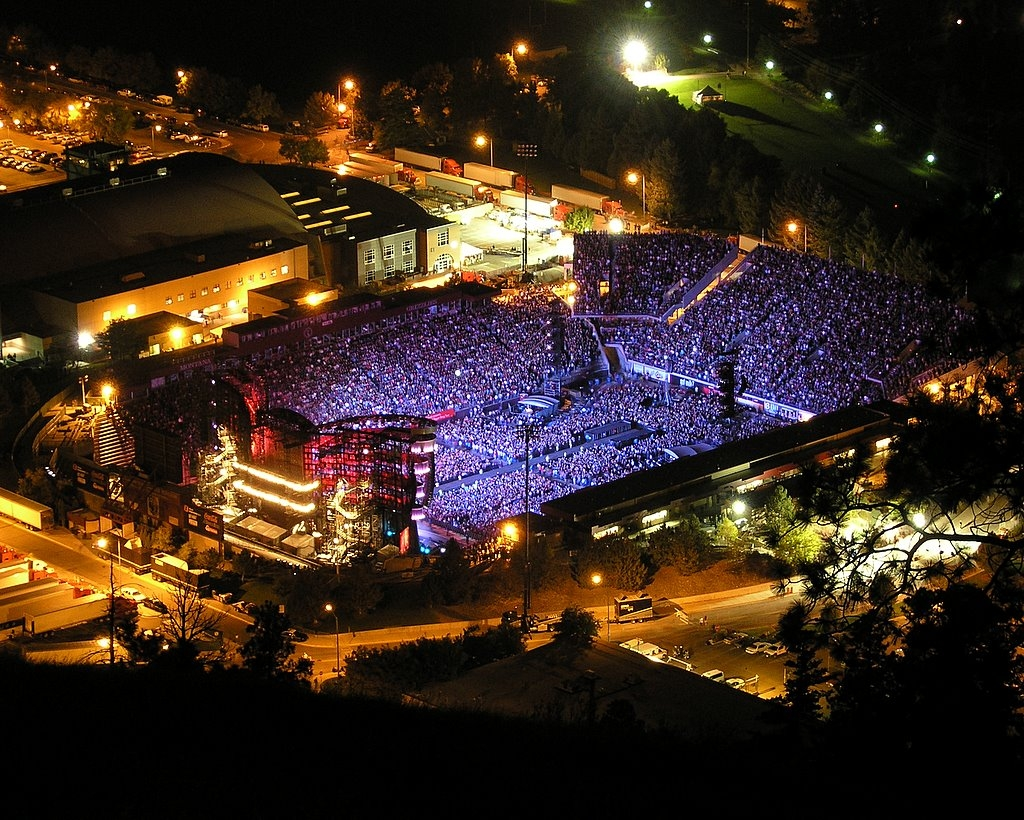
Aerial view of the Stones' concert at Washington–Grizzly Stadium in Missoula, Montana, in October 2006. On three separate tours, the Stones have set records for the highest-grossing concert tour.

"(I Can't Get No) Satisfaction" is regarded by many as "the classic example of rock and roll". The song ranked second on Rolling Stones's 500 Greatest Songs. The Stones contributed to the blues lexicon, creating their own "codewords", such as "losing streak" for menstrual period, which they have used throughout their catalogue of songs.

They pioneered the "raw, blues-based sound" that came to define hard rock and has been viewed as the musical "vanguard of a major transfusion" of various cultural attitudes, making them accessible to youth in Britain and the rest of the world. Muddy Waters said that the Rolling Stones and other English bands piqued the interest of American youth in blues musicians. After they came to the United States, sales of Waters' albums increased, thus helping to reconnect the country with its own music.

The Stones were supporters of the civil rights movement, with a contract clause stating that they would not perform in segregated venues. Breach of this clause would fine the promoter £30,100 and allow the band to walk away. Their support of civil rights causes has continued.

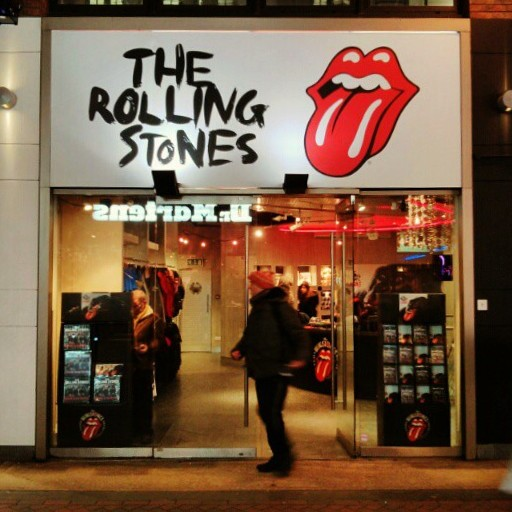
The Rolling Stones store on Carnaby Street in London in 2012. Merchandise has contributed to the band's record-breaking revenues.

The Stones were inducted into the Rock and Roll Hall of Fame by Pete Townshend in 1989. They have inspired and mentored new generations of artists both as a band and individually. The only artists to top the UK Album Charts in six different decades, they are tied for the second most number 1 albums on the Official UK Chart, surpassed only by the Beatles.

CNN called the Stones "far and away the most successful act in rock today", adding:

since 1989 alone, the band has generated more than $1.5 billion in gross revenues. That total includes sales of records, song rights, merchandising, sponsorship money, and touring. The Stones have made more money than U2, or Springsteen, or Michael Jackson, or Britney Spears, or the Who—or whoever. Sure, Mick attended the London School of Economics, but his greatest talent, besides strutting and singing, is his ability to surround himself and the rest of the band with a group of very able executives.

In a review of the band's acoustic rendition of "You Can't Always Get What You Want" for Global Citizen's One World: Together At Home on-line concert, Billboard stated that they are "still the masters of delivering unforgettable live performances." Rich Cohen of The Wall Street Journal wrote:

The Stones have gone through at least five stylistic iterations: cover band, '60s pop, '60s acid, '70s groove, '80s New Wave. At some point, they lost that elasticity and ability to reinvent—they got old—but the fact that they did it so well for so long explains their inexhaustible relevance. The Stones have lived and died and been reborn again and again. It means that, for many different generations of adults, the sound of high school was the Rolling Stones. The Stones have reinvented themselves so many times that they might as well be immortal.

Martin Scorsese has used Stones songs in the soundtracks of several films, including "Jumpin' Jack Flash" in Mean Streets (1973), "Monkey Man" in Goodfellas (1990) and "Can't You Hear Me Knocking" in Casino (1995). Other filmmakersrs have followed suit, including Francis Ford Coppola (“Satisfaction” in Apocalypse Now, 1979), Lawrence Kasdan (“You Can’t Always Get What You Want” in The Big Chill, 1983), Wes Anderson (“2000 Man” in Bottle Rocket, 1996, "I Am Waiting" in Rushmore, 1998, "Ruby Tuesday" in The Royal Tenenbaums, 2001) and Quentin Tarantino ("Out of Time" in Once Upon a Time in Hollywood, 2019). They have been the subject of documenaties, including Scorsese's Shine a Light (2008) and Brett Morgen's Crossfire Hurricane (2012).

The band have received three Grammy Awards and the Grammy Lifetime Achievement Award in 1986, and New Musical Express awards such as best live band. In November 2004, the Stones were among the inaugural inductees into the UK Music Hall of Fame. In 2019, Billboard ranked the Rolling Stones second on their list of the "Greatest Artists of All Time" based on their US chart success. In 2022, the band featured on a series of UK postage stamps issued by the Royal Mail and their 60th anniversary was commemorated with a collectible coin by the Royal Mint. The Stones have 38 top-10 albums in the US, the most of any artist. They have sold more than 250 million albums worldwide. In 1981, Rolling Stone wrote that the Stones "are the great rock & roll rhythm section of our time" and are "special primarily because they understand that a great rock & roll band never takes too much for granted."

They ranked fourth on the magazine's list of the Greatest Artists of All Time. Steven Van Zandt wrote

The Rolling Stones are my life. If it wasn't for them, I would have been a Soprano for real. I first saw the Stones on TV, on The Hollywood Palace in 1964. [...] The message was, "Maybe you can do this." The hair was sloppier. The harmonies were a bit off. And I don't remember them smiling at all. They had the R&B traditionalist's attitude: "We are not in show business. We are not pop music." And the sex in Mick Jagger's voice was adult. This wasn't pop sex – holding hands, playing spin the bottle. This was the real thing. Jagger had that conversational quality that came from R&B singers and bluesmen, that sort of half-singing, not quite holding notes. The acceptance of Jagger's voice on pop radio was a turning point in rock & roll. He broke open the door for everyone else. Suddenly, Eric Burdon and Van Morrison weren't so weird – even Bob Dylan.

== Live performances ==
Since their first concert on 12 July 1962 at the Marquee Club in London, the Rolling Stones have performed more than two thousand concerts around the world and have gone on over 48 tours of varying length, including three of the highest-grossing tours of all time: Bridges to Babylon, Voodoo Lounge, and A Bigger Bang.

From small clubs and hotels in London with little room for Jagger to move around to selling out stadiums worldwide, Rolling Stones tours have changed significantly over the decades. The Stones' early setups were simple compared to what they became later in the band's career, when elaborate stage designs, pyrotechnics, and giant screens were used. By the time the Stones toured America in 1969, they began to fill large halls and arenas, such as The Forum in Inglewood, California. They were also using more equipment, including lighting rigs and better sound equipment, than they had used in clubs.

The 1969 tour is considered a "great watershed tour" by Mick Jagger because they "started hanging the sound and therefore hanging the lights". Attributing the birth of arena rock to the Stones 1969 US tour, The Guardian ranked it 19 on their list of the 50 key events in rock music history. Before this tour the loudest sound at large-capacity shows was often the crowd, so the Stones used lighting and sound systems that ensured they could be seen and heard in the biggest arenas. The Guardian commented that their "combination of front-of-house excellence and behind-the-scenes savvy took the business of touring to an entirely new level." During the 1972 tour, the Stones developed a complex light show that included giant mirrors that bounced the light off them.

The Stones' concert runway at Prudential Center in Newark, New Jersey, in 2012; it first appeared in Stones' concerts in 1981.

During the 1975 Tour of the Americas, arena shows became an industry for the band, and the Stones hired a new lighting director, Jules Fisher. The props the band used on stage increased in both size and sophistication, similar to those on Broadway. They started to use multiple stages, from which they would select for a particular show. On this tour they had two versions of what Jagger referred to as the "lotus stage". One version had a large Venetian (cylindrical) curtain, and the other had leaves that began in a folded up position and opened during the beginning of the concert. This period also featured props, including inflatable penises and other gimmicks, and a number of circus tricks.

During the 1981–1982 American tour, the Stones worked with Japanese designer Kazuhide Yamazari in constructing their stages for stadium-sized locations and audiences. During this period, stages increased in size to include runways and movable sections of the stage going out into the audience. This tour used coloured panels and was one of the last Stones tours to do so before switching to devices such as video screens. Stadium shows provided a new challenge for the band.

When you're out there in this vast stadium, you have to physically tiny up on stage, so that's why on the 1981-2 tour we had those coloured panels and later we started using devices like video screens. We became very aware of not being seen, of just being there like ants. Mick is the one who really has to project himself over the footlights. And when the show gets that big, you need a little extra help, you need a couple of gimmicks, as we call it, in the show. You need fireworks, you need lights, you need a bit of theatre.

— Charlie Watts, According to the Rolling Stones

Over time, their props and stage equipment have become increasingly sophisticated. When the Stones began to fill stadium-sized venues, they ran into the problem of the audience no longer being able to see them. This was particularly the case when they performed a free concert for an estimated 1.5 million people in Rio de Janeiro on the A Bigger Bang tour in 2006. The show required over 500 lights, hundreds of speakers, and a video screen almost thirteen metres (43 ft) in length. Due to the 2.5 km (1.6 mi) length of the beach on which the Stones performed, sound systems had to be set up in a relay pattern down the beach, to keep the sound in sync with the music from the stage.

== Band members ==
Current members

- Mick Jagger – lead vocals, harmonica, percussion, rhythm guitar, keyboards (1962–present)
- Keith Richards – rhythm and lead guitars, backing and lead vocals, bass guitar, keyboards (1962–present)
- Ronnie Wood – lead and rhythm guitars, slide guitar, pedal steel guitar, bass guitar, backing vocals (1975–present)

Former members

- Brian Jones – lead and rhythm guitars, slide guitar, harmonica, keyboards, percussion, dulcimer, sitar, woodwinds, backing vocals (1962–1969; died 1969)
- Ian Stewart – keyboards, percussion (1962–1963; touring/session musician and road manager 1963–1985; his death)
- Bill Wyman – bass guitar, backing vocals (1962–1993; guest 2011, 2012, 2023)
- Charlie Watts – drums, percussion (1963–2021; his death)
- Mick Taylor – lead and rhythm guitars, slide guitar, bass guitar, backing vocals (1969–1974; guest 2012–2014)

== Discography ==
The Rolling Stones have released 32 studio albums, 12 contemporary live albums, 27 archival live albums, and 28 compilation albums.

Studio albums

- The Rolling Stones (1964, UK)
- England's Newest Hit Makers (1964, US)
- 12 X 5 (1964, US)
- The Rolling Stones No. 2 (1965, UK)
- The Rolling Stones, Now! (1965, US)
- Out of Our Heads (1965, UK and US versions different)
- December's Children (And Everybody's) (1965, US)
- Aftermath (1966, UK and US versions different)
- Between the Buttons (1967, UK and US versions different)
- Their Satanic Majesties Request (1967)
- Beggars Banquet (1968)
- Let It Bleed (1969)
- Sticky Fingers (1971)
- Exile on Main St. (1972)
- Goats Head Soup (1973)
- It's Only Rock 'n Roll (1974)
- Black and Blue (1976)
- Some Girls (1978)
- Emotional Rescue (1980)
- Tattoo You (1981)
- Undercover (1983)
- Dirty Work (1986)
- Steel Wheels (1989)
- Voodoo Lounge (1994)
- Bridges to Babylon (1997)
- A Bigger Bang (2005)
- Blue & Lonesome (2016)
- Hackney Diamonds (2023)
- Foreign Tongues (2026)
