= Exile on Main St. (Pussy Galore album) =

- One of unofficial CD re-releases

Studio album of cover songs by Pussy Galore
- Released: December 1986
- Recorded: August 24–August 26, 1986
- Studio: Pussy Galore Mobile Unit
- Genre: Noise rock, punk blues
- Length: 59:55
- Label: Shove
- Producer: Pussy Galore

Pussy Galore chronology
Groovy Hate Fuck (1986)	Exile on Main St. (1986)	1 Yr Live (1986)

Exile on Main St. is an album by American noise rock band Pussy Galore, released in December 1986 by Shove Records. It is a track-by-track cover album re-interpreting the Rolling Stones' 1972 album Exile on Main St. Its only official release format was the cassette tape, in a limited run of only 550 hand-numbered copies.

== Background ==
While Pussy Galore's version is an intentionally deconstructionist approach to remaking the original album, most of the songs on the album remain recognizable and reconcilable to their original versions. One notable exception is Pussy Galore's performance of "Shine A Light", which, while itself an actual recording of that song, was purposefully distorted essentially beyond recognition. On a bootleg which circulates among fans, titled "Exile On Main Street (Unmixed Version)" or simply "Exile Unmixed", many performances that were purposefully obscured on the official release are clearly audible and it seems that the group did make somewhat of a sincere attempt to learn all eighteen songs from the original LP.

In addition to the general chaos, purposeful distortion, and incomprehensible mixing and editing, the record also contains bits of dialog from the band members arguing and yelling at one another, as well as some original Rolling Stones versions of tracks from "Exile..." bleeding through the mix at points. One notable appearance comes from what appears to be a copy of The Velvet Underground's song "Heroin", though it sounds as if it is skipping on a damaged vinyl record.

== Reception ==
Professional ratings
Review scores
Source	Rating
AllMusic	3.5/5 stars

NME ranked the album number 253 in "The 500 Greatest Albums of All Time" in October 2013. David Browne called the album "the symbolic passing of the irreverent torch."

== Track listing ==
All tracks are written by Mick Jagger and Keith Richards, except where noted.

Side one
No.	Title	Writer(s)	Length
1.	"Rocks Off"		4:21
2.	"Rip This Joint"		1:38
3.	"Hip Shake"	Slim Harpo	3:37
4.	"Casino Boogie"		2:41
5.	"Tumbling Dice"		4:16
6.	"Sweet Virginia"		2:44
7.	"Torn and Frayed"		3:08
8.	"Sweet Black Angel"		2:46
9.	"Loving Cup"		3:16

Side two
No.	Title	Writer(s)	Length
1.	"Happy"		2:27
2.	"Turd on the Run"		2:05
3.	"Ventilator Blues"	Mick Jagger, Keith Richards, Mick Taylor	3:57
4.	"I Just Want to See His Face"		3:56
5.	"Let It Loose"		3:59
6.	"All Down the Line"		3:22
7.	"Stop Breaking Down"	Robert Johnson	2:39
8.	"Shine a Light"		5:24
9.	"Soul Survivor"		3:38

== Personnel ==
Adapted from the Exile on Main St liner notes.

Pussy Galore

- Bob Bert – drums, percussion, vocals
- Julie Cafritz – electric guitar, vocals
- Neil Hagerty – electric guitar, violin, percussion, vocals, mixing
- Cristina Martinez – electric guitar, vocals
- Jon Spencer – lead vocals, electric guitar, percussion, mixing

Production

- Rick Hall – mixing, cover art
- Pussy Galore – production

== Release history ==
Region	Date	Label	Format	Catalog
United States	1986	Shove	CS	SHOV 3
United States	1992	Shove	LP	SHOV 3
United States	1997	Shove	CD	SHOV 3
