= The Rolling Stones American Tour 1972 =

1972 concert tour by the Rolling Stones

- Continental tour by the Rolling Stones
- Location: North America
- Associated album: Exile on Main St.
- Start date: 3 June 1972
- End date: 26 July 1972
- Legs: 1
- No. of shows: 48

the Rolling Stones concert chronology
- UK Tour 1971; American Tour 1972; Pacific Tour 1973

The Rolling Stones American Tour 1972, also known as the "Stones Touring Party", shortened to S.T.P., was a much-publicized and much-written-about concert tour of the United States and Canada in June and July 1972 by the Rolling Stones. Constituting the band's first performances in the United States following the Altamont Free Concert in December 1969, critic Dave Marsh would later write that the tour was "part of rock and roll legend" and one of the "benchmarks of an era."

== Tour and difficulties ==
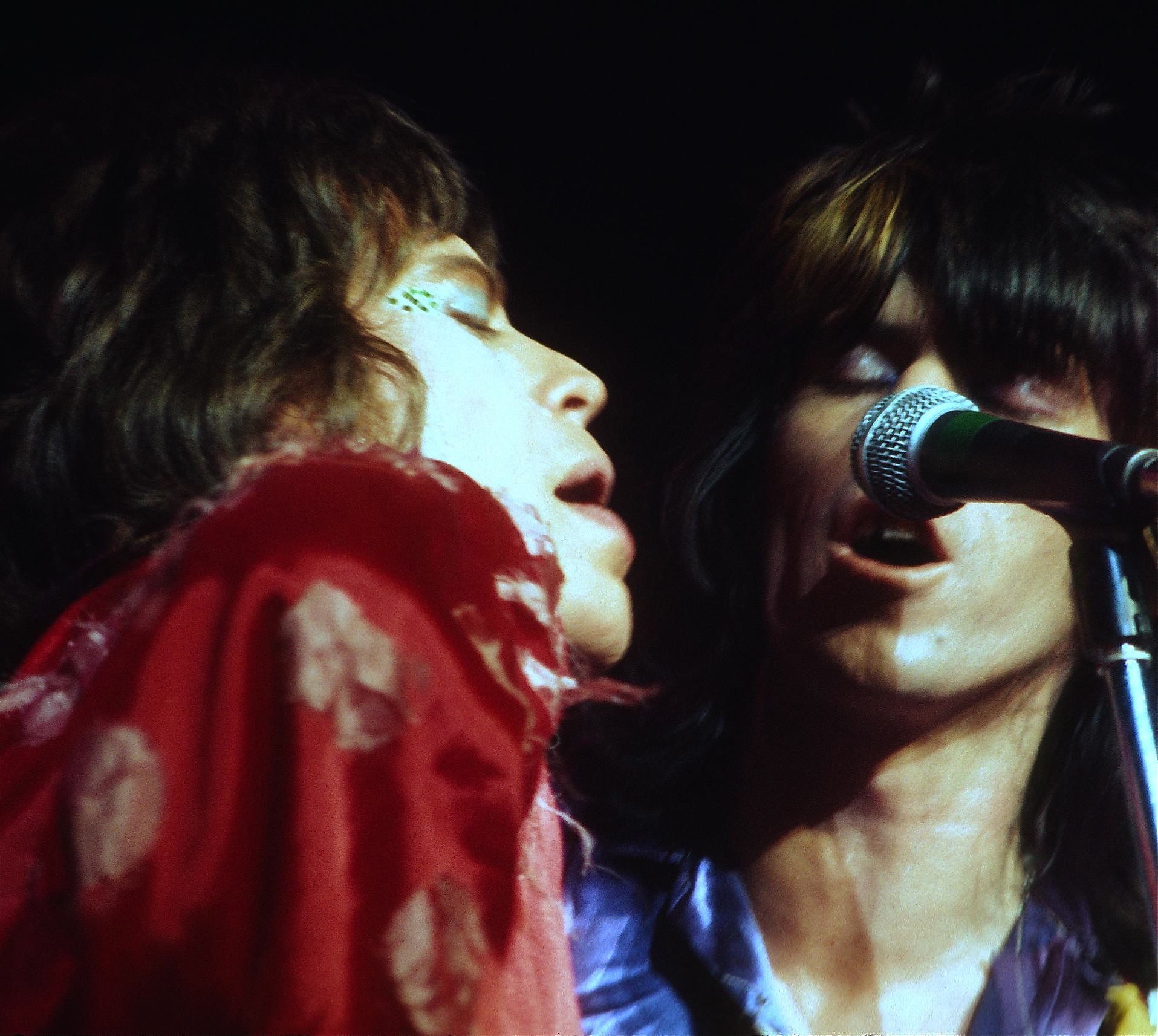
Mick Jagger and Keith Richards share a microphone during the June 1972 Winterland shows

The tour in part supported the group's Exile on Main St. album, which had been released on 12 May, a few weeks before the tour began. It was also part of a triennial pattern of touring America that the group maintained from 1969 through 1981.

On the first show of the tour, 3 June in Vancouver, British Columbia, 31 policemen were treated for injuries when more than 2,000 fans attempted to crash the Pacific Coliseum.

In San Diego on 13 June, there were 60 arrests and 15 people injured during disturbances. In Tucson, Arizona, on 14 June, an attempt by 300 youths to storm the gates led to police using tear gas. On 16 June, after the Denver shows, in a hotel suite, Stephen Stills and Keith Richards drew knives in an argument. While in Chicago for three appearances on 19 and 20 June, the group stayed at Hugh Hefner's original Playboy Mansion in the Gold Coast district. Eighty-one people were arrested at the two sellout Houston shows on 25 June, mostly for marijuana possession and other minor drug offences. There were 61 arrests in the large crowd at RFK Stadium in Washington, D.C., on the Fourth of July.

On 13 July police had to block 2,000 ticket-less fans from trying to gain access to the show in Detroit. On 17 July at the Montreal Forum a bomb blew up in the Stones' equipment van, and replacement gear had to be flown in; then it was discovered that 3,000 forged tickets had been sold; fans rioted and there was a late start to the concert. The next day, 18 July, the Stones' entourage got into a fight with photographer Andy Dickerman in Rhode Island, and Jagger and Richards landed in jail, imperiling that night's show at the Boston Garden. Boston Mayor Kevin White, fearful of a riot if the show were to be cancelled, intervened to bail the musicians out; the show went on, albeit with another late start. Dickerman would later file a £22,230 lawsuit against the band.

The tour ended with four shows over three consecutive nights at New York City's Madison Square Garden, the first night of which saw 10 arrests and two policemen injured, and the last leading to confrontations between the crowd outside Madison Square Garden and the police. The last show on 26 July, Jagger's 29th birthday, had balloons and confetti falling from Madison Square Garden's ceiling and Jagger blowing the candles off a huge cake. Pies were also wheeled in, leading to a pie fight between the Rolling Stones and the audience.

Following the final performance, a party was held in Jagger's honor by Ahmet Ertegun at the St. Regis New York. Guests included Bob Dylan, Woody Allen, Andy Warhol, the Capote entourage, and Zsa Zsa Gabor, while the Count Basie Orchestra provided musical entertainment. At the event, Dylan characterized the tour as "encompassing" and "the beginning of cosmic consciousness."

Rock critic Robert Christgau reported that the mood of the shows was friendly, with Jagger "undercut[ting] his fabled demonism by playing the clown, the village idiot, the marionette."

== Naming ==
The official name of the tour was 'American Tour 1972'. The tour is also known as the "Stones Touring Party", shortened to S.T.P., derived from the laminates handed out by the management to crew, family, friends and press, granting access to the various areas at the concert venues and hotels. In 2015 Jose Cuervo in association with the Rolling Stones launched a brand of tequila with a marketing campaign based on one of the nicknames of the American Tour being the "Cocaine and Tequila Sunrise tour".

== Coverage ==
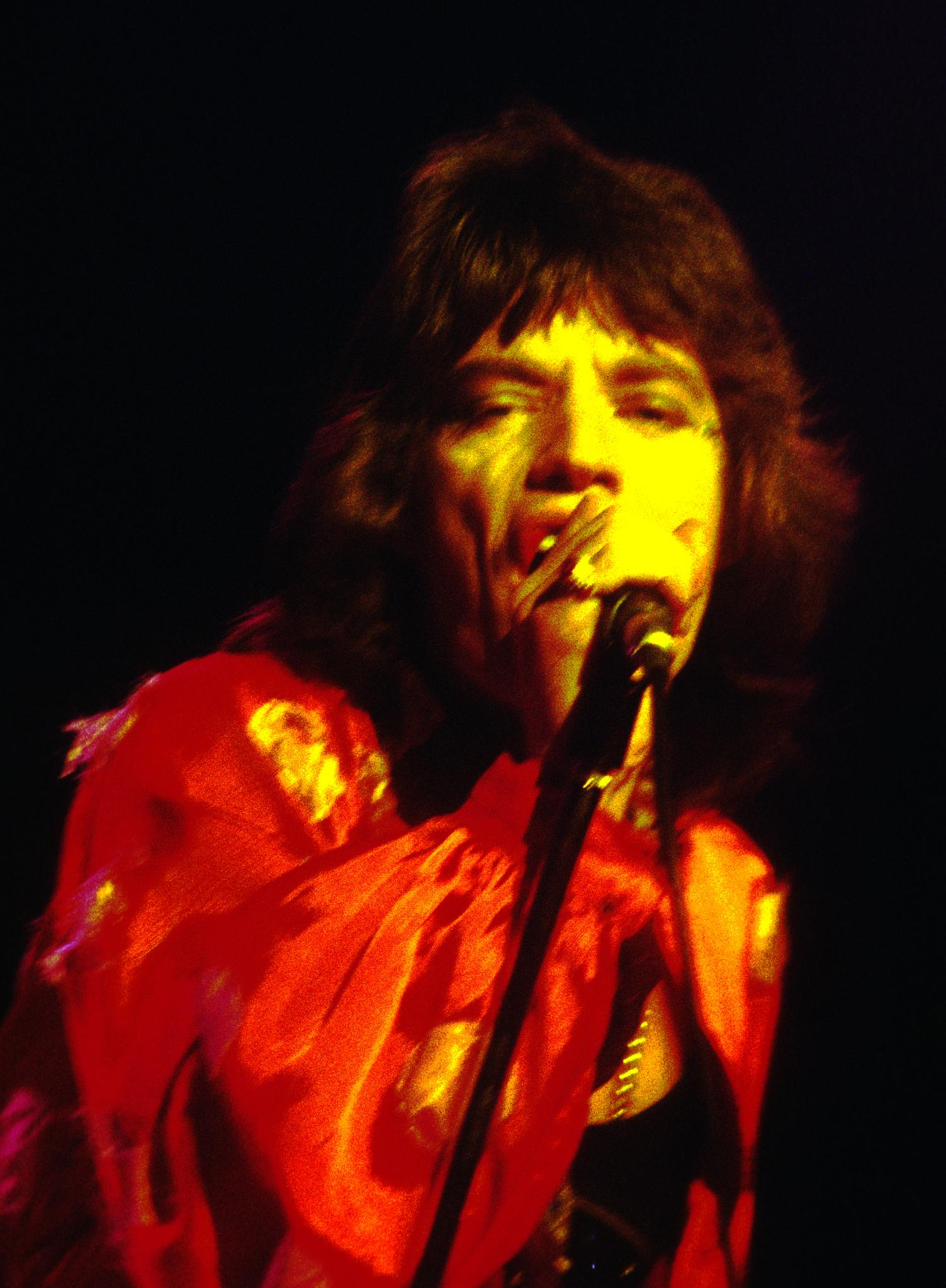
Mick Jagger at Winterland Ballroom, June 1972

Several writers were assigned to cover the tour. Truman Capote was commissioned to write a travelogue for Rolling Stone. Accompanied by prominent New York socialites Lee Radziwill and Peter Beard, Capote did not mesh well with the group; he and his entourage abandoned the tour in New Orleans, before resurfacing for the final shows at Madison Square Garden. Having struggled with writer's block since the publication of In Cold Blood in 1966, he failed to complete his feature, tentatively titled "It Will Soon Be Here." Rolling Stone ultimately recouped its stake by assigning Andy Warhol to interview Capote about the tour in 1973. In the interview, Capote alleged that tour doctor Laurence Badgley (a 1968 graduate of the Yale School of Medicine who was later retained by Led Zeppelin for their 1977 North American tour) had a "super-Lolita complex" and initiated the statutory rape of a high school student (also filmed by Robert Frank) on the band's business jet during a flight to Washington, D.C.

Terry Southern, a close friend of Keith Richards since the late 1960s, wrote about the tour for Saturday Review in what proved to be one of his last major journalistic assignments. Southern and Beard developed a friendship on the tour and collaborated intermittently on The End of the Game (an unfilmed screenplay) for over two decades.

Robert Greenfield's S.T.P.: A Journey Through America with the Rolling Stones (derived from his tour reportage for Rolling Stone) was published in 1974. Greenfield had already covered the band's 1971 British Tour for Rolling Stone and was granted unlimited access to the band's affairs. Although Greenfield was initially assigned as the magazine's sole correspondent for the tour before a last-minute deal was reached with Capote, he was permitted to continue in his assignment, paralleling Hunter S. Thompson and Timothy Crouse's two-pronged coverage of the contemporaneous 1972 United States presidential election for the magazine.

Dick Cavett hosted a one-hour special shot before the concluding New York engagement of performances. Capote appeared on The Tonight Show Starring Johnny Carson and several other talk shows, talking about his experiences on the tour. New York radio host Alex Bennett reported on the first Madison Square Garden show as soon as he got back from it.

== Filming ==
No live album was released from the tour at the time, although one was planned as far as having a front and back cover designed and studio touch-ups being made on several recorded tracks. Eventually, the album was shelved due to contractual disputes with Allen Klein.

Two films of the tour were produced. The concert film Ladies and Gentlemen: The Rolling Stones! only saw a limited theatrical release in 1974. Aside from an Australian VHS release in the early 1980s, it was not officially available on home video until 2010. The film's complete soundtrack was released as an album by Eagle Records/Universal in 2017.

Robert Frank's Cocksucker Blues is a documentary shot in cinéma vérité style; several cameras were available for anyone in the entourage to pick up and start shooting backstage parties, drug use, and roadie and groupie antics, including a groupie in a hotel room injecting heroin. The film came under a court order which forbade it from being shown other than in very restricted circumstances. The film has since surfaced online in various bootlegged versions of varying quality.

== Personnel ==
=== The Rolling Stones ===
- Mick Jagger — vocals, harmonica
- Keith Richards — guitar, vocals
- Mick Taylor — guitar
- Bill Wyman — bass
- Charlie Watts — drums

=== Additional musicians ===
- Nicky Hopkins — piano
- Bobby Keys — saxophone
- Jim Price — trumpet, trombone
- Ian Stewart — piano on "Bye Bye Johnny" (sometimes played by Nicky Hopkins), "Brown Sugar" and "Honky Tonk Women"

== Tour support acts ==
Stevie Wonder was the support act for the tour. Having released his groundbreaking Music of My Mind album in March 1972, Wonder would go on to release another epochal album (Talking Book) by year's end. This placement, along with his hard-edged hit "Superstition" (released in October 1972), did much to increase Wonder's visibility to rock audiences. He and his band would also sometimes join the Stones at the end of the group's performance for an encore medley of Wonder's 1966 hit "Uptight (Everything's Alright)" and "(I Can't Get No) Satisfaction".

== Tour set list ==
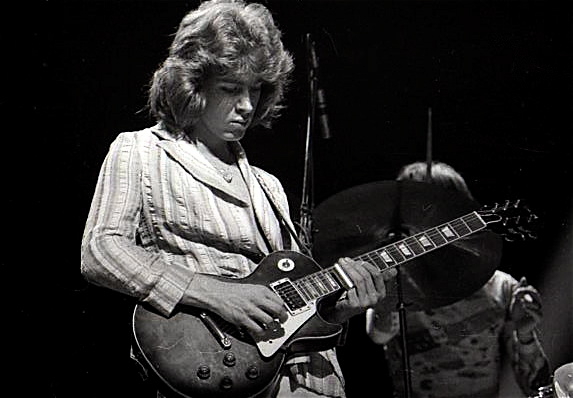
Taylor playing slide guitar with the Rolling Stones at Madison Square Garden, 1972

The standard set list for the tour was:

1. "Brown Sugar"
2. "Bitch"
3. "Rocks Off"
4. "Gimme Shelter"
5. "Happy"
6. "Tumbling Dice"
7. "Love in Vain"
8. "Sweet Virginia"
9. "You Can't Always Get What You Want"
10. "All Down the Line"
11. "Midnight Rambler"
12. "Bye Bye Johnny"
13. "Rip This Joint"
14. "Jumpin' Jack Flash"
15. "Street Fighting Man"
16. Encore: often none, sometimes "Honky Tonk Women", a few times "Uptight (Everything's Alright)" / "(I Can't Get No) Satisfaction"

Additional songs performed:

- "Loving Cup" (Vancouver, 3 June; both shows in Seattle, 4 June; Winterland in San Francisco, 8 June, second show)
- "Ventilator Blues" (only on opening night in Vancouver, 3 June)
- "Torn and Frayed" (only on opening night in Vancouver, 3 June)
- "Dead Flowers" (only in Fort Worth, 24 June, first show)
- "Sweet Black Angel" (only in Fort Worth, 24 June, first show)
- "Don't You Lie to Me" (only in Fort Worth, 24 June, second show)

The exact number of setlist variations are subject to ongoing research. Notably absent was anything from before 1968 in the Stones' catalog save for the occasional presence of "(I Can't Get No) Satisfaction". This tour also marked the banishment of "Sympathy for the Devil", which had been wrongly associated with the killing at Altamont, from the band's American performances for much of the 1970s.

The tour grossed a then-record of $4 million (US$30,787,589 in 2025 dollars). Although each band member netted roughly $250,000 (equivalent to $1.4 million today), Jagger was dissatisfied when he learned that Led Zeppelin manager Peter Grant had secured a then-unprecedented 90/10 split of gross receipts in the group's favor on its contemporaneous North American tour.

== Tour dates ==
Date	City	Country	Venue	Opening act(s)
3 June 1972	Vancouver	Canada	Pacific Coliseum	Stevie Wonder
4 June 1972; 2 shows	Seattle	United States	Seattle Center Coliseum	Stevie Wonder
6 June 1972; 2 shows	San Francisco	United States	Winterland Ballroom	Stevie Wonder
8 June 1972; 2 shows	San Francisco	United States	Winterland Ballroom	Stevie Wonder
9 June 1972	Los Angeles	United States	Hollywood Palladium	Stevie Wonder
10 June 1972	Long Beach	United States	Long Beach Arena	Stevie Wonder
11 June 1972; 2 shows	Inglewood	United States	The Forum	Stevie Wonder
13 June 1972	San Diego	United States	International Sports Arena	Stevie Wonder
14 June 1972	Tucson	United States	Tucson Convention Center	Stevie Wonder
15 June 1972	Albuquerque	United States	University Arena	Stevie Wonder
16 June 1972; 2 shows	Denver	United States	Denver Coliseum	Stevie Wonder
18 June 1972	Bloomington	United States	Metropolitan Sports Center	Stevie Wonder
19 June 1972	Chicago	United States	International Amphitheatre	Stevie Wonder
20 June 1972; 2 shows	Chicago	United States	International Amphitheatre	Stevie Wonder
22 June 1972	Kansas City	United States	Municipal Auditorium	Stevie Wonder
24 June 1972; 2 shows	Fort Worth	United States	Tarrant County Convention Center	Stevie Wonder
25 June 1972; 2 shows	Houston	United States	Hofheinz Pavilion	Stevie Wonder
27 June 1972	Mobile	United States	Mobile Civic Center	Stevie Wonder
28 June 1972	Tuscaloosa	United States	Memorial Coliseum	Stevie Wonder
29 June 1972	Nashville	United States	Municipal Auditorium	Stevie Wonder
4 July 1972	Washington, D.C.	United States	Robert F. Kennedy Memorial Stadium	Stevie Wonder
5 July 1972	Norfolk	United States	Norfolk Scope	Stevie Wonder
6 July 1972	Charlotte	United States	Charlotte Coliseum	Stevie Wonder
7 July 1972	Knoxville	United States	Civic Arena	Stevie Wonder
9 July 1972; 2 shows	St. Louis	United States	Kiel Convention Hall	Stevie Wonder
11 July 1972	Akron	United States	Rubber Bowl	Stevie Wonder
12 July 1972	Indianapolis	United States	Indiana Convention-Exposition Center	Stevie Wonder
13 July 1972	Detroit	United States	Cobo Hall	Stevie Wonder
14 July 1972	Detroit	United States	Cobo Hall	Stevie Wonder
15 July 1972; 2 shows	Toronto	Canada	Maple Leaf Gardens	Stevie Wonder
17 July 1972	Montreal	Canada	Montreal Forum	Stevie Wonder
18 July 1972	Boston	United States	Boston Garden	Stevie Wonder
19 July 1972	Boston	United States	Boston Garden	Stevie Wonder
20 July 1972	Philadelphia	United States	The Spectrum	Stevie Wonder
21 July 1972; 2 shows	Philadelphia	United States	The Spectrum	Stevie Wonder
22 July 1972	Pittsburgh	United States	Civic Arena	Stevie Wonder
24 July 1972	New York City	United States	Madison Square Garden	Stevie Wonder
25 July 1972; 2 shows	New York City	United States	Madison Square Garden	Stevie Wonder
26 July 1972	New York City	United States	Madison Square Garden	Stevie Wonder

== Bibliography ==
- Greenfield, Robert. S.T.P.: A Journey Through America With The Rolling Stones. Reissued Da Capo Press, 2002. ISBN 0-306-81199-5
- Carr, Roy. The Rolling Stones: An Illustrated Record. Harmony Books, 1976. ISBN 0-517-52641-7
