= Phish 3D =

- Theatrical poster
- Starring: Trey Anastasio; Jon Fishman; Mike Gordon; Page McConnell
- Edited by: Don Wilson
- Production companies: AEG Live; Action 3D Productions
- Distributed by: Cinedigm
- Release date: April 20, 2010
- Running time: 140 minutes
- Country: United States
- Language: English

Phish 3D is a 2010 concert film in 3D featuring the rock band Phish. It was filmed at Phish's Festival 8, a three-day, eight-set, 16-hour concert performed in October 2009 at the Empire Polo Field in Indio, California. The film opened with a sneak preview on April 20, 2010, followed by a limited one week engagement which began on April 30, 2010. The movie was produced by Action 3D Productions in association with Network Live and Cinedigm Digital Cinema Corp.

Containing songs exclusive to the film, Phish 3D features footage of the festival, viewed by over 40,000 fans, and of the band backstage and in rehearsals. It also shows a costumed performance of the full Rolling Stones album Exile on Main St. Phish 3D features songs from the band's first ever full-length acoustic set, as well as performances taken from the six additional sets.

== Songs ==
Phish 3D includes complete performances of the following songs:

- "AC/DC Bag"
- "Undermind"
- "Stealing Time from the Faulty Plan"
- "Tweezer"
- "Maze"
- "Mike's Song"
- Interlude: fans on Sunday morning with "Mountains in the Mist" as background music
- "Back on the Train" *
- "Strange Design" *
- "The Curtain With" *
- "Sleep Again" *
- "Train Song" *
- "Wilson" *
- Interlude: "Suzy Greenberg" rehearsal
- "Loving Cup" **
- "Happy" **
- "Shine a Light" **
- "Soul Survivor" **
- "Suzy Greenberg"
- "Tweezer Reprise"
- Closing titles: Exile on Main St. rehearsal

*acoustic performance
**from Exile on Main St.
