= Amazing Grace (2018 film) =

2018 American documentary film featuring Aretha Franklin

- Theatrical release poster
- Directed by: Alan Elliott ("realized by"); Sydney Pollack (uncredited)
- Produced by: Alan Elliot; Spike Lee; Joe Boyd; Aretha Franklin; Rob Johnson; Chiemi Karasawa; Sabrina V. Owens; Jerry Wexler; Tirrell D. Whittley; Joseph Woolf
- Starring: Aretha Franklin; James Cleveland; Alexander Hamilton; The Southern California Community Choir
- Edited by: Jeff Buchanan
- Production companies: Al's Records & Tapes
- Distributed by: Neon; Time
- Release dates: November 12, 2018 (Doc NYC); April 5, 2019 (general)
- Running time: 87 minutes
- Country: United States
- Language: English
- Box office: $10.4 million

Amazing Grace is a 2018 concert film "realized and produced" by Alan Elliott. The film's footage was shot under the direction of Sydney Pollack, who does not receive directorial credit, just a "special thanks." Amazing Grace stars Aretha Franklin recording her 1972 live album of the same name. It co-stars James Cleveland, Alexander Hamilton, and the Southern California Community Choir, and features her father C. L. Franklin.

The film was not released as scheduled in 1972 due to difficulty in synchronizing the audio with the visual print, and was relegated to a Warner Bros. vault until 2007, when producer Alan Elliott purchased the raw footage and attempted to synchronize it. The edited footage, 87 minutes in length, was planned for a 2011 release. However, Franklin sued Elliott for appropriating her likeness without permission, and the release date passed. Elliott made another attempt in 2015 to hold the film's premiere at the Telluride Film Festival, at the Toronto International Film Festival, and at the Chicago International Film Festival, but Franklin sued him again for reasons that have not been revealed. After Franklin's death in 2018, her family made an arrangement to release the film, which premiered at Doc NYC in 2018, before being released worldwide on April 5, 2019. The film has received critical acclaim.

== Synopsis ==
American singer Aretha Franklin records her gospel album Amazing Grace live at the New Temple Missionary Baptist Church in Los Angeles in 1972. She is accompanied by the Southern California Community Choir, directed by Alexander Hamilton, positioned behind her as Franklin sings from the church's lectern or from the piano to a mostly African-American audience. James Cleveland appears as master of ceremonies, featured singer and piano accompanist. Franklin is also accompanied by Kenny Luper on organ, Cornell Dupree on guitar, Bernard Purdie on drums, Chuck Rainey on bass guitar and Poncho Moralaes on percussion. On the second night, Mick Jagger and Charlie Watts appear in the audience, in Los Angeles at the time to finish the Rolling Stones' album Exile on Main St. Critic Jordan Hoffman believes the gospel inflections of songs such as "Shine a Light" and "Let It Loose" were inspired by this visit.

== Cast ==
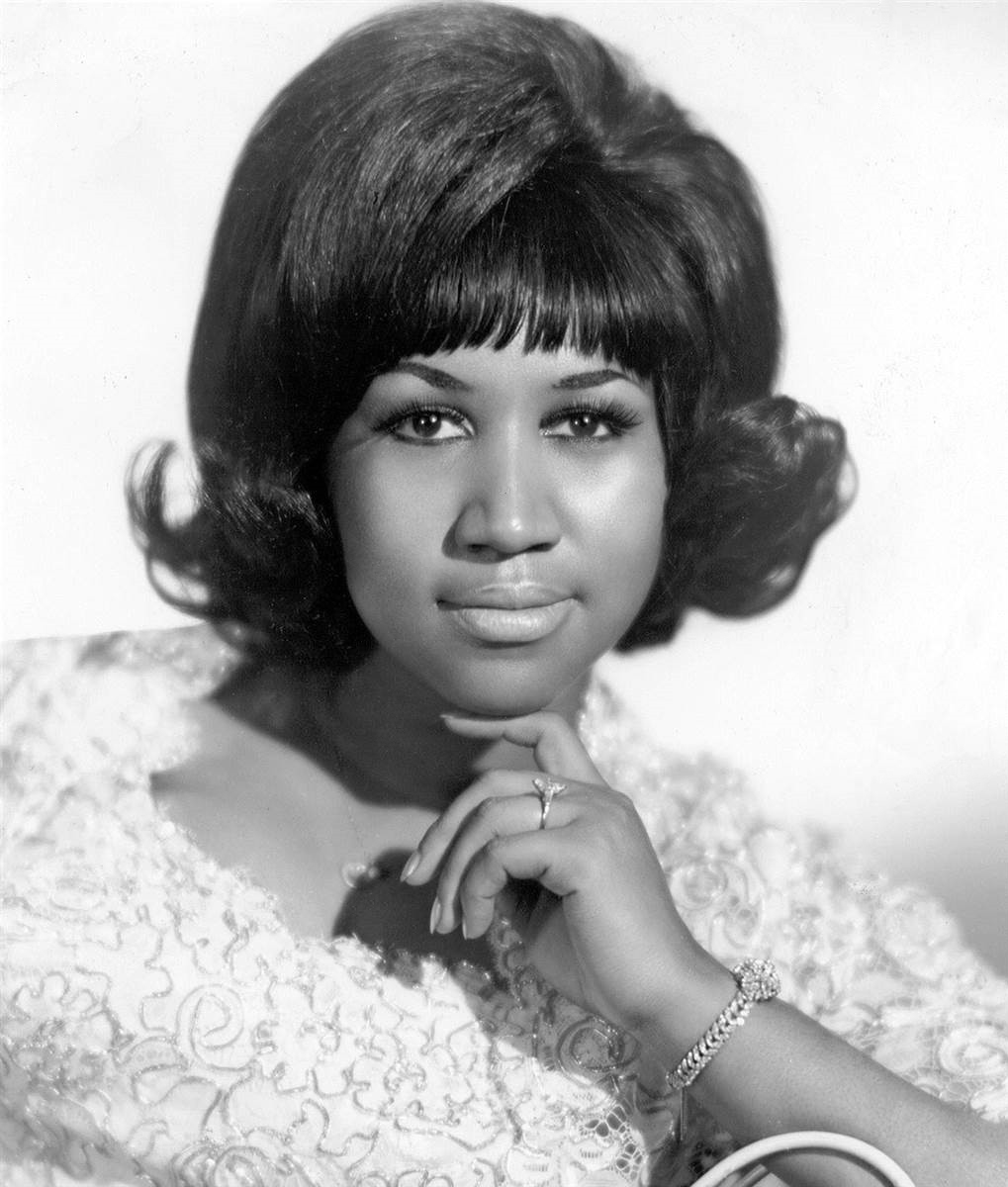
Franklin in 1968

- Aretha Franklin - vocals, piano
- James Cleveland - MC, vocals, piano
- Alexander Hamilton - choir director
- Cornell Dupree - guitar
- Kenny Luper - organ
- Poncho Morales - percussion
- Bernard Purdie - drums
- Chuck Rainey - bass
- Southern California Community Choir

Also appearing:

- C. L. Franklin - speaker (Aretha Franklin's father)
- Sydney Pollack - original director of film
- Clara Ward - in audience
- Mick Jagger - in audience
- Charlie Watts - in audience

== Production ==
In 1972, Joe Boyd, the Music Services director at Warner Bros., originally proposed that film director James Signorelli direct the film. At a later date, Warner CEO Ted Ashley approached Sydney Pollack to direct the film. Pollack accepted the assignment when he heard Franklin's name.

Principal photography took place over two consecutive nights, on January 13 and 14, 1972, at the New Temple Missionary Baptist Church in Los Angeles, while Franklin recorded her Amazing Grace album. The album went on to become the highest-selling gospel music album of all time. Pollack shot 20 hours of raw footage using 16 mm cameras.

The post-production and supervision of the film were completed by Final Cut USA, Inc. Since Pollack had not used clapperboards, it was considered impossible to sync the audio with the film in post-production. The project was halted, and the raw footage placed in a vault at Warner Bros; it went unseen through the 1990s.

== Release ==
The Amazing Grace film was initially scheduled for a 1972 release together with Warner Bros.' Super Fly. In 2007, producer Alan Elliott purchased the raw footage. Subsequently, sound editor/mixer Serge Perron successfully synchronized the sound with all the film footage. Once all the sound and footage were synchronized, Jeff Buchanan edited the film. Now pared down to 87 minutes, the film was scheduled for a 2011 release. However, Franklin sued Elliott for appropriating her likeness without permission, and the release was postponed.

After Franklin's original release contract was discovered at the Warner Bros. offices, Elliott decided to release the film at the Telluride Film Festival, the Toronto International Film Festival, and the Chicago International Film Festival in 2015. Franklin sued him again, this time for reasons that have not been published, and was granted an emergency injunction against the film screening, because she had not given permission to screen the footage. After Franklin's death in 2018, her family made an arrangement to release the film. It premiered at the Doc NYC on November 12, 2018, was released worldwide on April 5, 2019, and had its UK premiere on May 10. 2019. An expanded version of the film was developed with Neon and was scheduled to have a theatrical release in March 2020.

=== Home media ===
Amazing Grace was released in the United States on digital download and DVD on August 6, 2019, by Universal Studios. In the UK, StudioCanal released the film on DVD, digital and Blu-ray on September 2, 2019. The film debuted at No. 2 on the U.S. Billboard Music Video Sales chart on August 17, 2019. The following week it reached No. 1 replacing Live from the Artists Den by Soundgarden, based on sales of DVDs and other formats. The film debuted at No. 1 on the UK Official Music Video Chart (OCC). Amazing Grace grossed $705,618 on Domestic DVD Sales, with 30,800 units sold.

On 3 October 2019 Amazing Grace became available on streaming media Hulu.

Chart (2019)	Peak position	Ref(s)
U.S. Music Video Sales (Billboard)	1	
UK Official Music Video Chart (OCC)	1	

== Reception ==
=== Box office ===
Amazing Grace grossed $4,450,454 in the United States and Canada, and $739,664 in other territories, for a total worldwide gross of $5,190,118. On its domestic opening weekend the film grossed $57,353, averaging $19,118 per location. The film earned $111,389 during its awards' qualifying run in December. Upon its general release on 5 April, the film made $88,098 in its opening weekend across 8 screens finishing 30th at the box office. In its second weekend it made $349,082, a 296% increase and $603,302 in its third and highest, the film was added to 132 theatres over the previous week for a total of 190.

==== Other territories ====
In the United Kingdom it was released on 10 May 2019, by StudioCanal and grossed £166,593 on its opening weekend in 69 cinemas, and grossed a total of £586,110 ($740,412) over a four-week period. In Norway it grossed a total of $116,724 in its first week on 57 screens and $53,241 on 53 screens on its second weekend for a total of $258,667. By the fourth weekend it increased to 56 screens for a box office total of $444,083. It was released in Australia on 29 August, making $132,675 on its opening weekend ranking twelfth and $94,199 on its second grossing a total of $370,187.

=== Critical response ===
On the review aggregator Rotten Tomatoes, the film holds an approval rating of 99% based on 160 reviews, with an average rating of 8.6/10. The website's critical consensus reads, "Brilliantly capturing a remarkable performer near the peak of her prodigious power, Amazing Grace is a thrilling must-watch documentary for Aretha Franklin fans." Metacritic, which uses a weighted average, assigned the film a score of 94 out of 100, based on 27 critics, indicating "Universal acclaim".

Odie Henderson of RogerEbert.com enthused, "Whether you're religious or not, you owe it to yourself to see this movie if the chance arises. You'll see how much love and feeling went into the construction of the resulting album." Variety's Owen Gleiberman noted, "The movie reveals how the fundamental distinction between "rock 'n' roll" and "rhythm and blues" was not only racist at its core, but a way for the consumer culture to slice the God out of music that was invented as a way to talk to God." Jordan Hoffman of The Guardian wrote, "The film is almost wall-to-wall music, with Franklin barely acknowledging the audience between songs." The Los Angeles Times' Justin Chang wrote: "Aretha Franklin didn't transcend the gospel or gospel music; as first her album and now this marvelous documentary remind us, she did more than most to fulfill its potential for truth and beauty, devotion and art."

Hoffman wrote, "And we can quibble as to whether Pollack, Elliot or credited editor Jeff Buchanan is the true author of the piece." Producer Chiemi Karasawa claimed her work on the film was not compensated and filed an arbitration case against Alan Elliott upon its release. Armond White of National Review criticized the film's politics, writing: "Is playing into the approval of white people the only way that bourgeois black people can think to confirm their significance? To reduce Franklin's art to the propaganda of 'empowerment' and activism disrespects the daily significance of the civil-rights movement and its basis in the sanctified church."

==== Accolades ====
Award	Year	Category	Result	Ref(s).
AARP Movie Awards	2019	Best Documentary	Nominated	
Black Reel Awards	2019	Outstanding Documentary	Nominated	
Christian Science Monitor	2018	Top Ten Best Films of 2018	3rd Place	
Critics' Choice Movie Award for Best Documentary Feature	2019	Best Archival Documentary	Nominated	
Critics' Choice Movie Award for Best Documentary Feature	2019	Best Music Documentary	Nominated	
Central Ohio Film Critics Association	2020	Best Documentary	Nominated	
Detroit Film Critics Society	2019	Best Documentary	Nominated	
Dublin Film Critics' Circle	2019	Best Documentary	6th place	
National Society of Film Critics Awards	2019	Best Non-Fiction Film	Nominated	
NAACP Image Awards	2019	Outstanding Documentary	Won	
Rotten Tomatoes	2019	Top 100 Movies Of 2019	20th place	
