= Plundered My Soul =

Single by The Rolling Stones

from the album Exile on Main St. (reissue)
- B-side: "All Down the Line"
- Released: 17 April 2010
- Recorded: 1971, 2009
- Genre: Blues rock; Gospel
- Length: 3:56
- Label: Universal Music
- Songwriter: Jagger/Richards
- Producers: Jimmy Miller, Don Was, The Glimmer Twins

The Rolling Stones singles chronology
"Biggest Mistake" (2006)	"Plundered My Soul" (2010)	"No Spare Parts" (2011)

Professional ratings
Review scores
Source	Rating
Rolling Stone	4/5 stars

"Plundered My Soul" is a song by the English rock band the Rolling Stones, featured as a bonus track on the 2010 re-release of their 1972 album Exile on Main St.. It was the first song released by the band from the new recordings, limited-edition copies of the single shelved in independent stores on 17 April 2010, in honor of Record Store Day. The song charted at number 2 on Billboard's Singles Sales and number 42 on Billboard's Rock Songs Airplay. It also reached number 15 in France, and remained there for one week. The music video was directed by Jonas Odell.

"Plundered My Soul" features vocal and guitar overdubs from Mick Jagger and Mick Taylor, recorded at a London studio in November 2009 as arranged by Sherry Daly and Saul Davis.

== Personnel ==
The Rolling Stones

- Mick Jagger – lead vocals, acoustic guitar, percussion
- Keith Richards – rhythm guitar
- Mick Taylor – lead guitar
- Bill Wyman – bass guitar
- Charlie Watts – drums

Additional musicians

- Nicky Hopkins – piano, organ
- Bobby Keys – saxophone
- Lisa Fischer – backing vocals
- Cindy Mizelle – backing vocals

== Charts ==
Chart (2010)	Peak position
France (SNEP)	15
Netherlands (Single Top 100)	3
Sweden (Sverigetopplistan)	27
US Hot Rock & Alternative Songs (Billboard)	42
US Rock & Alternative Airplay (Billboard)	42
