= Sweet Virginia =

Song by The Rolling Stones

from the album Exile on Main St.
- Released: 12 May 1972
- Recorded: 30 June – July 1970, 7 June 1971 – March 1972
- Studio: Olympic, London; Rolling Stones Mobile Studio, Villa Nellcôte; Sunset Sound, Los Angeles
- Genre: Country rock; blues rock
- Length: 4:27
- Label: Rolling Stones Records
- Songwriters: Mick Jagger; Keith Richards
- Producer: Jimmy Miller

"Sweet Virginia" is a song written by Mick Jagger and Keith Richards, and was the sixth song on the Rolling Stones' 1972 double album Exile on Main St. The song is a slow country-inspired composition with a saxophone solo.

This album was mostly recorded in Villa Nellcôte, France, as well as at Olympic Studios in 1970, with vocal overdubs added in early 1972 at Sunset Sound Studios. The song features a harmonica solo by Jagger and a saxophone solo by Bobby Keys. Drummer Charlie Watts plays a country shuffle rhythm. An alternate version without the backing singers was released on bootlegs. The song was also released as the B-side of the Stones' "Rocks Off" single in Japan.

The version of the song that the band re-recorded for Stripped is featured in Martin Scorsese's 1995 film Casino. The original recording is played over the closing credits of Rian Johnson's 2019 film Knives Out.

== History ==
"Sweet Virginia" is an acoustic song that is thought to have been influenced by Gram Parsons and by the drug-fueled atmosphere of Nellcôte, where the album was mostly recorded during a series of chaotic recording sessions. The lyrics allude to drug use and pills and low-grade heroin ("drop your reds, drop your greens and blues", "I hid the speed inside my shoe", and "got to scrape that shit right off your shoes").

In a 1973 Crawdaddy interview, Parsons said that he 'didn't work with the Stones that much. I did a few things with them...like with "Wild Horses", "Dead Flowers", and "Sweet Virginia"...I sang on "Sweet Virginia". Gram thought that he 'sort of did' turn the Stones on to a more basic consideration of country.

== Reception ==
Classic Rock History critic Matthew Pollard rated "Sweet Virginia" as the Rolling Stones' 4th best deep cut, calling it "a pretty little Country-inspired work of genius that’s thought-provoking and inspiring as it is a real crowd-pleasing sing-along."

=== Legal problems ===
After the release of Exile on Main St., Allen Klein sued the Rolling Stones for breach of settlement because "Sweet Virginia" and four other songs on the album were composed while Jagger and Richards were under contract with Klein's company ABKCO Records. ABKCO acquired publishing rights to these songs, giving it a share of the royalties from Exile on Main St.. Additionally, ABKCO was able to publish another album consisting of previously released Rolling Stones songs, More Hot Rocks (Big Hits & Fazed Cookies).

== Live performances ==
"Sweet Virginia" was performed by the Stones during their 1972 American tour, and it was featured in the concert film Ladies and Gentlemen: The Rolling Stones, released in 1974. The Stones performed the song occasionally in 1973, and it returned to their set-lists on their 1994 Voodoo Lounge Tour, 2005 A Bigger Bang Tour, and 2017 No Filter Tour.

"Sweet Virginia" has also been covered in concert by the bands Phish and Old Crow Medicine Show.

== Personnel ==
According to authors Philippe Margotin and Jean-Michel Guesdon:

The Rolling Stones

- Mick Jagger – vocals, harmonica
- Keith Richards – backing vocals, acoustic guitar
- Mick Taylor – backing vocals (Note: While it was later rumored that American musician Gram Parsons contributed backing vocals to the track, Taylor stated in 2002 that he, and not Parsons, was the one singing.), lead acoustic guitar
- Bill Wyman – bass
- Charlie Watts – drums

Additional musicians

- Ian Stewart – piano
- Bobby Keys – saxophone
- Unidentified musicians – backing vocals, hand claps
