= Cocksucker Blues =

Unreleased American documentary film by Robert Frank

- Directed by: Robert Frank; Daniel Seymour
- Produced by: Marshall Chess
- Starring: The Rolling Stones
- Edited by: Robert Frank; Paul Justman; Susan Steinberg
- Music by: The Rolling Stones
- Release date: 1972
- Running time: 93 minutes
- Country: United States
- Language: English

Cocksucker Blues is an unreleased documentary film directed by the still photographer Robert Frank chronicling The Rolling Stones American Tour 1972 in support of their album Exile on Main St.

== Production ==
The film was shot cinéma vérité, with several cameras available for anyone in the entourage to pick up and start shooting. This allowed the film's audience to witness backstage parties, drug use (Mick Taylor is shown smoking marijuana with some roadies and Mick Jagger seen snorting cocaine backstage), roadie and groupie antics, and the Stones with their defences down. One scene includes a groupie in a hotel room injecting heroin.

== Fate ==
The film came under a court order which forbade it from being shown unless the director, Robert Frank, was physically present. This ruling stemmed from the conflict that arose when the band, having commissioned the film, decided that its content was embarrassing and potentially incriminating, and did not want it shown. Frank felt otherwise, hence the ruling.

According to Ray Young, "The salty title notwithstanding, its nudity, needles and hedonism was supposedly incriminating and the picture was shelved—this during a liberal climate that saw the likes of Cry Uncle! and Chafed Elbows playing in neighborhood theatres." Deep Throat was released in the same year. A Rolling Stones concert film, Ladies and Gentlemen: The Rolling Stones, was released instead, and Cocksucker Blues was indefinitely shelved.

The court order in question also enjoined Frank against exhibiting Cocksucker Blues more frequently than four times per year in an "archival setting" with Frank being present. Frank personally introduced one such rare screening of the film on February 23, 1988, at Boston's Cinema 57 theater in Park Square in conjunction with promoting the release that week of his new film, Candy Mountain.

Other screenings have included the Metropolitan Museum of Art in New York on October 3, 2009 (curator Jeff Rosenheim, introducing the movie, mentioned that Robert Frank was "in the building," but pointed out that the building was over 2,000,000 square feet (190,000 m^{2})), the Museum of Modern Art in New York in November 2012 as part of a two-week festival, "The Rolling Stones: 50 Years on Film", the Cleveland Cinematheque on November 15, 2013, the Chuck Jones Theater during the 2015 Telluride Film Festival, and the Rotterdam, Netherlands 2015 International Documentary Film Festival Amsterdam (IDFA) as part of a Robert Frank retrospective, with Frank in attendance.

== See also ==
- List of American films of 1972
