= Ladies and Gentlemen: The Rolling Stones =

1974 rockumentary

- Directed by: Rollin Binzer
- Produced by: Rollin Binzer; Marshall Chess
- Starring: The Rolling Stones
- Cinematography: Steve Gebhardt; Bob Freeze
- Edited by: Laura Lesser; Barbara Palmer
- Music by: The Rolling Stones
- Distributed by: Dragonaire Ltd.
- Release date: 1974
- Running time: 83 minutes
- Country: United States
- Language: English

Ladies and Gentlemen: The Rolling Stones is a concert movie featuring the British rock band the Rolling Stones that was first released in 1974. Directed by Rollin Binzer and produced by Binzer and Marshall Chess, it was filmed in 16mm by Bob Freeze and Steve Gebhardt of Butterfly Films during four shows in Fort Worth, Texas, at the Tarrant County Convention Center and Houston, Texas, at the Hofheinz Pavilion, from the band's 1972 North American Tour in support of their 1972 album Exile on Main St.

== Production ==
The film was shot using 16 mm film, but blown up to 35 mm film with a wet gate process for theatrical release to "make it look like it was shot 35 mm for the wide screen". The concerts were recorded in 32-track audio and the soundtrack was mixed in Twickenham Studios in England. In its initial U.S. theatrical run it was released in "Quadrasound" which was a variation of the four-track magnetic sound format. Instead of the usual right, centre, left and single surround tracks, Quadrasound fed right and left screen speakers and right and left (split surround) speakers. The objective of the quadraphonic sound recording was to transform the 650-seat motion picture theatre auditorium into the auditory phenomenon of a 10,000 seat rock and roll arena. The film began before most audience members even realized it: a black screen and quadraphonic audience noise fooled theatergoers into accepting the recorded ambience as coming from their own venue, intensifying the aural intimacy when the Stones began to play.

== Release ==
The film was sold by the Rolling Stones as a tax-incentive based venture capital investment. Nine investment groups competed to acquire the film and the winning group formed Dragon Aire, a one-film distribution company that was formed to "four-wall" the film throughout the United States. In accordance with the Rolling Stones' contractual requirements, Dragon Aire proceeded to rent theatres on a "four-wall" basis for limited engagements in major markets (due to commence at the Ziegfeld Theatre in New York City on 14 April 1974 (Easter Sunday)) and sell tickets not only at the theatre but also through concert ticket vendors such as Ticketron for the limited engagements. The objective here was to create a limited access single venue event that fans could access from any ticket seller in town. Dragon Aire planned a street fair outside the Ziegfeld to promote the film but cancelled the fair and premiere two days before to avoid any potential trouble as well as the planned 50 performances at the theatre.

The film was played in limited road show engagements during which advertising was stopped (want ads were used after the first two markets) because the word of mouth for the film increased attendance every day throughout the run. Limited engagements were conducted in New York, Boston, Philadelphia, Atlanta, Houston, Chicago, Miami, and Los Angeles before the picture was sold to Plitt Theatres which released the film in a "flat" screen monaural version.

The Quadraphonic presentation of Ladies and Gentlemen... required a 44 JBL driver sound system (four systems were built and used by Dragonaire in its road show performances of the film). Each sound system was capable of generating 3300 Watts RMS, and was transported to each venue in a 14 ft. bed truck. Played at 100 dbA in evening and midnight performances, the sound track had to be mixed by a sound engineer based on the number of people in the audience in order to achieve optimal clarity. Sound engineers accompanied the road show presentations.

== 2010 theatrical re-release ==
Prior to 2010, after initial showings in 1974 the movie was only commercially available in the early 1980s in Australia on VHS by Video Classics, of which bootleg copies had since been circulated. The Rolling Stones re-claimed the film from No Moss Partners, the original investment limited partnership in the late 1990s, and held off from re-releasing it until 2010. On 16 September 2010, a digital re-mastered version of Ladies and Gentlemen was shown in select theaters in the United States, presented by Omniverse Vision, Eagle Rock Entertainment and NCM Fathom. Re-mastered in HD digital, the film also features an introduction by Mick Jagger, interviewed in summer 2010 at the London Dorchester Hotel. This segment features Jagger reflecting on memories of the tour during this legendary time, and the status of the Rolling Stones. This film was released at selected Showcase Cinemas in UK the following day, on Friday 17 September 2010. On 12 October 2010, it was issued on DVD and Blu-ray. Supplements to the concert footage includes tour rehearsal footage from the Montreux Jazz Festival, a 1972 Old Grey Whistle Test interview with Mick Jagger, and a 2010 interview with Jagger. During the performance, Styrofoam Frisbee-like discs with the Stones 'Tongue' emblem were thrown out into the audience to add to the excitement and enhance the realism as if you were actually attending the concert. The Blu-ray release has three choices of soundtrack: Dolby Digital 5.1, DTS-HD Master Audio 5.1, and LPCM stereo, with at least one reviewer genuinely preferring the LPCM 2.0 option.

== Album ==
Ladies and Gentlemen: The Rolling Stones

Live album by The Rolling Stones
- Released: 16 June 2017
- Recorded: 24–25 June 1972
- Venues: Tarrant County Convention Center, Hofheinz Pavilion
- Genre: Rock
- Length: 80:00 min
- Label: Eagle

The Rolling Stones chronology
Blue & Lonesome (2016)	Ladies and Gentlemen: The Rolling Stones (2017)	On Air (2017)

In 2017 Ladies and Gentlemen was released as a standalone CD, on Eagle Records.
Where track 1 is the intro, and track 2 is "Brown Sugar". The band introductions is at the start of "Bye Bye Johnny (track 13).
On the DVD / Blu ray, the Intro is part of "Brown Sugar. The band introductions is at the end of "Midnight Rambler".

== Set list ==
The tracks in the film followed the running order of a typical set list of the 1972 tour, with only songs they recorded between 1968 and 1972, except "Bye Bye Johnny" from their first EP (1964). "Dead Flowers" was played at one of the filmed shows in Fort Worth but not elsewhere on the tour, while "Rocks Off" was absent from the film despite being a constant of the tour set list; in an interview included in the DVD release, Jagger said this was due to it being out of tune. And also "a few strings busted", an extra comment at the end of "Bitch", just after playing "Rocks Off".

All tracks are written by Mick Jagger and Keith Richards, except where noted.

No.	Title	Length
1.	"Brown Sugar" (The show starts at 2m55s)	6:55
2.	"Bitch"
3.	"Gimme Shelter"
4.	"Dead Flowers"
5.	"Happy"
6.	"Tumbling Dice"
7.	"Love in Vain" (Robert Johnson)
8.	"Sweet Virginia"
9.	"You Can't Always Get What You Want"
10.	"All Down the Line"
11.	"Midnight Rambler" (Ends with band introductions)
12.	"Bye Bye Johnny" (Chuck Berry)
13.	"Rip This Joint"
14.	"Jumpin' Jack Flash"
15.	"Street Fighting Man"

Dates, shows and tracks

- 24 June - Ft Worth - Show 1 (3 PM): Tracks 3, 4, 5, 8 - Show 2 (8 PM): Tracks 2, 13
- 25 June - Houston - Show 1: Tracks 6, 7, 9, 12, 14 - Show 2: Tracks 1, 10, 11, 15

== Band members ==
- Mick Jagger – lead vocals; harmonica on "Midnight Rambler" and "Sweet Virginia"
- Keith Richards – rhythm guitar; lead on "Bitch" and "Bye Bye Johnny", acoustic on "Sweet Virginia", lead vocals on "Happy", backing vocals
- Mick Taylor – lead guitar; slide on "Love In Vain" and "All Down The Line", rhythm on "Bitch" and "Bye Bye Johnny", acoustic on "Sweet Virginia"
- Bill Wyman – bass guitar
- Charlie Watts – drums

Additional musicians

- Nicky Hopkins – piano
- Bobby Keys – saxophone
- Jim Price – trumpet, trombone
- Ian Stewart – piano on "Bye Bye Johnny" and "Brown Sugar"

== Charts ==
Chart (2010)	Peak position
Australian Music DVDs Chart	8
Austrian Music DVDs Chart	2
Belgian (Flanders) Music DVDs Chart	3
Belgian (Wallonia) Music DVDs Chart	2
Danish Music DVDs Chart	2
Dutch Music DVDs Chart	6
Finnish Music DVDs Chart	2
German Albums Chart	20
Italian Music DVDs Chart	4
New Zealand Music DVDs Chart	4
Swedish DVDs Chart	1
Swiss Music DVDs Chart	1
UK Music Videos Chart	1
US Music Video Sales	1

Chart (2025)	Peak position
Greek Albums (IFPI)	33

== Certifications ==
Region	Certification	Certified units/sales
Canada (Music Canada)	2× Platinum	20,000^{^}
Germany (BVMI)	Gold	25,000^{^}
New Zealand (RMNZ)	Gold	2,500^{^}
United States (RIAA)	Platinum	100,000^{^}
^{^} Shipments figures based on certification alone.
