= Torn and Frayed =

Song by The Rolling Stones

from the album Exile on Main St.
- Released: 12 May 1972
- Recorded: Summer 1971, December 1971 – March 1972
- Studio: Villa Nellcote and Sunset Sound Recorders, Los Angeles
- Genre: Rock; country rock
- Length: 4:17
- Label: Rolling Stones Records
- Songwriter(s): Mick Jagger; Keith Richards
- Producer(s): Jimmy Miller

"Torn and Frayed" is a song by the English rock band the Rolling Stones that appears on their 1972 album Exile on Main St. Written by Mick Jagger and Keith Richards. In his review of the song, Bill Janovitz called it "a twangy, three-chord honky tonk, but not typically country", and said, "The progression of the chords brings gospel music to mind".

== Background ==
The song is included on side two of Exile, the side known for its acoustic folk and country tunes. Janovitz continued: "The music comes as close to definitive country-rock or Stax-like country-soul as anything from the era, barring Gram Parsons—an immediate influence on the Stones." Gram Parsons was present for the recording sessions of Exile at Nellcôte, and "Torn and Frayed" is perhaps the most overtly Parsons-influenced cut the Stones ever recorded, with a country-soul flavour reminiscent of the Parsons-fronted Flying Burrito Brothers' 1969 debut album The Gilded Palace of Sin.

Al Perkins, a good friend and collaborator of Parsons', performed the song's pedal steel guitar. Jagger sang lead vocals and was accompanied by Richards on backing. Richards provided the song's base of acoustic guitar and electric Telecaster. Mick Taylor played bass and Charlie Watts was on drums. Organ was played by Jim Price and piano by Nicky Hopkins. Basic tracking took place in Richards' basement in the South of France during the summer of 1971, and overdubs were done in Los Angeles' Sunset Sound Studios between December 1971 and March 1972.

Janovitz wrote of the lyrics: "'Torn and Frayed' follows a vagabond-like guitar player whose 'coat is torn and frayed'":

Well the ballrooms and smelly bordellos, and dressing rooms filled with parasites
On stage the band has got problems, they're a bag of nerves on first nights
He ain't tied down to no home town, yeah, and you thought he was reckless
You think he's bad, he thinks you're mad, yeah, and the guitar player gets restless.

== Live performances ==
"Torn and Frayed" was first performed by the Stones on the opening night of the 1972 tour of America in Vancouver, Canada, but was subsequently dropped from the setlist and not played again until the fall 2002 leg of the Licks Tour at several theater shows.

In 2009, it was covered by The Black Crowes on Warpaint Live.

Phish also covered it during their live cover of the entire Exile on Main St. album on 31 October 2009; they also performed it in another of their live shows in Cincinnati on 21 November 2009, during their Superball IX festival in 2011, in Pittsburgh on 23 June 2012, at Saratoga Performing Arts Center on 7 July 2012, and at Moon Palace, Mexico on 20 February 2020. Another performance of the song was on 27 August 2021 at The Gorge Amphitheatre, as tribute to Charlie Watts.
