= Southern California Community Choir =

The Southern California Community Choir is a choir founded by the Rev. James Cleveland.

It has appeared on several recordings, including by artists such as Aretha Franklin, Kansas, Elton John and Arlo Guthrie. It performed on several episodes of TV Gospel Time in the early 1960s, and in the 1980 film The Blues Brothers.

The choir appears in the 2018 concert film Amazing Grace featuring Aretha Franklin recording her 1972 live album of the same name.

== Awards ==
The Choir has received the following awards:

- Grammy Award for Best Soul Gospel Performance (1975)

== Discography ==
- 1972: Amazing Grace - Aretha Franklin
- 1974: Arlo Guthrie
- 1976: Blue Moves - Elton John
- 1988: In the Spirit of Things - Kansas

== See also ==
- List of Grammy Hall of Fame Award recipients A-D
