= Stripped (Rolling Stones album) =

1995 live-and-studio album

Live album by the Rolling Stones
- Released: 13 November 1995
- Recorded: 2 studio sessions: on 3–5 March 1995, Tokyo on 23–26 July 1995, Lisbon + 3 live recordings: on 26–27 May 1995, Paradiso, Amsterdam on 3 July 1995, L'Olympia, Paris on 19 July 1995, Brixton Academy, London
- Genres: Roots rock, blues rock
- Length: 59:34
- Label: Virgin
- Producers: Don Was, The Glimmer Twins

The Rolling Stones chronology
| Voodoo Lounge (1994) | Stripped (1995) | Bridges to Babylon (1997) |

Singles from Stripped
- 1. "Like a Rolling Stone" Released: 30 October 1995; 2. "Wild Horses" Released: 11 March 1996

Professional ratings
Review scores
| Source | Rating |
|---|---|
| AllMusic | 3.5/5 stars |
| Christgau's Consumer Guide | A− |
| Entertainment Weekly | B+ |
| Tom Hull | A− |

Stripped is a live album by the English rock band the Rolling Stones released in November 1995 after the Voodoo Lounge Tour. It contains six live tracks and eight studio recordings. The live tracks were taken from four 1995 performances, at three small venues, and include a cover of Bob Dylan's "Like a Rolling Stone", which was the first single from the album. The remaining eight tracks were acoustic studio re-recordings of songs from the Stones' previous catalogue, the exception being a cover of Willie Dixon's "Little Baby". The studio performances were recorded "live", i.e., without overdubs.

== Overview ==
The two studio sessions took place from 3–5 March 1995 at Toshiba-EMI Studios in Tokyo, Japan and 23–26 July 1995 at Estudios Valentim De Carvalho in Lisbon, Portugal, while the live recordings are from 26 and 27 May, 3 July, and 19 July 1995 performances at three small concert venues: Paradiso, L'Olympia, and Brixton Academy, respectively.

Some CD versions of Stripped included an enhanced portion for viewing on a computer, including videos of rehearsals of "Tumbling Dice" and "Shattered" and an alternate performance of "Like a Rolling Stone", and interviews with Mick Jagger, Keith Richards, Charlie Watts and Ronnie Wood.

Stripped was well-received and reached No. 9 in the UK and the US, where it went platinum. The lead single, a cover of Dylan's "Like a Rolling Stone", reached No. 12 in the UK, and became a rock radio hit in the US. It was followed by "Wild Horses" in early 1996.

Stripped was the Rolling Stones' second album with Virgin Records.

== Totally Stripped ==
Totally Stripped

Live album by The Rolling Stones
- Released: 3 June 2016
- Recorded: March – July 1995
- Genres: Roots rock, blues rock
- Length: 78:54
- Label: Eagle Rock Entertainment

The Rolling Stones chronology
| Live 1965: Music from Charlie Is My Darling (2014) | Totally Stripped (2016) | The Rolling Stones in Mono (2016) |

On 3 June 2016, Totally Stripped, an expanded and reconceived edition of Stripped featuring a documentary film about the original project, was released in multiple formats. These included DVD or Blu-ray documentary-only editions, as well as DVD/Blu-ray & CD and DVD/Blu-ray & LP editions adding a single disc or double-LP of concert highlights (distinct from the tracks that comprised the original album) to the film. The selection of live highlights included 13 previously unreleased performances and one track from the original CD. A limited edition five-disc version (4 DVDs & 1 CD or 4 Blu-ray discs & 1 CD) of the expanded album added three DVD or SD Blu-ray films of the complete concerts and a 60-page booklet to the documentary and the newly compiled CD of concert highlights.

== Artwork ==
The artwork for the album was provided by The Design Corporation, with photography from Anton Corbijn.

== Track listing ==
All tracks written by Mick Jagger and Keith Richards, except where noted.

=== Standard edition ===
1. "Street Fighting Man" – 3:41 (recorded live at Paradiso, Amsterdam, 26 May 1995)
2. "Like a Rolling Stone" (Bob Dylan) – 5:39 (recorded live at Brixton Academy, London, 19 July 1995)
3. "Not Fade Away" (Norman Petty/Charles Hardin) – 3:06 (recorded at Estudios Valentim De Carvalho, Lisbon, July 1995)
4. "Shine a Light" – 4:38 (recorded live at L'Olympia, Paris, 3 July 1995)
5. "The Spider and the Fly" – 3:29 (recorded at Toshiba-EMI Studios, Tokyo, March 1995)
6. "I'm Free" – 3:13 (recorded at Estudios Valentim De Carvalho, Lisbon, July 1995)
7. "Wild Horses" – 5:09 (recorded at Toshiba-EMI Studios, Tokyo, March 1995)
8. "Let It Bleed" – 4:15 (recorded live at L'Olympia, Paris, 3 July 1995)
9. "Dead Flowers" – 4:13 (recorded live at Brixton Academy, London, 19 July 1995)
10. "Slipping Away" – 4:55 (recorded at Toshiba-EMI Studios, Tokyo, March 1995)
11. "Angie" – 3:29 (recorded live at L'Olympia, Paris, 3 July 1995)
12. "Love in Vain" (Robert Johnson) – 5:31 (recorded at Toshiba-EMI Studios, Tokyo, March 1995)
13. "Sweet Virginia" – 4:16 (recorded at Estudios Valentim De Carvalho, Lisbon, July 1995)
14. "Little Baby" (Willie Dixon) – 4:00 (recorded at Toshiba-EMI Studios, Tokyo, March 1995)

=== Outtakes ===
Officially released outtakes Some outtakes from this album have also been officially released, including:

1. "Honest I Do" (Jimmy Reed) (Hope Floats Movie Soundtrack) (recorded at Toshiba-EMI Studios, Tokyo, March 1995)
2. "All Down the Line" ("Like a Rolling Stone" single) (recorded live at Paradiso, Amsterdam, 27 May 1995)
3. "Black Limousine" (Jagger/Richards/Ronnie Wood) ("Like a Rolling Stone" single) (recorded live at Brixton Academy, London, 19 July 1995)
4. "Gimme Shelter" ("Wild Horses" single) (recorded live at Paradiso, Amsterdam, 26 May 1995)
5. "Tumbling Dice" ("Wild Horses" single) (backstage rehearsal in Amsterdam on 26 or 27 May 1995; live at L'Olympia, Paris on 3 July 1995)
6. "Live with Me" ("Wild Horses" single) (recorded live at Brixton Academy, London, 19 July 1995)
7. "It's All Over Now" (Bobby Womack/Shirley Womack) (e-download only) (recorded live at Paradiso, Amsterdam, 27 May 1995)

Other circulating outtakes include the following studio recordings:

- "Let's Spend the Night Together"
- "No Expectations"
- "Beast of Burden"
- "Memory Motel"
- "Let It Bleed"

=== 2016 Totally Stripped five-disc limited edition ===
==== CD Track listing ====
1. "Not Fade Away" (Norman Petty/Charles Hardin) – (recorded live at Paradiso, Amsterdam, 26 May 1995)
2. "Honky Tonk Women" – (recorded at L'Olympia, Paris, 3 July 1995)
3. "Dead Flowers" – (recorded live at Paradiso, Amsterdam, 26 May 1995)
4. "Far Away Eyes" – (recorded live at Brixton Academy, London, 19 July 1995)
5. "Shine a Light" – (recorded live at Paradiso, Amsterdam, 26 May 1995)
6. "I Go Wild" – (recorded at L'Olympia, Paris, 3 July 1995)
7. "Miss You" – (recorded live at Brixton Academy, London, 19 July 1995)
8. "Like a Rolling Stone" (Bob Dylan) – (recorded live at Paradiso, Amsterdam, 26 May 1995)
9. "Brown Sugar" – (recorded at L'Olympia, Paris, 3 July 1995)
10. "Midnight Rambler" – (recorded live at Brixton Academy, London, 19 July 1995)
11. "Jumpin' Jack Flash" – (recorded at L'Olympia, Paris, 3 July 1995)
12. "Gimme Shelter" – (recorded live at Paradiso, Amsterdam, 26 May 1995)
13. "Rip This Joint" – (recorded live at Paradiso, Amsterdam, 26 May 1995)
14. "Street Fighting Man" – (recorded live at Paradiso, Amsterdam, 26 May 1995)

==== DVD/Blu-ray #1: Totally Stripped documentary (new version) ====
This new version includes 30 minutes of never-before-released rehearsals and interviews.

Stripped
1. "Love in Vain"
2. "The Spider and the Fly"
3. "Wild Horses"
4. "Let It Bleed"

Paradiso, Amsterdam

1. "Down in the Bottom"
2. "Tumbling Dice"
3. "Not Fade Away"
4. "Dead Flowers"
5. "Gimme Shelter"

Olympia, Paris

1. "You Got Me Rocking"
2. "I Go Wild"
3. "Shine a Light"
4. "Jumpin' Jack Flash"

Brixton Academy, London

1. "I Can't Get Next to You"
2. "Honky Tonk Women"
3. "Far Away Eyes"
4. "Like a Rolling Stone"

==== DVD/Blu-ray #2: Paradiso, Amsterdam, 26 May 1995 ====
1. "Not Fade Away"
2. "It's All Over Now" (Bobby Womack/Shirley Womack)
3. "Live with Me"
4. "Let It Bleed"
5. "The Spider and the Fly"
6. "Beast of Burden"
7. "Angie"
8. "Wild Horses"
9. "Sweet Virginia"
10. "Dead Flowers"
11. "Shine a Light"
12. "Like a Rolling Stone"
13. "Connection"
14. "Slipping Away"
15. "The Worst"
16. "Gimme Shelter"
17. "All Down the Line"
18. "Respectable"
19. "Rip This Joint"
20. "Street Fighting Man"

==== DVD/Blu-ray #3: Olympia, Paris, 3 July 1995 ====
1. "Honky Tonk Women"
2. "Tumbling Dice"
3. "You Got Me Rocking"
4. "All Down the Line"
5. "Shattered"
6. "Beast of Burden"
7. "Let It Bleed"
8. "Angie"
9. "Wild Horses"
10. "Meet Me in the Bottom" (Willie Dixon)
11. "Shine a Light"
12. "Like a Rolling Stone"
13. "I Go Wild"
14. "Miss You"
15. "Connection"
16. "Slipping Away"
17. "Midnight Rambler"
18. "Rip This Joint"
19. "Start Me Up"
20. "It's Only Rock 'n Roll (But I Like It)"
21. "Brown Sugar"
22. "Jumpin' Jack Flash"

==== DVD/Blu-ray #4: Brixton Academy, London, 19 July 1995 ====
1. "Honky Tonk Women"
2. "Tumbling Dice"
3. "You Got Me Rocking"
4. "Live with Me"
5. "Black Limousine" (Jagger/Richards/Ronnie Wood)
6. "Dead Flowers"
7. "Sweet Virginia"
8. "Far Away Eyes"
9. "Love in Vain"
10. "Down in the Bottom" (Willie Dixon) (Howlin' Wolf cover)
11. "Shine a Light"
12. "Like a Rolling Stone"
13. "Monkey Man"
14. "I Go Wild"
15. "Miss You"
16. "Connection"
17. "Slipping Away"
18. "Midnight Rambler"
19. "Rip This Joint"
20. "Start Me Up"
21. "Brown Sugar"
22. "Jumpin' Jack Flash"

== Personnel ==
The Rolling Stones

- Mick Jagger – lead vocals, harmonica, guitar, maracas on "Not Fade Away"
- Keith Richards – guitar, backing vocals; lead vocals on "Slipping Away"
- Ronnie Wood – guitar, lap slide
- Charlie Watts – drums

Additional musicians

- Darryl Jones – bass guitar, backing vocals on "Slipping Away"
- Chuck Leavell – keyboards, backing vocals
- Lisa Fischer – backing vocals
- Bernard Fowler – backing vocals, percussion
- Bobby Keys – saxophone
- Michael Davis – trombone
- Kent Smith – trumpet
- Andy Snitzer – saxophone
- Don Was – Hammond B-3 Organ on "Shine a Light"

== Charts ==
=== Weekly charts ===
| Chart (1995–1996) | Peak position |
|---|---|
| Australian Albums (ARIA) | 7 |
| Austrian Albums (Ö3 Austria) | 2 |
| Belgian Albums (Ultratop Flanders) | 6 |
| Belgian Albums (Ultratop Wallonia) | 6 |
| Canada Top Albums/CDs (RPM) | 1 |
| Dutch Albums (Album Top 100) | 2 |
| Finnish Albums (Suomen virallinen lista) | 5 |
| French Albums (SNEP) | 4 |
| German Albums (Offizielle Top 100) | 3 |
| Hungarian Albums (MAHASZ) | 36 |
| Italian Albums (Musica e Dischi) | 7 |
| Japanese Albums (Oricon) | 12 |
| New Zealand Albums (RMNZ) | 23 |
| Norwegian Albums (VG-lista) | 1 |
| Swedish Albums (Sverigetopplistan) | 1 |
| Swiss Albums (Schweizer Hitparade) | 3 |
| UK Albums (Official Charts) | 9 |
| US Billboard 200 | 9 |

=== Year-end charts ===
| Chart (1995) | Peak position |
|---|---|
| Canada Top Albums/CDs (RPM) | 92 |
| French Albums (SNEP) | 67 |

| Chart (1996) | Peak position |
|---|---|
| Canada Top Albums/CDs (RPM) | 65 |
| German Albums (Offizielle Top 100) | 78 |
| US Billboard 200 | 97 |

== Certifications and sales ==
| Region | Certification | Certified units/sales |
|---|---|---|
| Australia (ARIA) | Gold | 35,000^{^} |
| Austria (IFPI Austria) | Gold | 25,000^{*} |
| Belgium (BRMA) | Gold | 25,000^{*} |
| France (SNEP) | 2× Gold | 200,000^{*} |
| Germany (BVMI) | Gold | 250,000^{^} |
| Japan (RIAJ) | Gold | 129,600 |
| Netherlands (NVPI) | Gold | 50,000^{^} |
| Norway (IFPI Norway) | Platinum | 50,000^{*} |
| Spain (Promusicae) | Gold | 50,000^{^} |
| United Kingdom (BPI) | Gold | 100,000^{^} |
| United States (RIAA) | Platinum | 1,000,000^{^} |
Summaries
| Europe (IFPI) | Platinum | 1,000,000^{*} |
| Worldwide | — | 3,500,000 |
^{*} Sales figures based on certification alone.^{^} Shipments figures based on certification alone.
