= Robert Greenfield =

American journalist

Robert Greenfield (born 1946) is an American author, journalist and screenwriter.

== Career ==
Greenfield began his career as a sports writer. He has published book reviews in New West magazine and The New York Times Book Review.

From 1970 to 1972, Greenfield was employed as an associate editor with Rolling Stone's London bureau. During this time he interviewed numerous musicians and writers, including Jack Bruce, John Cale, Neil Young, Elton John, Nico, the Rolling Stones, Jackie Lomax, Leon Russell, Stone the Crows, Woody Allen and Germaine Greer. His 1971 interview with Keith Richards in the south of France at Villa Nellcôte, Villefranche-sur-Mer, was included in Exile, a collection of photographs by Dominique Tarlé (Genesis Publications; 2001).

Greenfield was a popular music critic for Boston After Dark. He was an adjunct professor of composition and literature at the University of San Francisco, and has also taught at Chapman University and Cabrillo College.

Prior to joining Rolling Stone, he worked as a freelance journalist for Eye and Cavalier. A 1969 Eye article profiled early free-form radio at WFMU in East Orange, New Jersey and other locations. Esquire, Playboy, and GQ have published his short fiction.

Greenfield writes primarily on pop culture, and has published two novels. His first novel was Haymon’s Crowd (1978). Temple (1983) is a semi-autobiographical book and play about a young man who is the grandson of a Holocaust survivor and obsessed with soul music.

In 2000, his one-man play, Bill Graham Presents, ran at the Canon Theater in Los Angeles. It was based on the biography Greenfield co-wrote about the rock music promoter. Ron Silver played Graham.

== Personal life ==
Greenfield lives in Carmel-by-the-Sea, California.

== Bibliography and filmography ==
=== Non-fiction ===
- S.T.P.: A Journey Through America With the Rolling Stones (1974)
- The Spiritual Supermarket: An Account of Gurus Gone Public In America (1975)
- Bill Graham Presents: My Life Inside Rock and Out (1992; with Bill Graham)
- Dark Star: An Oral Biography of Jerry Garcia (1997)
- Timothy Leary: A Biography (2006)
- Exile on Main St.: A Season in Hell with the Rolling Stones (2006)
- A Day in the Life: One Family, the Beautiful People, & the End of the Sixties (2009; a biography of British socialites Tommy Weber and Susan Coriat)
- The Last Sultan: The Life and Times of Ahmet Ertegun (2012)
- Ain't It Time We Said Goodbye: The Rolling Stones on the Road to Exile (2014; memoir of The Rolling Stones UK Tour 1971)
- Bear: The Life and Times of Augustus Owsley Stanley III (2016)
- Mother American Night: My Life in Crazy Times (2018; with John Perry Barlow)

=== Novels ===
- Haymon’s Crowd (1978)
- Temple (1983)

=== Plays ===
- Temple
- Bill Graham Presents (2000)

=== Television and film ===
- Co-writer of The '60s, an Emmy-nominated dramatic mini-series
- Producer of three short documentary films on permanent display at the Rock 'n Roll Hall of Fame and Museum

== Awards ==
- 1983: National Jewish Book Awards for Temple
