= Sweet Black Angel =

Single by the Rolling Stones

from the album Exile on Main St.
- A-side: "Tumbling Dice"
- Released: 14 April 1972
- Recorded: October 1970, December 1971 – March 1972
- Studio: Stargroves, East Woodhay, England; Sunset Sound Recorders, Los Angeles
- Genre: Folk; blues; world music
- Length: 2:58
- Label: Rolling Stones Records
- Songwriter(s): Jagger/Richards
- Producer(s): Jimmy Miller

The Rolling Stones singles chronology
"Wild Horses" (1971)	"Tumbling Dice" / "Sweet Black Angel" (1972)	"Happy" (1972)

"Sweet Black Angel" (sometimes known as "Black Angel") is a song by the Rolling Stones, included on their 1972 album Exile on Main St. It was also released on a single as the B-side to "Tumbling Dice" prior to the album. The song features a West Indian rhythm.

== Writing and recording ==
Written by Mick Jagger and Keith Richards, "Sweet Black Angel" is one of the few outright political songs released by the Rolling Stones. Jagger was inspired to write the song after seeing a poster of civil rights activist Angela Davis. At the time, Davis was facing murder charges.

Initial recording took place at Stargroves, Mick Jagger’s home in England during the mid 1970 Sticky Fingers sessions with overdubs and final mixing being completed later at Sunset Sound Studios in Los Angeles between December 1971 and March 1972.

== Music and lyrics ==
“Sweet Black Angel” is a country-blues ballad with a West Indian rhythm. Jagger is on lead vocals and harmonica, Richards on guitar and backing vocals, Mick Taylor on guitar, Bill Wyman on bass and Charlie Watts on drums. Richard “Didymus” Washington plays marimba while producer Jimmy Miller lends support on percussion.

Though Angela Davis is not mentioned by name in the lyrics, the lyrics of the song call "obliquely" for justice for Davis.

== Critical reception ==
Steve Kurutz writes in his review:

Having never heard of Angela Davis, a listener could easily overlook the political lyrics and get lost in the circular acoustic plucking or the washboard rhythm that propels the song so well. Yet, by knowing the case history one realizes how deft and clever Mick's lyrics could be, even if he hides behind his best backwoods diction and garbled annunciation [sic] obscure[s] the point.

== Live performances ==
“Sweet Black Angel” was performed live by the Stones only once, in Fort Worth on 24 June 1972.

== Personnel ==
According to authors Philippe Margotin and Jean-Michel Guesdon:

The Rolling Stones

- Mick Jagger – vocals, harmonica
- Keith Richards – acoustic guitar, backing vocals
- Mick Taylor – acoustic guitar (Margotin and Guesdon were uncertain about this)
- Bill Wyman – bass
- Charlie Watts – woodblock (Margotin and Guesdon were uncertain about this)

Additional musicians

- Jimmy Miller – güiro
- Richard 'Didymus' Washington – marimba
