= I Just Want to See His Face =

Song by The Rolling Stones

from the album Exile on Main St.
- Released: 12 May 1972
- Recorded: December 1971 – March 1972
- Genre: Rock; gospel
- Length: 2:52
- Label: Rolling Stones Records
- Songwriters: Mick Jagger; Keith Richards
- Producer: Jimmy Miller

"I Just Want to See His Face" is a song by English rock band the Rolling Stones featured on their 1972 release Exile on Main St. It is credited to Mick Jagger and Keith Richards.

== Background ==
In 1992, Jagger commented:

"I Just Want to See His Face" was a jam with Charlie [Watts] and Mick Taylor ... I think it was just a trio originally, though other people might have been added eventually. It was a complete jam. I just made the song up there and then over the riff that Charlie and Mick were playing. That's how I remember it, anyway.

== Reception ==
Music reviewer Bill Janovitz writes, "‘I Just Want to See His Face’ has the band exploring the music of America, specifically the country, blues, folk, and soul of the South ... [it] sounds ancient and from another planet; a swampy, stompy gospel song that was recorded to intentionally sound as if it is a field recording document of a long-ago church basement revival meeting." The song's bluesy, murky atmosphere has drawn admiration from other artists. Singer/songwriter Tom Waits names it as one of his favorite recordings: "That song had a big impact on me, particularly learning how to sing in that high falsetto, the way Jagger does. When he sings like a girl, I go crazy," Waits says. "This is just a tree of life. This record is the watering hole."

== Recording ==
The gospel elements to some songs on Exile have been attributed to the presence of Billy Preston during the final recording sessions in Los Angeles. Preston would take Jagger to Sunday services. Initial recording took place in 1970 at Olympic Studios, with overdubs added in early 1972 at Sunset Sound Studios. With Jagger on lead vocals, Keith Richards on electric piano, Mick Taylor plays electric bass and Bill Plummer contributes upright bass. Charlie Watts performs drums with producer Jimmy Miller providing percussion. Clydie King, Venetta Fields, Jerry Kirkland perform the backing vocals for the track.

Bobby Whitlock claims he played the electric piano on the track in a Facebook post dated July 14, 2019. He describes the song development:

This was my part writing this song with Mick. He asked me to play something with a gospel feel as he sang along. Charlie jumped in and Mick Taylor started playing the bass. That's exactly how it went down. Keith Richards was nowhere near the studio, even though he was credited as a writer and piano player on it

On the video, Whitlock shows his part on a 1950's Wurlitzer electric piano, stating:

I am playing the electric piano on this song. The whole thing came from Mick asking me about my Dad being a preacher and if I could play a gospel feel. This was the results. I cranked the vibrato on it and started playing, and Mick Taylor started playing the bass and Charlie started playing the drums and Mick Jagger was sing [sic] 'That's alright, that's alright, I don't want to talk about Jesus, I just want to see his face.' It was recorded at Olympic Studios in London.

CoCo Carmel Whitlock, wife of Bobby Whitlock, states in a 2019 Email to the website owner of www.timeisonourside.com

(Bobby Whitlock) is playing the Wurlitzer on the track. Bobby was at the studio doing business with Jimmy Miller. The guys were all there but Keith, who was out scoring dope (as Bobby tells it). Mick asked about his dad being a preacher and asked Bobby to play something with a gospel feel. Bobby immediately started to play what you hear on the record. Mick began scatting. Bobby was unaware that they were recording. Keith showed up at the end of this jam, and Bobby left. When the record came out, Bobby was in the office with Jimmy Miller thrilled to see it and hear it when he found out they never credited him. He refused to ever listen to that record. The reason they haven't performed it live is because as Chuck Leavell told Bobby, they can't get the vibe. That's because it's a Bobby thing. Bobby should have been credited as a co-writer as he came up with the music, Charlie and Mick Taylor were following his lead as was Mick
