= Ventilator Blues =

Song by the Rolling Stones

from the album Exile on Main St.
- Released: 12 May 1972
- Recorded: October–November 1971, January–March 1972
- Studio: Villa Nellcôte, France; Sunset Sound, Los Angeles
- Genre: Blues rock
- Length: 3:24
- Label: Rolling Stones Records
- Songwriter(s): Jagger-Richards; Mick Taylor
- Producer(s): Jimmy Miller

"Ventilator Blues" is a song by the English rock band the Rolling Stones that is included on their 1972 album Exile on Main St.

== Background ==
“Ventilator Blues” marks one of only two times guitarist Mick Taylor was given credit alongside regular Stones songwriters Mick Jagger and Keith Richards, the second time being the song "Criss Cross" which was not officially released until the 2020 Deluxe Edition of the album Goats Head Soup. In a 1973 interview with Nick Kent, Taylor stated that he wrote the song's riff. The song features Richards playing slide guitar and acoustic guitar, Taylor on lead guitar and a resonator guitar, Jagger on vocals, Bill Wyman on bass, Charlie Watts on drums, Nicky Hopkins on piano, and Bobby Keys and Jim Price on saxophone and trumpet respectively.

The song itself is a low and lumbering blues number, with Bill Janovitz saying in his review, “the instrumental arrangement clearly aims for the Chess Studios approach.” Jagger double tracks the lead vocal, a studio technique rarely used in Rolling Stones recordings. Janovitz concludes, “Jagger takes the Muddy Waters and Howlin' Wolf inspiration of the song's origins and does his best to betray the fact that he is a skinny middle-class English kid, convincingly delivering the time-bomb lyric with appropriate swagger.”

On pianist Nicky Hopkins notable contribution, Janovitz says, “[Hopkins plays] a rhythmically complex piano part on the verses, weaving in and out of the swooping guitar lick on the first verse and then building as the arrangement continues, playing nervous, jittery right-handed upper-register trills. The pianist creates scary tension on an already claustrophobic and malevolent-sounding song.” The song is noted for its rising and falling chord progression, punctuated by the saxophone of Bobby Keys and the trumpet and trombone of Jim Price. Keeping beat is Charlie Watts on drums and Bill Wyman on bass who, although frequently absent during the recording sessions for Exile, made it on this occasion.

== Recording and aftermath ==
Recording on “Ventilator Blues” began in late 1971. Richards said, “On ‘Ventilator Blues’ we got some weird sound of something that had gone wrong - some valve or tube that had gone. If something was wrong you just forgot about it. You'd leave it alone and come back tomorrow and hope it had fixed itself. Or give it a good kick.” Recording concluded in the early months of 1972 at Los Angeles' Sunset Sound Studios.

In 2003, Watts commented:

We always rehearse ‘Ventilator Blues’ [for tours]. It’s a great track, but we never play it as well as the original. Something will not be quite right; either Keith will play it a bit differently or I’ll do it wrong. It’s a fabulous number, but a bit of a tricky one. Bobby Keys wrote the rhythm part, which is the clever part of the song. Bobby said, ‘Why don’t you do this?’ and I said, ‘I can’t play that,’ so Bobby stood next me to clapping the thing and I just followed his timing. In the world of "Take Five", it’s nothing, but it threw me completely and Bobby just stood there and clapped while we were doing the track – and we've never quite got it together as well as that.

== Live ==
The Rolling Stones have performed “Ventilator Blues” live only once, at Pacific Coliseum in Vancouver, British Columbia, on opening night of the 1972 North American Tour in support of Exile on Main Street.
