= Good Time Women =

Song by the Rolling Stones that eventually turned into "Tumbling Dice"

Song by the Rolling Stones

from the album Exile on Main St. (2010)
- Released: 16 May 2010
- Genre: Boogie-woogie
- Length: 3:21
- Songwriter(s): Jagger/Richards

"Good Time Women" is a song recorded by the English rock band the Rolling Stones. A product of Mick Jagger and Keith Richards' songwriting partnership, it is an upbeat song with a blues boogie-woogie rhythm. "Good Time Women" formed the basis of the band's later song, "Tumbling Dice", which was released as a single in 1972.

Recorded at Stargroves using the Rolling Stones Mobile Studio between March and May 1970, "Good Time Women" went unreleased until 2010, when it was included on the deluxe remastered release of the band's 1972 album, Exile on Main St.

== Background and recording ==
"Good Time Women" eventually transformed into "Tumbling Dice". "Good Time Women" was recorded at Stargroves using the Rolling Stones Mobile Studio sometime between March and May 1970 during the sessions for Sticky Fingers.

== Music and lyrics ==
"Good Time Women" is a bluesy boogie-woogie, with heavy emphasis on Ian Stewart's piano work. Though the song has differing lyrics to "Tumbling Dice", it contained a similar structure, chord progression, and melody. Mick Jagger sings the hook to the accompaniment of Mick Taylor's lone lead guitar. However, "Good Time Women" lacked an opening riff, a background choir, and the beat which propels the groove of "Tumbling Dice".

The lyrics of "Good Time Women" are incomplete, consisting largely of gibberish, mentions of cocaine and "dry white wine". The lyrics also refer to "Red light women," or prostitutes, and can be heard as alluding to their then-recent single, "Honky Tonk Women," from 1969.

== Release ==
"Good Time Women" was not initially released, though its successor, "Tumbling Dice" was. An October 1970 recording of "Good Time Women" was included on the 16 May 2010 deluxe remastered issue of Exile on Main St (1972).

== Critical reception ==
Upon its release in 2010, reactions were mixed. Writing for New York Daily News, critic Jim Farber considered "Good Time Women" to merely be "Tumbling Dice" "sped up". However, The Oklahoman entertainment editor Gene Triplett lauded "Good Time Women" as a "stinging guitar rocker", noting how it "sounds like an early version of 'Tumbling Dice' but with a different title ... and different lyrics."
