= Let It Loose (Rolling Stones song) =

Song by the Rolling Stones

from the album Exile on Main St.
- Released: 12 May 1972
- Recorded: June and July 1970, July and August 1971, January to March 1972
- Genre: Rock; soul; gospel blues
- Length: 5:18
- Label: Rolling Stones
- Songwriter: Jagger/Richards
- Producer: Jimmy Miller

"Let It Loose" is a song by the Rolling Stones which was released as the last song on side three of their 1972 double album Exile on Main St.

== Background ==
Written by Mick Jagger and Keith Richards, “Let It Loose” is an emotional gospel blues ballad with a fervent religious feeling, the song being one of the band’s most prominent forays into soul and gospel during the Exile era after Jagger had attended the services of the Reverend James Cleveland and remained deeply impressed by the singing of the gospel choir.

A portion of the lyrics were lifted from the song "Man of Constant Sorrow". In an interview with Uncut magazine in April 2010, Jagger was asked about this song’s lyrical content; he replied: “I think Keith wrote that, actually. That’s a very weird, difficult song. I had a whole other set of lyrics to it, but they got lost by the wayside. I don't think that song has any semblance of meaning. It’s one of those rambling songs. I didn’t really understand what it was about, after the event.” However, in the same article Richards says “I would never take Mick’s recollection of anything seriously.”

== Recording ==
Recording began in June and July 1970 at Olympic Studio in London and at Nellcote in the summer of 1971 and with overdubs added at Sunset Sound in Los Angeles in early 1972. With Jagger on lead vocals, backing vocals are provided by Tami Lynn, Dr. John, Clydie King, Venetta Fields, Shirley Goodman and Joe Greene. Electric guitar is performed by Keith Richards using a Leslie speaker. Bass is performed by Bill Wyman, Charlie Watts on drums, Nicky Hopkins on piano and Mellotron, Bobby Keys on tenor saxophone, and Jim Price plays both trombone and trumpet.

== Reception ==
Russell Hall in the 20 February 2008 edition of Gibson Lifestyle describes Jagger’s strident, heart-wrenching singing on “Let It Loose” as his finest vocal achievement.

== Aftermath ==
“Let It Loose” has never been performed live by the Rolling Stones. Phish covered the song as part of their “costume” album during Festival 8 in 2009, and then again on June 30, 2012.

The song was featured in Martin Scorsese's 2006 film The Departed and appears on its soundtrack. The song was also featured in Kevin Spacey's 2004 film Beyond the Sea, but it was not included on the soundtrack.
