= Rip This Joint =

Song by The Rolling Stones

from the album Exile on Main St.
- Released: 12 May 1972
- Recorded: December 1971 & March 1972
- Genre: Rock & Roll; Rockabilly; hard rock
- Length: 2:23
- Label: Rolling Stones Records
- Songwriter: Jagger/Richards
- Producer: Jimmy Miller

"Rip This Joint" is the second song on the Rolling Stones' classic 1972 album Exile on Main St. Written by Mick Jagger and Keith Richards, "Rip This Joint" is one of the fastest songs in the Stones' catalogue, with a pronounced rockabilly feel. Jagger's breakneck delivery of the song's lines spells out a rambling tale set across America from the perspective of a foreigner.

== Background ==
Richards notes the tempo of the song: "It's one of the fastest ones of the lot and it really keeps you on your toes".

Mama says yes, Papa says no, make up you mind 'cause I got to go.
I'm gonna raise hell at the Union Hall, drive myself right over the wall.
Mister President, Mister Immigration Man, let me in, sweetie, to your fair land.
I'm Tampa bound and Memphis too. Short, fat Fanny is on the loose.

== Reception ==
In his review of the song, Bill Janovitz comments:

The result is a frenetic pace that approaches the tempos played by hardcore punk bands roughly ten years later, certainly recognizing the raw excitement of early roots rock & roll years before ... Though the band most likely did not sit down and preconceive it as such, the record seems to set out to cover nothing less than the wide-open spaces of America itself via the nation's music – from urban soul to down-home country to New Orleans jazz. 'Rip This Joint' sets the tone for this journey, as a modern-day "Route 66" travelogue from Birmingham to San Diego.

== Recording ==
Recording began in late 1971 at Richards' rented home in France, Villa Nellcôte, using the Rolling Stones Mobile Studio. With Jagger on lead vocals, Richards sings back-up and plays electric guitar, along with Mick Taylor, and Charlie Watts plays drums. Bill Plummer provides upright bass for the recording while Nicky Hopkins performs Johnnie Johnson-like piano. Bobby Keys plays two saxophone solos, Jim Price performs trumpet and trombone.

== Live performances ==
"Rip This Joint" was played frequently by the Stones throughout the early to mid-1970s, and appeared in the concert film Ladies and Gentlemen: The Rolling Stones, before disappearing completely from their setlists. The song was reintroduced to the band's setlists at various club dates in Europe on the 1995 Voodoo Lounge Tour (as released in 2016 on Totally Stripped) and was also performed on the Licks Tour in 2002 and 2003.

The song was included as the closing track to the Stones' 1975 compilation album, Made in the Shade.

The song was played in the opening scene of the film, Way of the Gun.

American pop punk band Green Day has performed the song on Late Night with Jimmy Fallon.
