= Loving Cup (song) =

Song by the Rolling Stones

from the album Exile on Main St.
- Released: 12 May 1972
- Genre: Rock
- Length: 4:25
- Label: Rolling Stones Records
- Songwriters: Mick Jagger; Keith Richards
- Producer: Jimmy Miller

"Loving Cup" is a song by the Rolling Stones, which appears on their 1972 album Exile on Main St.

An early version of "Loving Cup", with a completely different piano intro, was recorded between April and July 1969 at Olympic Sound Studios in London, during the Let It Bleed sessions. (This version of the song—or at least part of it, spliced with another outtake—was released in 2010 on the deluxe remastered release of Exile on Main St.)

== Background ==
Mick Jagger performs lead and backing vocals with Keith Richards. Richards plays acoustic and electric guitar, Mick Taylor does not perform on the final version of the song. Bass and drums are provided by Bill Wyman and Charlie Watts, respectively. Piano is provided by Stones' recording veteran Nicky Hopkins. Saxophone is by Bobby Keys and both trumpet and trombone are by Jim Price. The album's producer, Jimmy Miller, provides the maracas. It is not known who plays the steel drum.

== Legal problems ==
After the release of Exile on Main St., Allen Klein sued the Rolling Stones for breach of settlement because "Loving Cup" and four other songs on the album were composed while Jagger and Richards were under contract with his company, ABKCO. ABKCO acquired publishing rights to the songs, giving it a share of the royalties from Exile on Main St., and was able to publish another album of previously released Rolling Stones songs, More Hot Rocks (Big Hits & Fazed Cookies).

== Live performances ==
"Loving Cup" has been performed sporadically by the Stones since its introduction to their catalogue. It was performed at the Stones' concert in Hyde Park on 5 July 1969. Mick Jagger introduced it as "Gimme a Little Drink" at the concert. The song was heard during early shows of the 1972 tour of America and was re-introduced to set lists during the 2002-2003 Licks Tour. It was also performed with Jack White during the 2006 leg of the A Bigger Bang Tour, and this version was featured in the Martin Scorsese 2008 documentary film Shine a Light and on the soundtrack album. The song was most recently played in 2014 during the band's 14 on Fire tour where it was voted into the setlist by fans.

== Reception ==
Jonathan Zwickel of Pitchfork considers it "some of the Rolling Stones' most enduring and soulful work."

== Personnel ==
Credits per Margotin and Guesdon.

The Rolling Stones

- Mick Jagger – lead vocals, backing vocals
- Keith Richards – electric guitar, backing vocals
- Bill Wyman – bass
- Charlie Watts – drums

Additional musicians and production

- Nicky Hopkins – piano
- Bobby Keys – saxophone
- Jim Price – trumpet, trombone
- Jimmy Miller – maracas

== Cover versions ==
The band Phish frequently covers "Loving Cup" during live performances. Their cover appears on several of their live albums, including At the Roxy (2007, recorded 1993), Hampton/Winston-Salem '97 (2011, recorded 1997) and Amsterdam (2015, recorded 1997).
