= Rocks Off =

- Japanese single picture sleeve

Song by the Rolling Stones

from the album Exile on Main St.
- Released: 12 May 1972
- Recorded: July 1971 – March 1972
- Genre: Rock and roll; psychedelic rock
- Length: 4:32
- Label: Rolling Stones Records
- Songwriter: Jagger/Richards
- Producer: Jimmy Miller

"Rocks Off" is the opening song on the Rolling Stones' 1972 double album Exile on Main St. Recorded between July 1971 and March 1972, "Rocks Off" is one of the songs on the album that was partially recorded at Villa Nellcôte, a house Keith Richards rented in the south of France during the summer and autumn of 1971. Overdubs and final mixing for the song were later done at Sunset Sound studios in Los Angeles, California, between December 1971 and March 1972.

== Lyrics and composition ==
The lyrics to the song, difficult to hear since the vocals were mixed very low, describe subjective dissociation, as if from intravenous drug injection. The song features a sudden divergence near the two minute fifteen second mark into a psychedelic jam of sorts, with Mick Jagger's vocals electronically distorted and phased, and the guitar chords stretched.

I feel so hypnotized, can't describe the scene
It's all mesmerized, all that inside me

The song also contained an early use of the word "fuck" in recorded popular music, with the lyric: "Plug in, flush out and fire the fuckin feed". This is a reference to intervenous drugs.

== Recording and releases ==
The song's mix is notoriously haphazard, as many instruments, and even the lead vocals, fade in and out of prominence. The villa's basement, where many of the songs were recorded, was extremely hot and many of the guitars could not stay in tune as a result. Jimmy Miller produced the track, and it features session men Nicky Hopkins on piano, Jim Price on brass, and Bobby Keys on saxophone, as well as regular band members Jagger (lead vocals), Richards (backing vocals, guitar), Charlie Watts (drums), Mick Taylor (guitar), and Bill Wyman (bass).

"Rocks Off" was released as a single in Japan. It was played through the album's 1972 North American Tour and 1973's Winter Tour of Australasia, during which it was the third song in-between "Bitch" and "Gimme Shelter". The song was only played at the first of two opening shows in Baton Rouge during the 1975 Tour of the Americas, and then dropped from any setlist until the Voodoo Lounge Tour of 1994. A live recording was captured during the band's 2002–2003 Licks Tour and released on the 2004 live album Live Licks.

== Reception ==
AllMusic critic Jason Ankeny claims that the song "perfectly sets the mood for what's to follow – murky, gritty, and menacingly raw, its strung-out incoherence captures the record's debauched brilliance with marble-mouthed eloquence." AllMusic's Stephen Thomas Erlewine considers the song a masterpiece. Jonathan Zwickel of Pitchfork considers it "some of the Rolling Stones' most enduring and soulful work".
