= All Down the Line =

Single by the Rolling Stones

from the album Exile on Main St.
- A-side: "Happy"
- Released: 15 July 1972
- Recorded: December 1971 – March 1972
- Studio: Olympic Sound, London; Sunset Sound, Los Angeles
- Genre: Rock; hard rock
- Length: 3:49
- Label: Rolling Stones Records
- Songwriter(s): Jagger–Richards
- Producer(s): Jimmy Miller

The Rolling Stones singles chronology
"Tumbling Dice" (1972)	"All Down the Line" (1972)	"Angie" (1973)

"All Down the Line" is a song by the English rock band the Rolling Stones, which is included on their 1972 album Exile on Main St.. Although at one point slated to be the lead single from the album, it was ultimately released as a single as the B-side of "Happy".

== Background ==
Written by Mick Jagger and Keith Richards, "All Down the Line" is a straight-ahead electric rock song which opens side four of Exile on Main St.. An acoustic version of the song was recorded in 1969 during the early sessions of what would become Sticky Fingers. Recording took place at Nellcôte, Keith Richards's rented villa in France, and at Sunset Sound Studios in Los Angeles.

The Rolling Stones gave a Los Angeles radio station a demo of "All Down the Line" to play while they drove around and listened to it on the radio.

Record World called the song "the Stones at their best."

After the release of Exile on Main St., Allen Klein sued the Rolling Stones for breach of settlement because "All Down the Line" and four other songs on the album were composed while Jagger and Richards were under contract with his company, ABKCO. ABKCO acquired publishing rights to the songs, giving it a share of the royalties from Exile on Main St., and was able to publish another album of previously released Rolling Stones songs, More Hot Rocks (Big Hits & Fazed Cookies).

== Personnel ==
The Rolling Stones

- Mick Jagger – lead vocals
- Keith Richards – rhythm guitar, backing vocals
- Mick Taylor – slide guitar
- Charlie Watts – drums

Additional Performers

- Nicky Hopkins – piano
- Bobby Keys – saxophone
- Jim Price – trumpet, trombone
- Kathi McDonald – backing vocals
- Bill Plummer – standup bass
- Jimmy Miller – maracas

== Concert performances ==
The Rolling Stones performed "All Down the Line" on every tour from 1972 to 1981 and have included the song on every tour since the Voodoo Lounge Tour (1994–95).

Live performances from June 1972 and November 1981 were included in the concert films Ladies and Gentlemen: The Rolling Stones and Let's Spend the Night Together, respectively. A live version of the song from May 1995 appeared as a B-side of the "Like a Rolling Stone" (Live) single promoting the Stripped album. A 2006 performance was captured on the concert film Shine a Light and the accompanying soundtrack album. Despite the popularity of "All Down the Line" as a live song, this was its first appearance on an official live album. A March 2016 performance was included as a bonus track on Havana Moon, although it did not appear in the film of that name.
