= Exile on Main St. =

Studio album by the Rolling Stones
- Released: 12 May 1972
- Studios: Olympic (London); Stargroves (East Woodhay); Rolling Stones Mobile (Nellcôte); Sunset Sound (Los Angeles)
- Genres: Rock and roll; country blues; hard rock
- Length: 67:07
- Label: Rolling Stones
- Producer: Jimmy Miller

The Rolling Stones chronology
Sticky Fingers (1971)	Exile on Main St. (1972)	Goats Head Soup (1973)

Singles from Exile on Main St.
- 1. "Tumbling Dice" Released: 14 April 1972; 2. "Happy" Released: June 1972 (US)

Exile on Main St. is the tenth studio album by the English rock band the Rolling Stones, released on 12 May 1972, by Rolling Stones Records. The 10th released in the UK and 12th in the US, it is viewed as a culmination of a string of the band's most critically successful albums, following Beggars Banquet (1968), Let It Bleed (1969) and Sticky Fingers (1971). Exile on Main St. is known for its wide stylistic range and the strong influence of Delta blues, gospel music, and country rock. The album was originally met with mixed reviews before receiving strong reassessments by the end of the 1970s. It has since been recognized as a pivotal rock album, viewed by many critics as the Rolling Stones' best work and as one of the greatest albums of all time.

The album was a commercial success, topping the charts in six countries, including Netherlands, Norway, Canada, Sweden, the US and UK. Recording began in 1969 at Olympic Studios in London during sessions for Sticky Fingers, with the main sessions beginning in mid-1971 at Nellcôte, a rented villa in the South of France, after the band members became tax exiles. Due to the lack of a professional studio nearby, they worked with a mobile recording studio and recorded in-house. The loose and unorganised Nellcôte sessions went on for hours into the night, with personnel varying greatly from day to day. Recording was completed with overdub sessions at Sunset Sound in Los Angeles and included additional musicians such as the pianist Nicky Hopkins, saxophonist Bobby Keys, drummer and producer Jimmy Miller, and horn player Jim Price. The results produced enough songs for the Stones' first double album.

The band continued a back-to-basics direction heard in Sticky Fingers, yet Exile exhibited a wider range of influences in blues, rock and roll, swing, country and gospel, while the lyrics explored themes related to hedonism, sexuality, and nostalgia. It included the singles "Happy", which featured lead vocals from Keith Richards, the country ballad "Sweet Virginia", and the worldwide top-ten hit "Tumbling Dice". The album's artwork, a collage of various images, reflected the Rolling Stones' prideful rebellion. After its release, the Stones embarked on an American tour, gaining infamy for riotous audiences and performances.

Rolling Stone magazine ranked the album number 7 on its list of the "500 Greatest Albums of All Time" in 2003 and 2012, with it dropping to number 14 in the 2020 edition, consistently as the highest-ranked Rolling Stones album on the list. In 2012, the album was inducted into the Grammy Hall of Fame, the band's fourth album to be inducted. A remastered and expanded version of the album was released in 2010 featuring a bonus disc with 10 new tracks. Unusual for a re-release, it also charted highly at the time of its release, reaching number one in the UK and number two in the US.

== Recording ==
=== Early sessions ===
Exile on Main St. was written and recorded between 1969 and 1972. Mick Jagger said, "After we got out of our contract with Allen Klein, we didn't want to give him [those earlier tracks]", as they were forced to do with "Brown Sugar" and "Wild Horses" from Sticky Fingers (1971). Many tracks were recorded between 1969 and 1971 at Olympic Studios and Jagger's Stargroves country house in East Woodhay during sessions for Sticky Fingers.

By the spring of 1971, the Rolling Stones discovered that due to financial mismanagement by Klein they had grossly underpaid their taxes for several years and were forced to leave England before the British government could seize their assets.Jagger settled in Paris with his new bride Bianca, while guitarist Keith Richards rented a villa, Nellcôte, in Villefranche-sur-Mer, near Nice. The other members settled in the south of France. As a suitable recording studio could not be found where they could continue work on the album, Richards' basement at Nellcôte became a makeshift studio using the band's mobile recording truck.

=== Nellcôte ===
Recording began in earnest sometime near the middle of June. Bassist Bill Wyman recalls the band working all night, every night, from eight in the evening until three the following morning for the rest of the month. Wyman said of that period, "Not everyone turned up every night. This was, for me, one of the major frustrations of this whole period. For our previous two albums we had worked well and listened to producer Jimmy Miller. At Nellcôte things were very different and it took me a while to understand why." By this time Richards had begun a daily habit of using heroin. Thousands of pounds' worth of heroin flowed through the mansion each week, along with visitors such as William S. Burroughs, Terry Southern, Gram Parsons, John Lennon, and Marshall Chess, the son of the famous blues impresario Leonard Chess, who had been recently recruited to serve as president of the Rolling Stones' new eponymous record label. Parsons was asked to leave Nellcôte in early July 1971, due to his disruptive presence and intense drug use, as part of Richards attempt to clear the house of drug users, as the result of pressure from the French police.

Richards' substance abuse frequently prevented him from attending the sessions that continued in his basement, while Jagger and Wyman were often unable to attend sessions for other reasons. This often left the band in the position of having to record in altered forms. A notable instance was the recording of one of Richards' most famous songs, "Happy". Recorded in the basement, Richards said in 1982, "'Happy' was something I did because I was for one time early for a session. There was Bobby Keys and Jimmy Miller. We had nothing to do and had suddenly picked up the guitar and played this riff. So we cut it and it's the record, it's the same. We cut the original track with a baritone sax, a guitar and Jimmy Miller on drums. And the rest of it is built up over that track. It was just an afternoon jam that everybody said, 'Wow, yeah, work on it'".

The basic band for the Nellcôte sessions consisted of Richards, Keys, Mick Taylor, Charlie Watts, Nicky Hopkins, Miller (who covered for the absent Watts on the aforementioned "Happy" and "Shine a Light"), and Jagger when he was available. Wyman did not like the ambiance of Richards' villa and sat out many of the French sessions. Although Wyman is credited on only eight songs of the released album, he told Bass Player magazine that the credits are incorrect and that he actually played on more tracks than that. The other bass parts were credited to Taylor, Richards and the session bassist Bill Plummer. Wyman noted in his memoir Stone Alone that there was a division between the band members and associates who freely indulged in drugs (Richards, Miller, Keys, Taylor and the engineer Andy Johns) and those who abstained to varying degrees (Wyman, Watts and Jagger).

=== Los Angeles ===
Work on basic tracks (including "Rocks Off", "Rip This Joint", "Casino Boogie", "Tumbling Dice", "Torn and Frayed", "Happy", "Turd on the Run", "Ventilator Blues" and "Soul Survivor") began in the basement of Nellcôte and was taken to Sunset Sound Recorders in Los Angeles, where overdubs (all lead and backing vocals, all guitar and bass overdubs) were added during sessions that meandered from December 1971 until March 1972. Although Jagger was frequently missing from Nellcôte, he took charge during the second stage of recording in Los Angeles, arranging for the keyboardists Billy Preston and Dr. John and the cream of the city's session backup vocalists to record layers of overdubs. The final gospel-inflected arrangements of "Tumbling Dice", "Loving Cup", "Let It Loose" and "Shine a Light" were inspired by Jagger, Preston, and Watts' visit to a local evangelical church where Aretha Franklin was recording what would become the live album/movie Amazing Grace.

The extended recording sessions and differing methods on the part of Jagger and Richards reflected the growing disparity in their personal lives. During the making of the album, Jagger had married Bianca, followed closely by the birth of their only child, Jade, in October 1971. Richards was firmly attached to his girlfriend Anita Pallenberg, yet both were in the throes of heroin addiction, which Richards would not overcome until the turn of the decade.

== Music and lyrics ==
According to Bill Janovitz, in his account of the album for the 33⅓ book series, Exile on Main St. features "a seemingly infinite amount of subtle (and not so subtle) variations on rock & roll – a form that had seemed to be severely limited to basic, guitar-driven music." The music biographer John Perry writes that the Rolling Stones had developed a style of hard rock for the album that is "entirely modern yet rooted in 1950s rock & roll and 1930s–1940s swing". Stephen Thomas Erlewine, writing for AllMusic, described Exile on Main St. as "a sprawling, weary double album" featuring "a series of dark, dense jams" that encompass rock and roll, blues, country, and gospel styles. Rolling Stone writer Richard Gehr compared the album to outlaw music and observed a strong influence of music from the American South in its "loose-limbed" explorations of 1950s rock, African-American soul, and gospel country.

Although Exile is often thought to reflect Richards' vision for a raw, rootsy rock sound, Jagger was already expressing his boredom with rock and roll in several interviews at the time of the album's release. Jagger's stance on Exile's rock and roll sound at the time is interpreted by the music academic Barry J. Faulk to seemingly "signal the end of the Stones' conscious attempt to revive American-style roots rock". With Richards' effectiveness seriously undermined by his dependence on heroin, the group's subsequent 1970s releases – directed largely by Jagger – would experiment to varying degrees with other musical genres, moving away from the rootsy influences of Exile on Main St.

According to Robert Christgau, Exile on Main St. expands on the hedonistic themes the band had explored on previous albums such as Sticky Fingers. As he writes, "It piled all the old themes – sex as power, sex as love, sex as pleasure, distance, craziness, release – on top of an obsession with time that was more than appropriate in men pushing 30 who were still committed to what was once considered youth music."

== Packaging ==
For Exile on Main St., Mick Jagger wanted an album cover that reflected the band as "runaway outlaws using the blues as its weapon against the world", showcasing "feeling of joyful isolation, grinning in the face of a scary and unknown future". As the band finished the album in Los Angeles, they approached designer John Van Hamersveld and his photographer partner Norman Seeff, and also invited the documentary photographer Robert Frank. The same day Seeff photographed the Stones at their Bel Air mansion, Frank took Jagger for photographs at Los Angeles' Main Street. The location was the 500 block near the Leonide Hotel. At the time there was a pawnshop, a shoeshine business and a pornographic theatre (The Galway Theatre) at the location. Still, Van Hamersveld and Jagger chose the cover image from an already existing Frank photograph, an outtake from his seminal 1958 book The Americans. Named "Tattoo Parlor" but possibly taken from Hubert's Dime museum in New York City, the image is a collage of circus performers and freaks, such as "Three Ball Charlie", a 1930s sideshow performer from Humboldt, Nebraska, who holds three balls (a tennis ball, a golf ball, and a "5" billiard ball) in his mouth; Joe "The Human Corkscrew" Allen, pictured in a postcard-style advertisement, a contortionist with the ability to wiggle and twist through a 13.5-inch (34 cm) hoop; and Hezekiah Trambles, "The Congo Jungle Freak", a man who dressed as an African savage, in a picture taken by the then recently deceased Diane Arbus. The Seeff pictures were repurposed as 12 perforated postcards inside the sleeve, while Frank's Main Street photographs were used in the gatefold and back cover collage made by Van Hamersveld, which features other pictures Frank took of the band and their crew—including their assistant Chris O'Dell, a former acquaintance of Van Hamersveld who brought him to the Stones—and other The Americans outtakes.

== Release and reception ==
This new album is fucking mad. There's so many different tracks. It's very rock & roll, you know. I didn't want it to be like that. I'm the more experimental person in the group, you see I like to experiment. Not go over the same thing over and over. Since I've left England, I've had this thing I've wanted to do. I'm not against rock & roll, but I really want to experiment. The new album's very rock & roll and it's good. I mean, I'm very bored with rock & roll. The revival. Everyone knows what their roots are, but you've got to explore everywhere. You've got to explore the sky too.

— Mick Jagger, 1972

Exile on Main St. was first released on 12 May 1972 as a double album by Rolling Stones Records. It was the band's tenth studio album released in the United Kingdom. Preceded by the UK (number 5) and US (number 7) Top 10 hit "Tumbling Dice", Exile on Main St was an immediate commercial success, reaching number 1 worldwide just as the band embarked on their celebrated 1972 American Tour. Their first American tour in three years, it featured many songs from the new album. The Richards-sung "Happy" was released as a second single to capitalize on the tour; it would peak at number 22 in the United States in August.

After the release of Exile on Main St., Allen Klein sued the Rolling Stones for breach of settlement because five songs on the album were composed while Jagger and Richards were under contract with his company, ABKCO: "Sweet Virginia", "Loving Cup", "All Down the Line", "Shine a Light" and "Stop Breaking Down" (written by Robert Johnson but re-interpreted by Jagger and Richards). ABKCO acquired publishing rights to the songs, giving it a share of the royalties from Exile on Main St., and was able to release another album of Rolling Stones songs, More Hot Rocks (Big Hits & Fazed Cookies).

Exile on Main St. was not well received by some contemporary critics, who found the quality of the songs inconsistent. Reviewing in July 1972 for Rolling Stone, Lenny Kaye said the record has "a tight focus on basic components of the Stones' sound as we've always known it", including blues-based rock music with a "pervading feeling of blackness". However, he added that the uneven quality of songs means "the great Stones album of their mature period is yet to come". Richard Williams of Melody Maker was more enthusiastic and deemed it the band's best album, writing that it will "take its place in history" as the music "utterly repulses the sneers and arrows of outraged put down artists. Once and for all, it answers any questions about their ability as rock 'n' rollers." Geoffrey Cannon of The Guardian agreed, stating: "Exile On Main Street will go down as [the Stones'] classic album, made at the height of their musical powers and self-confidence." The NME's Roy Carr gave additional praise to the tracks, praising the styles present, the performances of the band and the lyrical content. In a year-end list for Newsday, Christgau named it the best album of 1972, stating the "fagged-out masterpiece" marks the peak of rock music for the year as it "explored new depths of record-studio murk, burying Mick's voice under layers of cynicism, angst and ennui".

== Legacy and reappraisal ==
Professional ratings
Retrospective reviews
Review scores
Source	Rating
AllMusic	5/5 stars
The A.V. Club	A
Christgau's Record Guide	A+
Encyclopedia of Popular Music	5/5 stars
Entertainment Weekly	A+
The Great Rock Discography	10/10
MusicHound Rock	5/5
NME	10/10
The Rolling Stone Album Guide	5/5 stars
Tom Hull – on the Web	A+

Critics later reassessed Exile on Main St. favourably, and by the late 1970s it had become viewed as the Rolling Stones' greatest album. In retrospect, Janovitz called it "the greatest, most soulful, rock & roll record ever made" because it seamlessly distills "perhaps all the essential elements of rock & roll up to 1971, if not beyond". He added that it is "the single greatest rock & roll record of all time", distinguished from other contending albums by the Beatles or Pet Sounds, which are more "brilliant pop records". On the response to the album, Richards said, "When [Exile] came out it didn't sell particularly well at the beginning, and it was also pretty much universally panned. But within a few years the people who had written the reviews saying it was a piece of crap were extolling it as the best frigging album in the world."

In 2003, Jagger said, "Exile is not one of my favourite albums, although I think the record does have a particular feeling. I'm not too sure how great the songs are, but put together it's a nice piece. However, when I listen to Exile it has some of the worst mixes I've ever heard. I'd love to remix the record, not just because of the vocals, but because generally I think it sounds lousy. At the time Jimmy Miller was not functioning properly. I had to finish the whole record myself, because otherwise there were just these drunks and junkies. Of course I'm ultimately responsible for it, but it's really not good and there's no concerted effort or intention." Jagger also stated he did not understand the praise among Rolling Stones fans because the album did not yield many hits.

Richards also said, "Exile was a double album. And because it's a double album you're going to be hitting different areas, including 'D for Down', and the Stones really felt like exiles. We didn't start off intending to make a double album; we just went down to the south of France to make an album and by the time we'd finished we said, 'We want to put it all out.' The point is that the Stones had reached a point where we no longer had to do what we were told to do. Around the time Andrew Oldham left us, we'd done our time, things were changing and I was no longer interested in hitting Number One in the charts every time. What I want to do is good shit—if it's good they'll get it some time down the road."

=== Accolades ===
Exile on Main St. has been ranked on various lists as one of the greatest albums of all time. In 1987, Rolling Stone ranked it third on a list of the 100 best albums from 1967–1987. In 1993, Entertainment Weekly placed it first on their list of "100 Greatest CDs". In 1998, Q magazine readers voted Exile on Main St the 42nd-greatest album of all time, while in 2000 the same magazine placed it at number 3 in its list of the 100 Greatest British Albums Ever. In 2003, Pitchfork ranked it number 11 on their Top 100 Albums of the 1970s. In 2001, VH1 placed it at number 12 on their greatest albums list. In 2003, it was ranked 7th on Rolling Stone's list of the 500 greatest albums of all time, maintaining the rank in a 2012 revision, but dropping to number 14 on the 2020 and 2023 revisions of the list, the highest Rolling Stones album ranked on the list. In 2005, Exile on Main St. was ranked number 286 in Rock Hard's book The 500 Greatest Rock & Metal Albums of All Time. It was ranked number 19 on the October 2006 issue of Guitar World magazine's list of the greatest 100 guitar albums of all time. In 2007, the National Association of Recording Merchandisers (NARM) and the Rock and Roll Hall of Fame placed it sixth on the "Definitive 200" list of albums that "every music lover should own." It was voted number 35 in the 3rd edition of Colin Larkin's All Time Top 1000 Albums (2000) and was included in 1001 Albums You Must Hear Before You Die.

Its re-release has a highest normalised rating of 100 on Metacritic based on seven professional reviews, a distinction it shares with other re-releases such as London Calling by the Clash. In 2012, it was inducted into the Grammy Hall of Fame. Tom Waits named it one of his favorite albums: "this is just a tree of life. This record is the watering hole. Keith Richards plays his ass off. This has the Checkerboard Lounge all over it."

=== In popular culture ===
The album and its title have been referenced several times in popular culture.

The garage-trash noise-rock band Pussy Galore released a complete cover of the album, titled Exile on Main St., that reflected their personal and musical interpretations of the songs, rather than paying tribute to the original sound. John Duffy of AllMusic rated their album three and a half out of five stars, and NME ranked it number 253 in "The 500 Greatest Albums of All Time".

The British acid house group Alabama 3 titled its debut album Exile on Coldharbour Lane. Perhaps the most notable reference comes from indie singer/songwriter Liz Phair's debut album Exile in Guyville. Phair claimed the album to be a direct song-by-song "response" of sorts to Exile on Main St. Post-grunge band Matchbox Twenty paid homage by titling their 2007 retrospective Exile on Mainstream. Industrial rock band Chemlab named the leading track from their album East Side Militia, "Exile on Mainline", in reference to the Rolling Stones album.

The Departed, a 2006 film by Martin Scorsese, features a scene in which Bill Costigan mails Madolyn Madden an Exile on Main St jewel case containing an incriminating recording of Colin Sullivan conspiring with crime boss Frank Costello. The same film also uses the song "Let It Loose" from the album. On 31 October 2009, American rock band Phish covered Exile on Main St in its entirety as the "musical costume" for their Halloween show in Indio, California. The first episode of the fourth season of the Showtime program Californication is called "Exile on Main St". A later episode in the sixth season featured a guest character waking up next to her musician boyfriend who had died from an overdose in the night in room "1009", a reference to the lyrics of "Shine a Light". The same song was also played by Tim Minchin's character in the following episode. The first episode of the sixth season of the hit CW show Supernatural is titled "Exile on Main Street".

== Reissues ==
Professional ratings
2010 deluxe edition
Aggregate scores
Source	Rating
Metacritic	100/100
Review scores
Source	Rating
American Songwriter	5/5 stars
The A.V. Club	B− (Note: A separate score for the deluxe edition's bonus disc.)
Clash	10/10
Entertainment Weekly	B
Pitchfork	10/10
Q	5/5 stars
Record Collector	5/5 stars
Rolling Stone	5/5 stars
Spin	9/10 stars
Uncut	5/5 stars

In 1994, Exile on Main St. was remastered and reissued by Virgin Records, along with the rest of the post-Get Yer Ya-Ya's Out catalogue, after the company acquired the masters to the band's output on its own label. This remaster was initially released in a Collector's Edition CD, which replicated in miniature many elements of the original vinyl album packaging, including the postcards insert.

Universal Music, which remastered and re-released the rest of the post-1970 Rolling Stones catalogue in 2009, issued a new remastering of Exile on Main St. in Europe on 17 May 2010 and in the United States the next day, featuring a bonus disc with ten new tracks. Of the ten bonus tracks, only two are undoctored outtakes from the original sessions: an early version of "Tumbling Dice" entitled "Good Time Women", and "Soul Survivor", the latter featuring a Richards lead vocal (with dummy/placeholder lyrics). The other tracks received overdubs just prior to release on this package, with new lead vocals by Jagger on all except "I'm Not Signifying", backing vocals in places by past and current Stones tour singers Cindy Mizelle and Lisa Fischer, and several new guitar parts by Keith Richards and Mick Taylor on "Plundered My Soul". On the selection of tracks, Richards said, "Well, basically it's the record and a few tracks we found when we were plundering the vaults. Listening back to everything we said, 'Well, this would be an interesting addition.'". All harmonica heard was added during 2010 sessions by Jagger, and Richards added a new guitar lead on "So Divine". "Title 5" is not an actual outtake from the sessions for Exile, it is an outtake from early 1967 sessions. It features the MRB effect (mid-range boost) from a Vox Conqueror or Supreme amp, as used by Richards in 1967 and 1968. "Loving Cup" is an outtake from early June 1969, but is actually an edit from two outtakes. The first 2 minutes and 12 seconds is the well-known 'drunk' version, as has been available on bootlegs since the early 1990s, but the second part is spliced from a second, previously unknown take. "Following the River" features Jagger overdubs on a previously uncirculated track featuring Nicky Hopkins on piano.

The re-released album entered at number one in the UK charts, almost 38 years to the week after it first occupied that position. The album also re-entered at number two in the US charts selling 76,000 during the first week. The bonus disc, available separately as Exile on Main St Rarities Edition exclusively in the US at Target also charted, debuting at number 27 with 15,000 copies sold.

It was released once again in 2011 by Universal Music Enterprises in a Japanese-only SHM-SACD version.

== Track listing ==
All tracks are written by Mick Jagger and Keith Richards, except where noted.

Side one
No.	Title	Writer(s)	Length
1.	"Rocks Off"		4:31
2.	"Rip This Joint"		2:22
3.	"Shake Your Hips"	Slim Harpo	2:59
4.	"Casino Boogie"		3:33
5.	"Tumbling Dice"		3:45

Side two
No.	Title	Length
1.	"Sweet Virginia"	4:27
2.	"Torn and Frayed"	4:17
3.	"Sweet Black Angel"	2:54
4.	"Loving Cup"	4:25

Side three
No.	Title	Writer(s)	Length
1.	"Happy"		3:04
2.	"Turd on the Run"		2:36
3.	"Ventilator Blues"	Jagger–Richards; Mick Taylor	3:24
4.	"I Just Want to See His Face"		2:52
5.	"Let It Loose"		5:16

Side four
No.	Title	Writer(s)	Length
1.	"All Down the Line"		3:49
2.	"Stop Breaking Down"	Robert Johnson	4:34
3.	"Shine a Light"		4:14
4.	"Soul Survivor"		3:49
Total length:			67:07

2010 bonus disc
No.	Title	Length
1.	"Pass the Wine (Sophia Loren)"	4:54
2.	"Plundered My Soul"	3:59
3.	"I'm Not Signifying"	3:55
4.	"Following the River"	4:52
5.	"Dancing in the Light"	4:21
6.	"So Divine (Aladdin Story)"	4:32
7.	"Loving Cup" (alternate take)	5:26
8.	"Soul Survivor" (alternate take)	3:59
9.	"Good Time Women"	3:21
10.	"Title 5"	1:47
11.	"All Down the Line" (alternate take; Japanese bonus track)	4:09

== Personnel ==
The Rolling Stones

- Mick Jagger – vocals; harmonica (on "Shake Your Hips", "Sweet Virginia", "Sweet Black Angel", "Turd on the Run" and "Stop Breaking Down"); electric guitar (on "Tumbling Dice" and "Stop Breaking Down")
- Keith Richards – guitars, backing vocals; bass guitar (on "Casino Boogie", "Happy" and "Soul Survivor"); electric piano (on "I Just Want to See His Face"); lead vocals (on "Happy")
- Mick Taylor – guitars (on all but "Torn and Frayed", "Loving Cup", "I Just Want to See His Face", "Let It Loose", and "Happy"); bass guitar (on "Tumbling Dice", "Torn and Frayed", "I Just Want to See His Face" and "Shine a Light"); backing vocals (on "Sweet Virginia")
- Bill Wyman – bass guitar (on "Rocks Off", "Shake Your Hips", "Sweet Virginia", "Sweet Black Angel", "Loving Cup", "Ventilator Blues", "Let It Loose" and "Stop Breaking Down")
- Charlie Watts – drums (on all tracks except "Tumbling Dice" (outro), "Happy" and "Shine a Light")

Additional personnel

- Nicky Hopkins – piano
- Bobby Keys – tenor saxophone; baritone saxophone and tambourine (on "Happy")
- Jim Price – trumpet, trombone; organ (on "Torn and Frayed")
- Ian Stewart – piano (on "Shake Your Hips", "Sweet Virginia" and "Stop Breaking Down")
- Jimmy Miller – percussion (on "Sweet Black Angel", "Loving Cup", "I Just Want to See His Face" and "All Down the Line"), drums (on "Tumbling Dice" (outro), "Happy" and "Shine a Light")
- Bill Plummer – double bass (on "Rip This Joint", "Turd on the Run", "I Just Want to See His Face" and "All Down the Line")
- Billy Preston – piano, organ (on "Shine a Light")
- Al Perkins – pedal steel guitar (on "Torn and Frayed")
- Richard "Didymus" Washington – marimba (on "Sweet Black Angel")
- Venetta Fields, Clydie King – backing vocals (on "Tumbling Dice", "I Just Want to See His Face", "Let It Loose" and "Shine a Light")
- Bobby Whitlock – Wurlitzer piano (on "I Just Want to See His Face")
- Joe Greene – backing vocals (on "Let It Loose" and "Shine a Light")
- Jerry Kirkland – backing vocals (on "I Just Want to See His Face" and "Shine a Light")
- Shirley Goodman, Tami Lynn, Mac Rebennack — backing vocals (on "Let It Loose")
- Kathi McDonald – backing vocals (on "All Down the Line")

Technical

- Jimmy Miller – producer
- Glyn Johns – engineer
- Andy Johns – engineer
- Joe Zagarino – engineer (misspelled as "Zaganno" on the original credits)
- Jeremy Gee – engineer
- Doug Sax – mastering
- Robert Frank – cover photography and concept
- John Van Hamersveld – layout design
- Norman Seeff – layout design

2010 bonus disc

- Keith Richards – lead vocals (on "Soul Survivor (alternate)")
- Lisa Fischer, Cindy Mizelle – backing vocals
- David Campbell – string arrangement (on "Following the River")
- Don Was and The Glimmer Twins – production
- Bob Clearmountain – mixing

== Charts ==
=== Weekly charts ===
Weekly chart performance for original edition
Chart (1972)	Peak position
Australian Albums (Kent Music Report)	2
Canada Top Albums/CDs (RPM)	1
Dutch Albums (Album Top 100)	1
Finland (The Official Finnish Charts)	7
German Albums (Offizielle Top 100)	2
Japanese Albums (Oricon)	7
Norwegian Albums (VG-lista)	1
Spanish Albums Chart	1
Swedish Albums (Sverigetopplistan)	2
UK Albums (Official Charts)	1
US Billboard 200	1

Weekly chart performance for 2010 reissue
Chart (2010)	Peak position
Australian Albums (ARIA)	6
Austrian Albums (Ö3 Austria)	7
Belgian Albums (Ultratop Flanders)	8
Belgian Albums (Ultratop Wallonia)	9
Finnish Albums (Suomen virallinen lista)	25
French Albums (SNEP)	97
Danish Albums (Hitlisten)	5
Dutch Albums (Album Top 100)	2
German Albums (Offizielle Top 100)	3
Greek Albums (IFPI)	2
Irish Albums (IRMA)	11
Italian Albums (FIMI)	4
Japanese Albums (Oricon)	12
New Zealand Albums (RMNZ)	4
Norwegian Albums (VG-lista)	1
Spanish Albums (Promusicae)	2
Swedish Albums (Sverigetopplistan)	1
Swiss Albums (Schweizer Hitparade)	8
UK Albums (Official Charts)	1
US Billboard 200	2

=== Year-end charts ===
1972 year-end chart performance
Chart (1972)	Position
Australian Albums (Kent Music Report)	19
Dutch Albums (MegaCharts)	11
German Albums (Offizielle Top 100)	29
US Billboard Top Pop Albums	31

2010 year-end chart performance
Chart (2010)	Position
Dutch Albums (MegaCharts)	66
German Albums (GfK)	84
Swedish Albums (Sverigetopplistan)	72
UK Albums (OCC)	126
US Billboard 200	176

== Certifications ==
Certifications for Exile on Main St.
Region	Certification	Certified units/sales
Australia (ARIA) original release	Gold	20,000^{^}
Australia (ARIA) 2010 release	Platinum	70,000^{^}
Italy (FIMI)	Gold	25,000^{*}
New Zealand (RMNZ) 2010 release	Gold	7,500^{^}
United Kingdom (BPI) 2010 release	Platinum	300,000^{*}
United States (RIAA)	Platinum	1,000,000^{^}
^{*} Sales figures based on certification alone.^{^} Shipments figures based on certification alone.

== See also ==
- Album era
