= Shine a Light (Rolling Stones song) =

Song by The Rolling Stones

from the album Exile on Main St.
- Released: 12 May 1972
- Recorded: December 1971
- Studio: Olympic Sound, London
- Genre: Blues rock; gospel
- Length: 4:16
- Label: Rolling Stones Records
- Songwriters: Mick Jagger; Keith Richards
- Producer: Jimmy Miller

"Shine a Light" is a song released by English rock band the Rolling Stones on their 1972 album Exile on Main St. about founding band member Brian Jones and was subsequently reworked and released after his 1969 death.

== Background ==
Although credited to Mick Jagger and Stones guitarist Keith Richards, it is entirely a Mick Jagger composition. Jagger's earliest versions were from 1968 before Jones was expelled from the Stones due to his inability to tour.

A version of the song, under the title "(Can't Seem To) Get a Line on You," was made by Leon Russell at Olympic Studios in October 1969 with assistance from Jagger (lead vocals), Charlie Watts (drums), Leon Russell (piano), and probably also Bill Wyman (bass) and Keith Richards (guitar). The recording was made during the recording sessions for the album Leon Russell (released 1970), where Watts and Wyman contributed drums and bass to some of the tracks. However, the song was shelved until 1993, when it finally surfaced as a bonus track on the 24K gold re-release by DCC Compact Classics (DCC Compact Classics GZS 1049).

After Jones's death in 1969, the song resurfaced. Following revisions by Jagger, it was recorded again in July 1970 as "Shine a Light". A third recording at London's Olympic Sound Studios in December 1971 resulted in the final version of the song released on Exile on Main St.

Saw you stretched out in room ten-o-nine
With a smile on your face and a tear right in your eye
Oh, couldn't seem to get a line on you
My sweet honey love

Berber jewelry jangling down the street
Making bloodshot eyes at every woman that you meet
Could not seem to get a high on you
My, my sweet honey love

This final version featured Jagger on vocals, Stones producer Jimmy Miller on drums instead of Watts, and Mick Taylor on electric guitar and bass guitar.

I liked Shine a Light. I played bass on that. There are quite a few things I played bass on. I used the band's Fender Jazz bass for these because Bill wasn't there; he was late, and nobody bothered to wait. That used to happen a lot, actually. I don't mean that Bill was late a lot; we didn't always get there at the same time. If we felt like playing, we would.

— Mick Taylor, 1979

According to Wyman, he played bass on the song and Taylor was erroneously credited with playing bass, having pointed out the error via an advance copy of the album. He also says that he played bass on more tracks than was specified in the album's credits and that Jagger had gotten the credits wrong. Also performing on the song are back-up singers Clydie King, Joe Greene, Venetta Fields and Jesse Kirkland. Billy Preston performs both piano and organ for the recording and had a distinct influence on Jagger and the song while mixing the album at Los Angeles' Sunset Sound Studios. Jagger claims visits to Preston's local church inspired the gospel influences apparent on the final recording while Richards was absent from these sessions. An alternative version without the backing singers and with a different guitar solo by Mick Taylor was released on bootlegs.

== Reception ==
Classic Rock History critic Matthew Pollard rated "Shine a Light" as the Rolling Stones' 2nd best deep cut, saying that "it rings properly like any traditional gospel composition but with a creamy additive of the Stones’ attitude" and that it is "a fitting tribute and farewell to [Jones]."

== Legal problems ==
After the release of Exile on Main St., Allen Klein sued the Rolling Stones for breach of settlement because "Shine a Light" and four other songs on the album were composed while Jagger and Richards were under contract with his company, ABKCO. ABKCO acquired publishing rights to the songs, giving it a share of the royalties from Exile on Main St., and was able to publish another album of previously released Rolling Stones songs, More Hot Rocks (Big Hits & Fazed Cookies).

== Live ==
"Shine a Light" first entered the Stones' setlist during the 1995 leg of the Voodoo Lounge Tour, and live performances of the song from this period were included on the 1995 album Stripped and its 2016 edition Totally Stripped. The Stones played the song occasionally during their Bridges to Babylon Tour (1997–98) and A Bigger Bang Tour (2005-07). The song gave its name to a 2008 Martin Scorsese film chronicling the Stones' Beacon Theatre performances on the latter tour, and the 29 October 2006 performance is included on the soundtrack album. The most recent performance occurred during the band's No Filter tour in 2017, which was later released on the Honk compilation.

== Legacy ==
Retrospectively, Jagger considered "Shine a Light" a favourite song after the band recorded it for Stripped. The song's vocal melody was an influence on Oasis's song "Live Forever", released in 1994. The song has been covered multiple times in concert by Phish, the first time on 31 October 2009 when the band covered the entirety of Exile on Main Street as part of its musical costume. Elton John also performed the song live for 'Peace One Day' on 21 September 2012, and is a well-known Stones fan. The song was also featured in the 3rd episode season 6 of Californication "Dead Rockstars" performed by Tim Minchin (aka Atticus Fetch in the series) The song is played in its entirety beginning in the last scenes and through the credits in ‘Ray Donovan, the Movie. It is also played during the credits of the Prime Video series, "Daisy Jones and the Six," released in 2023, and "Jackass: Best and Last," released in 2026.
