= Happy (Rolling Stones song) =

Single by the Rolling Stones

from the album Exile on Main St.
- B-side: "All Down the Line"
- Released: June 1972
- Recorded: July–November 1971
- Studio: Villa Nellcôte, France
- Genre: Rock and roll
- Length: 3:05
- Label: Rolling Stones
- Songwriter: Jagger/Richards
- Producer: Jimmy Miller

The Rolling Stones singles chronology
"Tumbling Dice" (1972)	"Happy" (1972)	"Angie" (1973)

Alternative cover
- Japanese picture sleeve for "Happy"

"Happy" is a song by the English rock band the Rolling Stones from their 1972 album Exile on Main St. Featuring guitarist Keith Richards on lead vocals, it was released as the second single from the album in June 1972, entering the Billboard Hot 100 at No. 69 on 15 July 1972 and reached No. 22 on 19 August 1972.

== Overview ==
Credited to Jagger/Richards, "Happy" was written primarily by Keith Richards during the summer of 1971, at the villa Nellcôte in southern France, over the course of a single afternoon. According to Richards, "We did that in an afternoon, in only four hours, cut and done. At noon it had never existed. At four o'clock it was on tape." The basic tracks were recorded in the Nellcôte basement, using the Rolling Stones Mobile Studio, with Richards on bass, guitar and vocals, producer Jimmy Miller on drums, and saxophonist Bobby Keys on maracas.

"Happy" was the only single by the band to chart on the Hot 100 on which Richards sang lead.

In 1972, Record World called "Happy", along with the B-side of "All Down the Line" as, "the Stones at their best."

== In concert ==
Since 1972, Richards has often sung "Happy" in concert and it has become one of his signature tunes. Performances of the song through 1978 also featured Jagger's vocals during the chorus.

Concert renditions of the song appear on the albums Love You Live and Live Licks; the studio track has been released on the compilation albums Made in the Shade, Forty Licks and GRRR! The song also features on concert films and DVD box sets: Ladies and Gentlemen: The Rolling Stones (1974), Live at the Tokyo Dome (1990), Stones at the Max (1992), Four Flicks (2004), The Biggest Bang (2007), Some Girls: Live in Texas '78 (2011), Sweet Summer Sun: Hyde Park Live (2013) and L.A. Forum – Live In 1975 (2014).

== Personnel ==
According to Exile on Main St. liner notes and authors Philippe Margotin and Jean-Michel Guesdon:

The Rolling Stones

- Keith Richards – lead vocals, backing vocals, lead and rhythm guitars, bass
- Mick Jagger – backing vocals

Additional musicians

- Bobby Keys – baritone saxophone, tambourine
- Jim Price – trumpet, trombone
- Jimmy Miller – drums

== See also ==
- The Rolling Stones discography
