= Nellcôte =

Villa Nellcôte
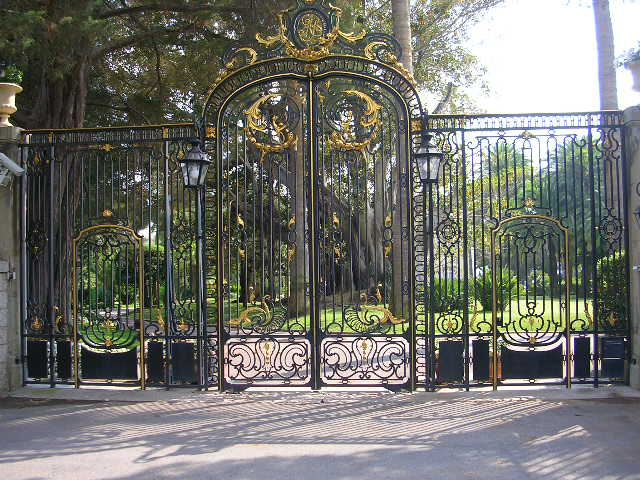
- The gates of the Villa Nellcôte in August 2008
- Former names: Château Amicitia
- Alternative names: Nellcôte

General information
- Type: Private residence
- Location: Villefranche-sur-Mer, France, 10 Avenue Louise Bordes; 06230, Villefranche-sur-Mer
- Coordinates: 43.702617°N 7.322115°E
- Completed: 1899

Villa Nellcôte (often referred to as Nellcôte) is a 16-room mansion built during the Belle Époque on a headland above the sea at Villefranche-sur-Mer on the Côte d'Azur in Southern France. Among rock music fans, it is known as the recording location of the 1972 album Exile on Main St. by the English band the Rolling Stones.

== History ==
In the late 1890s, a former banker, Eugene Thomas, built the imposing villa fronted with marble Ionic columns. Originally it bore the name of Château Amicitia. In 1919, the villa, since renamed Villa Nellcôte, was acquired by the Bordes family, famous shipowners specialising in the transport of sodium nitrate between Chile and France.

The Villa Nellcôte was leased from April 1971 to October 1971 by Keith Richards, guitarist of the Rolling Stones. Recording sessions for the band's critically acclaimed 1972 album Exile on Main St. took place in its basement. Richards lived in the house only until late August 1971, after which he left France due to legal problems. In October 1973, a court in Nice imposed a one-year suspended sentence and a 5,000 franc fine on Richards for trafficking cannabis, and banned him from entering France for two years.

Richards claimed that during the Nazi occupation of France in the early 1940s, Villa Nellcôte had served as the headquarters of the local Gestapo, with the floor vents in the basement reportedly being decorated with swastikas. However, this story is almost certainly false. The swastika was a common motif in Belle Époque designs. The Germans were not in the south of France long enough. From June 1940 to September 1943, Villefranche-sur-Mer was under first Vichy French, then under Fascist Italian control. The Nazi occupation began only after that — and they left again in August 1944. With the war turning against them and an invasion expected on the Côte d'Azur, it seems unlikely that the Germans would have spent those 11 months getting local foundries to make custom cast-iron ventilation grates adorned with a swastika motif. Nor is there any record of a Gestapo HQ in Villefranche-sur-Mer.

It is presently owned by a Russian national, who purchased it for 100 million euros ($128 million) in 2005.

While the house is not visible from the street, it can be seen from the water.
