= Jimmy Miller =

American record producer and musician (1942–1994)

- Born: March 23, 1942; New York City, U.S.
- Died: October 22, 1994 (aged 52); Denver, Colorado, U.S.
- Occupations: Record producer; musician
- Spouses: Gayle Shepherd (divorced); Geri Miller (m. 1970–1991)
- Children: 2
- Father: Bill Miller
- Family: Judith Miller (half-sister)

Jimmy Miller (March 23, 1942 – October 22, 1994) was an American record producer and musician. While he produced albums for dozens of different bands and artists, he is known primarily for his work with several key musical acts of the 1960s and 1970s.

Miller rose to prominence working with the various bands of vocalist Steve Winwood (including Spencer Davis Group, Traffic, and Blind Faith). His best acclaimed work was his late 1960s-early 1970s work with the Rolling Stones for whom he produced a string of singles and albums that rank among the most critically and financially successful works of the band's career: Beggars Banquet (1968), Let It Bleed (1969), Sticky Fingers (1971), Exile on Main St. (1972) and Goats Head Soup (1973). In the late 1970s, he began working with Motörhead and continued to produce until his death in 1994.

In 2026, Miller was posthumously inducted into the Rock and Roll Hall of Fame.

== Early life ==
Miller was born in Brooklyn, New York City, the son of Anne Wingate and Bill Miller. Bill was a Las Vegas entertainment director who had booked Elvis Presley into the International Hotel for his 1969 return to live performance. Miller's interest in music started at age eight, playing drums and singing.

Miller's half-sister was Judith Miller, a Pulitzer Prize-winning journalist for The New York Times who was imprisoned for not revealing her sources in the Plame–Wilson CIA affair.

== Career ==
Miller first trained and worked as the protege of Stanley Borden (RKO, Artia, After Hours Unique). Borden, the original backer of Island Records, suggested Miller to Chris Blackwell, who brought him to the United Kingdom.

Miller's first job in the UK was to remix a single from the Spencer Davis Group which had done well in the UK charts, "Gimme Some Lovin'". Blackwell recalled that Miller introduced "a kind of wild magic" and "turns up the heat, threatens some kind of chaos", which resulted in "a new sound." Miller's remix entered the US top ten and broke the band in the country. He then co-wrote its follow-up "I'm A Man" with the band's singer-keyboardist, Steve Winwood.

After Winwood left the band in 1967, Miller continued to work with Winwood by producing Winwood's band Traffic as well as the sole album by the Eric Clapton–Winwood supergroup Blind Faith. During this period, Miller also produced the UK Number 1 single for The Move, "Blackberry Way", the first two albums by Spooky Tooth and co-produced (with Delaney Bramlett) the hit Delaney & Bonnie album from 1969, On Tour with Eric Clapton.

In addition to producing five of their albums, Miller notably added instrumentation to several songs by the Rolling Stones. His contributions include the opening cowbell on "Honky Tonk Women" and drumming on "You Can't Always Get What You Want," "Tumbling Dice," "Happy," and "Shine a Light."

In the late 70s, Miller collaborated with Motörhead and produced two of their albums, Overkill and Bomber. In 1983, Miller produced Johnny Thunders's In Cold Blood. In 1991, Miller helped produce Primal Scream's breakthrough album Screamadelica. Miller also produced three tracks for the Wedding Present's 1992 compilation Hit Parade 2.

== Personal life ==
Miller's marriage to Gayle Shepherd, a member of the singing group the Shepherd Sisters, produced a daughter, singer Deena. With his second wife Geraldine, he had a son, Michael, who died at the age of 32. Through Geraldine, Jimmy Miller had a stepson, Steven Miller, a news photographer who spent 25 years working for The New York Times. Geraldine died of breast cancer in 1991.

Miller was a user of hard drugs. He died of liver failure in Denver, Colorado, at the age of 52.

== Discography ==
Year	Artist	Album details
1967	Traffic	Mr. Fantasy
1968	Spooky Tooth	It's All About
1968	Traffic	Traffic
1968	The Rolling Stones	Beggars Banquet
1969	Spooky Tooth	Spooky Two
1969	Traffic	Last Exit
1969	The Rolling Stones	Let It Bleed
1969	Blind Faith	Blind Faith
1970	Delaney & Bonnie & Friends	On Tour with Eric Clapton
1970	Ginger Baker's Air Force	Ginger Baker's Air Force
1970	Sky	Don't Hold Back
1970	Sky	Sailor's Delight
1971	The Rolling Stones	Sticky Fingers
1972	The Rolling Stones	Exile on Main St.
1972	Kracker	La Familia
1972	Bobby Whitlock	Raw Velvet
1973	The Rolling Stones	Goats Head Soup
1973	Kracker	Kracker Brand
1974	Locomotiv GT	Locomotiv GT
1979	Trapeze	Hold On
1979	Motörhead	Overkill
1979	Motörhead	Bomber
1980	Plasmatics	New Hope for the Wretched
1983	Johnny Thunders	In Cold Blood
1991	Primal Scream	Screamadelica
