= Live: In the Red =

Live album by Pussy Galore
- Released: February 16, 1998
- Recorded: August 5, 1989
- Studio: CBGB's, NYC
- Genre: Noise rock, punk blues
- Length: 43:08
- Label: In the Red
- Producer: Pussy Galore

Pussy Galore chronology
Corpse Love: The First Year (1992)	Live: In the Red (1998)

Professional ratings
Review scores
Source	Rating
Allmusic	3/5 stars

Live: In the Red is a live performance album by American noise rock band Pussy Galore, released on February 16, 1998 by in the Red Recordings.

== Track listing ==
All tracks are written by Jon Spencer.

No.	Title	Length
1.	"Nothing Can Bring Me Down"	1:39
2.	"Adolescent Wet Dream"	1:23
3.	"Sweet Little Hi-Fi"	2:36
4.	"Understand Me"	2:25
5.	"Pig Sweat"	1:58
6.	"1 Hour Later"	2:37
7.	"Dead Meat"	2:05
8.	"SM 57"	2:39
9.	"DWDA"	0:31
10.	"Wretch"	1:53
11.	"Kicked Out"	1:17
12.	"Evil Eye"	3:21
13.	"New Breed"	1:49
14.	"Undertaker"	2:22
15.	"Dick Johnson"	2:09
16.	"Hang On"	6:46
17.	"Kill Yourself"	3:06
18.	"Alright"	2:32

== Personnel ==
Adapted from the Live: In the Red liner notes.

Pussy Galore

- Bob Bert – drums
- Neil Hagerty – electric guitar, vocals
- Jon Spencer – lead vocals, electric guitar, mixing
- Kurt Wolf – electric guitar

Production and additional personnel

- Peter Arsenault – recording
- Michael Lavine – photography
- Pussy Galore – production
- Greg Talenfeld – mixing

== Release history ==
Region	Date	Label	Format	Catalog
United States	1998	In the Red	CD, LP	ITR 050
