= 1 Yr Live =

Live album by Pussy Galore
- Released: 1986
- Genre: Noise rock, punk blues
- Length: 62:52
- Label: Shove

Pussy Galore chronology
Exile on Main St (1986)	1 Yr Live (1986)	Pussy Gold 5000 (1987)

Professional ratings
Review scores
Source	Rating
Allmusic	1.5/5 stars

1 Yr Live is a live performance album by American noise rock band Pussy Galore, released in 1986 by Shove Records.

== Track listing ==
All tracks are written by Jon Spencer, except where noted.

Side one
No.	Title	Writer(s)	Length
1.	"HC Rebellion" (instrumental version)		1:46
2.	"Spin Out"	Cafritz, Spencer	1:30
3.	"Fuck You, Man"	Cafritz	2:00
4.	"Constant Pain"		0:41
5.	"Get Out"		2:11
6.	"Teen Pussy Power"		2:21
7.	"You Look Like a Jew"		1:59
8.	"Kill Yourself"		2:41
9.	"Spit 'n' Shit"		6:30
10.	"Die Bitch"		2:06
11.	"Alright"		2:10
12.	"Get Off of My Cloud"	Jagger, Richards	1:56
13.	"HC Rebellion"		3:36

Side two
No.	Title	Writer(s)	Length
1.	"[untitled]"		2:34
2.	"Pretty Fuck Look"		1:19
3.	"New Breed"		1:55
4.	"European Son"	Reed, Cale, Morrison, Tucker	4:56
5.	"Cunt Tease"	Ludd	1:45
6.	"[untitled]"		5:58
7.	"Get Out"		2:09
8.	"Asshole"		2:18
9.	"Just Wanna Die"		1:16
10.	"Constant Pain"		2:18
11.	"No Count"	Wagner	4:57

== Personnel ==
Pussy Galore

- Bob Bert – drums, percussion
- Julie Cafritz – electric guitar, vocals
- Neil Hagerty – electric guitar, vocals
- Cristina Martinez – electric guitar, vocals
- Jon Spencer – lead vocals, electric guitar

== Release history ==
Region	Date	Label	Format	Catalog
United States	1986	Shove	CS	SHOV 6
