= Corpse Love: The First Year =

Compilation album by Pussy Galore
- Released: February 14, 1992
- Recorded: October 1985–September 10, 1986
- Genre: Noise rock, punk blues
- Length: 78:05
- Label: Caroline
- Producer: Pussy Galore

Pussy Galore chronology
Historia de la Musica Rock (1990)	Corpse Love: The First Year (1992)	Live: In the Red (1998)

Professional ratings
Review scores
Source	Rating
Allmusic	4.5/5 stars

Corpse Love: The First Year is an anthology by American noise rock band Pussy Galore, released on February 14, 1992 by Caroline Records. It comprises the band's first three EPs with several tracks from Exile on Main St and unreleased songs.

== Track listing ==
No.	Title	Writer(s)	Length
1.	"Die Bitch" (from Feel Good About Your Body)	Spencer	2:46
2.	"HC Rebellion" (from Feel Good About Your Body)	Spencer	2:50
3.	"Constant Pain" (from Feel Good About Your Body)	Spencer	1:54
4.	"Car Fantasy" (from Feel Good About Your Body)	Spencer	4:00
5.	"Fuck You, Man" (from Oven Bait)	Cafritz	5:14
6.	"No Count (Solo)"	Wagner	0:31
7.	"Why Would I Say It to You"	Ludd	2:39
8.	"Groovy Phone"	Spencer	4:19
9.	"Shit Rain"	Pussy Galore	2:48
10.	"Don't Give a Fuck About You"	Spencer	2:47
11.	"Soundcheck"		1:13
12.	"D.M.P."	Pussy Galore	2:13
13.	"Teen Pussy Power" (from Groovy Hate Fuck)	Spencer	2:16
14.	"You Look Like a Jew" (from Groovy Hate Fuck)	Spencer	1:44
15.	"Cunt Tease" (from Groovy Hate Fuck)	Ludd	1:52
16.	"Just Wanna Die" (from Groovy Hate Fuck)	Spencer	2:03
17.	"Dead Meat" (from Groovy Hate Fuck)	Spencer	2:27
18.	"Kill Yourself" (from Groovy Hate Fuck)	Spencer	3:01
19.	"Asshole" (from Groovy Hate Fuck)	Spencer	2:42
20.	"Spit 'n' Shit" (from Groovy Hate Fuck)	Spencer	3:56
21.	"Turd on the Run" (from Exile on Main St)	Jagger, Richards	2:42
22.	"Ventilator Blues" (from Exile on Main St)	Jagger, Richards, Taylor	3:56
23.	"I Just Want to See His Face" (from Exile on Main St)	Jagger, Richards	4:01
24.	"Let It Loose" (from Exile on Main St)	Jagger, Richards	4:09
25.	"Pretty Fuck Look" (from Pussy Gold 5000)	Spencer	1:20
26.	"Spin Out" (from Pussy Gold 5000)	Cafritz, Spencer	1:29
27.	"Walk" (from Pussy Gold 5000)	Hagerty	5:04
28.	"Get Out" (from Pussy Gold 5000)	Spencer	2:10

== Release history ==
Region	Date	Label	Format	Catalog
United States	1992	Caroline	CD	CAROL 1706
