= Cold Hands =

Studio album by Boss Hog
- Released: December 2, 1990
- Recorded: 1990
- Studios: Soundscape (New York City) (Note: Tracks 1–3, 5–9); Steve Albini's place (Chicago) (Note: Track 4)
- Genres: Punk rock; grunge; garage rock; noise rock; punk blues
- Length: 28:51
- Label: Amphetamine Reptile

Boss Hog chronology
Drinkin', Lechin' & Lyin' (1989)	Cold Hands (1990)	Action Box (1991)

Cold Hands is the debut studio album by American rock band Boss Hog, released on December 2, 1990, through Amphetamine Reptile Records. The band recorded the album at Soundscape in New York City and Steve Albini's place in Chicago with their revolving-door "All-Stars" lineup, led by vocalist Cristina Martinez and guitarist and vocalist Jon Spencer and featuring guitarists Kurt Wolf, Jerry Teel, bassist Pete Shore and drummer Charlie Ondras. It is a punk rock, grunge, garage rock, noise rock and punk blues album incorporating blues and industrial influences whilst experimenting with samples, reversed tape loops, and noise.

Cold Hands received mixed reviews from critics, who commented on its sound and style; whilst some considered it an improvement over Martinez's and Spencer's previous band Pussy Galore and Boss Hog's debut extended play (EP) Drinkin' Lechin' & Lyin' (1989), others criticized its pacing and considered it self-indulgent. Boss Hog embarked on a tour of Europe in support of the album in early 1991.

== Background and release ==
Cristina Martinez formed Boss Hog in 1989, two years after her acrimonious departure from Pussy Galore and a stint playing guitar for The Honeymoon Killers. She initially planned on singing and playing guitar in the band, but decided to recruit Pussy Galore leader and her husband Jon Spencer as she felt she was too uncoordinated. After settling on a revolving-door "All-Stars" lineup with guitarists Kurt Wolf and Jerry Teel and drummer Charlie Ondras, Boss Hog released their debut extended play Drinkin' Lechin' & Lyin' (1989) through Amphetamine Reptile Records. With the addition of bassist Pete Shore, Boss Hog recorded Cold Hands in 1990 at Soundscape in New York City with engineers Peter Arsenaut and Ed Bair, except for "Red Bull", which was recorded and mixed in Chicago with Steve Albini. The album was released through Amphetamine Reptle on December 2, 1990. Its cover, featuring Martinez in a nude pose, was inspired by an Halston advertisement featuring Cindy Crawford. To promote the album, Boss Hog embarked on a tour of Europe that commenced in February 1991 as a five-piece, featuring Wolf and bassist Jens Jurgensen. The album has never been released on Spotify.

== Composition ==
Cold Hands is a punk rock, grunge, garage rock, noise rock, and punk blues album that incorporates blues and industrial influences. Its songs emphasize guitars and "beats" over vocals, and experiment with samples, reversed tape loops, and noise. Spencer viewed the album as being "more woolly and experimental" than Drinkin', Lechin' & Lyin'. Ian Watson of Melody Maker described its overall mood as "desperate yet defiant", and its vocals "babbl[ing] insanely"; Metal Hammer likened Martinez to a "demonically possessed fish-wife" with her growls. In an interview with No Trend Press, Martinez said her lyrics were mainly about "hate and love". (Note: Quotes are translated from the original text: "hass und liebe") Some of Cold Hands' song titles were derived from men Boss Hog knew including Shore and Matador Records co-president Gerard Cosloy; Martinez said they were originally planned to be working titles, but kept them as she thought it was funny and subsequently incorporated their names into the songs' lyrics.

Martinez said that "Gerard" and "Eddy" are "songs about men that I have ruined". (Note: Quotes are translated from the original text: "Songs über Männer sind, die ich zugrunde gerichtet habe") Leo Finlay of Sounds described the former as a "a mess of filthy blues" with "rolling" lead guitar and "frustrated" vocals from Spencer. Sharon O'Connell of Melody Maker cited the latter as showcasing Boss Hog's "speed-lurch style" with its "slow motion, ground shaking crunch". "Bug Purr" is an instrumental track that uses a cat purr sample as a bassline interspersed with wandering vocals and minimalist guitars lines. The industrial track "Red Bull" features a Roland drum machine from Albini's band Big Black and a guest appearance from guitarist Santiago Durango, whilst "Go Wrong" ends with "screaming" saxophone by Kurt Hoffman. "Pete Shore" sees Martinez yell over "searing" guitars. Dan McMinn of Spin likened "Domestic" to a "minimalist Tom Waits"; a writer for CMJ New Music Report also stated that it "whispers tails of delight [sic]". "Duchess" and "Pop Catastrophe" are built around live-sounding, "unfussy" arrangements, with the former being a slow-paced "art-blues" song with a "swamp-funk" riff that drew comparisons with Motown, Jerry Lee Lewis, and the Plastic Ono Band.

== Critical reception ==
Professional ratings
Review scores
Source	Rating
AllMusic	4/5 stars
The Encyclopedia of Popular Music	3/5 stars
Entertainment Weekly	C+
The Great Indie Discography	3/10
Metal Hammer	4/5
MusicHound Rock	2.5/5 stars
Q	3/5 stars
Raw	3/5 stars
Sounds	3.5/5 stars

Cold Hands received mixed reviews from music critics. Dean McFarlane of AllMusic considered the album to be Boss Hog's "masterpiece" and a key work of the New York underground noise rock scene, describing its style as "unprecedented". Watson of Melody Maker believed that regardless of how one perceived Boss Hog, they "could not be accused of [...] being yet another stupid American noise band" and that "there's no denying that [the band] have stumbled upon one hell of a sound". Edwin Pouncey of NME remarked that "What once spat and clawed as Pussy Galore now roars like the full blown exhaust of some greasy biker gang" and that the album "successfully kicks your head round the room to leave you aching for more", whilst Finlay of Sounds viewed the album as providing a "more reliable noise" than Pussy Galore. Sebastien Zabel of Spex praised the album for being more grounded than Pussy Galore's output, though he felt its "many clever individual parts" were obscured by Boss Hog "plastering over" song structures and criticized its first half's "undynamic wallowing in a bath of noise". (Note: Quotes are translated from the original text: "das Songgerust zukleistern und es einige" [...] "undynamische Rumgesuhle im Lärmbad") Bill Wyman of Entertainment Weekly compared the album unfavorably with Big Black and criticized its "paucity" of energy and melody, citing "Eddy" as its sole song with a "discernible guitar riff".

In Rolling Stone, David Fricke described Cold Hands as a "Cuisinart fusion of garage groove, industrial grunge and willful aural sadism". Metal Hammer's Technicolor Twins felt the album would appeal to those who enjoyed "experimental, tuneless, hardcore, weird shit" and that it was "[a]lmost so bad it's kinda good". Jeremy Clarke of Q described the album as "nine painfully slow nuggets of sonic indigestion", whilst Ruta 66's Manolo Torres derided it as "auditory sadomasochism", believing there to be "no other intention than perverse entertainment, the cellular mutilation of rock carried out for the pure pleasure of what happens." (Note: Quotes are translated from the original text: "sadomasoquismo auditivo. No parace haber otra intención que la del entretnimiento perveso, la mutilación celular del rock efectada por el puro placer de probar a ver que pasa.") Deborah Sprague of Trouser Press likened the album to a vanity press book with its "reliance on in-jokes [...] and calculatedly rakish rhythmic stratagems". Colin Larkin of The Encyclopedia of Popular Music felt that, as with Drinkin' Lechin' & Lyin', the band's provocative image failed to live up to its musical style.

== Track listing ==
All tracks are written by Boss Hog.

No.	Title	Length
1.	"Gerard"	2:32
2.	"Eddy"	3:13
3.	"Bug Purr"	2:26
4.	"Red Bull"	3:20
5.	"Go Wrong"	2:54
6.	"Pete Shore"	3:08
7.	"Domestic"	3:12
8.	"Duchess"	5:01
9.	"Pop Catastrophe"	3:00
Total length:		28:51

== Personnel ==
Personnel per liner notes.

The Boss Hog All-Stars
- Cristina Martinez – vocals
- Jon Spencer – vocals, guitar
- Kurt Wolf – guitar
- Pete Shore – bass guitar
- Charlie Ondras – drums
- Jerry Teel – guitar

Guest Stars

- Santiago Durango – guitar (4)
- Kurt Hoffman – saxophone (5)
Production
- Peter Arsenault – engineering, mixing (1–3, 5–9)
- Ed Bair – engineering, mixing (1–3, 5–9)
- Steve Albini – engineering, mixing (4)

Artwork

- Michael Lavine – photography
- Jens Jurgenson – band photography
