= Action Box =

EP by Boss Hog
- Released: 1991
- Recorded: Maida Vale Studio 3, London; Bair Tracks Studio, New York City
- Genre: Indie rock
- Label: Amphetamine Reptile
- Producer: Dale Griffin; Clint Ruin and Boss Hog

Boss Hog chronology
Cold Hands (1990)	Action Box (1991)	Girl + (1993)

Action Box is an EP by punk blues band Boss Hog.

== Track listing ==
All songs written by Boss Hog except where noted.

No.	Title	Writer(s)	Producer(s)	Length
1.	"Big Fish" (Peel Session)		Dale Griffin
2.	"Bunny Fly" (Peel Session)		Dale Griffin
3.	"Black Throat"	The Dark Brothers	Clint Ruin and Boss Hog
4.	"Not Guilty"		Clint Ruin and Boss Hog

== Band members ==
- Cristina Martinez
- Jon Spencer
- Charlie Ondras
- Kurt Wolf
- Jens Jurgensen

== Additional personnel ==
- Simon Askew and Dave McCarthy – engineering on "Big Fish" and "Bunny Fly"
- JG Thirlwell, Bob Bert & Charlie Ondras – guest vocals on "Black Throat" and "Not Guilty"
