= Sing Sing (1984–1994) =

Studio album by The Honeymoon Killers
- Released: January 17, 1997
- Recorded: Various: Bair Tracks; (New York City, NY); Fun City; (New York City, NY); Noise New York; (New York City, NY)
- Genre: Noise rock, punk blues
- Length: 135:55
- Label: Sympathy for the Record Industry
- Producer: The Honeymoon Killers

The Honeymoon Killers chronology
Hung Far Low (1991)	Sing Sing (1984–1994) (1997)

Professional ratings
Review scores
Source	Rating
Allmusic	4.5/5 stars

Sing Sing (1984–1994) is a compilation album by noise rock band The Honeymoon Killers, released on January 14, 1997, by Sympathy for the Record Industry. It compiles various live, rehearsal and living room recordings from the ten years the band was active.

== Track listing ==
Disc one
No.	Title	Writer(s)	Length
1.	"Ubangi Stomp" (Warren Smith cover)	Charles Underwood	4:25
2.	"What Thing?"	Jerry Teel, Lisa Wells	0:49
3.	"Uum Boy, You're My Baby" (Bill Johnson cover)	Bill Johnson	1:03
4.	"Lookin' for Money" (Al Urban cover)	Al Urban	1:54
5.	"Gimme Some Money" (Spinal Tap cover)	Christopher Guest, Michael McKean, Rob Reiner, Harry Shearer	2:10
6.	"Boogie Man Boogie"	Jerry Teel	0:22
7.	"Oh Yeah!"	Sally Edroso, Jerry Teel	1:44
8.	"Dazed and Confused" (Led Zeppelin cover)	Jake Holmes	3:39
9.	"Crazy Daisy"	Sally Edroso, Jerry Teel	2:24
10.	"Basket Case"	Sally Edroso, Jerry Teel, Lisa Wells	3:15
11.	"Godzilla" (Blue Öyster Cult cover)	Buck Dharma	4:44
12.	"Back Door Santa" (Clarence Carter cover)	Clarence Carter, Marcus Daniel	4:06
13.	"Dolly w/a Dick"	Sally Edroso, Cristina Martinez, Jerry Teel, Lisa Wells	2:49
14.	"Puddin' Cups"	Jerry Teel	1:00
15.	"Too Much"	Sally Edroso, Jerry Teel, Lisa Wells	3:27
16.	"Hard Life"	Sally Edroso, Jerry Teel, Lisa Wells	3:01
17.	"Teenage Head" (The Flamin' Groovies cover)	Cyril Jordan, Roy Loney	0:59
18.	"Just Don't Know" (MC5 cover)	Michael Davis, Wayne Kramer, Fred "Sonic" Smith, Dennis Thompson, Rob Tyner	2:54
19.	"The Hawaiian Boogie"	Marcellus Hall, Russell Simins, Jerry Teel, Lisa Wells	2:42
20.	"Reflections on a Plane Trip Home"	Judah Bauer, Jon Spencer, Jerry Teel	3:52
21.	"Who's Driving Your Plane?" (Rolling Stones cover)	Mick Jagger, Keith Richards	3:24
22.	"Subway Rider Blues"	Dan Kroha, Jerry Teel	2:14
23.	"Livin' in a Basement"	Sally Edroso, Russell Simins, Jerry Teel	2:02
24.	"She's Wrong" (Seeds cover)	Sky Saxon	2:25
25.	"Laugh at Me" (Sonny Bono cover)	Sonny Bono	2:48
26.	"Devil Doll"	Sally Edroso, Jerry Teel, Lisa Wells	3:18
27.	"Boogie Man Boogie" (Reprise)	Jerry Teel	1:16

Disc two
No.	Title	Writer(s)	Length
1.	"Love My Life Away" (Gene Pitney cover)	Gene Pitney	2:17
2.	"World Gone Mad"	Hollis Queens, Jerry Teel, Lisa Wells	2:13
3.	"What You Gonna Do?"	traditional arr.	1:24
4.	"Milt's the Man"	Judah Bauer, Josh Curtis, Jerry Teel	1:40
5.	"Honey Do You Love Me?"	Russell Simins, Jerry Teel	1:13
6.	"Stoned Again"	Jack Martin, Jerry Teel	1:32
7.	"Trampled Under Foot" (Led Zeppelin cover)	John Paul Jones, Jimmy Page, Robert Plant	2:48
8.	"One Fine Day"	Jerry Teel	1:39
9.	"Who's Driving Your Plane?" (Rolling Stones cover)	Mick Jagger, Keith Richards	4:42
10.	"Dead Again"	Judah Bauer, Russell Simins, Jerry Teel, Lisa Wells	2:56
11.	"Sound of Flowers"	Jack Martin, Jerry Teel	1:48
12.	"Suppertime Blues"	Marcellus Hall, Billy Loose, Jerry Teel, Lisa Wells	3:08
13.	"Trouble Comin' Every Day" (Frank Zappa & The Mothers of Invention cover)	Frank Zappa	3:07
14.	"All the Time"	Josh Curtis, Jerry Teel	1:30
15.	"Bringin' Me Down"	Josh Curtis, Jerry Teel	2:31
16.	"My Baby's Alright"	Judah Bauer, Josh Curtis, Jerry Teel	2:01
17.	"Thinkin' Man Blues"	Jerry Teel	0:31
18.	"Trouble Blues"	Russell Simins, Jerry Teel, Lisa Wells	4:52
19.	"Honey Doo Jam"	Marcellus Hall, Tony Lee, Jerry Teel, Lisa Wells, Justin Williams	2:59
20.	"Mad Woman Blues"	Russell Simins, Jon Spencer, Jerry Teel, Lisa Wells	1:49
21.	"Devil Jump"	Russell Simins, Jon Spencer, Jerry Teel, Lisa Wells	2:20
22.	"Jonestown Boogie"	Kurt Hoffman, Russell Simins, Jerry Teel, Lisa Wells	3:04
23.	"Quittin' Time"	Russell Simins, Jon Spencer, Jerry Teel, Lisa Wells	3:31
24.	"Joe's House"	Judah Bauer, Jerry Teel	1:39
25.	"Kaw-Liga" (Hank Williams cover)	Fred Rose, Hank Williams	2:38
26.	"Chicken Pickin'"	Russell Simins, Jerry Teel, Lisa Wells	0:35
27.	"Love Is All Around" (Troggs cover)	Reg Presley	3:38
28.	"Come On"	Jerry Teel	3:04

== Personnel ==
Adapted from the Sing Sing (1984-1994) liner notes.

The Honeymoon Killers

- Sally Edroso
- Claire Lawrence-Slater
- Cristina Martinez
- Michael O'Neal
- Russell Simins
- Jon Spencer
- Jerry Teel
- Lisa Wells

Additional musicians

- Judah Bauer
- Josh Curtis
- Dan Kroha
- Marcellus Hall
- Sandra Hamburg
- Kurt Hoffman
- Tony Lee
- John Linnell
- Frank London
- Billy Loose
- Jack Martin
- Hollis Queens
- Justin Williams

== Release history ==
Region	Date	Label	Format	Catalog
United States	1997	Sympathy for the Record Industry	CD	SFTRI 369
