= Whiteout (album) =

Studio album by Boss Hog
- Released: August 21, 1999
- Studios: The Magic Shop (New York City); Greene Street (New York City)
- Genre: Alternative rock
- Label: In the Red
- Producers: Tore Johansson; Andy Gill; Boss Hog

Boss Hog chronology
Boss Hog (1995)	Whiteout (1999)	Brood X (2017)

Professional ratings
Review scores
Source	Rating
AllMusic	4/5 stars
The Encyclopedia of Popular Music	4/5 stars
Entertainment Weekly	B+
Kerrang!	4/5 stars
laut.de	4/5 stars
NME	4/10
Pitchfork	3.1/10
Rolling Stone	3/5 stars
Spin	7/10
Uncut	4/5 stars

Whiteout is the third studio album by alternative rock band Boss Hog.

== Music ==
While previous Boss Hog albums were indelibly stamped with the guitar-heavy aesthetic of Jon Spencer, AllMusic critic Chris Handyside describes Whiteout as fully planned and led by Cristina Martinez. The results are a modernized version of the group's signature sound, "garage punk and new wave girl groups as refracted through a 21st century looking glass." SPIN called it "ingeniously slicked-up garage pop."

== Track listing ==
All songs written by Boss Hog.

No.	Title	Producer(s)	Length
1.	"Whiteout"	Tore Johansson	3:07
2.	"Chocolate"	Tore Johansson	3:05
3.	"Nursery Rhyme"	Tore Johansson	3:57
4.	"Stereolight"	Tore Johansson	4:10
5.	"Fear for You"	Andy Gill	3:30
6.	"Get It While You Wait"	Andy Gill	3:42
7.	"Jaguar"	Andy Gill	2:41
8.	"Itchy & Scratchy"	Andy Gill	3:54
9.	"Trouble"	Boss Hog	2:42
10.	"Monkey"	Boss Hog	1:56

== Personnel ==
Musicians

- Cristina Martinez – lead vocals
- Jon Spencer – guitar, backing vocals
- Jens Jurgensen – bass
- Hollis Queens – drums, backing vocals
- Mark Boyce – keyboard

Production

- Staffan Olofsson – mastering on Tracks 1, 2 and 6–8
- Roger Jonsson – mastering on Tracks 3–5, 9 and 10 at CD-Plant Mastering, Malmö, Sweden
- Tore Johansson – mixing on Tracks 1–4 and "Get It While You Wait" at Tambourine Studios
- Bil Emmons – engineering
- Reto Peter – assistant engineer on Tracks 1–4
- Jim Sclavunos – mixing on "Fear for You"
- Eric Tew & Phil Painson – assistant engineers on "Fear for You" and "Jaguar"
- Eric Tew – assistant engineer on "Get It While You Wait" and "Itchy & Scratchy"
- JG Thirlwell – mixing on "Jaguar"
- Roli Mosimann – mixing on "Itchy & Scratchy" at East Side Sounds
- Juan Garcia – assistant engineer on "Trouble" and "Monkey"
- Cris Moor – photography
- Laura Genninger – art direction
- STUDIO 191 – design
