= Dial 'M' for Motherfucker =

Studio album by Pussy Galore
- Released: April 1989
- Genre: Noise rock; punk blues; garage punk
- Length: 43:45
- Label: Caroline
- Producer: Steve Albini, Jon Spencer

Pussy Galore chronology
Sugarshit Sharp (1988)	Dial 'M' for Motherfucker (1989)	Historia de la Musica Rock (1990)

Professional ratings
Review scores
Source	Rating
AllMusic	3/5 stars
Hi-Fi News & Record Review	B:1/2
New Musical Express	8/10
Record Mirror	4/5 stars
Sounds	3.75/5 stars

Dial 'M' for Motherfucker is the second studio album by the New York City garage punk band Pussy Galore, released in April 1989 by Caroline Records. The song "Kicked Out" is played in an Episode of House, "Games", when Gregory House plays it to annoy Wilson and later to induce a seizure in a patient.

A music video for the song "Dick Johnson" was directed by Jim Spring and Jens Jurgensen.

== Critical reception ==
Nick Robinson, reviewer of British music newspaper Music Week, noticed that the listeners can find "beneath the clattering rhythms and chunky guitars" "some heady melodies that aching to break free" and if they will be able to "endure the racket", they will discover "some rough diamonds that are quite irresistible." Janiss Garza of Cashbox called album "group’s most accessible record to date" and admitted "that this blend of obscure alternative noise and occasional Stones-through-a-fishbowl stylings totally and utterly confuses" but she liked it.

== Track listing ==
All lyrics are written by Jon Spencer, except 10 by Kurt Wolf and 15 by Mark Mothersbaugh and Gerald V. Casale; all music is composed by Pussy Galore, except 15 (Mothersbaugh/Casale).

Side One
No.	Title	Length
1.	"Understand Me"	4:05
2.	"SM 57"	2:04
3.	"Kicked Out"	3:55
4.	"Solo=Sex"	3:02
5.	"Undertaker"	2:32
6.	"DWDA"	4:25
7.	"Dick Johnson"	2:21

Side Two
No.	Title	Length
8.	"1 Hour Later"	2:49
9.	"Eat Me"	2:02
10.	"Waxhead"	2:19
11.	"Wait a Minute"	2:53
12.	"Evil Eye"	3:06
13.	"ADWD #2"	2:30
14.	"Hang On"	5:44

CD bonus tracks (1989 Caroline and Product Inc. releases)
No.	Title	Length
15.	"Penetration of the Centerfold"	2:01
16.	"Handshake"	2:03
17.	"Adolescent Wet Dream"	1:27
18.	"Sweet Little Hi-Fi"	3:04
19.	"Brick"	1:56
20.	"Renegade"	2:51

16-20 are taken from the EP Sugarshit Sharp; 15 was added to reissues of the EP under the correct title, "Penetration in the Centerfold."

== Personnel ==
Adapted from the Dial 'M' for Motherfucker liner notes.

Pussy Galore

- Bob Bert – instruments
- Julie Cafritz – instruments
- Neil Hagerty – instruments
- Jon Spencer – lead vocals, instruments, production, design
- Kurt Wolf – instruments

Production and additional personnel

- Steve Albini – engineering
- Gert-Jan van Avesaath – recording
- Chris Clunn – photography
- Michael Lavine – photography
- Cristina Martinez – design
- Wharton Tiers – engineering

== Charts ==
Chart (1989)	Peak position
UK Indie Chart	4

== Release history ==
Region	Date	Label	Format	Catalog
United States	1989	Caroline	CD, CS, LP	CAROL 1369
United Kingdom	1989	Product Inc.	CD, LP	INC 1
United Kingdom	1998	Mute Records Ltd.	CD, LP	PG 2
United States	1998	Matador	CD, LP	OLE 213
