= Pussy Gold 5000 =

EP by Pussy Galore
- Released: January 1987
- Recorded: September 10, 1986
- Studio: Fun City, NYC
- Genre: Noise rock, punk blues
- Length: 13:31
- Label: Shove
- Producer: Pussy Galore

Pussy Galore chronology
1 Yr Live (1986)	Pussy Gold 5000 (1987)	Right Now! (1987)

Professional ratings
Review scores
Source	Rating
Allmusic	3/5 stars

Pussy Gold 5000 is an EP by American noise rock band Pussy Galore, released in January 1987 by Shove Records.

== Track listing ==
Side one
No.	Title	Writer(s)	Length
1.	"Pretty Fuck Look"	Spencer	1:20
2.	"Spin Out"	Cafritz, Spencer	1:29

Side two
No.	Title	Writer(s)	Length
1.	"Walk"	Hagerty	5:04
2.	"Get Out"	Spencer	2:10
3.	"No Count"	Wagner	3:29

== Personnel ==
Adapted from the Pussy Gold 5000 liner notes.

Pussy Galore

- Bob Bert – drums, percussion
- Julie Cafritz – electric guitar, vocals
- Neil Hagerty – electric guitar, organ, vocals
- Cristina Martinez – electric guitar, organ
- Jon Spencer – lead vocals, electric guitar, percussion

Additional musicians

- John Hammill – drums (B3)
- Tom Raferty – percussion (B3)

Production and additional personnel

- Chris Gehringer – mastering
- Karl Peterson – photography
- Pussy Galore – production
- Wharton Tiers – recording

== Release history ==
Region	Date	Label	Format	Catalog
United States	1987	Shove	LP	SHOV 4
United States	2014	Shove	LP	SHOV 4
