= Drinkin', Lechin' & Lyin' =

EP by Boss Hog
- Released: 1989
- Genre: Indie rock
- Label: Amphetamine Reptile
- Producer: Steve Albini

Boss Hog chronology
Drinkin', Lechin' & Lyin' (1989)	Cold Hands (1990)

Professional ratings
Review scores
Source	Rating
AllMusic	2.5/5 stars
The Encyclopedia of Popular Music	2/5 stars
MusicHound Rock	3/5 stars
NME	8/10

Drinkin', Lechin' & Lyin' is the debut EP by punk blues band Boss Hog. Although out of print since its original release in 1989, Amphetamine Reptile released a vinyl/CD reissue in 2016.

== Track listing ==
No.	Title	Length
1.	"Trigger, Man"
2.	"Pull Out"
3.	"Spanish Fly"
4.	"Dandelion"
5.	"Sugar Bunny"
6.	"Fix Me"

== Personnel ==
- Cristina Martinez
- Jon Spencer
- Charlie Ondras
- Jerry Teel
- Kurt Wolf
