= List of punk blues musicians and bands =

This is a list of notable punk blues musicians and musical groups.

== # ==
- '68 Comeback
- 8 Eyed Spy

== A ==
- Andre Williams

== B ==
- Bantam Rooster
- Band of Skulls
- Scott H. Biram
- Beasts of Bourbon
- Benjamin Booker
- Big John Bates
- The Black Keys
- Bob Log III
- Boss Hog
- Brimstone Howl

== C ==
- Cheater Slicks
- Billy Childish
- The Chrome Cranks
- Clutch
- Compulsive Gamblers
- The Cows
- The Cramps

== D ==
- Deadboy & the Elephantmen
- The Delta 72
- Chris Desjardins
- The Dicks
- Dzukele

== F ==
- The Flesh Eaters

== G ==
- Gallon Drunk
- The Gaslight Anthem
- The Gits
- The Gories
- The Gun Club
- Guitar Wolf

== H ==
- Heavy Trash
- Hillstomp
- Highly Suspect
- Honeymoon in Red
- Rowland S. Howard

== I ==
- The Immortal Lee County Killers
- Inca Babies

== J ==
- Jeffrey Lee Pierce
- The Jim Jones Revue
- Jack White
- Jon Spencer Blues Explosion

== K ==
- Kid Congo Powers
- The Kills
- Knoxville Girls

== L ==
- Laughing Hyenas
- Left Lane Cruiser
- Legendary Shack Shakers
- Bob Log III
- Love Hunters

== M ==
- The Mess Hall
- Modey Lemon
- Mule

== N ==
- New York Dolls
- Napalm Beach

== O ==
- Oblivians

== P ==
- Partibrejkers
- Pussy Galore
- PJ Harvey

== R ==
- Railroad Jerk
- Rollins Band
- Rose Hill Drive

== S ==
- Kim Salmon
- The Scientists
- Jim Sclavunos
- Sister Double Happiness
- Screaming Females
- Social Distortion
- Soledad Brothers

== T ==
- Tav Falco's Panther Burns
- Tex & the Horseheads
- T.S.O.L.

== U ==
- The Upholsterers

== V ==
- The Von Bondies
- Viagra Boys

== W ==
- Wet Nuns
- The White Stripes
