= Turn Me On (album) =

Studio album by The Honeymoon Killers
- Released: 1987
- Recorded: Fun City (New York City, NY)
- Genre: Noise rock, punk blues
- Length: 35:06
- Label: Buy Our Records
- Producer: The Honeymoon Killers, Wharton Tiers

The Honeymoon Killers chronology
Let It Breed (1986)	Turn Me On (1987)	Take It Off! (1988)

Turn Me On is the fourth studio album by noise rock band The Honeymoon Killers, released in 1987 by Buy Our Records.

== Release and reception ==
Professional ratings
Review scores
Source	Rating
Allmusic	3/5 stars

Kathleen C. Fennessy of allmusic, seeing Turn Me On as an improvement over the band's previous album, gave the album three out of five stars Critics of the Trouser Press lauded the band's music for "demonstrat[ing] abundant junk-cinema wit" and "show[ing] continued development and structural strength."

== Track listing ==
All tracks are written by Jerry Teel, except where noted

Side one
No.	Title	Length
1.	"Dolly w/a Dick"	2:50
2.	"Choppin' Mall"	2:44
3.	"Flophausen"	2:43
4.	"You Thrill Me"	4:37
5.	"Dazed 'N' Hazey"	2:20

Side two
No.	Title	Length
1.	"Fingerlickin' Spring Chicken"	3:26
2.	"Das Dum Fuck"	4:45
3.	"Hot Wad of Clay"	5:21
4.	"Octopussy"	2:37

== Personnel ==
Adapted from the Turn Me On liner notes.

The Honeymoon Killers

- Sally Edroso – drums, vocals
- Cristina Martinez – electric guitar, vocals
- Jerry Teel – electric guitar, vocals, cover art, illustrations
- Lisa Wells – bass guitar, vocals

Production and additional personnel

- Chris Gehringer – mastering
- The Honeymoon Killers – production
- Michael Lavine – photography
- Wharton Tiers – engineering

== Release history ==
Region	Date	Label	Format	Catalog
United States	1987	Buy Our Records	CS, LP	BOR-12-015
