= Sugarshit Sharp =

EP by Pussy Galore
- Released: October 31, 1988
- Genre: Noise rock, punk blues
- Length: 18:06
- Label: Caroline (original US release); Product Inc. (original UK release); Matador (1998 US reissue); Mute (1998 UK reissue); Bandai Music (1998 Japanese reissue)
- Producer: Pussy Galore

Pussy Galore chronology
Maximum Penetration (1988)	Sugarshit Sharp (1988)	Dial 'M' for Motherfucker (1989)

Professional ratings
Review scores
Source	Rating
AllMusic	4.5/5 stars
New Musical Express	8/10 stars

Sugarshit Sharp is the fourth EP by the American noise rock band Pussy Galore, released in October 31, 1988 by Caroline Records. The cover is a modification of Einstürzende Neubauten's logo.

== Track listing ==
All tracks are written by Jon Spencer, except "Yü-Gung" by Einstürzende Neubauten and "Penetration in the Centerfold" by Devo.

Side one
No.	Title	Length
1.	"Yü-Gung"	4:46
2.	"Penetration in the Centerfold" (bonus track on 1998 re-release)	2:01

Side two
No.	Title	Length
1.	"Handshake"	2:03
2.	"Adolescent Wet Dream"	1:27
3.	"Sweet Little Hi-Fi"	3:03
4.	"Brick"	1:55
5.	"Renegade!"	2:51

== Accolades ==
Year	Publication	Country	Accolade	Rank
1988	The Village Voice	United States	"Albums of the Year (EPs)"	2
"*" denotes an unordered list.

== Personnel ==
Adapted from the Sugarshit Sharp liner notes.

Pussy Galore

- Bob Bert – drums, percussion
- Julie Cafritz – electric guitar, vocals
- Jon Spencer – lead vocals, electric guitar
- Kurt Wolf – electric guitar

Production and additional personnel

- Chris Gehringer – mastering
- Pussy Galore – production
- Michael Lavine – photography

== Charts ==
Chart (1988)	Peak position
UK Indie Chart	10

== Release history ==
Region	Date	Label	Format	Catalog
United States	1988	Caroline	LP	CAROL 1364
United Kingdom	1988	Product Inc.	LP	MPROD 15
United Kingdom	1998	Mute Records Ltd.	CD, LP	PGEP 1
United States	1998	Matador	CD, LP	OLE 293
United States	1998	Bandai Music	CD	APCY-8456
