= Let It Breed =

Studio album by The Honeymoon Killers
- Released: 1986
- Recorded: Various: CBGB's; (New York City, NY); Noise New York; (New York City, NY)
- Genre: Noise rock, punk blues
- Length: 37:44
- Label: Fur
- Producer: The Honeymoon Killers, Kramer, Steve McAllister

The Honeymoon Killers chronology
Love American Style (1985)	Let It Breed (1986)	Turn Me On (1987)

Let It Breed is the third studio album by noise rock band The Honeymoon Killers, released in 1986 by Fur Records.

== Release and reception ==
Professional ratings
Review scores
Source	Rating
Allmusic	2.5/5 stars

Kathleen C. Fennessy of allmusic gave the album two and a half out of five stars, saying the band sounded like "the Cramps without the rockabilly or Pussy Galore without the metallic drum kit." Critics of the Trouser Press said the band successfully reduces the "musical insanity a tad without giving up any of their intensity."

== Track listing ==
All tracks are written by Jerry Teel, except where noted

Side one
No.	Title	Length
1.	"Power Man"	3:52
2.	"Injun Joe"	2:41
3.	"Dr. Pain"	2:38
4.	"Rich 'N' Famous"	4:54
5.	"Dip It in the Gravey"	2:17
6.	"Day of the Dead"	3:31

Side two
No.	Title	Writer(s)	Length
1.	"Zoo Train"		0:55
2.	"Brain Dead Bird Brain"		4:21
3.	"Face of a Beast"		4:45
4.	"Don Gato"		3:13
5.	"Godzilla" (Blue Öyster Cult cover)	Buck Dharma	4:37

== Personnel ==
Adapted from the Let It Breed liner notes.

The Honeymoon Killers

- Sally Edroso – drums, vocals
- Jerry Teel – electric guitar, harmonica, vocals, cover art, illustrations
- Lisa Wells – bass guitar, vocals

Production and additional personnel

- The Honeymoon Killers – production
- Kramer – engineering
- Steve McAllister – engineering

== Release history ==
Region	Date	Label	Format	Catalog
United States	1986	Fur	LP	FUR 3
