= Take It Off! =

EP by The Honeymoon Killers
- Released: 1988
- Recorded: July 9, 1988
- Studio: Fun City (New York City, NY)
- Genre: Noise rock, punk blues
- Length: 20:07
- Label: Buy Our Records
- Producer: The Honeymoon Killers, Wharton Tiers

The Honeymoon Killers chronology
Turn Me On (1987)	Take It Off! (1988)	'Til Death Do Us Part (1990)

Professional ratings
Review scores
Source	Rating
Allmusic	4/5 stars

Take It Off! is an EP by noise rock band The Honeymoon Killers, released in 1988 by Buy Our Records.

== Track listing ==
All tracks are written by Jerry Teel, except where noted

Side one
No.	Title	Length
1.	"Love Bandit"	3:50
2.	"Hard Life"	3:13
3.	"I'm Glad My Baby's Gone"	3:00

Side two
No.	Title	Length
1.	"Smotherly Love"	3:30
2.	"Too Much!"	3:33
3.	"The Sexorcist"	6:01

CD issue
No.	Title	Length
1.	"Love Bandit"	3:49
2.	"Hard Life"	3:14
3.	"I'm Glad My Baby's Gone"	3:04
4.	"Hanky Panky"	7:20
5.	"Smotherly Love"	3:35
6.	"Too Much!"	3:36
7.	"The Sexorcist"	6:06
8.	"Dazed 'N' Hazey"	2:24

== Personnel ==
Adapted from the Take It Off! liner notes.

The Honeymoon Killers

- Sally Edroso – drums
- Jerry Teel –electric guitar, vocals, cover art, illustrations
- Lisa Wells – bass guitar

Production and additional personnel

- Chris Gehringer – mastering
- The Honeymoon Killers – production
- Michael Lavine – photography
- Wharton Tiers – engineering

== Release history ==
Region	Date	Label	Format	Catalog
United States	1988	Buy Our Records	CS, LP	BOR-12-021
Europe	1989	Buy Our Records	CD, LP	BORE 8901
