= Girl + =

EP by Boss Hog
- Released: May 24, 1993
- Recorded: B.C. Studio, New York City
- Genre: Indie rock
- Label: Amphetamine Reptile
- Producer: Cristina Martinez

Boss Hog chronology
Action Box (1991)	Girl + (1993)	Boss Hog (1995)

Professional ratings
Review scores
Source	Rating
The Boston Phoenix	3.5/4 stars
MusicHound Rock	3.5/5 stars
NME	7/10
Select	3/5 stars

Girl + is an EP by punk blues band Boss Hog.

== Track listing ==
All songs written by Boss Hog and produced by Cristina Martinez. The Japanese version includes the Action Box EP.

No.	Title	Length
1.	"Ruby"
2.	"Some Sara"
3.	"Cream Agent"
4.	"The Black Betty"
5.	"Hustler"

Japan bonus tracks (Action Box EP)
No.	Title	Writer(s)	Producer(s)	Length
6.	"Big Fish" (Peel Session)		Dale Griffin
7.	"Bunny Fly" (Peel Session)		Dale Griffin
8.	"Black Throat"	The Dark Brothers	Clint Ruin and Boss Hog
9.	"Not Guilty"		Clint Ruin and Boss Hog

== Band members ==
- Cristina Martinez
- Jon Spencer
- Jens Jurgensen
- Hollis Queens

== Additional musicians ==
- Kurt Hoffman – saxophone on "Ruby"
- Frank London – trumpet on "Ruby"
