= Historia de la Musica Rock =

Studio album by Pussy Galore
- Released: 1990
- Recorded: 1990
- Studios: Moon-Jem, NYC
- Length: 34:37
- Labels: Caroline (USA); Rough Trade (UK)
- Producer: Pussy Galore

Pussy Galore chronology
Dial 'M' for Motherfucker (1989)	Historia de la Musica Rock (1990)	Corpse Love: The First Year (1992)

Historia de la Musica Rock is the third and final studio album by the American noise rock band Pussy Galore, released in 1990 by Caroline Records in America and Rough Trade Records in England. It was their final studio album.

The album was recorded in two days. The title and cover spoof a series of compilations published in the early 1980s by Orbis records in Spain.

== Critical reception ==
Professional ratings
Review scores
Source	Rating
AllMusic	3/5 stars

The Washington Post wrote: "Pussy Galore wants to play bad and be great. But, as Historia proves yet again, only the first part of that formula can be learned."

== Track listing ==
No.	Title	Writer(s)	Length
1.	"Dedication"	Bert, Hagerty, Spencer	4:03
2.	"Revolution Summer"	Spencer	2:59
3.	"Will You Still Have Me"	Spencer	4:08
4.	"Don't Jones Me"	Hagerty	2:05
5.	"(Do) The Snake"	Bert, Hagerty, Spencer	3:04
6.	"Song at the End of the Side"	Bert, Hagerty, Spencer	2:58
7.	"Ship Comin' In"	Spencer	2:32
8.	"Mono! Man"	Spencer	2:03
9.	"Little Red Rooster (Eric Clapton Must Die)"	Dixon	3:34
10.	"Crawfish"	Weisman, Wise	2:30
11.	"Drop Dead"	Bert, Hagerty, Spencer	4:38

== Personnel ==
Adapted from the Historia de la Musica Rock liner notes.

Pussy Galore

- Bob Bert – drums, percussion
- Neil Hagerty – electric guitar, vocals
- Jon Spencer – lead vocals, electric guitar

Production and additional personnel

- Peter Arsenault – recording, mixing
- Michael Lavine – photography
- Pussy Galore – production, mixing

== Release history ==
Region	Date	Label	Format	Catalog
United States	1990	Caroline	CD, CS, LP	CAROL 1618
United Kingdom	1990	Rough Trade	CD, LP	ROUGH 149
