= Charlie Ondras =

American drummer

Background information
- Born: October 5, 1966
- Died: June 22, 1992 (aged 25)
- Genres: Noise rock
- Occupation: Musician
- Instrument: Drums
- Years active: 1988–1992
- Labels: Amphetamine Reptile; Matador

Charlie Ondras (October 5, 1966 – June 22, 1992) was an American drummer from New York and a founding member of the noise rock band Unsane, formerly Lawn-Chair-Blisters. He also collaborated with Jon Spencer and Cristina Martinez under the name Boss Hog and appeared on the band's first two releases. Ondras died of a heroin overdose while attending the 1992 New Music Seminar in New York.

== Discography ==
Boss Hog

Year	Name	Ref
1989	Drinkin', Lechin' & Lyin'	
1990	Cold Hands	

Unsane

Year	Name	Ref
1991	Unsane	
1992	Singles 89-92	
