= Right Now! (Pussy Galore album) =

Studio album by Pussy Galore
- Released: 1987
- Genre: Noise rock, punk blues
- Length: 33:28
- Label: Caroline
- Producer: Steve Albini, Kramer, Pussy Galore

Pussy Galore chronology
| Pussy Gold 5000 (1987) | Right Now! (1987) | Maximum Penetration (1988) |

Professional ratings
Review scores
| Source | Rating |
|---|---|
| AllMusic | 4/5 stars |
| The Encyclopedia of Popular Music | 3/5 stars |
| The Rolling Stone Album Guide | 2/5 stars |
| Sounds | 5/5 stars |
| Spin Alternative Record Guide | 8/10 |
| The Village Voice | B |

Right Now! is the debut studio album by the American noise rock band Pussy Galore, released in 1987 through Caroline Records.

== Critical reception ==
Trouser Press wrote that the album "brings Pussy Galore into the realm of artistic consideration but reveals them as a fairly bad noise band." The Spin Alternative Record Guide called Right Now! the band's "finest bulldozer ride through the album format."

== Track listing ==
All songs written by Jon Spencer except where noted.

Side One
| No. | Title | Writer(s) | Length |
|---|---|---|---|
| 1. | "Pig Sweat" | | 1:25 |
| 2. | "White Noise" | | 0:36 |
| 3. | "Uptight" | | 1:21 |
| 4. | "Biker-Rock-Loser" | | 1:34 |
| 5. | "Wretch" | | 1:40 |
| 6. | "Rope Legend" | Neil Hagerty | 2:00 |
| 7. | "Fuck You, Man" | Julia Cafritz | 0:36 |
| 8. | "White People" | | 1:06 |
| 9. | "New Breed" | | 1:50 |
| 10. | "Alright" | | 2:00 |

Side Two
| No. | Title | Writer(s) | Length |
|---|---|---|---|
| 1. | "Knock Up" | | 0:54 |
| 2. | "NYC: 1999!" | | 2:06 |
| 3. | "Punch Out" | | 1:51 |
| 4. | "Pussy Stomp" | | 1:48 |
| 5. | "Trash Can Oil Drum" | | 2:09 |
| 6. | "Fix It" | Neil Hagerty | 1:51 |
| 7. | "Really Suck" | | 2:23 |
| 8. | "Rancid" | | 3:35 |
| 9. | "Hell Spawn" | | 2:35 |

== Personnel ==
Adapted from the Right Now! liner notes.

Pussy Galore

- Bob Bert – drums, percussion
- Julie Cafritz – electric guitar, vocals
- Neil Hagerty – electric guitar, vocals
- Jon Spencer – lead vocals, electric guitar

Production and additional personnel

- Chris Gehringer – mastering
- Michael Lavine – photography

== Charts ==
| Chart (1987) | Peak position |
|---|---|
| UK Indie Chart | 17 |

== Release history ==
| Region | Date | Label | Format | Catalog |
|---|---|---|---|---|
| United States | 1987 | Caroline | CS, LP | CAROL 1337 |
| United Kingdom | 1987 | Product Inc. | CD, LP | 33 PROD 19 |
| United Kingdom | 1998 | Mute Records Ltd. | CD, LP | PG 1 |
| United States | 1998 | Matador | CD, LP | OLE 212 |
| United States | 2012 | Shove | LP | SHOV 7 |
