= Love, American Style (disambiguation) =

Love, American Style is an American comedic television anthology.

Love, American Style or Love American Style may also refer to:

- "Love American Style" (Dexter), an episode of the American television series Dexter
- Love American Style, an EP by the Beastie Boys featuring the song "Hey Ladies"
- Love American Style (album), an album by noise rock band The Honeymoon Killers
