= Hung Far Low =

Studio album by The Honeymoon Killers
- Released: 1991
- Recorded: Various: Bair Tracks; (New York City); Fun City; (New York City); Noise New York; (New York City)
- Genre: Noise rock
- Length: 37:48
- Label: Fist Puppet
- Producer: The Honeymoon Killers

The Honeymoon Killers chronology
'Til Death Do Us Part (1990)	Hung Far Low (1991)	Sing Sing (1984-1994) (1997)

Hung Far Low is the fifth and final studio album by noise rock band The Honeymoon Killers, released in 1991 by Fist Puppet Records.

== Release and reception ==
Professional ratings
Review scores
Source	Rating
AllMusic	2.5/5 stars

Todd Kristel of AllMusic criticized the record for feeling too mechanical and lacking entertainment value, concluding that "it is listenable and occasionally even interesting."

== Track listing ==
All tracks are written by Jerry Teel.

No.	Title	Length
1.	"Mad Dog"	3:02
2.	"Kansas City Milkman"	3:43
3.	"Mr. Big Stuff"	1:54
4.	"Vanna White (Goddess of Love)/You Can't Do That"	7:15
5.	"Quittin' Time"	3:31
6.	"Devil's Jump"	2:21
7.	"Tanks a Lot"	2:45
8.	"Fannie Mae"	3:31
9.	"Scootch Says"	1:56
10.	"Something's Wrong"	2:40
11.	"Madwoman Blues"	1:49
12.	"Whole Lotta Crap"	3:21

== Personnel ==
Adapted from the Hung Far Low liner notes.

The Honeymoon Killers

- Russell Simins – drums, bongos, vocals
- Jon Spencer – guitar, trombone
- Jerry Teel – guitar, harmonica, vocals
- Lisa Wells – bass guitar, vocals

Production and additional personnel

- Marcellus Hall – harmonica (10)
- The Honeymoon Killers – production
- Jens Jurgenson – photography

== Release history ==
Region	Date	Label	Format	Catalog
United States	1991	Fist Puppet	CD, LP	FIST 002
