= The Honeymoon Killers from Mars =

Studio album by The Honeymoon Killers
- Released: 1984
- Recorded: Sixth Street Butcher Shop (New York City, NY)
- Genres: Noise rock, punk blues
- Length: 33:01
- Label: Fur

The Honeymoon Killers chronology
The Honeymoon Killers from Mars (1984)	Love American Style (1985)

The Honeymoon Killers from Mars is the debut studio album of noise rock band The Honeymoon Killers, independently released in 1984 by Fur Records.

== Release and reception ==
Critics of the Trouser Press said the record was probably an entertaining collector's item at best, but "miss it, and you'll never get to hear the world's worst version of Bo Diddley's "Who Do You Love?"".

== Track listing ==
All tracks are written by Jerry Teel, except where noted.

Side one
No.	Title	Length
1.	"Honeymoon Killers"	3:39
2.	"Cornbread Fed"	3:11
3.	"I Love to Eat It"	3:01
4.	"Rooms of Doom"	4:20
5.	"Place in France"	1:35

Side two
No.	Title	Writer(s)	Length
1.	"Ubangi Stomp" (Warren Smith cover)	Charles Underwood	4:24
2.	"Cat People"		3:25
3.	"Who Do You Love?" (Bo Diddley cover)	Bo Diddley	4:46
4.	"Shake"		4:42

== Personnel ==
Adapted from The Honeymoon Killers from Mars liner notes.

The Honeymoon Killers

- Claire Lawrence-Slater – drums
- Michael O'Neill – electric guitar
- Jerry Teel – vocals, electric guitar, cover art, illustrations
- Lisa Wells – bass guitar

Production and additional personnel

- Matt Noble – mixing

== Release history ==
Region	Date	Label	Format	Catalog
United States	1984	Fur	LP	FUR 1
