= Brood X (album) =

Studio album by Boss Hog
- Released: March 24, 2017
- Recorded: September 2014 – September 2016
- Studio: Key Club Recording Company (Benton Harbor, Michigan)
- Length: 33:24
- Label: Bronze Rat; In the Red
- Producer: Bill Skibbe

Boss Hog chronology
Brood Star (2016)	Brood X (2017)

Singles from Brood X
- 1. "17" Released: January 4, 2017; 2. "Formula X" Released: January 24, 2017; 3. "Ground Control" Released: March 9, 2017

Brood X is the fourth studio album by American rock band Boss Hog, released on March 24, 2017, through Bronze Rat and In the Red Records. The album was recorded between September 2014 and September 2016 at the Key Club Recording Company in Benton Harbor, Michigan.

== Critical reception ==
Professional ratings
Aggregate scores
Source	Rating
Metacritic	77/100
Review scores
Source	Rating
AllMusic	3.5/5 stars
Financial Times	4/5 stars
God Is in the TV	8/10
Kerrang!	4/5 stars
laut.de	4/5 stars
Louder Than War	7/10
Pitchfork	7.8/10
Record Collector	4/5 stars
Rolling Stone	3.5/5 stars
Slant Magazine	3.5/5 stars

On review aggregator website Metacritic, Brood X holds a score of 77 out of 100, based on reviews from seven critics, which indicates "generally favorable reviews".

== Track listing ==
All tracks are written by Boss Hog.

No.	Title	Length
1.	"Billy"	3:47
2.	"Black Eyes"	3:30
3.	"Ground Control"	2:52
4.	"Shh Shh Shh"	3:39
5.	"Signal"	2:54
6.	"Rodeo Chica"	2:54
7.	"Elevator"	2:49
8.	"Formula X"	3:15
9.	"Sunday Routine"	3:49
10.	"17"	3:54
Total length:		33:24

== Personnel ==
Personnel per liner notes.

The Boss Hog All-Stars
- Cristina Martinez - vocals
- Jon Spencer - guitar
- Jens Jurgensen - bass
- Hollis Queens - drums
- Mickey Finn - keyboards

Additional musicians

- M. Sord - bongos, additional vocals
- Bill Skibbe - additional synthesizer

Production

- Bill Skibbe - production, recording, mixing
- Dave Gardner - mastering

Artwork

- Doerte Fitschen-Rath - creature photographs
- Dan Wonderly - pavement photographs
- Angel Zayas - flyer photograph
- Erin Jang - design
