= 'Til Death Do Us Part (EP) =

EP by The Honeymoon Killers
- Released: 1990
- Genre: Noise rock, punk blues
- Length: 27:00
- Label: King Size

The Honeymoon Killers chronology
Take It Off! (1988)	'Til Death Do Us Part (1990)	Hung Far Low (1991)

'Til Death Do Us Part is an EP by noise rock band The Honeymoon Killers, released in 1990 by King Size Records.

== Track listing ==
All tracks are written by Sally Edroso, Jerry Teel and Lisa Wells

No.	Title	Length
1.	"Baby Blew"	4:15
2.	"Jump"	5:06
3.	"Evil Green"	3:58
4.	"I Can't Wait for Nothing"	3:41
5.	"Head Twister"	4:25
6.	"970-Lick"	5:36

== Personnel ==
Adapted from the 'Til Death Do Us Part liner notes.

The Honeymoon Killers

- Sally Edroso – drums, vocals, bass guitar (4)
- Jerry Teel – electric guitar, vocals, cover art, illustrations
- Lisa Wells – bass guitar, drums (4)

== Release history ==
Region	Date	Label	Format	Catalog
Germany	1990	King Size	CD, LP	KS 0011
Germany	2008	Unsound	LP	UNR 003
