= The Honeymoon Killers (American band) =

American punk rock group

- Origin: New York City, United States
- Genres: Noise rock, punk blues, garage rock, punk rock, blues rock
- Years active: 1983–1994
- Labels: Buy Our Records, Fist Puppet, Fur
- Past members: Sally Edroso; Cristina Martinez; Michael O'Neill; Russell Simins; Claire Lawrence-Slater; Jon Spencer; Jerry Teel; Lisa Wells

The Honeymoon Killers were an American noise rock band from New York City, formed in 1983. Their name is taken from the 1970 crime film The Honeymoon Killers. The Honeymoon Killers' sound is deeply rooted in the blues earning them comparisons to The Cramps, whose music was highly influential to Teel. The nucleus of the band was Jerry Teel and Lisa Wells, with Sally Edroso serving as the longest standing drummer between 1985 and 1990. The group's rotating line-ups would consist of members belonging to like-minded bands such as Pussy Galore, Boss Hog, Ritual Tension and the Jon Spencer Blues Explosion. Their first three albums were independent releases issued by the band's label Fur Records. The group disbanded in 1994, with its leader Jerry Teel forming The Chrome Cranks with drummer Bob Bert and guitarist William Gilmore Weber.

== History ==
Guitarist Jerry Teel and bassist Lisa Wells founded The Honeymoon Killers in the summer of 1983. They were later accompanied by guitarist Michael O'Neill and former Ritual Tension bassist Claire Lawrence-Slater on drums on their 1984 debut album The Honeymoon Killers from Mars, released on the band's own label Fur Records. Drummer Sally Edroso, who became the band's most consistent drummer, joined the band for the release of Love American Style in 1985. Continuing as a trio the band released 1986's Let It Breed, which was recorded with Steve McAllister and composer/producer Mark Kramer. The following year Cristina Martinez, of Pussy Galore and Boss Hog, joined the band as a second guitarist for band's fourth album Turn Me On. The EPs Take It Off! and 'Til Death Do Us Part followed in 1988 and 1990 respectively. 1991's Hung Far Low, the band's first studio album in four years, was recorded with drummer Russell Simins and guitarist Jon Spencer.

The group disbanded in 1994, with its leader Jerry Teel forming The Chrome Cranks with drummer Bob Bert and guitarist William Gilmore Weber. The double-disc retrospective anthology Sing Sing (1984-1994) was released in 1997 by Sympathy for the Record Industry.

== Band members ==
Final line-up

- Jerry Teel – electric guitar and vocals (1983–1994)
- Lisa Wells – bass guitar and vocals (1983–1994)

Former

- Sally Edroso – drums and vocals (1985–1990)
- Cristina Martinez – electric guitar and vocals (1987)
- Michael O'Neill – electric guitar (1984)
- Claire Lawrence-Slater – drums (1984)
- Russell Simins – drums (1991)
- Jon Spencer – electric guitar (1991)

Timeline

== Discography ==
Studio albums

- The Honeymoon Killers from Mars (1984, Fur)
- Love American Style (1985, Fur)
- Let It Breed (1986, Fur)
- Turn Me On (1987, Buy Our)
- Hung Far Low (1991, Fistpuppet)

Compilations

- Sing Sing (1984-1994) (1997, Sympathy for the Record Industry)

EPs

- Take It Off! (1988, Buy Our Records)
- 'Til Death Do Us Part (1990, King Size)

Singles

- Get It Hot/Gettin' Hot (1989, Sub Pop)
- Smells Like Bi-Fi (1991)
- Kansas City Milkman/Nothin' (1991, Insipid Vinyl)
- Live (1991)
- Vanna White (Goddess of Love)/You Can't Do That (1991, Sympathy for the Record Industry)
