= Cold Hands (disambiguation) =

Cold Hands is an album by Boss Hogg

- "Cold Hands", song by Black Lips from album Good Bad Not Evil
- "Cold Hands", song by Maxwell Street Jimmy Davis
- "Cold Hands", song by Suede from The Blue Hour (album)
