= Hollis Queens =

Hollis Queens may refer to:

- Hollis, Queens, New York City, United States
- Hollis Queens, drummer for Boss Hog
