= Feel Good About Your Body =

EP by Pussy Galore
- Released: 1985
- Recorded: October 1985
- Studio: Laundry Room Studio, Arlington, VA
- Genre: Noise rock, punk blues
- Length: 11:29
- Label: Adult Contemporary/Shove
- Producer: Barrett Jones

Pussy Galore chronology
Feel Good About Your Body (1985)	Groovy Hate Fuck (1986)

Professional ratings
Review scores
Source	Rating
Allmusic	3.5/5 stars

Feel Good About Your Body is an EP by American noise rock band Pussy Galore, released in 1985 by Adult Contemporary and Shove Records.

== Track listing ==
All tracks are written by Jon Spencer.

Side one
No.	Title	Length
1.	"Die Bitch"	2:46
2.	"HC Rebellion"	2:50

Side two
No.	Title	Length
1.	"Constant Pain"	1:54
2.	"Car Fantasy"	4:00

== Personnel ==
Adapted from the Feel Good About Your Body liner notes.

Pussy Galore

- Julie Cafritz – electric guitar, backing vocals
- John Hammill – drums, percussion
- Jon Spencer – lead vocals, electric guitar, percussion

Production and additional personnel

- Barrett Jones – production

== Release history ==
Region	Date	Label	Format	Catalog
United States	1985	Shove	LP	SHOV 1
United States	2012	Shove	LP	SHOV 1
