= Maximum Penetration =

Video by Pussy Galore
- Released: 1988
- Genre: Noise rock, punk blues
- Label: Atavistic Video/Jettisoundz

Pussy Galore chronology
Right Now! (1987)	Maximum Penetration (1988)	Sugarshit Sharp (1988)

Professional ratings
Review scores
Source	Rating
Allmusic	3/5 stars

Maximum Penetration is a concert video by American noise rock band Pussy Galore, released in 1988 by Atavistic Video and Jettisoundz.

== Track listing ==
No.	Title	Length
1.	"Watusi Pussy"
2.	"Pig Sweat"
3.	"White Noise"
4.	"Just Wanna Die"
5.	"Nothing Can Bring Me Down"
6.	"Biker Rock Loser"
7.	"Constant Pain"
8.	"Pussy Stomp"
9.	"NYC 1999"
10.	"Cunt Tease"
11.	"When I Get Off"
12.	"Get Out"
13.	"Pretty Fuck Look"
14.	"Trashcan Oildrum"
15.	"Die Bitch"
16.	"Spinout"
17.	"Kill Yourself"
18.	"No Count"
19.	"Fuck You Man/Encore"
20.	"Alright"

== Release history ==
Region	Date	Label	Format	Catalog
United States	1988	Atavistic Video	VHS	ATV 8
United Kingdom	1988	Jettisoundz	VHS	JE192
