= Groovy Hate Fuck =

EP by Pussy Galore
- Released: June 1986
- Recorded: March 25 – March 26, 1986
- Studio: Laundry Room Studio, Arlington, VA
- Genre: Noise rock, punk blues
- Length: 20:01
- Label: Shove
- Producer: Pussy Galore

Pussy Galore chronology
Feel Good About Your Body (1985)	Groovy Hate Fuck (1986)	Exile on Main St (1986)

Professional ratings
Review scores
Source	Rating
Allmusic	4/5 stars

Groovy Hate Fuck is an EP by American noise rock band Pussy Galore, released in June 1986 by Shove Records.

== Accolades ==
Publication	Country	Accolade	Year	Rank
Spin	United States	The 50 Most Essential Punk Records	2001	37

== Track listing ==
All tracks are written by Jon Spencer, except "Cunt Tease" by Buster Ludd.

Side one
No.	Title	Length
1.	"Teen Pussy Power"	2:16
2.	"You Look Like a Jew"	1:44
3.	"Cunt Tease"	1:52
4.	"Just Wanna Die"	2:03

Side two
No.	Title	Length
1.	"Dead Meat"	2:27
2.	"Kill Yourself"	3:01
3.	"Asshole"	2:42
4.	"Spit 'n' Shit"	3:56

== Personnel ==
Adapted from the Groovy Hate Fuck liner notes.

Pussy Galore

- Julie Cafritz – electric guitar, vocals
- Neil Hagerty – electric guitar, vocals
- John Hammill – drums, percussion
- Jon Spencer – lead vocals, electric guitar, percussion

Additional musicians

- Rick Hall – percussion (A2)
- Tom Raferty – percussion (A1)

Production and additional personnel

- Barrett Jones – recording
- Cristina Martinez – photography, tambourine (A1)
- Pussy Galore – production

== Release history ==
Region	Date	Label	Format	Catalog
United States	1986	Shove	LP	SHOV 2
United States	2013	Shove	LP	SHOV 2
