= Boss Hog (album) =

Studio album by Boss Hog
- Released: October 10, 1995
- Genre: Indie rock, blues rock
- Length: 39:17
- Label: DGC
- Producer: Steve Fisk

Boss Hog chronology
Girl + (1991)	Boss Hog (1995)	Whiteout (2000)

Professional ratings
Review scores
Source	Rating
AllMusic	3.5/5 stars
The Encyclopedia of Popular Music	4/5 stars
Kerrang!	4/5 stars
Metal Hammer	4/5 stars
MusicHound Rock	1.5/5 stars
NME	7/10
Rock Hard	9/10
Rolling Stone	3/5 stars
Select	4/5 stars
Vox	8/10

Boss Hog is the second studio album by the hard rock band Boss Hog. It was released in 1995 on Geffen Records.

== Critical reception ==
The Rough Guide to Rock called the album a "raucous smattering of straight-on punk thrashes coupled with some more off-the-wall moments (such as the neo-gothic 'Texas' and the Ike Turner cover, 'I Idolize You.'"

== Track listing ==
All tracks by Boss Hog except where noted.

1. "Winn Coma" – 2:17
2. "Sick" – 3:43
3. "Beehive" – 1:50
4. "Ski Bunny" – 2:00
5. "Green Shirt" – 1:51
6. "I Dig You" – 3:15
7. "Try One" – 1:49
8. "What the Fuck" – 1:54
9. "White Sand" – 2:40
10. "I Idolize You" (Ike Turner) – 2:59
11. "Punkture" – 2:30
12. "Strawberry" – 2:51
13. "Walk In" – 2:55
14. "Texas" – 3:51
15. "Sam" – 2:52

== Personnel ==
- Jon Spencer – guitar
- Cristina Martinez – vocals
- Jens Jurgensen – bass
- Hollis Queens – drums
