= The Immortal Lee County Killers =

American rock band

- Origin: Auburn, Lee County, Alabama, United States
- Genres: Punk blues Garage punk
- Years active: 1999–2007
- Labels: Estrus
- Past members: Chetley "Cheetah" Weise; J.R. "J.R.R. Tokien" Collins; John Wesley Myers; Doug "The Boss" Sherrard; Jeff Goodwin

The Immortal Lee County Killers (ILCK) were an American rock band from Auburn, Lee County, Alabama. Playing in the punk blues style, as well as garage punk, the band consisted of Chetley "Cheetah" Weise on vocals/guitar, plus assorted musicians over its roughly three incarnations.

Weise had formerly fronted The Quadrajets. ILCK formed in late 1999 and dissolved in 2007, just as it was gaining underground popularity. These incarnations were known sequentially as ILCK I, ILCK II, and ILCK III, and recorded three full-length albums and several singles.

== Musical style ==
Chet Weise is an enthusiastic and avid proponent of the often-underground punk blues style.

The Immortal Lee County Killers has been called "Truly the place where punk meets the blues." Weise often referred to punk blues as the "fucked up blues" and the "real punk blues". Taking influence from Robert Johnson, John Lee Hooker, Pussy Galore, MC5, Skip James, Bad Brains and The Gun Club, ILCK approached the punk blues genre with reverence and originality, lending credibility to a genre that had sometimes been previously employed as a musically ironic post-punk and garage rock aesthetic. They did not take influence from blues-rock, preferring the older Delta blues and Chicago blues styles.

Chet Weise—a university professor of political economics and a blues connoisseur—has stated, "Punk and blues are both honest reactions to life. It's blues, it's our blues. It's just a bit turned up and a bit faster."

== Post-breakup ==
After The Immortal Lee County Killers' 2007 breakup, Weise went on to front a new punk blues band, Silver Lion's 20/20. John Wesley Myers also started a new band, Black Diamond Heavies, he also recorded a solo album, Solitary Pleasure, released on April 12, 2011.

== Members ==
=== ILCK I ===
- Chetley "Cheetah" Weise: vocals, guitar, harp
- Doug: drums

=== ILCK II ===
- Chetley "Cheetah" Weise: vocals, guitar, harp
- J.R. "J.R.R. Tokien" Collins: drums, backup vocals
- Jeff Goodwin: organ, backup vocals

=== ILCK III ===
- Chetley "Cheetah" Weise: vocals, guitar, harp
- J.R. "J.R.R. Tokien" Collins: drums, bass, backup vocals
- Jeff: organ, backup vocals
- John Wesley Myers: church organ

== Discography ==
=== Albums ===
- (2000) The Essential Fucked Up Blues LP/CD (Estrus)
- (2003) Love Is A Charm Of Powerful Trouble LP/CD (Estrus)
- (2003) Love Unbolts The Dark CD (Sweet Nothing)
- (2006) These Bones Will Rise To Love You Again CD (Tee Pee Records)

=== Singles ===
- (2000) Big Damn Roach 7" (Homo Habilis, ILCK 01)
- (2000) Train She Rides 7" (Homo Habilis, ILCK 06)
- (2001) Let's Get Killed 7" (Estrus, ES 7156)
- (2004) Sonic Angel 7" (Munster Records, MR 7190)
- (2005) Turn on the Panther 7" (Sweet Nothing Records)

=== Splits ===
- (2001) ILCK/Matching Numbers 7" (Chicken Ranch Records, ILCK 07)
- (2002) ILCK/The Monkeywrench 7" (Bronx Cheer, ILCK 08)
- (2003) ILCK/Cash Audio: Orange Sessions Vol 2 10" (Orange, OR-23)
- (2003) ILCK/The Wednesdays 7" (Arkam Records, Arkam 8)

=== Compilations ===
- (2000) The Estrus Apeshit Rock Sampler Vol. 2 CD (Estrus, ES 1275)
- (2000) The Isle Of Spight CD (Catch And Release, CR 006)
- (2002) The Estrus Double Dynomite Sampler Volume 3 CD (Estrus, ES 1288)
- (2004) Smash Music Sampler CD (Smash Music, smash 008)
- (2005) This Is Punk Rock Blues - Vol No. 1 CD (Punk Rock Blues, PRB CD001)
