= Love American Style (album) =

Studio album by The Honeymoon Killers
- Released: 1985
- Recorded: CBGB's (New York City, NY)
- Genre: Noise rock, punk blues
- Length: 37:50
- Label: Fur
- Producer: The Honeymoon Killers

The Honeymoon Killers chronology
The Honeymoon Killers from Mars (1984)	Love American Style (1985)	Let It Breed (1986)

Love American Style is the second studio album by noise rock band The Honeymoon Killers, independently released in 1985 by Fur Records.

== Release and reception ==
Critics of the Trouser Press described Love American Style as a "crunching descent into lighthearted sonic warfare"

== Track listing ==
All tracks are written by Jerry Teel, except where noted

Side one
No.	Title	Length
1.	"Why"	5:27
2.	"Night After Night"	6:50
3.	"Wee Dawgees"	1:30
4.	"Boom Like I Like It"	6:00

Side two
No.	Title	Writer(s)	Length
1.	"Batman"	Neal Hefti	2:35
2.	"Pain Is Easy"		4:37
3.	"Good 'N' Cheap"		4:13
4.	"Motor City"		5:07
5.	"Here We All Are"		1:28

== Personnel ==
Adapted from the Love American Style liner notes.

The Honeymoon Killers

- Sally Edroso – drums, vocals
- Jerry Teel – electric guitar, harmonica, vocals, cover art
- Lisa Wells – bass guitar, vocals

Production and additional personnel

- The Honeymoon Killers – production
- Steve McAllister – engineering

== Release history ==
Region	Date	Label	Format	Catalog
United States	1985	Fur	LP	FUR 2
