= Action Swingers =

- 1990 lineup. L–R: Pete Shore, Bob Bert, Julia Cafritz, Ned Hayden

Background information
- Origin: New York City, U.S.
- Genres: Garage punk, indie rock, garage rock
- Years active: Late 1980s–1998
- Labels: Primo Scree, Wiiija, Caroline, Reptilian
- Past members: Ned Hayden; Julia Cafritz; Johan Kugelberg; Pete Shore; Howie Pyro; Bob Bert; Bruce Bennett; Tim Cedar; Barry Stillwell; Dave Lindsay; Brett Wilder

Action Swingers was an American indie rock/garage punk band formed in the late 1980s in New York City, fronted by singer/guitarist Ned Hayden, who was the only constant member. During its history the band featured members of several other bands, both as full members and guest musicians. The band split up in 1998.

== History ==
The band was formed in the late 1980s by Ned Hayden along with Pussy Galore member Julia Cafritz (guitar, vocals), and with drummer Johan Kugelberg and producer Don Fleming, they recorded their debut single "Bum My Trip" / "Kicked in the Head" in 1989, Fleming also contributing drums to the follow-up, "Fear of a Fucked Up Planet". Hayden and Cafritz were then joined by Unsane bassist Pete Shore and former Sonic Youth/Pussy Galore drummer Bob Bert, this lineup recording the self-titled debut album, released in September 1991. Cafritz had left by early 1992, forming Free Kitten with Kim Gordon, with guitarist Bruce Bennett (concurrent member of the A-Bones) and bassist Howie Pyro playing on a session recorded for John Peel's BBC Radio 1 show in March that year. The More Fast Numbers EP followed in mid-1992. Former Loveblobs/future Part Chimp member Tim Cedar replaced Bert for live shows in 1993 and a lineup of Hayden, Cedar, and bassist Barry Stillwell recorded tracks in Toe Rag Studios that would later see release as Complete Toe Rag Session. J Mascis played drums on two early tracks by the band. Two further albums were released — Decimation Blvd. (1993) and the compilation Quit While You're Ahead (1994) — before the band split up.

A recording of the band's final live performance, in New York in 1998, was released as a live album in 2004. The final lineup comprised Hayden, drummer Dave Lindsay and former Vacant Lot bassist Brett Wilder.

Allmusic writer Erik Hage described the band's sound as "incendiary garage punk". The band were described by The New York Times as "punk without pretences. Brutally elemental and patently obnoxious".

Hayden also formed the Ned Hayden Experience and the Ned Hayden Band. He currently lives in the suburbs of New York City with his wife and daughter.

== Discography ==
=== Albums ===
- Action Swingers (1991), Primo Scree
- Decimation Blvd. (1993), Caroline

Live

- Enough Already! ...Live! (2004), Reptilian - recorded 1998

Compilations

- Quit While You're Ahead (1994), Caroline
- Complete London Toe Rag Session (1999), Reptilian

=== EPs ===
- More Fast Numbers (1992), Wiiija

=== Singles ===
- "Bum My Trip"/"Kicked in the Head" (1989), Noiseville
- "Fear of a Fucked Up Planet" (1990), Primo Scree
- Live at the Sausage Machine - Wiiija Grunge War - Monday 19th October 1992 (1992), Wiiija - split flexi-disc with Loveblobs, included the track "Courtney Love"
- "Heavy Medication" (1998), Reptilian
- "Miserable Life"/"Losing My Cool" (2013), Total Punk
