= Ritual Tension =

American experimental rock

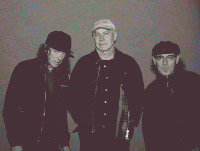

Background information
- Origin: New York City, New York, U.S.
- Genres: Post-punk, experimental rock, alternative rock
- Years active: 1983–1990, 2017-present
- Labels: Sacrifice Records; CBGB/Celluloid Records; Safe House Records; Arguably Records
- Members: Ivan Nahem; Marc Sloan; Michael Shockley
- Past members: Andrew Nahem; Claire Lawrence-Slater; Michael Jio

Ritual Tension is an American experimental rock band that formed in 1983 in New York City. They have released three studio albums and an EP. During their first incarnation all records were recorded at Martin Bisi's BC Studio in Brooklyn, and a live album taken from shows at CBGB, before their initial dissolution in 1990. At the same time, various configurations of the band members took part in art performances around Manhattan at venues such as Pyramid Club and PS 122. They re-formed in 2018, began playing shows and released a new album entitled It's Just the Apocalypse, It's Not the End in 2020, and played live together in 2023 at the Downtown Music Gallery.

== History ==
Ritual Tension began with brothers Ivan and Andrew Nahem (sons of baseball player Sam Nahem). They had played together in a band they formed called Crop at San Francisco punk rock clubs in the late 1970s. Ivan had previously played drums in The Situations. Crop's lineup also included Mark C. and Tom Paine. Subsequently, Ivan Nahem, Paine, and Mark C. moved to New York City in 1980. Displeased with the direction of the band in the new location, Ivan left to form Carnival Crash with longtime friend John Griffin Morrissey and Norman Westberg (the latter had auditioned for Crop at C.'s loft), and later adding James Lo when Ivan switched from drums to vocals. Carnival Crash gigged around town and recorded an album's worth of material at Noise New York with Frank Eaton engineering. However they split up while recording in the studio and Ivan released a single, "Edge of Night" b/w "Tell Tale Heart", under the name Ivan X. Paine and C. subsequently formed Live Skull, while Westberg joined Swans.

Andrew Nahem moved to New York City in 1981 and the brothers began rehearsing together in the East Village. The band, as Tension, made their live debut on May 5, 1983 at the Speed Trials music festival at White Columns. Reviews were positive for their 25-minute performance of "All Wound Up", performed with drum machine, guitar, effects, and vocals. Tension also recorded "All Wound Up" at Noise New York.

Claire Lawrence-Slater was added on bass and eventually Michael Jio on drums. They began playing East Village clubs, rehearsing in the Honeymoon Killers studio. Lawrence-Slater left the band, later playing with Honeymoon Killers and Ultra-Huge. She was replaced by Marc Sloan.

In summer 1985, Ivan Nahem played drums during Swans recording sessions; the resulting tracks were later issued on that band's 1986 albums Greed and Holy Money.

Now known as Ritual Tension, the band recorded their first album, I Live Here, at Martin Bisi's B.C. studio. It was released on James Reynold's Sacrifice Records, in 1986. After the album's release, Michael Shockley replaced Jio on drums.

The next recording with Bisi was the 1987 EP Hotel California, released on James Reynolds' Safe House Records. It featured an eight-minute cover of the title song by the Eagles, a wry deconstruction and a salute to their roots by the Nahem brothers, who grew up in the Bay Area. It also included Ritual Tension's signature song, "The Grind". The EP and the debut were also reissued together by Sacrifice as I Live Here/Hotel California.

As the band gained popularity in the East Village scene, playing clubs like Cat Club, The Ritz, Pyramid Club, The Bottom Line, and Knitting Factory, their true home became CBGB, where they had come to the attention of CBGB owner Hilly Kristal, leading to headliner slots and a live "Off the Board" album recorded in 1986 at the club entitled The Blood of the Kid and released in 1987 by CBGB/Celluloid Records.

Expelled was the final studio album of this period, again recorded with Bisi and released in 1989 by Safe House. The group disbanded in 1990, but played a final reunion performance in Hoboken, New Jersey in May 1993.

Past Tense, a 15-track collection of Ritual Tension material, was issued on Sacrifice in 1999.

In 2016, Ivan and Andrew Nahem began working at the studio of Michael Jung's Hizhaus Recording, remixing their early song "All Wound Up", as well as rediscovered tapes of the Noise New York recordings by Carnival Crash, which would become the Carnival Crash release It Is a Happy Man on James Reynold's Obelisk Records in 2020.

In 2017, Ivan Nahem began working on a project with Pittsburgh Noise music artist Gregg Bielski that came to be called ex->tension. Bielski initially asked Nahem to put spoken word vocals to his soundtracks, and eventually the latter's Ritual Tension bandmates were enlisted for separate collaborations, with Andrew Nahem's guitar on three tracks and Sloan and Shockley contributing to one track each. The resulting album, The Kiss, by ex->tension, was released on RORER 714 Records (and subsequently re-issued in Japan by the Meditation label of Ichiro Tsuji of the band Dissecting Table). This was followed by performances by Ivan Nahem and Gregg Bielski with other members of Ritual Tension, which in turn led to a reformation of Ritual Tension in 2017, without guitarist Andrew Nahem. They played their first reunion date at Century in Philadelphia on February 23, 2018. This was followed by a show at SideWalk Cafe in New York City on March 15, 2018. The band came together again and played shows in 2018 and '19 in New York, Philadelphia and Pittsburgh. Marc Sloan expanded his role to an overall more bass heavy approach. They began recording in Rehobeth Beach, DE at Cubano Enfuego Studios, and then moved to Deepsea Studio in Hoboken, to work with friend and engineer Mark C. Emilio Zef China, who played with Peter Murphy, played violin and guitar on two tracks.

The album It's Just the Apocalypse, It's Not the End was released on July 28, 2020 on Arguably Records. The album included seven original songs and two covers: "Manic Depression" by Jimi Hendrix and "Shakin' Street" by the MC5. A record release event was scuttled due to the pandemic.

On August 19, 2023 Ivan (vocals, percussion) and Marc (bass, vocals) played Ritual Tension songs at the End of Summer Event at the International Fusion Museum in Easton, PA.

Ritual Tension, consisting of Ivan, Marc and Michael, played at the Downtown Music Gallery in Manhattan on October 3, 2023.

== Reception ==
Ritual Tension's releases were critically acclaimed, mostly in fanzines but also in more mainstream press.

"Impossible to categorize, oblivious to convention, at points it approaches being a rock record, although from a hitherto unexplored direction... probably the best rhythm [section] in New York City. Ritual Tension is a thing best experienced live. You ain't heard like this. But you'll be glad when you have." - Away From the Pulsebeat

"This is music at the end of its tether, trapped, dangerous. They shout of New York lowlife, but it's not the lovable bozos of Tom Waits. They're on a long leash but holding it themselves. Ritual Tension are people you genuinely would not want to meet down any dark alley. You even feel uneasy with them on your turntable. Magnificent." - Melody Maker

"The tension wires of sound and imagery both geared wholly to a critique of modern ways, at times recall PiL's more virulent work, but really Ritual Tension are answerable only to themselves, not to history." - Sounds

"'Here' is the Lower East Side, and they're talking to (or yelling at) you, Person Who Doesn't Live on the Lower East Side. Surprisingly, this parochial approach is good for music a lot more intense and universal than, to choose the relevant example, the Bush Tetras' 'Too Many Creeps'." - Robert Chrisgau in The Village Voice

"...the new albums from Live Skull, Sonic Youth, Ut, rat at rat r and Ritual Tension reflect shared attitudes and roots... All these bands have a rising energy about them, suggesting that they haven't begun to peak. Following their development is going to her a pleasure... [Ritual Tension's] rhythm section is fluid but packs a punch, and Andrew Nahem's guitar work is distinctive and full of energy." - Robert Palmer in The New York Times

"Ritual Tension is a sparse dose of appropriately named energy... Ritual Tension makes noncommericial music outside of even Punk's accepted norms. Tension's songs are hard. It takes some listening and thinking to figure out how to hear their sound." - Spin

"This band has a unique style and unique vision. This is dance music for the afterhours crowd, a soundtrack for a dark generation. While the rhythm section kicks along aggressively, Andrew Nahem's guitar barks and whines, dense and abrasive in spots, or at times following rhythms and riffs. Ivan Nahem's vocals are the real show, sometimes amusing, sometimes poetic, and often surreal. A stirring vision." - Option

"Rarely has any band tortured and twisted a 70s rock standard to such extremes... String-strangler Andrew Nahem stretches bizarre sounds up and down that neck, like bugs crawling over naked bodies. Vocalist Ivan Nahem is a real natural. The quartet have done a fine job of producing themselves, especially the background vocals. The rhythm team is no less powerful. A totally harrowing experience. If I wasn't so tough, I'd have a hard time dealing with this disk." - Jersey Beat

"All three records are indispensable. This is modern music without training wheels. Once it's gotten into the bloodstream, it exhilarates and resonates through abrupt time changes and shifts in mood. Ritual tension has reached that same plane of compositional brilliance that inspired Trout mask replica or drove the birthday party to produce something as twisted as prayers on fire. These are real songs, I'll be a different than the Pablo most music industry types think should be consumed. There's genuine intelligence and musicianship at work here." - Reflex

"Ritual Tension share a kinship with Live Skull and Sonic Youth, but they're more precise and the effect is more immediate. 'The Wrong Tack' is chilling. 'Tightrope', with a loping baseline drill-bit guitar passages and superb vocal performance has an equal effect. Uneasy music, yet with a seductive quality." - Suburban Voice

"It's hot, children it's Beefheart, Beethoven, Wire, The Birthday Party and Charles Ives rolled together. It's difficult to categorize. It's even harder to take off your turntable." - Jet Lag

"Recorded in 1988, the excellently self-produced Expelled is the finest display yet of the band's offbeat musicianship. The dissonance is so vibrantly arranged and performed that it actually becomes catchy." - Trouser Press

It's Just the Apocalypse, It's Not the End also achieved recognition. Rich Quinlan of Jersey Beat wrote: "Ritual Tension is a band with its roots firmly planted in the punk, no-wave, and noise scenes of the very late 1970s in San Francisco before moving to NYC in the early 1980s... Now, thirty years after their final performance, Ritual Tension has returned, this time sans Andrew, as a trio on the experimental and wonderfully noisy It's Just the Apocalypse, It's Not the End. .. Ritual Tension never abandoned their artistic interpretation of what punk rock can be, and It's Just the Apocalypse, It's Not the End is a free-flowing and fearless display of confidence from a collection of players who have refused, thankfully, to surrender to any expectations other than their own. The world needs more from acts like Ritual tension right now."

Jack Rabid, New York critic, reviewed it in the The Big Takeover Issue #87: “Apocalypse realizes a post-punk continuum from 1986's I Live Here and 1989's Expelled. The remembered high-treble bass, big tom drums, and high pitched guitar (see “Tightrope”) return in “Come Back, Come Back” and “Monsters Are Real.” Likewise, Nahem growls, shouts, and spews like Tom Waits and ex-Radio Birdman Deniz Tek, expressing the malicious, McDonalds-slogan mocking “I'm Loving It” and the desperately-seeking-free-alcohol “I Can't Find the Party”... Wild!”

The German writer Matze Van Bauseneick wrote in Krautnick Magazine: “Almost out of the blue, the experimental New York no-wave trio Ritual Tension has gotten together again to make a new statement about time and the world: It's Just The Apocalypse, It's Not The End is the title of the first album since the Eighties. And it sounds as if neither time nor the world has passed: dirty fuzz rock... sweeping energy, unique structures with the songs catchy at the same time - so fat!”

== Other projects ==
Marc Sloan played extensively with many collaborators, including Elliott Sharp's Carbon, Rhys Chatham, False Prophets and Reed Ghazala. He currently works with drummer Simon Fishburn in Forever Moonlight. His compendium album Reel to Real Volume One was released October 1, 2020.

Michael Shockley played in Sweet Lizard Illtet, and currently performs in the Shockley Brothers, Big Hat No Cattle and Hot Sauce Band.

Andrew Nahem has contributed music to various film projects, such as Elevator Moods, Miru Kim and Isidore Roussel's Blind Door, and as the fictional band Infra Dig. He designed the artwork for "It's Just the Apocalypse, It Isn't the End" and Crawling Through Grass by Ivan Nahem + ex->tension. He plays guitar on various tracks of that album as well.

Ivan Nahem has published stories, essays and poems in various magazines, and was the founder/editor of Yoga Teacher Magazine. Collaborating with Gregg Bielski he released The Kiss under the band name ex->tension in 2017. His album Crawling Through Grass by Ivan Nahem + ex->tension, featuring Andrew Nahem on guitar, with contributions by Mark C. of Live Skull, Norman Westberg of Swans, and Jon Fried of The Cucumbers, was released May 13, 2022 by Arguably Records, subsequent to which Ivan did a number of podcast and print interviews. He created a website for all his projects called onaboutnow. He will release Agonist In Love by Ivan & The Figments, a collaborative concept album, on December 12, 2026 on Rorer 714 Records. A gig at The Government Center in Pittsburgh is scheduled for November 23, 2026.

== Discography ==
=== Studio albums ===
- I Live Here (1986, Sacrifice Records)
- Expelled (1989, Safe House Records)
- It's Just the Apocalypse, It's Not the End (2020, Arguably Records)

=== EPs ===
- Hotel California (1987, Safe House Records)

=== Live albums ===
- The Blood of the Kid (1987, CBGB/Celluloid Records)

=== Compilation albums ===
- I Live Here/Hotel California (1987, Sacrifice Records)
- Past Tense (1999, Sacrifice Records)

=== Post-Ritual Tension collaborative albums ===
- The Kiss (2017, RORER 714 Records)
- Crawling Through Grass (2022, Arguably Records)
