= Sam Nahem =

American baseball player (1915–2004)

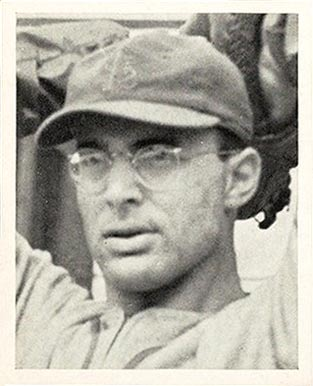
- Pitcher
- Born: October 19, 1915; New York City, New York, U.S.
- Died: April 19, 2004 (aged 88); Berkeley, California, U.S.
- Batted: Right Threw: Right

MLB debut
- October 2, 1938, for the Brooklyn Dodgers

Last MLB appearance
- September 11, 1948, for the Philadelphia Phillies

MLB statistics
- Win–loss record: 10–8
- Earned run average: 4.69
- Strikeouts: 101
- Stats at Baseball Reference

Teams
- Brooklyn Dodgers (1938); St. Louis Cardinals (1941); Philadelphia Phillies (1942, 1948)

Samuel Ralph Nahem (October 19, 1915 – April 19, 2004), nicknamed "'Subway Sam", was an American pitcher for the Brooklyn Dodgers (1938), St. Louis Cardinals (1941), and Philadelphia Phillies (1942 and 1948). His professional baseball playing was interrupted by military service (1942–1946) with the United States Army in the European Theater of Operations during World War II. Articles have been written and a talk at Cooperstown given on his role in the integration of American baseball, because as manager and pitching star he insisted on having Black players on his O.I.S.E. team roster, and in an exciting best of five series they beat an all-White, much more professional team, with the final game ironically played in Nuremberg stadium, known as Stadion der Hitler-Jugend from 1933 until 1945, when the U.S. army temporarily named it Soldier's Field.

== Early and personal life ==
Nahem was born to Sephardic Jewish parents in New York City. His parents, Isaac and Emilie ("Milo", née Sitt) Nahem had immigrated from Aleppo, Syria, to the United States, first to the Lower East Side in Manhattan where Samuel was initially raised, and then in the Bensonhurst section of Brooklyn, and finally Ocean Parkway. His first language was Arabic, as his family spoke Arabic.

His father, who owned an import-export business, drowned when the British passenger steamship SS Vestris sank off the coast of Virginia on November 12, 1928.

He rebelled against Hebrew school when he was 13 years old. He later went to New Utrecht High School, where he was unable to make the baseball team. Nahem then attended Brooklyn College, where he pitched for the school's baseball team and played quarterback and fullback for its football team, graduating in 1935.

While in the college he also started participating in Communist Party activities. He quit the Communist Party in the mid-1950s after the Soviet Union invaded Hungary.

He and his wife Elsie, whom he met after World War II, who worked as a commercial artist and who died in 1974, had three children, Ivan, Joanne, and Andrew. Ivan and Andrew Nahem founded the underground, experimental rock band Ritual Tension in the 1980s in New York, which was active until at least 2022. Joanne moved to Minneapolis and became a therapist.

Nahem also was the uncle of Major League Baseball outfielder Al Silvera, who was the son of his sister Vicky.

== Baseball career ==
After graduating from Brooklyn College, Nahem signed with the Brooklyn Dodgers. During the off-season he attended St. John's University School of Law, earning a law degree and passing the bar examination in 1941. He was known for reading literature in the dugout and in the bullpen, and for quoting Shakespeare and de Maupassant in conversations. During spring training in 1940, an Associated Press reporter wrote: “Sam wears spectacles and talks less like a ballplayer than any diamond star this reporter knows. For reading material Nahem does not devote his time to pulp magazines — the Westerns, Adventure stories and whatnot — but goes for the realistic Russians, Dostoievski, Gorki, Chekov, and Tolstoi.”

In the minor leagues in 1937 he was 15–5 with the Clinton Owls of the Illinois-Indiana-Iowa League, and then pitched for the Elmira Pioneers of the Eastern League in 1938, the Montreal Royals of the International League and the Nashville Volunteers of the Southern Association in 1939, the Louisville Colonels of the American Association and Houston Buffaloes of the Texas League in 1940 (when he led the league in ERA), and the Columbus Redbirds of the American Association in 1941. He joked that he played for so many teams, he became known as "formerly of ..., as in 'Sam Nahem, formerly of ..."

He made his major league debut in 1938 at the age of 22. Asked about his tenuous standing with the Dodgers after he was shelled in a spring training game in 1940, he responded to a reporter: "I am in the egregiously anonymous position of pitching batting practice to the batting practice pitchers." In June 1940, he was traded by the Dodgers with Carl Doyle, Bert Haas, and Ernie Koy to the St. Louis Cardinals for Curt Davis and future Hall of Famer Joe Medwick. Considering subsequent events, it is notable that Nahem had an amicable relationship with Branch Rickey, then working as business manager (which today would mean general manager) for the Cardinals.

In 1941, he pitched a career-high 81 2/3 innings, and had a record of 5–2 with an ERA of 2.98 for the Cardinals. February 1942 he was purchased by the Philadelphia Phillies from the Cardinals. In 1942 Nahem was 9th in the NL in games finished (16), and in 1948 he was 7th in the league (17). His career was interrupted by military service starting in 1943, when he volunteered to enlist despite being asthmatic.

In four Major League seasons Nahem had a 10–8 win–loss record. In 90 games, he started 12 games and had 3 complete games, 42 games finished, 224 1/3 innings pitched, 222 hits allowed, 138 runs, 117 earned runs, 8 home runs, 127 walks, 101 strikeouts, 7 hit batsmen, 9 wild pitches, and a 4.69 ERA.

== War Years and Role in the Process of the Integration of Baseball ==
During spring training in 1940, an Associated Press reporter wrote: “Sam wears spectacles and talks less like a ballplayer than any diamond star this reporter knows. For reading material Nahem does not devote his time to pulp magazines — the Westerns, Adventure stories and whatnot — but goes for the realistic Russians, Dostoievski, Gorki, Chekov, and Tolstoi.”

As a left-wing radical and a Jew who had faced anti-Semitism in various guises, Nahem was sympathetic to the plight of African Americans, and believed in equalizing civil rights and social status. “I was in a strange position. The majority of my fellow ballplayers, wherever I was, were very much against black ballplayers, and the reason was economic and very clear. They knew these guys had the ability to be up there and they knew their jobs were threatened directly and they very, very vehemently did all sorts of things to discourage black ballplayers."

Nahem and Cardinals general manager Branch Rickey, who played an immense role in baseball’s integration, knew Sam, and knew his political leaning. He actually had had a talk with Nahem that helped restore his confidence. According to Nahem, Rickey told him that he had faith in him. “He said I was his boy, and he was picking me to make good. He told me I would pitch well the rest of the season, and darned if I didn’t.”

Nahem went overseas in late 1944, serving with an anti-aircraft artillery division. From his base in Reims, France, he was assigned to run two baseball leagues for servicemen in France, while also managing and pitching for his own team, the Oise All-Stars, representing Communications Zone (Com Z), composed mainly of semi-pro, college, and ex-minor-league players. They represented the army command in charge of communication and logistics in the liberated areas. Besides Nahem, only one other Oise player had major league experience — Russ Bauers, who had a 29-29 record with the Pirates between 1936 and 1941. Defying the military establishment and baseball tradition, Nahem and his associate, Captain Robert H. Wormhoudt, wanted African Americans on the team, and secured two Negro League stars: Willard Brown, an outfielder with the Kansas City Monarchs and one of the Negro Leagues’ most feared sluggers, and Leon Day, a star pitcher for the Newark Eagles.

Each branch of the military and different divisions had their own teams. According to Nahem’s biographer Peter Dreier, "The competition among the American teams in Europe was fierce. Nahem’s Oise team won 17 games and lost only one, attracting as many as 10,000 fans to their games. Nahem beat the Navy All-Stars in England, then pitcher Bob Keane beat the same team in France, to advance the Oise team to the semi-finals. On September 1, in the semi-final round, Nahem pitched the Oise All-Stars into the European champion series by beating the 66th Division team, representing the Sixteenth Corps, by a 5-4 margin in 11 innings. Nahem also got four hits in five at-bats."

Their adversary in the finals was well-heeled by comparison. Representing the 3rd Army, which was commanded by General George Patton, the 71st Infantry Red Circlers was a Whites-only dream team, named for their red circle shoulder patches. Patton had clout and that clout had helped organize an excellent team through transfers. St. Louis Cardinals All-Star outfielder Harry Walker was given the assignment to assemble the team, which besides him included Ewell Blackwell, Reds second baseman Benny Zientara, Pirates outfielders Johnny Wyrostek and Maurice Van Robays, Cardinals catcher Herb Bremer, Cardinals pitcher Al Brazle, Pirates pitcher Ken Heintzelman, and Giants pitcher Ken Trinkle. Few people gave Nahem’s Oise All-Stars much of a chance.

The Oise All-Stars and the Red Circlers played the first two games in Nuremberg, Germany, in the same stadium where Hitler had addressed Nazi Party rallies. The U.S. Army constructed a baseball diamond and renamed the stadium Soldiers Field. Blackwell pitched the Red Circlers to a 9-2 victory in front of 50,000 fans, most of them American soldiers, on September 2, 1945. In the second game Leon Day held the Circlers to one run. Brown drove in the Oise’s team first run, and then Nahem, who was playing first base, doubled in the seventh inning to knock in the go-ahead run. Oise won the game by a 2-1 margin. Day struck out 10 batters, allowed four hits and walked only two hitters.

The two teams flew to Oise’s home field in Reims for the next two games. The Oise team won the third game, as the New York Times reported, “behind the brilliant pitching of S/Sgt Sam Nahem,” who won a pitching duel with Blackwell to win 2-1. In the fourth game, the 3rd Army’s minor league pitcher Bill Ayers shut out the Oise squad, beating Day by a 5-0 margin.

The teams returned to Nuremberg for the deciding game on September 8, 1945. Nahem started for the Oise team in front of over 50,000 spectators. After the Red Circlers scored a run and then loaded the bases with one out in the fourth inning, Nahem took himself off the mound and brought in Bob Keane, who got out of the inning unscathed and completed the game. The Oise team won the game 2-1. A Jewish Communist pitcher and two Negro Leaguers had been instrumental in winning the G.I. World Series. The Sporting News ran a photo of Nahem in its report.

Back in France, Brigadier Gen. Charles Thrasher organized a parade and a banquet dinner, with steaks and champagne, for the Oise All-Stars. As historian Robert Weintraub wrote: “Day and Brown, who would not be allowed to eat with their teammates in many major-league towns, celebrated alongside their fellow soldiers.”

In October 1945, a month after this victory which showed to thousands of Americans how integration could work, Nahem’s former boss Branch Rickey announced that Jackie Robinson had signed a contract with the Dodgers.

== Later career ==
Upon joining the military in 1942, Nahem spent two years at Fort Totten, where he pitched for the Anti-Aircraft Redlegs of the Eastern Defense Command. He set a Sunset League record with an ERA of 0.85, and came second in batting with a .400 average.

Nahem combined practicing law and working as a longshoremen while playing semi-professionally with the Brooklyn Bushwicks, in 1947 pitching the team to a 3–0 one-hit victory over the World Series All-Stars, which included Major League players Eddie Stanky, Ralph Branca, and Phil Rizzuto. After his second spell with the Phillies, for whom he pitched his last game in September 1948 at 32 years of age, he was released.

== Later life ==
Nahem moved to the East Bay in the San Francisco Bay area in 1955, and then to Berkeley, California, in 1964, partly due to McCarthyite blacklisting which made it difficult for him to secure employment. He worked at the Chevron chemical plant in Richmond for 25 years, retiring in 1980. During his time there he was also a rank-and-file organizer and leader for the Oil, Chemical and Atomic Workers International Union.

Nahem died at his home in Berkeley, at the age of 88.

== See also ==
- List of Jewish Major League Baseball players
- Jews and Baseball: An American Love Story, 2010 documentary
