= Boss Hog =

American punk rock band

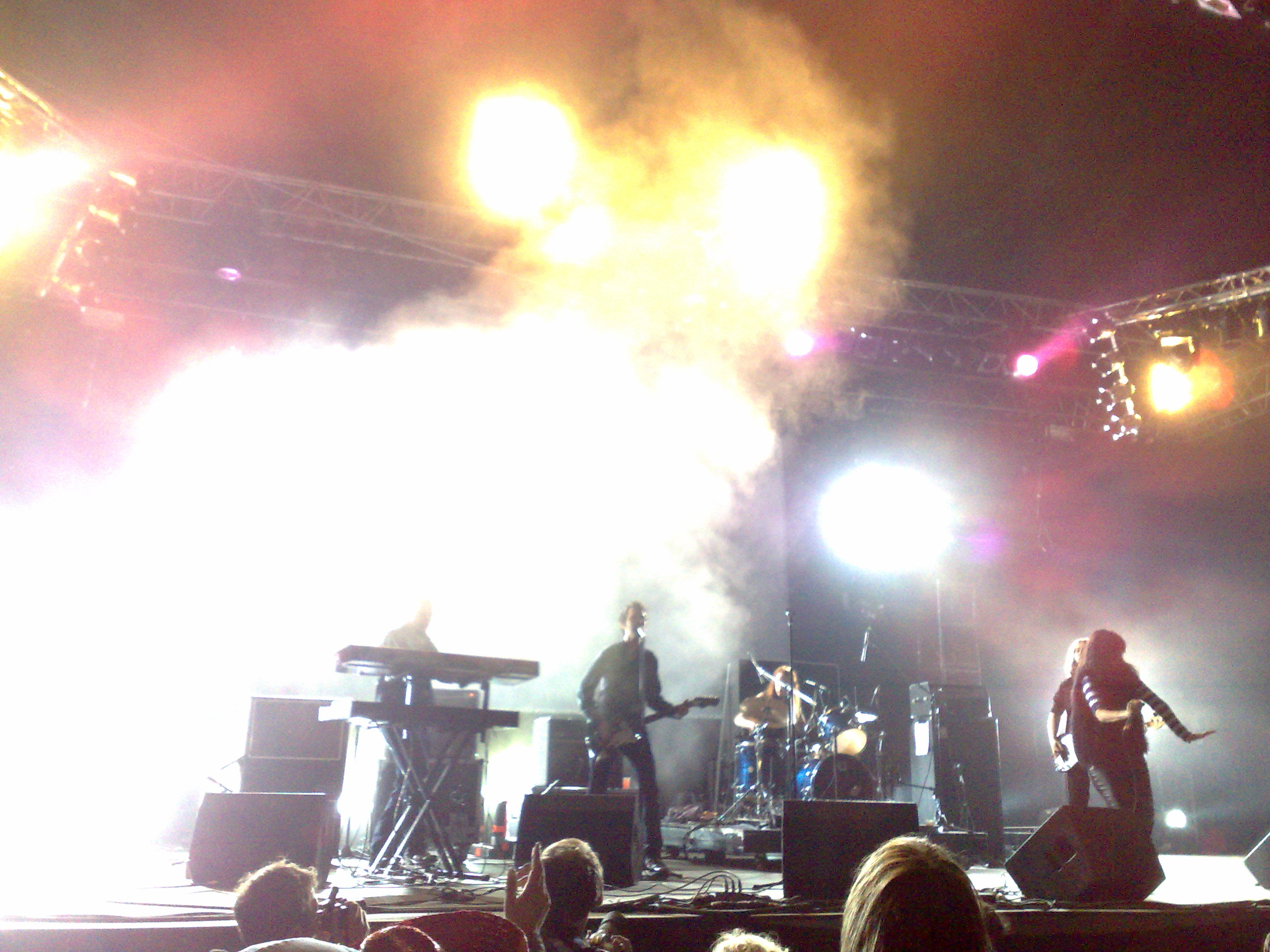
- Boss Hog live 2009

Background information
- Origin: New York City, U.S.
- Genres: Punk blues, garage punk
- Years active: 1989–2001; 2008–present
- Labels: Amphetamine Reptile; DGC; In the Red; Bronze Rat
- Spinoff of: Pussy Galore
- Members: Cristina Martinez; Jon Spencer; Jens Jurgensen; Hollis Queens; Mickey Finn
- Past members: Charlie Ondras; Jerry Teel; Kurt Wolf; Pete Shore; Marcellus Hall; Mark Boyce
- Website: facebook.com/BossHogOfficial/, twitter.com/BossHogBitches, instagram.com/boss_hog_bitches/

Boss Hog is an American punk blues band including the husband and wife duo of Jon Spencer (guitar) and Cristina Martinez (vocals) along with Jens Jurgensen (bass), Hollis Queens (drums) and Mickey Finn (keyboard). The band achieved some notoriety, not only due to their abrasive sound, but more to Martinez's confrontational use of nudity on the band's record sleeves. In their 27-year history, the band's releases have been relatively sporadic, but comprised four full-length albums, a mini-album, three EP's and several singles. Between 2008 and 2010, the band played live and toured Europe and the US.

Boss Hog officially announced their return in May 2016 with details of US tour dates along with an EP, Brood Star, released by In the Red Records in July 2016. A new song, "17", was released in January 2017 to herald the band's first full-length album in 17 years – Brood X, released in March 2017.

Jon Spencer's other bands include Pussy Galore, of which Martinez became a peripheral member, and the Jon Spencer Blues Explosion both of which existed in parallel to Boss Hog.

== History ==
Boss Hog was formed in 1989, as something of an accidental side project, when Cristina Martinez and Jon Spencer were told of a last minute vacancy on the bill at the influential New York punk club CBGB's. The pair put together a group of musicians from members of The Honeymoon Killers and Unsane, along with Kurt Wolf from Pussy Galore. The gig is reported to have been an underground sensation in New York.

Spencer, Martinez, Wolf, Charlie Ondras, and Jerry Teel recorded the EP Drinkin', Lechin' & Lyin' with Steve Albini for the record label Amphetamine Reptile in 1989. The band's first full-length album, Cold Hands', was recorded thereafter with Peter Arsenault and Ed Bair, and featured Pete Shore of Unsane on bass. Soon after the album's release in 1990 Shore and Teel left the band. Jens Jurgensen joined on bass and the band toured Europe to promote the record. This lineup recorded the BBC Radio session and additional tracks that were released as the "Action Box" double single. Shortly thereafter, Wolf left the band and Marcellus Hall of Railroad Jerk joined on guitar for another European tour, and to record the track "Fire Of Love" for a Sub Pop single compilation called Smells Like Smoked Sausages. Soon after, drummer Charlie Ondras died.

Boss Hog took a break for over two years, whilst Spencer concentrated on The Jon Spencer Blues Explosion, prior to re-emerging in 1993 with a lean, stable line-up of Spencer, Martinez, Jurgensen and new drummer Hollis Queens. The new Boss Hog recorded the Girl + EP with Martin Bisi, whose success got them a record contract with David Geffen Company. Their 1995 major-label debut was simply entitled Boss Hog and was recorded with the help of Steve Fisk at NYC's famous Sear Sound studio. The band, with the help of keyboard-player Mark Boyce from the Goats, toured to promote this release in Europe, Japan, and Australia, as well as the US.

In 1996, Boss Hog made a brief appearance as themselves in the movie Joe's Apartment. After this, they took another extended break, reemerging in 2000 with the Whiteout album and Mark Boyce as part of the permanent lineup. Made with the help of Tore Johansson, Andy Gill, Jim Sclavunos, Roli Mosimann, Jim Thirlwell, and Bil Emmons Whiteout featured a typically minimalist approach and strong levels of glamour and sexual provocation, within a more polished sound. Their return was well received by fans. The success of Whiteout was accompanied by a number of singles and gigs and a flurry of publicity, before the band went silent again.

Boss Hog played their first US show in 8 years on December 3, 2008 at Maxwell's in Hoboken, New Jersey, and have since played various dates throughout Europe and the US. Mickey Finn took over the keyboards position in 2009.

In 2016, Amphetamine Reptile Records reissued Drinkin', Lechin' & Lyin' on vinyl and CD with new cover artwork as well as the Psychopticotic Vol. One EP to which Boss Hog contributed a cover of "Talk Talk" by The Music Machine.

Tour dates and details of the Brood Star EP and Brood X album were officially announced in May 2016.

== Discography ==
=== Albums ===
- Cold Hands (1990)
- Boss Hog (1995)
- Whiteout (2000)
- Brood X (2017)

=== EPs ===
- Drinkin', Lechin' & Lyin' (1989)
- Action Box (1991)
- Girl + (1993)
- Brood Star (2016)

=== Singles ===
- "I Dig You" (1996)
- "Winn Coma" (1996)
- "Old School" (1999)
- "Whiteout" (2000)
- "Get It While You Wait" (2000)
- "Itchy & Scratchy" (2000)
