= Michael Lavine =

American portrait photographer (born 1963)

Michael Lavine (born October 13, 1963, San Francisco) is a portrait photographer based in New York City. He grew up in Denver, and graduated from Denver's South High School in 1981.

After graduating high school, Lavine headed to the Pacific Northwest and attended The Evergreen State College in Olympia, Washington, graduating in 1985. He then moved to New York City, attending Parsons School of Design, where he received a B.F.A.

While in the state of Washington, Lavine became one of the "photographers of record" of the then nascent grunge music scene. His first work on a record was the front cover of Psycho-Head Blowout by White Zombie in 1987. His personal friendships with Kurt Cobain and other members of the group Nirvana gave him unparalleled access to create a visual record of that iconic group. He also photographed other grunge era bands such as White Zombie, Pearl Jam, Soundgarden, Monster Magnet, Sonic Youth and The Flaming Lips. Many of his photographs from this era were compiled in a 1996 Simon & Schuster book entitled Noise From the Underground.

One of Lavine's most well known photographs is the cover for the CD Life After Death by The Notorious B.I.G., which was released fifteen days after Biggie's murder. The black-and-white photograph features Wallace (Biggie) standing alongside a black funeral hearse. In hindsight many saw this as portending his death. In another black-and-white photograph from the same shoot, Wallace is standing in front of row after row of headstones in a graveyard.

Since 1988, Lavine has been photographing music and entertainment performers, landscapes, politicians and artists, as well as daily American life and everyday people. His style of bold, saturated colors, dynamic and extreme use of lighting, and his awareness of what works graphically and what doesn't, have made him a sought-after photographer. He has also received awards from Communication Arts' Photography and Advertising Annual each year since 1992, as well as from American Photography, the Art Director's Club and Photo District News.

Lavine currently resides in a Brooklyn neighborhood with his wife, Laurie Henzel and two daughters, Olive and Penny.

== Books ==
- Noise from the Underground: A Secret History of Alternative Rock Fireside (November 1996) ISBN 0-684-81513-3
- Wu-Tang Manual Riverhead Books (February 2005) ISBN 1-59448-018-4
- Grunge (with Thurston Moore) Abrams Books (October 1, 2009) ISBN 978-0810953178

== Photographic credit ==
- Blood, Guts and Pussy - Dwarves
- Living Proof - Cher
- Hello Nasty - Beastie Boys
- Superjudge - Monster Magnet
- Nevermind - Nirvana
- In Utero - Nirvana
- Life After Death - The Notorious B.I.G.
- Stankonia - Outkast
- Thought 'Ya Knew - CeCe Peniston
- Dial M for Motherfucker - Pussy Galore
- Sugarshit Sharp - Pussy Galore
- Immobilarity - Raekwon
- Louder Than Love - Soundgarden
- Daydream Nation - Sonic Youth
- Goo - Sonic Youth
- Severe Exposure - Six Finger Satellite
