= Julia Cafritz =

American guitarist

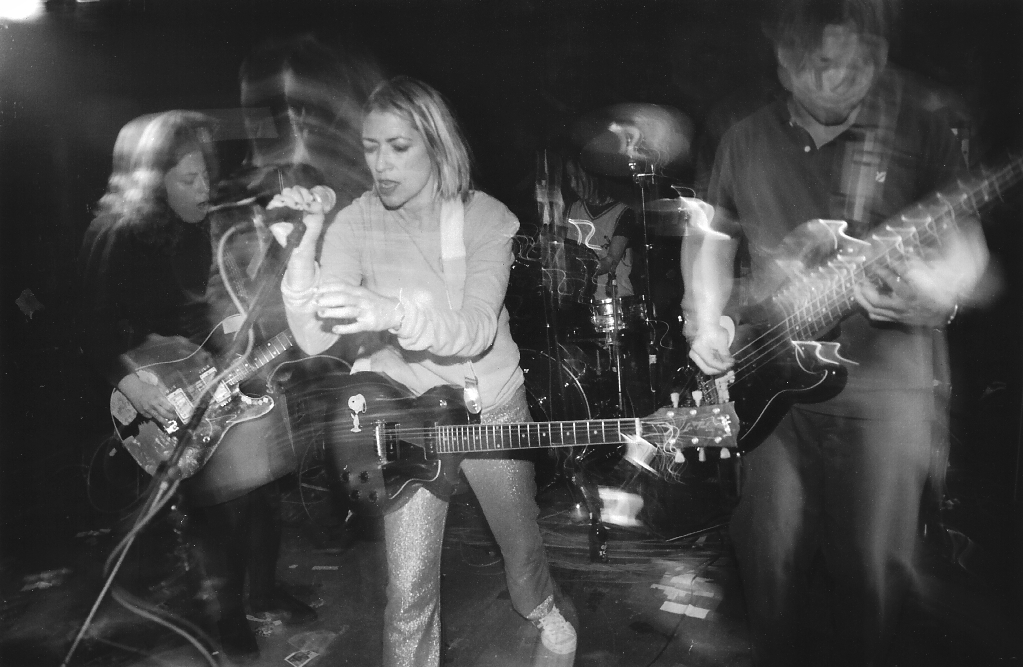
- Free Kitten with Kim Gordon, Julie Cafritz, Yoshimi P-We & Mark Ibold

Background information
- Born: May 5, 1965 (age 61)
- Origin: Washington, D.C., U.S.
- Genres: Noise music, alternative rock, punk rock
- Occupation: Musician
- Instruments: Guitar, vocals
- Years active: 1985–present

Julia Cafritz (born May 5, 1965) is an American guitarist and occasional vocalist who was a member of Pussy Galore and Free Kitten. She is regarded as a cult figure from the New York City noise music scene of the 1990s.

== Early life ==
Cafritz was born in Washington, DC, the daughter of Jennifer (née Stats) and Conrad Cafritz, a real estate developer with a personal fortune of over $100 million. She has a younger sister named Daisy von Furth, and two brothers, Eric and Matthew Cafritz. Her grandfather was the multimillionaire real estate developer and philanthropist Morris Cafritz.

Cafritz has a B.A. and M.A. from New York University, having dropped out of Brown University after forming Pussy Galore.

=== Pussy Galore ===
In 1985, guitarist Julia Cafritz and fellow Brown University classmate, Jon Spencer on vocals and guitar, and John Hammill on drums, formed the punk noise band Pussy Galore. In May 1986 they moved to New York City.

=== STP ===
In 1989, Cafritz left Pussy Galore and formed the short-lived all-girl group STP. STP released one single and toured with Nirvana and Sonic Youth. Cafritz joined fellow CBGBs Record Canteen clerk Ned Hayden's group, the Action Swingers.

=== Free Kitten ===
In 1992, she formed Free Kitten, a musical collaboration with Sonic Youth's Kim Gordon, drummer Yoshimi from the Boredoms and Pavement bassist Mark Ibold. They released records and toured on and off through 1997.

In 2008, Cafritz, Gordon and Yoshimi recorded and released Inherit on Ecstatic Peace Records after a ten-year hiatus.

==== Free Kitten discography ====
Albums:

- 1994: Unboxed (Wiiija)
- 1995: Nice Ass (Kill Rock Stars)
- 1997: Sentimental Education (Kill Rock Stars)
- 2008: Inherit (Ecstatic Peace)

EPs

- 1992: Call Now (Ecstatic Peace)
- 1996: Punks Suing Punks (Kill Rock Stars)

Singles

- 1992: "Yoshimi Vs. Mascis" split (Time Bomb)
- 1993: "Oh Bondage Up Yours!" (Sympathy for the Record Industry)
- 1993: "Lick!" (In The Red)
- 1993: "Special Groupie" (SOS)
- 1994: "Sex Boy" (Radiation)
- 1994: "Harvest Spoon" (Wiiija)
- 1997: "Chinatown Express" (Kill Rock Stars)
- 2008: "Seasick" (Ecstatic Peace)

=== Solo work ===
In 2012, Cafritz released a track called "dash dash dash" on a Thick Syrup Records Comp Called '78 LTD.

==== Julie Cafritz solo discography ====
- 2012: "dash dash dash", on Album '78 LTD (Thick Syrup Records)

== Personal life ==
Cafritz is married to Bob Lawton of Labor Board and Twin Towers Touring, who was a booking agent to bands like Sonic Youth, Yo La Tengo and Superchunk. In 2000, Cafritz and Lawton relocated to Florence, Massachusetts, where they ran a furniture store called Artifacts 20th Century. They have two children, daughter Alice and son Ollie.

While still playing music, Cafritz has taught English at Holyoke Community College.
