= Cristina Martinez (singer) =

American rock singer

Cristina Martinez (born February 1967) is an American rock singer. She is best known as the lead singer of Boss Hog. She has also been a member of Pussy Galore and The Honeymoon Killers. Her husband, guitarist Jon Spencer, collaborated with her in all three bands. Her music has included elements of blues, grunge, noise rock and new wave. She has been referred to as a sex symbol, and has appeared nude on album covers and in concert. She and Spencer have one son, Charlie.
