= Jon Spencer =

American singer-songwriter

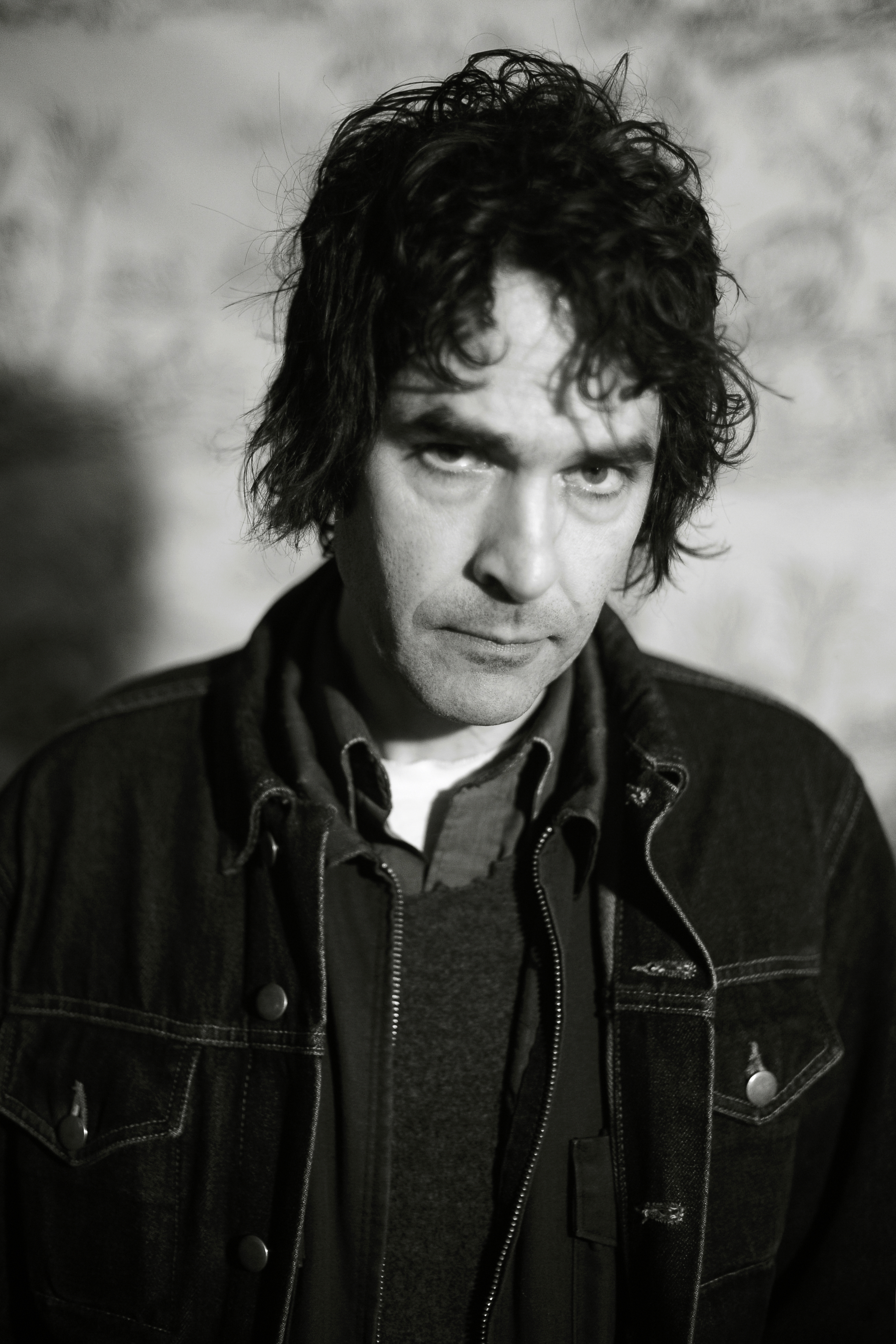
- Jon Spencer, 2013.

Background information
- Born: Jonathan Spencer; February 5, 1965 (age 61); Hanover, New Hampshire, United States
- Genres: Noise rock; punk blues; garage rock; blues rock
- Occupation: Musician
- Instruments: Vocals, guitar, theremin
- Years active: 1983–present
- Spouse: Cristina Martinez

Jon Spencer (born February 5, 1965) is an American singer, guitarist, and bandleader known for his work in the noise- and garage-rock scenes with Pussy Galore, Boss Hog, and especially Jon Spencer Blues Explosion. In the mid-1990s he collaborated with Mississippi hill country blues musician R. L. Burnside on the album A Ass Pocket of Whiskey (1996), a crossover that drew wider attention to Burnside beyond blues audiences. After announcing in 2022 that the Blues Explosion had ended, Spencer issued new music and toured with Jon Spencer & the Hitmakers, featuring Sam Coomes and Janet Weiss, and later formed a trio with Kendall Wind and Macky “Spider” Bowman of The Bobby Lees.

== History ==
Jon Spencer was born on February 5, 1965 in Hanover, New Hampshire, to a university professor and a cardiology technician. He attended Brown University in Providence, Rhode Island, where he was part of the noise rock band Shithaus, which included future Cop Shoot Cop vocalist Tod Ashley. The band was short lived and had a musical style reminiscent of the industrial music of Einstürzende Neubauten. He moved to Washington, D.C., and formed Pussy Galore, who quickly relocated to New York. Pussy Galore broke up in 1990.

Spencer formed Boss Hog in 1989 as a side project, and the Jon Spencer Blues Explosion in 1991. Spencer collaborated with R. L. Burnside in the mid-1990s, recording the album A Ass Pocket of Whiskey (1996) with the Blues Explosion, an unusual crossover that critics noted for exposing Burnside to audiences beyond traditional blues circles.

In February 2022, Spencer said on the Kreative Kontrol podcast that Jon Spencer Blues Explosion, on hiatus since 2016, was "no more," citing bandmate Judah Bauer’s health. He promoted new material with Jon Spencer & the Hitmakers.

He joined up with bassist Kendall Wind and drummer Macky Spider Bowman of The Bobby Lees in 2023 and released Sick of Being Sick! in 2024.

== Style and influences ==
Critics have described Spencer’s music as a collision of punk, garage rock, and blues, delivered with heavy distortion and theatrical stage presence. Writing in The Guardian, Dave Simpson noted that Spencer “helped redefine blues for an alternative audience” by mixing “the primitive thump of Mississippi hill country with New York noise and swagger.” His bands have drawn on sources ranging from Bo Diddley and James Brown to the abrasive energy of No Wave.
