= Punk blues =

Music genre

- Stylistic origins: Punk rock; proto-punk; blues; garage rock; blues rock
- Cultural origins: Early 1980s, United States

Other topics
- Timeline of punk rock; cowpunk; garage punk; psychobilly; biker metal

Punk blues (or blues punk) is a music genre that mixes elements of punk rock and blues. Punk blues musicians and bands usually incorporate elements of related styles, such as protopunk and blues rock. Its origins lie strongly within the garage rock sound of the 1960s and 1970s.

Punk blues can be said to favor the common rawness, simplicity and emotion shared between the punk and blues genres. Chet Weise, singer/guitarist of the Immortal Lee County Killers stated, "Punk and blues are both honest reactions to life. It's blues, it's our blues. It's just a bit turned up and a bit faster".

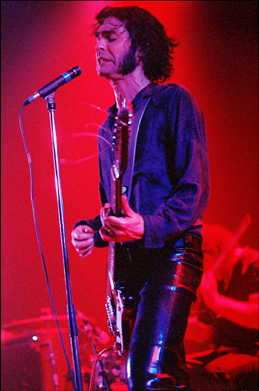
Jon Spencer

== Origins ==
Before the beginning of the punk movement of the late 1970s, several important forerunners such as the MC5, the Stooges, the Rolling Stones, the Who, the Sonics, Captain Beefheart, and the New York Dolls displayed a fascination with American blues.

AllMusic states that punk blues draws on the influence of the "garage rock sound of the mid-'60s, the primal howl of early Captain Beefheart, and especially in the raw and desperate sound of the Gun Club's landmark Fire of Love LP from 1981". Also according to AllMusic, "punk blues really came to life in the early '90s with bands like the seminal Jon Spencer Blues Explosion, the Oblivians, the Gories and the Gibson Brothers", and "continued into the 2000s with even more visibility thanks to the popularity of the White Stripes." John Doe of L.A. punk band X claims that the Gun Club and their frontman Jeffrey Lee Pierce invented a completely new style of music by mixing punk and blues.

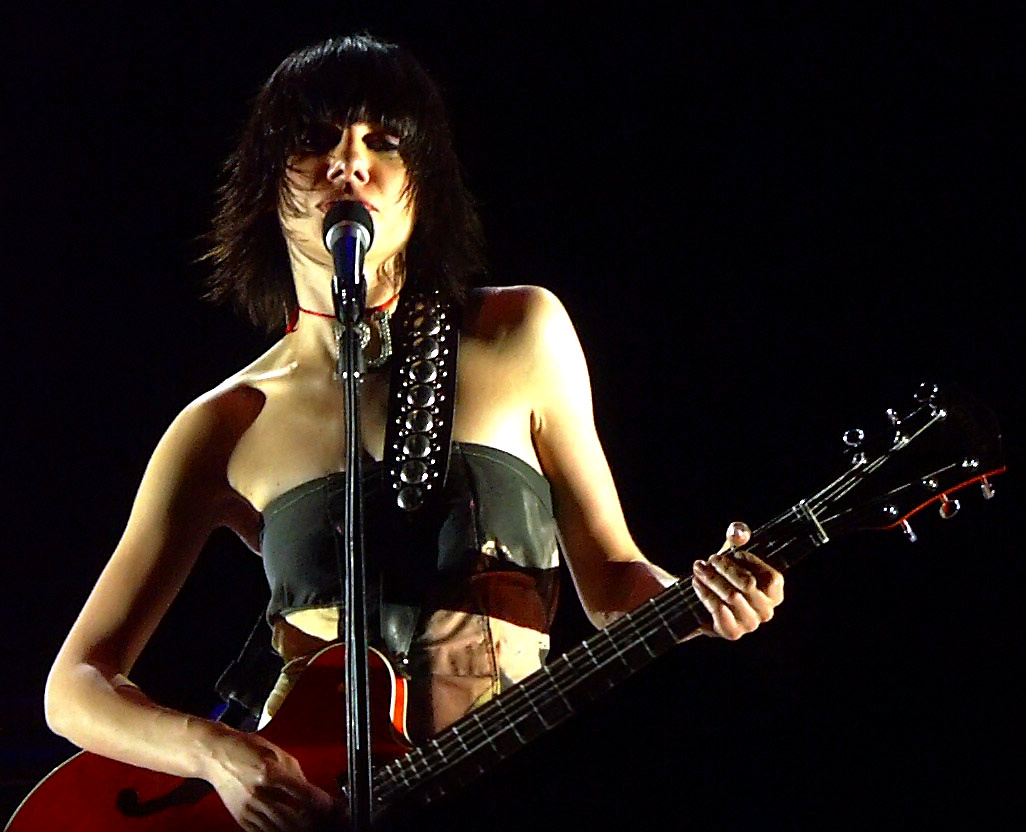
PJ Harvey

== Related bands ==
With their 1988 album Prison Bound, the punk band Social Distortion began incorporating rockabilly, country, and blues influences into their music. In the same time period, Rollins Band performed punk-inflected blues jams. In the early 1990s, British musician PJ Harvey also explored an avant-garde variant of the style.

American rock band L.A. Guns have been associated with the blues-punk sound. Particularly on their EP Wasted. The Detroit garage rock scene that bore bands such as the White Stripes, inspired by Flat Duo Jets, continues to thrive with punk blues musicians and bands that can be tied to the style, such as the Detroit Cobras, Geraldine, Mystery Girls, Soledad Brothers, the Von Bondies, and many others. The Memphis–Asheville band the Reigning Sound and the Boston band Mr. Airplane Man also plays in this style.

The indie rock bands the Kills and Deadboy & the Elephantmen have been associated by the media with a punk/blues sound. American rock band The Steel Crows are the most prominent contemporary band to be associated with this sound.

== See also ==
- List of punk blues musicians and bands
- Biker punk
- Cowpunk
- Noise rock
- Psychobilly
