= 100 Years Ago =

Song by the Rolling Stones

from the album Goats Head Soup
- Released: 31 August 1973
- Recorded: November–December 1972
- Genre: Funk rock
- Length: 3:59
- Label: Rolling Stones/Virgin
- Songwriter: Jagger–Richards
- Producer: Jimmy Miller

Goats Head Soup track listing
- 10 tracks Side one: 1. "Dancing with Mr. D"; 2. "100 Years Ago"; 3. "Coming Down Again"; 4. "Doo Doo Doo Doo Doo (Heartbreaker)"; 5. "Angie"; Side two: 6. "Silver Train"; 7. "Hide Your Love"; 8. "Winter"; 9. "Can You Hear the Music?"; 10. "Star Star"

"100 Years Ago" is a song by the English rock band the Rolling Stones featured on their 1973 album Goats Head Soup.

== Background ==
Credited to Mick Jagger and Keith Richards, guitarist Mick Taylor said at the time of its release, "Some of the songs we used (for the album) were pretty old. '100 Years Ago' was one that Mick [Jagger] had written two years ago and which we hadn't really got around to using before." The song is described by Tom Maginnis in his review as having a, "wistful air with a country lilt... before making several tempo shifts into a funky, sped-up groove..." The song's lyrics see Jagger reflect on aging:

Now all my friends is wearing worried smiles, Living out a dream of what they was; Don't you think it's sometimes wise not to grow up?

Went out walkin' through the wood the other day; Can't you see the furrows in my forehead? What tender days, we had no secrets hid away; Now it seems about a hundred years ago

The song then veers into a distinctive breakdown, slowing considerably before Jagger begins singing a verse in a noticeable drawl (beginning with the lyrics, "Call... Me... Lazybones... Ain't got no time to waste away"), before speeding back-up and turning into a funk jam of sorts.

Recording took place at Dynamic Sounds studio in Kingston, Jamaica, in November and December, 1972, with a final mix conducted in June 1973. Jagger performs lead vocals and is accompanied by Taylor on backing. Taylor performs the song's guitars while Keith Richards and Charlie Watts perform bass and drums, respectively. Nicky Hopkins provides piano while Billy Preston performs clavinet.

== Live performances ==
"100 Years Ago" was only played on the first two performances of European Tour of 1973, and has not been performed live since.

== Personnel ==
The Rolling Stones

- Mick Jagger – lead vocals
- Keith Richards – bass guitar
- Mick Taylor – electric guitars
- Charlie Watts – drums

Additional personnel

- Nicky Hopkins – piano
- Billy Preston – clavinet
