= Coming Down Again =

Song by the Rolling Stones

from the album Goats Head Soup
- Released: 31 August 1973
- Recorded: November & December 1972
- Studio: Dynamic Sounds, Kingston, Jamaica
- Genre: Rock
- Length: 5:54
- Label: Rolling Stones/Virgin
- Songwriter: Jagger–Richards
- Producer: Jimmy Miller

Goats Head Soup track listing
- 10 tracks Side one: 1. "Dancing with Mr. D"; 2. "100 Years Ago"; 3. "Coming Down Again"; 4. "Doo Doo Doo Doo Doo (Heartbreaker)"; 5. "Angie"; Side two: 6. "Silver Train"; 7. "Hide Your Love"; 8. "Winter"; 9. "Can You Hear the Music?"; 10. "Star Star"

"Coming Down Again" is a song by the Rolling Stones featured on their 1973 album Goats Head Soup. Keith Richards performs lead vocals.

Credited to Jagger/Richards, "Coming Down Again" is largely the work of Richards, who went as far as to say "'Coming Down Again' is my song" at the time of its release. A slower ballad similar in mood to another track on the album, "Angie", the lyrics tell of Richards' relationship with then-girlfriend Anita Pallenberg, who had chosen to abandon her romantic liaison with his friend and bandmate Brian Jones in favour of one with Richards.

Share your thoughts, there's nothing you can hide
She was dying to survive
I was caught, oh, taken for a ride
She was showing no surprise

Slipped my tongue in someone else's pie
Tasting better ev'ry time
He turned green and tried to make me cry
Being hungry, it ain't no crime

The song opens with Stones recording veteran Nicky Hopkins playing keyboards alongside a fluid, prominent bassline performed by Mick Taylor. Guitars are performed by Richards, who uses the wah-wah pedal for much of the song (an effect used often on Goats Head Soup), as well as Leslie speakers. Charlie Watts performs a "trademark start-stop drum arrangement ... that by now had become a familiar device." Bobby Keys performs a saxophone solo near the middle of the song. Jagger performs backing vocals.

Recorded at Dynamic Sounds studio in Kingston, Jamaica, in November and December, 1972, "Coming Down Again" is regarded as one of Richards' best lead vocal performances. Despite some popularity, Richards has never performed the song live on tour with the Rolling Stones.

== Personnel ==
The Rolling Stones

- Keith Richards – lead and backing vocals, electric guitars
- Mick Jagger – backing vocals
- Mick Taylor – bass guitar
- Charlie Watts – drums

Additional personnel

- Nicky Hopkins – piano
- Bobby Keys – baritone saxophone
- Jim Horn – alto saxophone
