= The Rolling Stones European Tour 1973 =

1973 concert tour by the Rolling Stones

The Rolling Stones 1973 European Tour
- Continental tour by The Rolling Stones
- Location: Europe
- Associated album: Goats Head Soup
- Start date: 1 September 1973
- End date: 19 October 1973
- Legs: 1
- No. of shows: 42

The Rolling Stones concert chronology
- Pacific Tour 1973; European Tour 1973; Tour of the Americas '75

The Rolling Stones 1973 European Tour was a concert tour of Great Britain and Continental Europe in September and October 1973 by The Rolling Stones.

== History ==
The tour followed the release of the group's album Goats Head Soup on 31 August. It began at the Stadthalle in Vienna, Austria on 1 September. It then saw, in large halls to mid-sized arenas, West Germany, England (including four shows at the Empire Pool in London), Scotland, Switzerland, Denmark, Sweden, The Netherlands, and Belgium, finishing on 19 October with the band's fourth entry into and thirteenth show in West Germany, at the Deutschlandhalle in West Berlin, which would turn out to be Mick Taylor's last live performance with the Stones as a member of the band. Altogether, 42 shows were played in 22 cities, with the band frequently playing two shows a day.

This was the Stones' first trip to Europe since the European Tour 1970 and was part of parallel three-year cycles of touring the United States and Europe.

== The shows ==
Without the media attention and jet set hangers-on of the group's 1972 American Tour, the 1973 European Tour was seen as having less drama — the biggest pending issue was the resolution of Keith Richards and Anita Pallenberg's 25 June drugs and weapons bust, which hung over them until a 24 October £205 fine from the Great Marlborough Street Magistrates Court resolved it — while showcasing consistently good musicianship. Songs like "Brown Sugar" and "Gimme Shelter" were well received and Billy Preston's organ and clavinet added a contemporary and funky edge to the "classic" Stones sound, although the tour's relatively conventional delineation between rhythm (primarily Richards) and lead guitar (primarily Taylor) parts were later criticised by Richards. By the time of the group's following Tour of the Americas '75, Ron Wood would be in the band and Richards' preferred interweaved approach would be restored.

== Recordings ==
No live album was released from the tour; a recording of the first 17 October show in Brussels was headed towards official release but was pulled back for legal reasons. As Brussels Affair (and some other names such as "Bedspring Symphony - A Box Lunch and Meat Whistle"), it has been a popular bootleg in superb stereo sound and is often considered a 'lost classic' of bigger importance than some of the official Stones' live albums. The album also included recordings from the September 9 show in London. These recordings were broadcast on the King Biscuit Flower Hour (KBFH). Another broadcast included three soundboard mono recordings from Newcastle, two from London, and one from Rotterdam.

In November 2011, the Rolling Stones launched a web enterprise, www.StonesArchive.com and released the second 17 October Brussels show with two tracks from the first Brussels show as Brussels Affair (Live 1973) worldwide as a digital download in FLAC or MP3 format and as a box set.

== Personnel ==
=== The Rolling Stones ===
- Mick Jagger – lead vocals, harmonica
- Keith Richards – rhythm and lead guitars, vocals
- Mick Taylor – rhythm and lead guitars
- Bill Wyman – bass guitar
- Charlie Watts – drums

=== Additional musicians ===
- Billy Preston – piano, organ, clavinet, backing vocals
- Steve Madaio – trumpet, flugelhorn
- Bobby Keys – saxophone (until 30 September 1973)
- Trevor Lawrence – saxophone
- Manuel Kellough – percussion (some dates)
- Marshall Chess – trumpet on "Street Fighting Man" (some dates)

Bobby Keys left the tour after the Frankfurt dates. In his memoir, he states that he left to clean up from drink and drugs to save his life.

== Tour support acts ==
Opening for the tour's shows was Billy Preston and for him, Kracker, the first band ever to be signed to Rolling Stones Records. Part of the opening show by Preston was released on Preston's 1974 album release Live European Tour, which featured Mick Taylor.

== Tour set list ==
The standard set list for the tour was:

1. "Brown Sugar"
2. "Gimme Shelter"
3. "Happy"
4. "Tumbling Dice"
5. "Star Star"
6. "Dancing with Mr D"
7. "Doo Doo Doo Doo Doo (Heartbreaker)" (not on all shows)
8. "Angie"
9. "You Can't Always Get What You Want"
10. "Midnight Rambler"
11. "Honky Tonk Women"
12. "All Down the Line"
13. "Rip This Joint"
14. "Jumpin' Jack Flash"
15. "Street Fighting Man"

This set list was stable once established; however, during the first few shows, Goats Head Soup tracks "100 Years Ago" (Vienna and Mannheim) and "Silver Train" (Vienna, Cologne, London 1st) got a trying out, as did "Bitch" and "Sweet Virginia" in Vienna. All of the pre-Goats selections had been played on the 1972 American Tour as well, and largely in the same order. Completely absent was anything from before 1968 in the Stones' catalog. On 18 August, before the tour began, Jagger had been quoted, "The only thing I don't really enjoy about playing live is having to perform the old numbers, even though that's what a lotta people wanna hear us do."

== Tour dates ==
Date	City	Country	Venue	Opening act(s)
1 September 1973	Vienna	Austria	Wiener Stadthalle	Kracker; Billy Preston
3 September 1973	Mannheim	West Germany	Eisstadion am Friedrichspark	Kracker; Billy Preston
4 September 1973; 2 shows	Cologne	West Germany	Sporthalle	Kracker; Billy Preston
7 September 1973	London	England	Empire Pool	Kracker; Billy Preston
8 September 1973; 2 shows	London	England	Empire Pool	Kracker; Billy Preston
9 September 1973	London	England	Empire Pool	Kracker; Billy Preston
11 September 1973	Manchester	England	Kings Hall	Kracker; Billy Preston
12 September 1973	Manchester	England	Kings Hall	Kracker; Billy Preston
13 September 1973; 2 shows	Newcastle upon Tyne	England	Newcastle City Hall	Kracker; Billy Preston
16 September 1973	Glasgow	Scotland	The Apollo	Kracker; Billy Preston
17 September 1973	Glasgow	Scotland	The Apollo	Kracker; Billy Preston
19 September 1973; 2 shows	Birmingham	England	Birmingham Odeon	Kracker; Billy Preston
23 September 1973	Innsbruck	Austria	Olympiahalle	Kracker; Billy Preston
25 September 1973	Bern	Switzerland	Festhalle	Kracker; Billy Preston
26 September 1973; 2 shows	Bern	Switzerland	Festhalle	Kracker; Billy Preston
28 September 1973; 2 shows	Munich	West Germany	Olympiahalle	Kracker; Billy Preston
30 September 1973; 2 shows	Frankfurt	West Germany	Festhalle Frankfurt	Kracker; Billy Preston
2 October 1973; 2 shows	Hamburg	West Germany	Ernst-Merck-Halle	Kracker; Billy Preston
4 October 1973; 2 shows	Aarhus	Denmark	Vejlby-Risskov Hallen	Kracker; Billy Preston
6 October 1973; 2 shows	Gothenburg	Sweden	Scandinavium	Kracker; Billy Preston
7 October 1973; 2 shows	Copenhagen	Denmark	Brøndbyhallen	Kracker; Billy Preston
9 October 1973	Essen	West Germany	Grugahalle	Kracker; Billy Preston
10 October 1973	Essen	West Germany	Grugahalle	Kracker; Billy Preston
11 October 1973	Essen	West Germany	Grugahalle	Kracker; Billy Preston
13 October 1973	Rotterdam	Netherlands	Sportpaleis Ahoy	Kracker; Billy Preston
14 October 1973; 2 shows	Rotterdam	Netherlands	Sportpaleis Ahoy	Kracker; Billy Preston
15 October 1973	Antwerp	Belgium	Antwerps Sportpaleis	Kracker; Billy Preston
17 October 1973; 2 shows	Brussels	Belgium	Forest National	Kracker; Billy Preston
19 October 1973	West Berlin	West Germany	Deutschlandhalle	Kracker; Billy Preston
