= The Tin Man Was a Dreamer =

Studio album by Nicky Hopkins
- Released: 23 April 1973
- Recorded: Late 1972 – January 1973
- Studio: Apple, London; Wally Heider, Los Angeles
- Genre: Pop rock
- Length: 37:19
- Label: Columbia
- Producer: Nicky Hopkins, David Briggs

Nicky Hopkins chronology
Jamming with Edward! (with Ry Cooder et al.) (1972)	The Tin Man Was a Dreamer (1973)	No More Changes (1975)

Singles from The Tin Man Was a Dreamer
- 1. "Speed On" Released: 28 May 1973 (US); 10 August 1973 (UK); 2. "Banana Anna"; 3. "Waiting for the Band"

The Tin Man Was a Dreamer is a studio album by English musician Nicky Hopkins, released in 1973 on Columbia Records. While Hopkins had long been well known for his distinctive, melodic style on piano and Wurlitzer electric piano, the album provided a rare opportunity to hear him sing, unlike his earlier solo releases The Revolutionary Piano of Nicky Hopkins and Jamming with Edward! The album was co-produced by Neil Young's regular producer, David Briggs, and featured contributions from George Harrison, Mick Taylor, Klaus Voormann and Hopkins's fellow Rolling Stones sidemen Bobby Keys and Jim Price.

== Recording ==
Having recently completed his duties on the Rolling Stones' "STP tour" of North America, Hopkins began work on his second official solo album in London during September 1972. Sessions took place at the Beatles' old Apple Studio, in short bursts between Hopkins's session work for what would be two major releases of 1973: George Harrison's Living in the Material World and the Stones' Goats Head Soup (the latter's held at Dynamic Sound in Kingston, Jamaica). All the material was written by Hopkins, alone or in collaboration with singer Jerry Lynn Williams. One of the solo compositions, "Edward", was a short, simplified take on the much-admired "Edward, the Mad Shirt Grinder", from Hopkins's days in Quicksilver Messenger Service (and released on their 1969 album Shady Grove).

Recording The Tin Man Was a Dreamer is said to have been a "weekend" activity, while the Harrison sessions took place on weekdays. From the Material World line-up, Klaus Voormann played bass on all tracks on the Hopkins album bar the piano-only opener, "Sundown in Mexico"; Harrison contributed lead (mostly slide) guitar to "Banana Anna", "Speed On", "Edward" and "Waiting for the Band"; and Jim Horn augmented the Bobby Keys–Jim Price horn section for "Speed On". Rolling Stone Mick Taylor played rhythm guitar on this last song and handled the guitar parts on "Dolly", "The Dreamer" and "Lawyer's Lament". For these last three tracks, orchestration was later overdubbed by Elton John's arranger, Del Newman. Repaying the favour from earlier in the year when Hopkins played on his own solo album, Keys also contributed to "Edward", "Speed On", "Banana Anna" and "Pig's Boogie".

Further recording was carried out in Los Angeles, prior to Hopkins's participation in the Rolling Stones' 1973 Far East tour. Following this, during March and April, he again worked with Harrison on the Ringo album, Ravi Shankar's Shankar Family & Friends, and Cheech & Chong's "Basketball Jones featuring Tyrone Shoelaces" – a trio of projects that featured Harrison in the role of, respectively, collaborator, producer and session guest.

== Release ==
The Tin Man Was a Dreamer was issued in April 1973 (delayed until July in Britain) with a brace of singles and a Columbia promotional campaign that posed the question, with reference to Hopkins's impressive credentials: "After albums with the Airplane, the Who, Jeff Beck, Fats Domino, John Lennon and the Rolling Stones, where can you possibly go?" Hopkins was very much in the music-press headlines at the time, in fact – but more for reasons related to his regular status as sideman rather than through the hoped-for solo success. The first example of this was in March, when he was asked to comment on whether the Ringo Starr sessions in Los Angeles might lead to a Beatles reunion. "All it was," Hopkins said of the Lennon–Harrison–Starr team-up, "was all the people turned up [in the studio], which has happened many times before in England. For example, Ringo worked on George's upcoming album and Harrison helped out on my own forthcoming solo album LP." While he quelled that particular rumour, in the other big story, concerning the Stones – specifically that Keith Richards was set to leave the band – he appeared to have played a different role. As the NME of 9 June would have it: "The story seems to have emanated from LA, where Nicky Hopkins reportedly told a US rock writer that Richards had been ousted by [Mick] Jagger ..."

== Reception ==
Professional ratings
Review scores
Source	Rating
AllMusic	4/5 stars

Although the album was overshadowed by speculation regarding Hopkins's famous friends and employers, The Tin Man Was a Dreamer attracted positive reviews, and is still well regarded among fans and critics alike.

Bruce Eder of AllMusic describes it as "engagingly edgy pop-rock – picture Elton John's early '70s work with more variety, a few rough edges, and a bit less ego". For Eder, the highlights are many: "Dolly", a "hauntingly beautiful" ballad; the instrumental "Edward"; a "pounding, pumping" rocker called "Speed On"; the "wittily scatological" second single, "Banana Anna"; "Lawyer's Lament" – specifically, its "exquisite harmonies" and Taylor's "sensitive lead playing"; and the "rollicking" closing track "Pig's Boogie", on which Chris Spedding contributed a guitar part.

While reviewing Harrison's contributions, Simon Leng calls the album "a fine collection of idiosyncratic pop songs and Southern hoedown" and identifies the best moments as "Banana Anna" ("a classic – or the classic – of English interpretations of Louisiana boogie"), "Sundown in Mexico" (for its "captivating moodscape"), "Lawyer's Lament", and the "irresistible" jaunt "Edward".

Long out of print, and following a period as a sought-after rarity, The Tin Man Was a Dreamer was issued on CD by Sony Japan in 1995.

== Track listing ==
All songs by Nicky Hopkins, except where noted.

Side one

1. "Sundown in Mexico" – 1:35
2. "Waiting for the Band" – 2:15
3. "Edward" – 5:20
4. "Dolly" (Hopkins, Jerry Lynn Williams) – 4:42
5. "Speed On" (Hopkins, Williams) – 3:59

Side two

6. "The Dreamer" – 5:47
7. "Banana Anna" (Hopkins, Williams) – 3:37
8. "Lawyer's Lament" (Hopkins, Williams) – 3:43
9. "Shout It Out" (Hopkins, Williams) – 3:39
10. "Pig's Boogie" – 2:42

== Personnel ==
- Nicky Hopkins – vocals, piano, organ
- Chris Rae – acoustic guitar
- Mike Egan – acoustic guitar
- Mick Taylor – acoustic and electric guitars
- Chris Spedding – electric guitar
- George Harrison – electric guitar, slide guitar (credited as George O'Hara)
- Klaus Voormann – bass
- Ray Cooper – congas, percussion
- Prairie Prince – drums
- Jerry Lynn Williams – vocals
- Bobby Keys – saxophones
- Jim Horn – saxophone
- Jim Price – trumpet
- Del Newman – string and brass arrangements

== Charts ==
=== Weekly charts ===
Weekly chart performance for The Tin Man Was a Dreamer
Chart (1973)	Peak position
US Billboard 200	108

== Sources ==
- Keith Badman, The Beatles Diary Volume 2: After the Break-Up 1970–2001, Omnibus Press (London, 2001; ISBN 0-7119-8307-0).
- Masimo Bonanno, The Rolling Stones Chronicle, Angus & Robertson (Sydney, NSW, 1990).
- Harry Castleman & Walter J. Podrazik, All Together Now: The First Complete Beatles Discography 1961–1975, Ballantine Books (New York, NY, 1976; ISBN 0-345-25680-8).
- The Editors of Rolling Stone, Harrison, Rolling Stone Press/Simon & Schuster (New York, NY, 2002; ISBN 0-7432-3581-9).
- Mick Jagger, Keith Richards, Charlie Watts & Ronnie Wood, According to the Rolling Stones, Weidenfeld & Nicolson (London, 2003; eds Dora Loewenstein & Philip Dodd).
- Simon Leng, While My Guitar Gently Weeps: The Music of George Harrison, Hal Leonard (Milwaukee, WI, 2006; ISBN 1-4234-0609-5).
- Bill Wyman, Rolling with the Stones, Dorling Kindersley (London, 2002; ISBN 0-7513-4646-2).
