= Silver Train (song) =

Song by the Rolling Stones

from the album Goats Head Soup
- A-side: "Angie"
- Released: 1973
- Genre: Rock; rock and roll; blues rock
- Length: 4:26
- Label: Rolling Stones/Atlantic
- Songwriter(s): Mick Jagger, Keith Richards
- Producer(s): Jimmy Miller

Goats Head Soup track listing
- 10 tracks Side one: 1. "Dancing with Mr. D"; 2. "100 Years Ago"; 3. "Coming Down Again"; 4. "Doo Doo Doo Doo Doo (Heartbreaker)"; 5. "Angie"; Side two: 6. "Silver Train"; 7. "Hide Your Love"; 8. "Winter"; 9. "Can You Hear the Music?"; 10. "Star Star"

"Silver Train" is a song by the English rock and roll band the Rolling Stones, from their 1973 album Goats Head Soup. The lyrics deal with the singer's relationship with a prostitute. Recording of the song had already begun in 1970 during sessions for Sticky Fingers. It also was the B-side of the single "Angie", which went to No. 1 in the US and top 5 in the UK.

== Reception ==
Rolling Stone critic Bud Scoppa had this to say of the song:

Side two begins modestly with "Silver Train," a rock & roll song with a pre-rock flavor. The Stones' approach is like their treatment of "Stop Breaking Down," one of Exile's sleepers: lots of whiny slide guitar and harp. They also emphasize, with their ragged ensemble shouts, the song's appealing chorus. "Train" is the best of the album's secondary songs.

== Covers ==
After hearing a demo of the tune, Johnny Winter recorded a cover of it for his album Still Alive and Well in 1973, months ahead of the Stones' release of Goats Head Soup.

The Black Crowes covered the song live. A cover of "Silver Train" also appears on the Carla Olson-Mick Taylor album Too Hot For Snakes, which was released in 1991.

== Live performances ==
The Rolling Stones played the song in concerts in 1973, but did not perform it again until 2014's 14 On Fire tour with Mick Taylor, who played on the original recording, as a special guest.

== Personnel ==
The Rolling Stones

- Mick Jagger – lead and backing vocals, electric guitar, harmonica
- Keith Richards – backing vocals, electric guitar, bass guitar
- Mick Taylor – backing vocals, electric guitar
- Charlie Watts – drums

Additional personnel

- Ian Stewart – piano
