= Brussels Affair (Live 1973) =

Live album by the Rolling Stones
- Released: 18 October 2011
- Recorded: 17 October 1973
- Genre: Rock
- Length: 79:33
- Languages: English, French
- Label: Promotone BV

The Rolling Stones chronology
| The Singles 1971–2006 (2011) | Brussels Affair (Live 1973) (2011) | Some Girls: Live in Texas '78 (2011) |

Brussels Affair (Live 1973) is a live album by the Rolling Stones, released in 2011. It is compiled from two shows (mainly from the second show) recorded in Brussels at the Forest National Arena on Wednesday 17 October 1973, during their European Tour. At the time, the band was unable to enter France, as guitarist Keith Richards had been temporarily banned from visiting the country after being charged with drug possession by a French court. The album was released exclusively as a digital download through Google Play Music on 18 October 2011 in the US and through the Rolling Stones Archive website for the rest of the world in both lossy MP3 and lossless FLAC format. The 2011 digital edition has been bootlegged on physical CD. On 29 August 2012, an official announcement was made, stating its physical release as a high-priced boxset (from $750 to $1,500 depending on the edition). All three releases include a triple LP and double CD.

Brussels Affair (Live 1973) was officially released on a two-disc CD in Japan in 2015 as a bonus of the CD/DVD Set "Marquee Club (live 1971)" (Deluxe limited edition; Ward Records / Eagle Vision). The same 15 Brussels tracks also appear on the 2020 Super Deluxe (3 CDs + Blu-ray disc; Polydor / Rolling Stones Records 088 503-2) and Deluxe (4 LP; Polydor / Rolling Stones Records 089 398-1) box set reissue of Goats Head Soup.

The title of the release is the same as that of several famous and widely known bootleg recordings. The most famous iteration consists principally of the early show as broadcast by the King Biscuit Flower Hour (with "Starfucker" omitted due to its lyrical content) and several bonus tracks ("Gimme Shelter", "Happy", "Doo Doo Doo Doo Doo (Heartbreaker)" and "Street Fighting Man") added from the Tuesday 9 September 1973 London show. The official 2011 release is mainly culled from the second Brussels show; however, "Brown Sugar", "Midnight Rambler" and a transposed guitar solo on "All Down the Line" were taken from the first show.

== Concert film clips ==
On 8 September 2020, the concert footage of the live album was officially released for the first time, in any format, on streaming services such as YouTube. The videos are short clips that keep repeating as the live album plays.

== Overview ==
The album was recorded during their 1973 European Tour, promoting their latest album Goats Head Soup.

In 1973, the Rolling Stones were banned from entering France due to pending drug cases against Keith Richards, Bobby Keys and Anita Pallenberg. The band decided to organise a concert in Brussels for the French audience; RTL Radio chartered a train for French fans.

== Critical reception ==
Professional ratings
Review scores
| Source | Rating |
|---|---|
| AllMusic | 4.5/5 stars |
| Uncut | 4/5 stars |
| Vice (Expert Witness) | (2-star Honorable Mention) |

Reviewing for Vice, Robert Christgau cited "Starfucker" and "Happy" as highlights, and wrote of the album, "The rare arena-rock recording that does justice to the subgenre's power dwarfs their 26 March 1971 Marquee Club vault-pull while making a case for the excision of 'Midnight Rambler' and 'Brown Sugar' from their A list". John Harris was more enthusiastic about the release, writing in The Guardian that it is "unimpeachably great: a beautifully recorded, often unhinged 70 minutes during which the Stones manage to sound like the Platonic ideal of a rock band: simultaneously tight, unhinged, absolutely convincing, and gloriously ludicrous."

== Track listing ==
All tracks are written by Mick Jagger & Keith Richards

| No. | Title | Length |
|---|---|---|
| 1. | "Brown Sugar" | 3:54 |
| 2. | "Gimme Shelter" | 5:31 |
| 3. | "Happy" | 3:13 |
| 4. | "Tumbling Dice" | 5:02 |
| 5. | "Star Star" | 4:15 |
| 6. | "Dancing with Mr. D." | 4:36 |
| 7. | "Doo Doo Doo Doo Doo (Heartbreaker)" | 5:01 |
| 8. | "Angie" | 5:13 |
| 9. | "You Can't Always Get What You Want" | 10:57 |
| 10. | "Midnight Rambler" | 12:49 |
| 11. | "Honky Tonk Women" | 3:10 |
| 12. | "All Down the Line" | 4:19 |
| 13. | "Rip This Joint" | 2:24 |
| 14. | "Jumpin' Jack Flash" | 3:26 |
| 15. | "Street Fighting Man" | 5:13 |
| Total length: | | 79:33 |

== Personnel ==
The Rolling Stones

- Mick Jagger – lead vocals, harmonica
- Keith Richards – guitar, vocals
- Mick Taylor – guitar, slide guitar
- Bill Wyman – bass guitar
- Charlie Watts – drums

Additional musicians

- Billy Preston – piano, organ, clavinet, background vocals
- Steve Madaio – trumpet, flugelhorn
- Trevor Lawrence – saxophone

Technical personnel

- Bob Clearmountain – mixing

== Charts ==
Chart performance for Brussels Affair (Live 1973)
| Chart (2026) | Peak position |
|---|---|
| Belgian Albums (Ultratop Flanders) | 43 |
| Belgian Albums (Ultratop Wallonia) | 139 |
| Dutch Albums (Album Top 100) | 84 |
| French Physical Albums (SNEP) | 34 |
| French Rock & Metal Albums (SNEP) | 21 |
| Japanese Albums (Oricon) | 89 |
| Swiss Albums (Schweizer Hitparade) | 99 |
