= Dancing with Mr. D. =

Song by the Rolling Stones

from the album Goats Head Soup
- A-side: "Doo Doo Doo Doo Doo (Heartbreaker)"
- Released: 31 August 1973
- Recorded: November–December 1972
- Genre: Funk rock; blues rock
- Length: 4:53
- Label: Rolling Stones/Virgin
- Songwriter: Jagger–Richards
- Producer: Jimmy Miller

Goats Head Soup track listing
- 10 tracks Side one: 1. "Dancing with Mr. D"; 2. "100 Years Ago"; 3. "Coming Down Again"; 4. "Doo Doo Doo Doo Doo (Heartbreaker)"; 5. "Angie"; Side two: 6. "Silver Train"; 7. "Hide Your Love"; 8. "Winter"; 9. "Can You Hear the Music?"; 10. "Star Star"

"Dancing with Mr. D." is the opening track of the English rock and roll band the Rolling Stones' 1973 album Goats Head Soup.

== Background ==
Written by Mick Jagger and Keith Richards, "Dancing with Mr. D." is a brooding rocker in line with much of the Stones' funk inspired recordings from the Goats Head Soup era. The song opens with a riff by Richards prominently repeated throughout the song. Jagger's lyrics allude to either dalliance with a succubus or Death;

Down in the graveyard where we have our tryst,
The air smells sweet, the air smells sick;
He never smiles, his mouth merely twists,
The breath in my lungs feels clinging and thick;
But I know his name, he's called Mr. D,
And one of these days, he's going to set you free;
Human skulls is hanging right around his neck,
The palms of my hands is clammy and wet

Jagger's lyrics are somewhat more self reflective than the devil imagery he adopted since "Sympathy for the Devil". The chorus contrasts with the lyrics with backing vocals by the group and its steady rhythm.

The song would best serve as an introduction to the Stones' studio-based sound of the mid-1970s after the sprawling epic Exile on Main St. Recording began at Dynamic Sounds studio in Kingston, Jamaica, and would continue at Village Recorders in Los Angeles and Island Recording Studios in London. Billy Preston, who had contributed on a few songs with the Stones in the past, would become a heavy collaborator over the next few albums and here performs clavinet. Nicky Hopkins highlights with pianos throughout while Rebop Kwaku Baah and Pascal perform percussion. Mick Taylor performs electric slide guitar as well as bass while Charlie Watts performs drums.

== Critical reception ==
Tom Maginnis of Allmusic said of the song that it "can only be viewed as mediocre by the Stones' impossibly high standards by this point". Bud Scoppa of Rolling Stone was more critical, calling the song "hopelessly silly" as well as "the weakest opener ever so positioned on one of their albums, and they’ve never performed with less conviction."

== Live performances ==
"Dancing with Mr. D." has been performed by the Stones on their 1973 tour of Europe and on five shows of their 2017 No Filter Tour. It served as the B-side to album mate "Doo Doo Doo Doo Doo (Heartbreaker)". A live version is available on the bonus disc of the "HONK" album. This version was recorded at the GelreDome in Arnhem on October 15, 2017.

== Personnel ==
The Rolling Stones

- Mick Jagger – lead and backing vocals
- Keith Richards – backing vocals, electric guitar
- Mick Taylor – backing vocals, electric guitar, bass guitar
- Charlie Watts – drums

Additional personnel

- Nicky Hopkins – piano
- Anthony Kwaku Baah – percussion
- Nicholas Pascal Raicevic – percussion
- Billy Preston – clavinet
