= Winter (Rolling Stones song) =

Song by the Rolling Stones

from the album Goats Head Soup
- Released: 31 August 1973
- Recorded: November–December 1972
- Genre: Country rock
- Length: 5:31
- Label: Rolling Stones/Virgin
- Songwriter: Mick Jagger/Keith Richards
- Producer: Jimmy Miller

Goats Head Soup track listing
- 10 tracks Side one: 1. "Dancing with Mr. D"; 2. "100 Years Ago"; 3. "Coming Down Again"; 4. "Doo Doo Doo Doo Doo (Heartbreaker)"; 5. "Angie"; Side two: 6. "Silver Train"; 7. "Hide Your Love"; 8. "Winter"; 9. "Can You Hear the Music?"; 10. "Star Star"

"Winter" is a song by the English rock and roll band the Rolling Stones featured on their 1973 album Goats Head Soup. Credited to singer Mick Jagger and guitarist Keith Richards, the song was actually composed by Jagger with the band's lead guitarist at the time, Mick Taylor. It was the first track recorded for the album and does not feature Richards.

== Background ==
About the song, Bill Janovitz says in his review, "Here they were in sunny Jamaica, and the Stones were writing and recording an entirely convincing and evocative picture of a Northern Hemisphere winter. Perhaps they were so happy to be escaping the season they felt that starting the sessions with 'Winter' could transition them out of the old and into the new climate. Though it bemoans many of the negatives of the season [in the] lyrics ... [it] seems to simultaneously celebrate the season as something inherently beautiful, with other evocations of holiday scenes and wanting to wrap a coat and keep a lover warm."

It's sure been a hard, hard winter; My feet, they're draggin' 'cross the ground; And I hope it's gonna be a long, hot summer; And the light o' love will be burnin' bright

And I wish I'd been out in California, When the lights on all the Christmas trees went out; But I been burnin' my bell, book and candle, And the Restoration plays have all gone 'round

Recording began at Kingston's Dynamic Sounds studio in November and continued into December 1972. Jagger opens the song with the rhythm guitar piece and is accompanied by Taylor's "country-like licks" on lead. Taylor also plays slide guitar. Nicky Hopkins performs the song's accompanying piano while Bill Wyman and Charlie Watts perform bass and drums, respectively. The strings were arranged by Nicky Harrison.

Despite his considerable contribution to the song, Taylor never received official credit from Jagger or Richards.

== Reception ==
In 2004, British actor Bill Nighy picked "Winter" as his favourite track on the BBC's radio show, Desert Island Discs.

== In popular culture ==
The song was featured in the series finale of the CBS drama Cold Case on 2 May 2010.

== Personnel ==
The Rolling Stones

- Mick Jagger – lead vocals, rhythm guitar
- Mick Taylor – lead guitar, slide guitar
- Bill Wyman – bass guitar
- Charlie Watts – drums

Additional personnel

- Nicky Hopkins – piano
- Nicky Harrison – string arrangement

== Other recordings ==
Carla Olson and Mick Taylor recorded two versions of "Winter". One is on Olson's The Ring of Truth album and the other appears on Too Hot For Snakes Plus. (One disc was a re-release of the Olson/Taylor Too Hot for Snakes live album and the second was thirteen studio tracks featuring the two from Olson's various solo albums plus one song from the Barry Goldberg album Stoned Again which she produced).
