= Angie (song) =

Single by the Rolling Stones

from the album Goats Head Soup
- B-side: "Silver Train"
- Released: 20 August 1973
- Recorded: November–December 1972, Dynamic Sounds Studio; Kingston, Jamaica
- Genre: Soft rock; glam rock
- Length: 4:33
- Label: Rolling Stones
- Songwriter: Jagger–Richards
- Producer: Jimmy Miller

The Rolling Stones singles chronology
"Happy" (1972)	"Angie" (1973)	"Doo Doo Doo Doo Doo (Heartbreaker)" (1973)

Alternative cover
- German picture sleeve

Goats Head Soup track listing
- 10 tracks Side one: 1. "Dancing with Mr. D"; 2. "100 Years Ago"; 3. "Coming Down Again"; 4. "Doo Doo Doo Doo Doo (Heartbreaker)"; 5. "Angie"; Side two: 6. "Silver Train"; 7. "Hide Your Love"; 8. "Winter"; 9. "Can You Hear the Music?"; 10. "Star Star"

"Angie" is a song by the English rock band the Rolling Stones, featured on their eleventh studio album Goats Head Soup (1973). It also was the lead single from the album, released on 20 August 1973.

== Background ==
The song is credited, as most Rolling Stones songs are, to both Mick Jagger and Keith Richards. "Angie" was recorded in November and December 1972 and is an acoustic guitar-driven ballad characterizing the end of a romance. The song's distinctive piano accompaniment, written by Richards, was played on the album by Nicky Hopkins, a Rolling Stones recording-session regular. The strings on the piece (as well as on another song, "Winter") were arranged by Nicky Harrison. An unusual feature of the original recording is that singer Mick Jagger's vocal guide track (made before the final vocals were performed) is faintly audible throughout the song (an effect sometimes called a "ghost vocal"). Cash Box said that "Jagger is at his best—slurring words by the dozens to ring out the feeling of every important line." Record World called it a "tender ballad" on which "Mick Jagger's vocal is moving and sensuous."

Released as a single in August 1973, "Angie" debuted at No. 75 on the Billboard Hot 100 singles chart and eventually made it to No.1 for the week ending October 20 – their seventh and penultimate (before "Miss You" in 1978) chart topper on the Hot 100. It went to No. 5 on the UK singles chart. The song was also a No. 1 hit in both Canada and Australia for five weeks each and topped the charts in many countries throughout Europe and the rest of the world.

Because of the song's length, some radio stations made edits to shorten it to 3 minutes, omitting the longer coda and the second instrumental section of the song.

There was speculation that the song was about David Bowie's first wife Angela, Keith Richards' newborn daughter Dandelion Angela, the actress Angie Dickinson, and others. In 1993, in an interview for the liner notes to the Rolling Stones' compilation album Jump Back: The Best of the Rolling Stones, Richards said that the title was inspired by his baby daughter. However, in his 2010 memoir Life, Richards said that he had chosen the name at random when writing the song—before he knew that his baby would be named Angela or even knew that his baby would be a girl—and that the song "was not about any particular person". According to NME, Jagger's contributions to the lyrics referred to his breakup with Marianne Faithfull.

The Rolling Stones have frequently performed the song in concert; it's included in set lists on their 1973, 1975 and 1976 tours; it's available on two of their "Vault" recorded concerts including 1973 Brussels Affair (using electric guitars with Mick Taylor soloing) and Live at the L.A. Forum 1975 (played by Keith Richards and Ron Wood acoustically). It has been a touring staple since their 1982 European Tour. Concert renditions were released on the albums Stripped, Live Licks and The Rolling Stones: Havana Moon.

== Cover versions ==
"Angie" was covered by the American musical duo Womack & Womack on their 1983 album "Love Wars". Also, it was covered by Welsh rock band Stereophonics in 1999, as the B-side to the single "Hurry Up and Wait". The song was also included on the 2010 deluxe re-issue of their 1999 second studio album Performance and Cocktails..

== Personnel ==
According to authors Philippe Margotin and Jean-Michel Guesdon:

The Rolling Stones

- Mick Jagger – vocals
- Keith Richards – acoustic guitar
- Mick Taylor – acoustic guitar
- Bill Wyman – bass
- Charlie Watts – drums

Additional personnel

- Nicky Hopkins – piano
- Nicky Harrison – string arrangement

== Music video ==
Two music videos were shot to promote the song.

== Charts ==
=== Weekly charts ===
Chart (1973–1974)	Peak position
Australia (Kent Music Report)	1
Austria (Ö3 Austria Top 40)	8
Belgium (Ultratop 50 Flanders)	1
Canada (RPM) Top Singles	1
Canada (RPM) Adult Contemporary	39
Denmark (Tracklisten)	4
Finland (Suomen virallinen lista)	16
France (IFOP)	1
Germany (GfK)	2
Ireland (IRMA)	9
Italy (Hit Parade)	1
Netherlands (Single Top 100)	1
New Zealand (Recorded Music NZ)	2
Norway (VG-lista)	1
South Africa (Springbok)	2
Spain (AFE)	4
Switzerland (Schweizer Hitparade)	1
UK Singles (Official Charts)	5
US Billboard Hot 100	1
US Billboard Adult Contemporary	38
US Cash Box Top 100	1

=== Year-end charts ===
Chart (1973)	Rank
Australia	19
Canada	6
Netherlands (Single Top 100)	2
Switzerland	2
US Billboard	85
US Cash Box Top 100	69

== Certifications and sales ==
Region	Certification	Certified units/sales
Australia (ARIA)	2× Platinum	140,000^{‡}
France (SNEP)	Gold	700,000
Italy (FIMI) sales since 2009	Gold	25,000^{‡}
New Zealand (RMNZ)	2× Platinum	60,000^{‡}
Spain (Promusicae)	Platinum	60,000^{‡}
United Kingdom (BPI)	Silver	250,000^{^}
United States (RIAA)	Gold	1,000,000^{^}
^{^} Shipments figures based on certification alone.^{‡} Sales+streaming figures based on certification alone.
