= Killing of Clifford Glover =

1973 police shooting of a child in New York City

- Date: April 28, 1973
- Time: 5 a.m.
- Location: New York City, New York, United States
- Type: Homicide by shooting
- Participants: Thomas Shea (shooter)
- Charges: Murder
- Verdict: Not guilty

Clifford Glover was a 10-year-old African American boy who was fatally shot by Thomas Shea, an on-duty, undercover policeman, on April 28, 1973. Glover's death, and Shea's later acquittal of a charge of murder, led to riots in the South Jamaica section of Queens, New York.

== Shooting ==
At 5 a.m. on April 28, 1973, 10-year-old Clifford Glover was shot when he decided to join his stepfather for some work on a weekend, and his stepfather was stopped by two undercover officers, Thomas Shea, and his partner Walter Scott. The two officers believed the boy and his stepfather had just committed a robbery. Glover and his stepfather were afraid of the two officers and ran from them, believing they themselves were about to be harmed.

Shea testified that he drew fire on the boy who appeared to have a weapon. Glover was hit by at least two bullets. When Glover was hit, the officers claimed his father took the alleged weapon from him, which was never recovered. According to Scott, the boy told him, "Fuck you, you're not taking me".

== Rioting ==
Immediately following the shooting, there were several days of riots in the South Jamaica neighborhood. At least 24 people, including 14 policemen, were injured; in addition, 25 protesters were arrested.

There were also smaller demonstrations accusing Shea of racism outside the courthouse during the trial. The day after Shea was acquitted, hundreds of people began a riot, turning over cars, breaking windows, and stealing cash registers; one protester was arrested in the aftermath, and rioters injured two police officers.

== Trial ==
Thomas Shea was put on trial for murder. The jury of 11 white people and one black person acquitted Shea. He was the first New York City police officer ever to be tried for murder while on duty. Shea was declared not guilty on June 12, 1974.

== Cultural impact ==
The killing of Clifford Glover and the subsequent acquittal of Thomas Shea feature prominently in "Power", a 1975 poem by Caribbean-American poet Audre Lorde and "NYC Cops", a 2012 song by rapper Heems. The Rolling Stones reference the shooting in their 1973 song "Doo Doo Doo Doo Doo (Heartbreaker)" on the album Goat's Head Soup. The Progressive Labor Party released a song titled "Clifford Glover", a protest and recruitment song. Thomas Hauser writes about the shooting and the investigation in detail in The Trial of Patrolman Thomas Shea, which was published by Seven Stories Press in June, 2017.

== See also ==
- List of unarmed African Americans killed by law enforcement officers in the United States
