= The Revolutionary Piano of Nicky Hopkins =

Studio album by Nicky Hopkins
- Released: 1966
- Genre: Pop rock
- Length: 34:11
- Label: CBS
- Producer: Shel Talmy

Nicky Hopkins chronology
The Revolutionary Piano of Nicky Hopkins (1966)	Jamming with Edward! (1972)

The Revolutionary Piano of Nicky Hopkins is a studio album made by the English musician and session pianist Nicky Hopkins and produced by Shel Talmy. It was released in 1966 by CBS Records. It was described as an "orchestrated, easy-listening collection of standards" by Ultimate Classic Rock. The album contains multiple remastered versions of songs, such as Yesterday by The Beatles. The album was later released as a CD on March 6, 1995, by Sony Music.

Professional ratings
Review scores
Source	Rating
AllMusic	2/5 stars

== Track listing ==
A Side
No.	Title	Writer(s)	Length
1.	"Mr. Big"	Whitaker, Hopkins	2:28
2.	"Yesterday"	Lennon, McCartney	4:11
3.	"Goldfinger"	Newley, Barry, Bricusse	2:20
4.	"Don't Get Around Much Anymore"	Ellington	3:02
5.	"Jenni"	Hopkins	2:33
6.	"Acapulco 22"	Allan, Talmy	2:21
Total length:			16:55

B Side
No.	Title	Writer(s)	Length
1.	"You Came a Long Way from St. Louis"	Russell, Brooks	2:35
2.	"Love Letters"	Heyman, Young	2:38
3.	"The Unlonely Bull"	Whitaker, Hopkins	2:40
4.	"Satisfaction"	Jagger, Richards	3:08
5.	"Paris Bells"	Birchell	2:54
6.	"The Ilejistry Pig"	Hopkins	3:29
Total length:			17:24
