= Jamming with Edward! =

1972 studio album

Studio album by Ry Cooder, Nicky Hopkins, Mick Jagger, Bill Wyman, Charlie Watts
- Released: 7 January 1972
- Recorded: 23 April 1969, Olympic Studio, London, United Kingdom
- Genre: Rock
- Length: 36:05
- Language: English
- Label: Rolling Stones
- Producer: Glyn Johns

Ry Cooder chronology
Boomer's Story (1972)	Jamming with Edward! (1972)	Paradise and Lunch (1974)

Nicky Hopkins chronology
Sweet Thursday	Jamming With Edward! (1972)	The Tin Man Was a Dreamer (1973)

The Rolling Stones chronology
Hot Rocks 1964-1971 (1971)	Jamming With Edward! (1972)	Milestones (1972)

Jamming with Edward! is a 1972 album by three Rolling Stones band members (Mick Jagger, Charlie Watts and Bill Wyman) accompanied by Nicky Hopkins and Ry Cooder, capturing an impromtpu jam session dating from 1969.

== Background ==
The album was recorded at London's Olympic Studio on April 23, 1969, during the Let It Bleed sessions, and released on Rolling Stones Records in 1972. It consists of a series of loose jams performed by band members while waiting for Keith Richards to return to the studio. The reason for Richards' absence is uncertain; although it is commonly believed that he walked out over Cooder being brought in as a support guitarist, producer Glyn Johns has attributed his absence to a phone call from his girlfriend Anita Pallenberg. Although Jamming with Edward! reached No. 33 on the US charts in February 1972 during an 11-week stay, it failed to make the UK listings.

"Edward" is a nickname for pianist Nicky Hopkins, originating from some earlier studio conversation between Hopkins and another Rolling Stone, Brian Jones. Hopkins also contributed the cover art. In the original liner notes, Mick Jagger describes the album as "a nice piece of bullshit... which we cut one night in London, England while waiting for our guitar player to get out of bed. It was promptly forgotten (which may have been for the better) ... I hope you spend longer listening to this record than we did recording it." On the CD version there are additional notes written by Mark Paytress adding more context and describing the result as a "curio to top all curios, perhaps".

Johns said of the album: "[It] was just a joke really, just a laugh. I recorded it and they played it, and then, I don't know how long later, we dug the tapes out, I mixed it and they stuck it out on album. It didn't really warrant releasing really, but it was okay, a bit of fun, and there's some good playing on it."

According to Rolling Stone, the release was delayed for several months due to the appearance of an expletive on the back cover art, which was partially covered with stars in the ultimate release.

== Remaster ==
Jamming with Edward! was remastered and reissued by Virgin Records in 1995.

== Critical reception ==
=== Contemporary reviews ===
Don Ottenhoff of The Grand Rapids Press dismissed the "generally lack-lustre album" as undeserving of its large promotional campaign, believing that the core idea to gather musicians and "just [let] the tapes run", thus capturing a more personal, informal side of the players than on proper Rolling Stones albums, was let down by the album resembling "a thousand other bands who get together in somebody's basement to jam." Ottenhoff compared it to another "insipid jam record", George Harrison's Apple Jam (1970), as both are closer to "phonographic fan [magazines] than anything else", and complained that the mixing made the album resemble an old, scratchy 78rpm record. Jerry Kholer of The Kansas City Star described it as a occasionally good but sometimes very bad edit of a two-hour jam session that should have run longer to allow for better material, and felt that, even for a jam session album, it contains "too many lows". The highlight of the album, according to Kholer, is Hopkins' "outstanding piano work", praising his inventive, versatile styles of rock, blues and boogie woogie for rescuing several tracks.

Staten Island Advance critic Chuck Schmidt wrote that the album succeeds as an "appetizer", assuaging audiences waiting for the Rolling Stones' next studio album, and commenting that although an impromptu recording session credited to its contributing musicians, it is satisfying for sounding "so distinctively Rolling Stones". Schmidt believed the album's greatest strength was showcasing the overlooked musicianship of Watts and Wyman, who are central to the recording. Robert Murphy of The Daily Breeze deemed it a "spontaneous yet structured, subtle yet memorable" piece of music that perfectly showcases all the contributing musicians, praising it for being a "no-waste package of relaxing talent", and considered it superior to other jam albums such as Apple Jam, Super Session and Moby Grape's Grape Jam (both 1968), which sound "hopelessly rehearsed" in comparison. Walter Borawski wrote in his Poughkeepsie Journal review that Hopkins is the "spectacular" highlight of an almost wholly formless album of jam sessions that only end when the musicians tire of them, further praising Cooder and Watts for contributing "some of their best work ever".

Some critics noted that Jamming with Edward! was recorded or mixed badly, with Jagger's vocals obscured and distorted, resembling the sound of a muffled telephone conversation. Kholer noted that the "badly distorted" vocals are explainable by Jagger singing his vocals into a harmonica microphone. Winston-Salem Journal critic Jim Shirtzer considered the album similar to bootleg recordings of the late 1960s, albeit mostly better recorded. Shirtzer generally praised the "relaxed and casual" album, particularly highlighting the jam treatment of "It Hurts Me Too", and believed that despite its flaws, the album was "the only behind-the-scenes glimpse" that the Rolling Stones had offered of their music. The New York Times said that Jagger's vocals were the main selling point, but as they sound as though sung through an "empty popcorn box", they do not justify the purchase of "a meandering boredom-barrage of cliches" like Jamming with Edward!, dismissing the record's tune-ups, false starts, solos and four-bar blues. Others opined that the low retail price was, or could be construed as, an indicator of low-quality material.

=== Retrospective appraisal ===
Professional ratings
Review scores
Source	Rating
AllMusic	1.5/5 stars
Christgau's Record Guide	C

Robert Christgau, writing in Christgau's Record Guide (1981), reinforced complaints about Jamming with Edward!'s "lousy" vocal mix, average playing and "all but nonexistent composition," conceding that only collectors would buy the discount-priced set. Steve Kurutz of AllMusic pans the album's unrehearsed style as "more of a hindrance than a call to ragged glory", writing that the ensemble stumble through covers and keyboard-driven originals that remain unimpressive for sounding "thrown together during a drunken night's rehearsals", resulting in an album that is "a bit of a letdown." Jeff Giles of Ultimate Classic Rock, noting the oddity of a Rolling Stones breaking the Top 40 of the Billboard charts without Richards, comments that the album "represented more of a peek behind the scenes than a truly necessary purchase for any but the most ardent Stones completist, but like much of what the band recorded during its classic era, it's a piece of work that benefits from a certain ragged, boozy charm."

Following its 1995 CD reissue, The Daily Gleaner critic Wilfred Langmaid said the album shows skillful jamming, with Hopkins front and centre, and is a "nice little addition to the Rolling Stones discography", further justifying the "self-indulgence" of "Interlude a La Tengo" and "Highland Fling" because, as the recording captures an informal, late-night jam session, "album release was the last thing on these players' minds in those after midnight hours." North Bay Nugget's Jeff Baxter spotlit the fun nature of the tapes and wrote that fans of the style of the jams would find them "extremely catchy and enjoyable." In 2005, Santa Barbara News-Press included the album alongside Goats Head Soup (1973) and Undercover (1983) in their list of classic Rolling Stones albums that should have been "contenders". Describing Jamming with Edward! as overlooked rather than underrated, the newspaper highlight its leisurely place and opine that the absence of Richards' guitar allows both the solid Watts–Wyman rhythm section and Hopkins' "stellar" piano work to be fore-fronted. They also dismissed hardcore fans who believed the album was a "tedious exercise" that should not have been released, claiming that they would praise it if it existed solely as a bootleg. Lin Bensley of Record Collector noted the "questionable audio quality" but opined that the album demonstrates the improvisational skills of its contributors, despite paling in comparison next to the "purple passages" throughout Hopkins' solo album The Tin Man Was a Dreamer (1973).

== Track listing ==
All tracks are written by Ry Cooder, Nicky Hopkins and Charlie Watts, except where noted.

Side one
No.	Title	Length
1.	"The Boudoir Stomp"	5:13
2.	"It Hurts Me Too" (Elmore James/Mel London; original version: Tampa Red, 1941; includes a quotation from "Pledging My Time" (Bob Dylan))	5:12
3.	"Edward's Thrump Up"	8:11

Side two
No.	Title	Length
4.	"Blow with Ry"	11:05
5.	"Interlude a la El Hopo" (Includes a quotation from "The Loveliest Night of the Year" [Webster, Ross])	2:04
6.	"Highland Fling"	4:20

== Personnel ==
- Ry Cooder – guitar
- Mick Jagger – harmonica, vocals
- Charlie Watts – drums
- Nicky Hopkins – keyboards, piano
- Bill Wyman – bass guitar

== Chart performance ==
Chart (1972)	Peak position
Dutch Albums Chart	7
US Billboard Top LPs	33
