= The Rolling Stones Pacific Tour 1973 =

1973 concert tour by the Rolling Stones

The Rolling Stones Australian Tour 1973
- Tour by The Rolling Stones
- Poster from Australian portion of tour, designed by Ian McCausland
- Location: North America; Oceania
- Start date: 18 January 1973
- End date: 27 February 1973
- Legs: 2
- No. of shows: 14

The Rolling Stones concert chronology
- American Tour 1972; Australian Tour 1973; European Tour 1973

The Rolling Stones Australian Tour 1973 was a concert tour of countries bordering the Pacific Ocean in January and February 1973 by The Rolling Stones. The tour is sometimes called The Rolling Stones Pacific Tour 1973 and Winter Tour 1973, but concert posters and tickets of the shows (including the New Zealand show) state The Rolling Stones Australian Tour 1973.

== History ==
The tour was not associated with any album's release, but effectively was an extension of the Stones' infamous 1972 American S.T.P. Tour. The original intent was to play Australia and New Zealand, which had not seen the Stones since February and March 1966, as well as Japan, which had never seen the Stones at all. However, the Stones' 1972 American Tour had drawn worldwide press for its combustive mixture of group decadence and fan riots set amidst jet set hangers-on. This caused the Stones some serious drama for their Pacific visits in that visas and work permits might be hard to get. Accordingly, the Stones scheduled some shows in Hawaii first, as a fallback in case they could not get into certain countries. Hawaiian fans camped out on Christmas night 1972 in order to buy tickets.

Stones fears were confirmed when on 4 January 1973 Australia's Immigration Ministry let it be known that one of the Stones, unnamed, was banned from entering the country. On 8 January the Japanese Foreign Ministry said Mick Jagger would not be allowed into their country due to his prior drugs convictions.

On 9 January the Australians relented and said the Stones could enter. But first, the Stones announced an 18 January benefit concert at the Los Angeles Forum for victims of the recent 23 December 1972 earthquake in Nicaragua (Bianca Jagger's home country). This event was opened by Santana and Cheech & Chong, and served as the warm-up concert for the Pacific Tour. It raised more than £200,000 in relief funds.

Next the Stones started the tour proper with the three shows over 21 January and 22 January in Hawaii, at the Honolulu International Center with ZZ Top as the opening act. These were Mick Taylor's last shows as a Rolling Stone in the United States until a guest appearance at Kansas City in 1981. Next up on the schedule were a number of shows at the Budokan in Tokyo, running from 28 January to 1 February, for which 55,000 tickets had already been sold. But on 27 January, Japanese officials made a final confirmation of their decision to not let the Stones land; the shows were scrapped and the concert promoter had to refund all the tickets.

Thus the first leg of the tour came to a close. Some sources state that a 5 February show in Hong Kong's Football Club Stadium was played, but this never took place.

In any event the tour started up again for its second leg on 11 February with a single show in New Zealand, at Auckland's Western Springs Stadium. 14 February saw the first show in Australia, with Brisbane, Melbourne, Adelaide, Perth and Sydney being visited in turn, the last show being 27 February at Sydney's Royal Randwick Racecourse. The Brisbane show, which was held at the Milton Park Tennis Courts, was postponed twice due to poor weather. The Perth show held on 24 February coincided with pianist Nicky Hopkins 29th birthday, with the band singing an impromptu "Happy Birthday Nicky" on stage during the band introductions which was captured on audio recordings.

Australian fears may have been a little validated when the 21 February show at Adelaide's Memorial Drive Park found 5,000 Stones fans clashing with the local police, and 21 arrests were made. However, three days later high-profile Labor Party Immigration Minister Al Grassby said: "The Stones are an excellent example to Australian youth. I told them I was putting my faith in them and hoped they would do the right thing. I have no regrets that I let them in – yes, I went out on a limb to give them visas – to give a man a bad name and hang him is immoral and un-Australian."

== The shows ==
The Los Angeles benefit show introduced a catwalk to the Stones' stage set for the first time, behind Charlie Watts' drum position. In general the set-up and playing was more professional on this tour than on the overcharged 1972 North American Tour. The raw distorted sound evidenced on unofficial record releases from this tour has much in common with the European tour later the same year, though Nicky Hopkins still performed with the band on this round, which eventually became his last tour with the Rolling Stones. Unlike 1972, the Pacific leg also created less media hype and attracted few celebrities.

== Recordings ==
No official live album has been released from the tour, although audience recorded and soundboard bootleg recordings of all shows exist.

== Personnel ==
=== The Rolling Stones ===
Tour booklet cover for Hawaii shows.

- Mick Jagger – lead vocals, harmonica
- Keith Richards – guitar, backing vocals
- Mick Taylor – guitar
- Bill Wyman – bass guitar
- Charlie Watts – drums

=== Additional musicians ===
- Nicky Hopkins – piano
- Ian Stewart – piano
- Bobby Keys – saxophones
- Jim Price – trumpet, trombone

== Tour support acts ==
Poster for the sole New Zealand concert, designed by Ian McCausland.

The Hawaiian shows were opened by ZZ Top. Other supporting acts for the Stones on this tour were Pulse in Adelaide, Madder Lake in Melbourne, Headband, Itambu, and Chain in Sydney.

== Tour dates ==
Date	City	Country	Venue	Opening act(s)
North America
18 January 1973	Inglewood	United States	The Forum	Santana; Cheech & Chong
21 January 1973	Honolulu	United States	Honolulu International Center	ZZ Top
22 January 1973 (2 shows)	Honolulu	United States	Honolulu International Center	ZZ Top
Asia (Japanese Foreign Ministry said Jagger would not be allowed into their country due to his prior drugs convictions.)
~~28 January 1973~~	~~Tokyo~~	~~Japan~~	~~Nippon Budokan~~	—N/a
~~29 January 1973~~	~~Tokyo~~	~~Japan~~	~~Nippon Budokan~~	—N/a
~~30 January 1973~~	~~Tokyo~~	~~Japan~~	~~Nippon Budokan~~	—N/a
~~31 January 1973~~	~~Tokyo~~	~~Japan~~	~~Nippon Budokan~~	—N/a
~~1 February 1973~~	~~Tokyo~~	~~Japan~~	~~Nippon Budokan~~	—N/a
Oceania
11 February 1973	Auckland	New Zealand	Western Springs Stadium	Itambu
14 February 1973	Brisbane	Australia	Milton Tennis Courts	unknown
17 February 1973 (2 shows)	Melbourne	Australia	Kooyong Tennis Courts	Madder Lake
18 February 1973	Melbourne	Australia	Kooyong Tennis Courts	Madder Lake
20 February 1973	Adelaide	Australia	Memorial Drive Park	Pulse
21 February 1973	Adelaide	Australia	Memorial Drive Park	Pulse
24 February 1973	Perth	Australia	Western Australia Cricket Ground	unknown
26 February 1973	Sydney	Australia	Royal Randwick Racecourse	Headband, Itambu, Chain
27 February 1973	Sydney	Australia	Royal Randwick Racecourse	Headband, Itambu, Chain
