= Doo Doo Doo Doo Doo (Heartbreaker) =

1973 single by the Rolling Stones

Single by the Rolling Stones

from the album Goats Head Soup
- B-side: "Dancing with Mr. D."
- Released: December 1973
- Recorded: November–December 1972, May–June 1973
- Genre: Rock; funk rock; hard rock
- Length: 3:27
- Label: Rolling Stones
- Songwriter: Jagger–Richards
- Producer: Jimmy Miller

The Rolling Stones singles chronology
"Angie" (1973)	"Doo Doo Doo Doo Doo (Heartbreaker)" (1973)	"It's Only Rock 'n Roll (But I Like It)" (1974)

Goats Head Soup track listing
- 10 tracks Side one: 1. "Dancing with Mr. D"; 2. "100 Years Ago"; 3. "Coming Down Again"; 4. "Doo Doo Doo Doo Doo (Heartbreaker)"; 5. "Angie"; Side two: 6. "Silver Train"; 7. "Hide Your Love"; 8. "Winter"; 9. "Can You Hear the Music?"; 10. "Star Star"

"Doo Doo Doo Doo Doo (Heartbreaker)" is the fourth track on the Rolling Stones' 1973 album Goats Head Soup.

== Background ==
Written by Mick Jagger and Keith Richards, the song's lyrics relate two stories: one is a story of New York City police shooting a boy "right through the heart" because they mistook him for someone else, and the second of a ten-year-old girl who dies in an alley of a drug overdose. The latter event is not known to be factual.

In April 1973 a ten-year-old boy named Clifford Glover was with his father when plainclothes police stopped them at gunpoint in Queens, in New York City, supposedly having mistaken the two for suspects in an armed robbery (the robbers were described as being about one foot taller than the boy). The boy and his father ran, fearing that they were about to be victims of a robbery. The police chased them and one officer shot the 10-year-old boy in the back, killing him. The bullet entered Glover's lower back and emerged at the top of his chest (i.e., went through his heart). The case resulted in riots and a murder indictment against the officer, who was later acquitted in a jury trial.

After telling the story of the police shooting the wrong person, Jagger sings,

You heartbreaker, with your .44, I want to tear your world apart.

The .44 magnum cartridge had recently been made famous by the 1971 film Dirty Harry, in which Harry Callahan uses "the most powerful handgun in the world" to cleanse the streets of crime. The lyrics complement the music, which Rolling Stone magazine described as "urban R&B" for its funk influence and prominent clavinet part (played by Billy Preston).

== Recording ==
"Doo Doo Doo Doo Doo (Heartbreaker)" was first recorded in November and December 1972 before being re-recorded early the following summer. Jim Horn arranged the song's horns and played sax together with Bobby Keys, and Jim Price played trumpet. Mick Taylor played the lead guitar part (which features a wah-wah pedal and a Leslie speaker), Richards played rhythm guitar and bass; Billy Preston played clavinet (also using a wah-wah during the choruses), and RMI Electra Piano.

The song appeared on the American version of the compilation album Rewind (1971-1984).

== Reception ==
Released as the second single from Goats Head Soup in the US only (after the No. 1 hit "Angie"), the song reached No. 15 in the US on the Billboard Hot 100 and has remained a staple on AOR and classic rock radio stations.

Cash Box called it a "powerhouse rocker to once again rocket the Stones to the Top of the Pops" that is "filled with that hard Jagger vocal sensuality and a very tasty bass line". Record World called it a "movin' rocker that should follow in 'Angie's' footsteps as a gold single".

== Personnel ==
The Rolling Stones

- Mick Jagger – lead and backing vocals
- Keith Richards – backing vocals, electric guitar, bass guitar
- Mick Taylor – backing vocals, electric guitar
- Charlie Watts – drums

Additional personnel

- Billy Preston – clavinet, RMI Electra Piano
- Bobby Keys – tenor saxophone
- Jim Horn – alto saxophone
- Chuck Findley – trumpet
- Jim Price – horn arrangement

== Charts ==
Chart (1974)	Peak position
Sweden (Tio i Topp)	16
US Billboard Hot 100	15
