= Nicky Hopkins =

English pianist and organist (1944–1994)

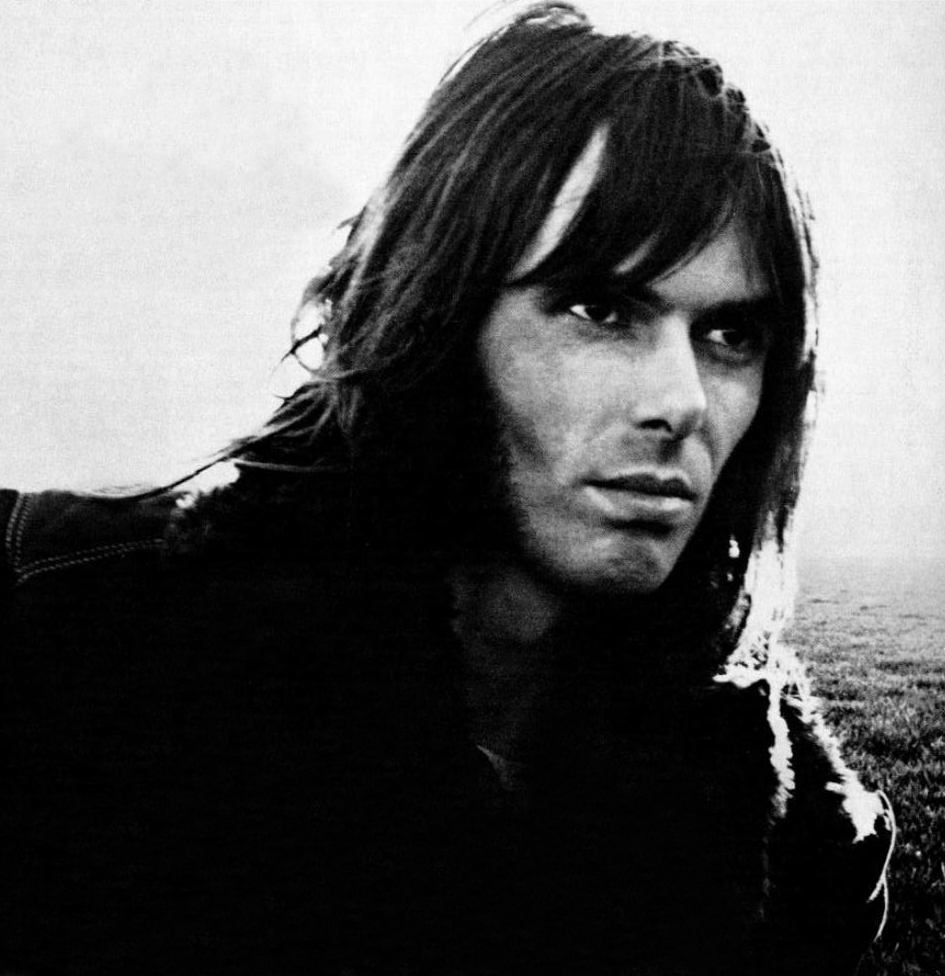
- Hopkins in 1973

Background information
- Born: Nicholas Christian Hopkins; 24 February 1944; Perivale, Middlesex, England, UK
- Died: 6 September 1994 (aged 50) Nashville, Tennessee, U.S.
- Genres: Rock and roll; boogie woogie; blues
- Occupation: Musician
- Instruments: Piano; organ
- Years active: 1960–1994
- Labels: CBS; Fontana
- Formerly of: Screaming Lord Sutch and the Savages; Cliff Bennett and the Rebel Rousers; Cyril Davies All Stars; Jerry Garcia Band; the Kinks; the Rolling Stones; The Jeff Beck Group; Steve Miller Band; Quicksilver Messenger Service; Night

Nicholas Christian Hopkins (24 February 1944 – 6 September 1994) was an English pianist and organist. He performed on many British and American rock music recordings from the 1960s to the 1990s, including on songs recorded by the Beatles, the Rolling Stones, the Who, the Kinks, the Steve Miller Band, Jefferson Airplane, Rod Stewart, George Harrison, John Lennon, Paul McCartney, Ringo Starr, the Hollies, Cat Stevens, Carly Simon, Harry Nilsson, Joe Walsh, Peter Frampton, Jerry Garcia, Jeff Beck, Joe Cocker, Art Garfunkel, Badfinger, Quicksilver Messenger Service and Donovan. He is widely considered to be one of the greatest studio pianists in the history of popular rock music.

In 2025, Hopkins was inducted into the Rock and Roll Hall of Fame in the Musical Excellence Award category and he was inducted into the Musicians Hall of Fame and Museum in 2026.

== Early life ==
Nicholas Christian Hopkins was born in Perivale, Middlesex, England, on 24 February 1944. He began playing the piano at the age of three. He attended Sudbury Primary School in Perrin Road and Wembley County Grammar School, which now forms part of Alperton Community School, and was initially tutored by a local piano teacher; in his teens he won a scholarship to the Royal Academy of Music in London. He suffered from Crohn's disease for most of his life.

His poor health and repeated surgery later made it difficult for him to tour, and he worked mainly as a session musician for most of his career. Hopkins's studies were interrupted in 1960 when he left school at 16 to become the pianist with Screaming Lord Sutch's Savages until, two years later, he and fellow Savages Bernie Watson, Rick Brown (aka Ricky Fenson) and Carlo Little joined the renowned blues harmonica player Cyril Davies, who had just left Blues Incorporated, and became the Cyril Davies (R&B) All-Stars. Hopkins played piano on their first single, Davies's much-admired theme tune "Country Line Special".

Hopkins was forced to leave the All Stars in May 1963 for a series of operations that almost cost him his life and he was bed-ridden for 19 months in his late teenage years. During his convalescence, Davies died of leukemia and the All Stars disbanded. Hopkins's frail health led him to concentrate on working as a session musician instead of joining bands, although he left his mark performing with a wide variety of famous bands. He quickly became one of London's most in-demand session pianists and performed on many hit recordings from this period.

== The Rolling Stones ==
Hopkins' first sessions with a member of the Rolling Stones was on the A Degree of Murder soundtrack with Brian Jones in February 1967. Hopkins' first sessions with the Rolling Stones as a band were from 17 to 22 May 1967, where he contributed prominent piano parts on "We Love You" and "She's a Rainbow". Hopkins went on to play sessions with the Rolling Stones up to December 1974, and appears on their studio albums from Their Satanic Majesties Request in 1967 through until Tattoo You in 1981, except for Some Girls(1978).

Hopkins added significant piano parts to "Sympathy for the Devil", "No Expectations", and "Salt of the Earth" (1968), "Gimme Shelter" and "Monkey Man" (1969), "Sway" (1971), "Loving Cup" and "Ventilator Blues" (1972), "Coming Down Again", "Angie", and "Winter" (1973), "Time Waits for No One" (1974), "Fool to Cry" (1976), and "Waiting on a Friend" (recorded 1972, released in 1981). When working with the band during their critical and commercial zenith in the late 1960s and early 1970s, Hopkins tended to be employed on a wide range of songs, including ballads, up-tempo rockers and acoustic material; conversely, longtime de facto Stones keyboardist Ian Stewart mainly played on traditional blues rock numbers of his choice, while Billy Preston often featured on soul- and funk-influenced tunes. Hopkins's work with the Rolling Stones is prominent on their 1972 studio album, Exile on Main St., where he contributed a variety of musical styles, often playing the main melodic part. Hopkins plays on 14 of the album's 18 tracks, giving him a greater presence than full time Rolling Stone Bill Wyman, who only contributed to nine of the songs.

Along with Ry Cooder, Mick Jagger, Bill Wyman and Charlie Watts, Hopkins released the 1972 album Jamming with Edward! It was recorded in 1969, during the Stones' Let It Bleed sessions, when guitarist Keith Richards was not present in the studio. The eponymous "Edward" was an alias of Nicky Hopkins derived from studio banter with Brian Jones. It was also incorporated into the title of Hopkins's instrumental song "Edward, the Mad Shirt Grinder", recorded with Quicksilver Messenger Service and released on Shady Grove in December 1969. Hopkins also contributed to the Jamming With Edward! cover art.

Hopkins was added to the Rolling Stones touring line-up for the 1971 Good-Bye Britain Tour, as well as the 1972 North American tour and the 1973 Pacific tour.

Hopkins contemplated forming his own band with multi-instrumentalist Pete Sears and drummer Prairie Prince around this time but decided against it after the Stones tour. Hopkins failed to make the Rolling Stones' 1973 European tour, possibly due to ill health. For the 1989 Steel Wheels tour Hopkins was considered but the band settled for Chuck Leavell and Matt Clifford instead; according to Hopkins this was due to insecurities regarding his frail health. After this, aside from a guest appearance in 1978, Hopkins did not play live on stage with the Stones again.

== The Kinks ==
Hopkins was invited in 1965 by producer Shel Talmy to record with the Kinks. He played on four of the group's studio albums: The Kink Kontroversy (1965), Face to Face (1966), Something Else by The Kinks (1967) and The Kinks Are the Village Green Preservation Society (1968).

The relationship between Hopkins and the Kinks deteriorated after the release of The Kinks Are the Village Green Preservation Society. Hopkins maintained that "about seventy percent" of the keyboard work on the album was his, and was incensed when Ray Davies apparently credited himself with most of the keyboard playing. He was also angered that he was not paid for his session work with the group.

Despite Hopkins's grudge against him, Davies spoke positively of his contributions in a New York Times interview in 1995, shortly after Hopkins' death. Davies said that Hopkins would "only play when necessary" but still made important differences in the track once it was finally mixed. He also respected Hopkins because of his earlier work, such as playing on "Country Line Special".

== The Who ==
Hopkins was first invited to join the Who by Shel Talmy in 1965, while recording their debut album My Generation. Hopkins received a rare songwriting co-credit for the instrumental "The Ox". Due to the band breaking ties with Talmy, Hopkins didn't record again with the band until the single "Dogs" in 1968. He next contributed to the Who's Next album in 1971, contributing to "The Song Is Over" and "Getting in Tune". In addition, during those sessions he played on the single "Let's See Action" as well as "Too Much of Anything".

Hopkins did not play on the Quadrophenia album, and returned in 1975 on The Who by Numbers. He was also a key instrumentalist on the soundtrack for Ken Russell's 1975 film Tommy; Townshend had wanted Hopkins to play on the original 1969 album. Hopkins played piano on several tracks and is acknowledged in the album's liner notes for his work on arrangements for most of the songs.

== Solo albums and soundtrack work ==
In 1966, Hopkins released The Revolutionary Piano of Nicky Hopkins, produced by Shel Talmy. His next solo project released was The Tin Man Was a Dreamer in 1973, under the aegis of producer David Briggs. Other musicians appearing on the album include George Harrison (credited as "George O'Hara"), Mick Taylor of the Rolling Stones, and Prairie Prince. The album features a rare case of Hopkins singing lead vocals.

His next solo album, entitled No More Changes, was released in 1975. Appearing on the album are Hopkins (lead vocals and all keyboards), David Tedstone (guitars), Michael Kennedy (guitars), Rick Wills (bass), and Eric Dillon (drums and percussion), with back-up vocals from Kathi McDonald, Lea Santo-Robertie, Doug Duffey and Dolly. A third album, Long Journey Home, has remained unreleased. He also released three soundtrack albums in Japan between 1992 and 1993, The Fugitive, Patio and Namiki Family.

Hopkins also played on Space Jazz, the official soundtrack to Scientology founder L. Ron Hubbard’s novel, Battlefield Earth in 1982.

== Other groups ==
By the late 1960s, Hopkins was one of Britain's best-known session players, particularly through his work with the Rolling Stones and the Kinks. After he accompanied three of the Beatles on Jackie Lomax's "Sour Milk Sea", he was invited to play an electric piano solo on the group's "Revolution", which he did in one take. Further raising his profile, he contributed to the Harry Nilsson album Son of Schmilsson, and recordings by Donovan.

Hopkins became discontented from just being a session musician, and wanted to tour with a band. In 1968, he joined the Jeff Beck Group. Intended as a vehicle for former Yardbirds guitarist Jeff Beck, the band also included vocalist Rod Stewart, bassist Ronnie Wood and drummer Micky Waller. He remained with the ensemble through its dissolution in August 1969, performing on Truth (1968) and Beck-Ola (1969). He composed the instrumental "Girl from Mill Valley" on the latter album. He was reportedly to play in Led Zeppelin when the group formed, but declined the offer. Hopkins also began to record for several San Franciscan groups, including the New Riders of the Purple Sage, the Steve Miller Band and Jefferson Airplane, with whom he recorded the album Volunteers and also performed at the Woodstock festival. From 1969 to 1970, Hopkins was a full member of Quicksilver Messenger Service, appearing on Shady Grove (1969), Just for Love (1970) and What About Me (1970). In 1975, he contributed to the Solid Silver reunion album as a session musician.

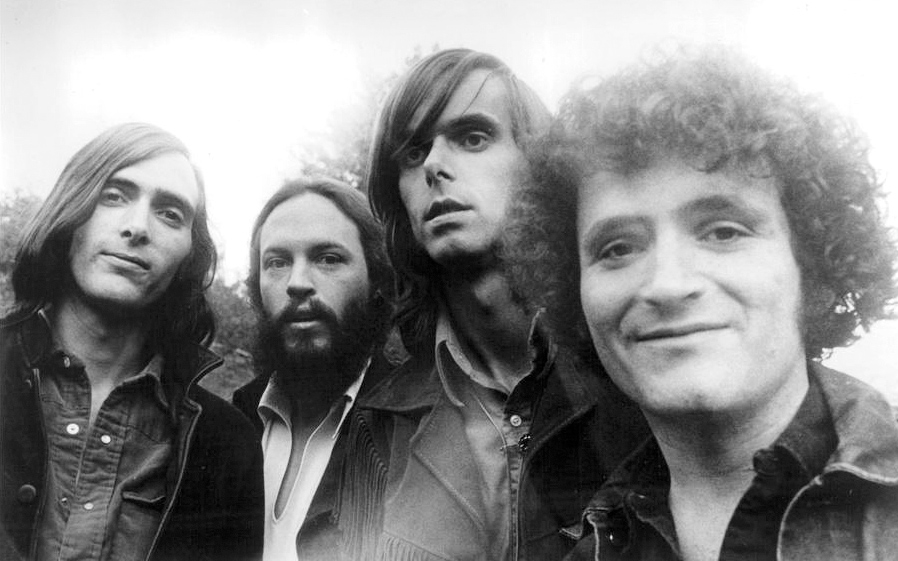
Quicksilver Messenger Service in January 1970, with Hopkins second from right

In 1969, Hopkins was a member of the short-lived Sweet Thursday, a quintet comprising Hopkins, Alun Davies (who worked with Cat Stevens), Jon Mark, Harvey Burns and Brian Odgers. The band completed their eponymous debut album; however, their American record label, Tetragrammaton Records, abruptly declared bankruptcy (supposedly the same day the album was released) with promotion and a possible tour never happening.

In August 1975, he joined the Jerry Garcia Band, envisaged as a major creative vehicle for the guitarist during the mid-seventies hiatus of the Grateful Dead. His increasing use of alcohol precipitated several erratic live performances, resulting in him leaving the group by mutual agreement after a 31 December appearance. During 1979–1989, he was playing and touring with Los Angeles-based Night, who had a hit with a cover of Walter Egan's "Hot Summer Nights".

In addition to recording with the Beatles in 1968, Hopkins worked with each of the four when they went solo. He played on several tracks for John Lennon's Imagine, (1971) including "Jealous Guy", which drew praise from the other musicians. Yoko Ono later said Hopkins' performance was "so melodic and beautiful that it still makes everyone cry, even now." He also played with George Harrison and Ringo Starr, making key contributions to their respective solo albums, Living in the Material World and Ringo. He worked with Paul McCartney on the song "Bip Bop" from the Wings debut album Wild Life and on McCartney's 1989 album Flowers in the Dirt.

Hopkins also performed with Graham Parker's backing band the Rumour after their keyboardist Bob Andrews left the band.

== Later life ==
Hopkins lived in Mill Valley, California, for several years. During this time he worked with several local bands and continued to record in San Francisco. One of his complaints throughout his career was that he did not receive royalties from any of his recording sessions, because of his status at the time as merely a "hired hand", as opposed to pop stars with agents.

His precarious health, a consequence of Crohn's disease and its complications, made touring very difficult, limiting him largely to studio work. Only Quicksilver Messenger Service, through its manager Ron Polte, who went to great lengths to treat his musicians fairly, as well as with assent of the band's members, included Hopkins in an ownership stake. Towards the end of his life Hopkins worked as a composer and orchestrator of film scores, with considerable success in Japan.

In the early 1980s, Hopkins credited the Church of Scientology-affiliated Narconon rehabilitation program with curing his drug and alcohol addiction so he ultimately remained a Scientologist for the rest of his life. As a result of his religious affiliation, he contributed to several of L. Ron Hubbard's musical recordings.

In 1993, Hopkins, Joe Walsh, Terry Reid, Rick Rosas, and Phil Jones put together an informal group called The Flew. They played one show at The Coach House in San Juan Capistrano. This was Hopkins's last public performance before his death.

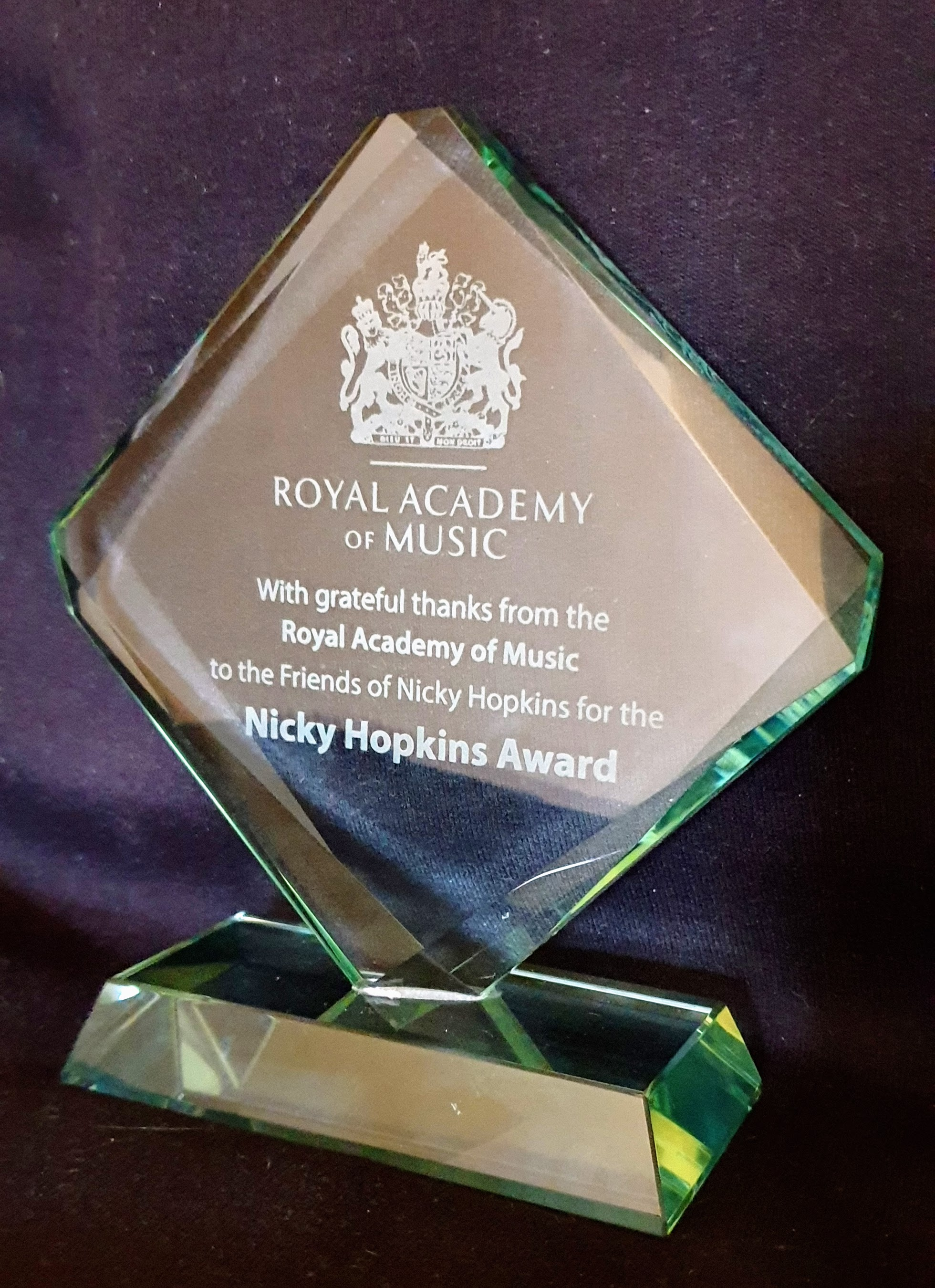
Presented to the Friends of Nicky Hopkins on 24 February 2019 by the Royal Academy of Music

== Death ==
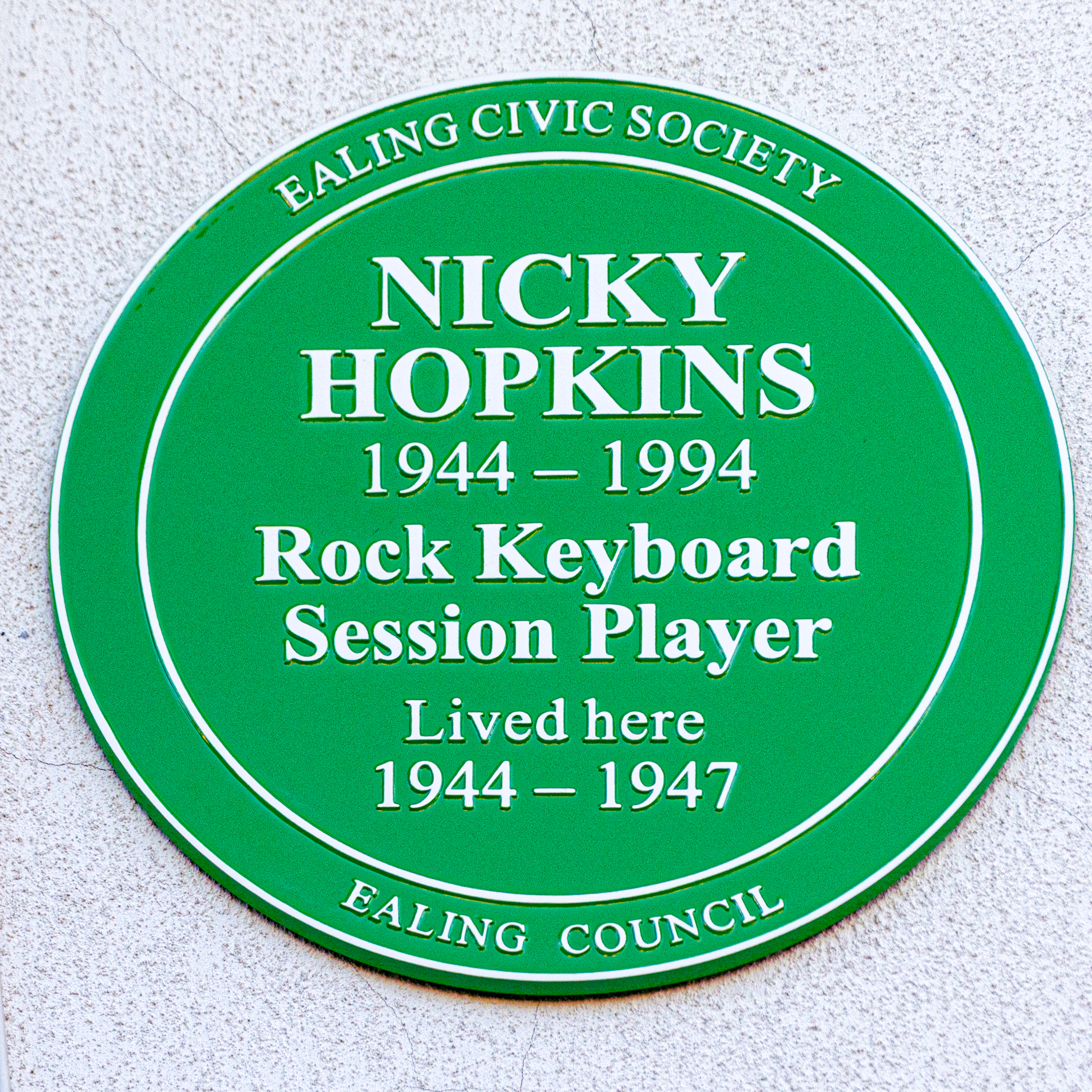
Commemorative plaque at 38 Jordan Road, Perivale

Hopkins died on 6 September 1994, at the age of 50, in Nashville, Tennessee, from complications resulting from intestinal surgery related to his lifelong battle with Crohn's disease. At the time of his death, he was working on his autobiography with Ray Coleman.

== Legacy and recognition ==
Songwriter and musician Julian Dawson collaborated with Hopkins on one recording, the pianist's last, in spring 1994, a few months before his death. After Ray Coleman's death, the connection led to Dawson working on a definitive biography of Hopkins, first published by Random House in German in 2010, followed in 2011 by the English-language version with the title And on Piano ... Nicky Hopkins (a hardback in the UK via Desert Hearts, and a paperback in North America via Backstage Books/Plus One Press).

On 8 September 2018, the Nicky Hopkins "piano" park bench memorial, crowdfunded through PledgeMusic, was unveiled in Perivale Park near Hopkins' birthplace.

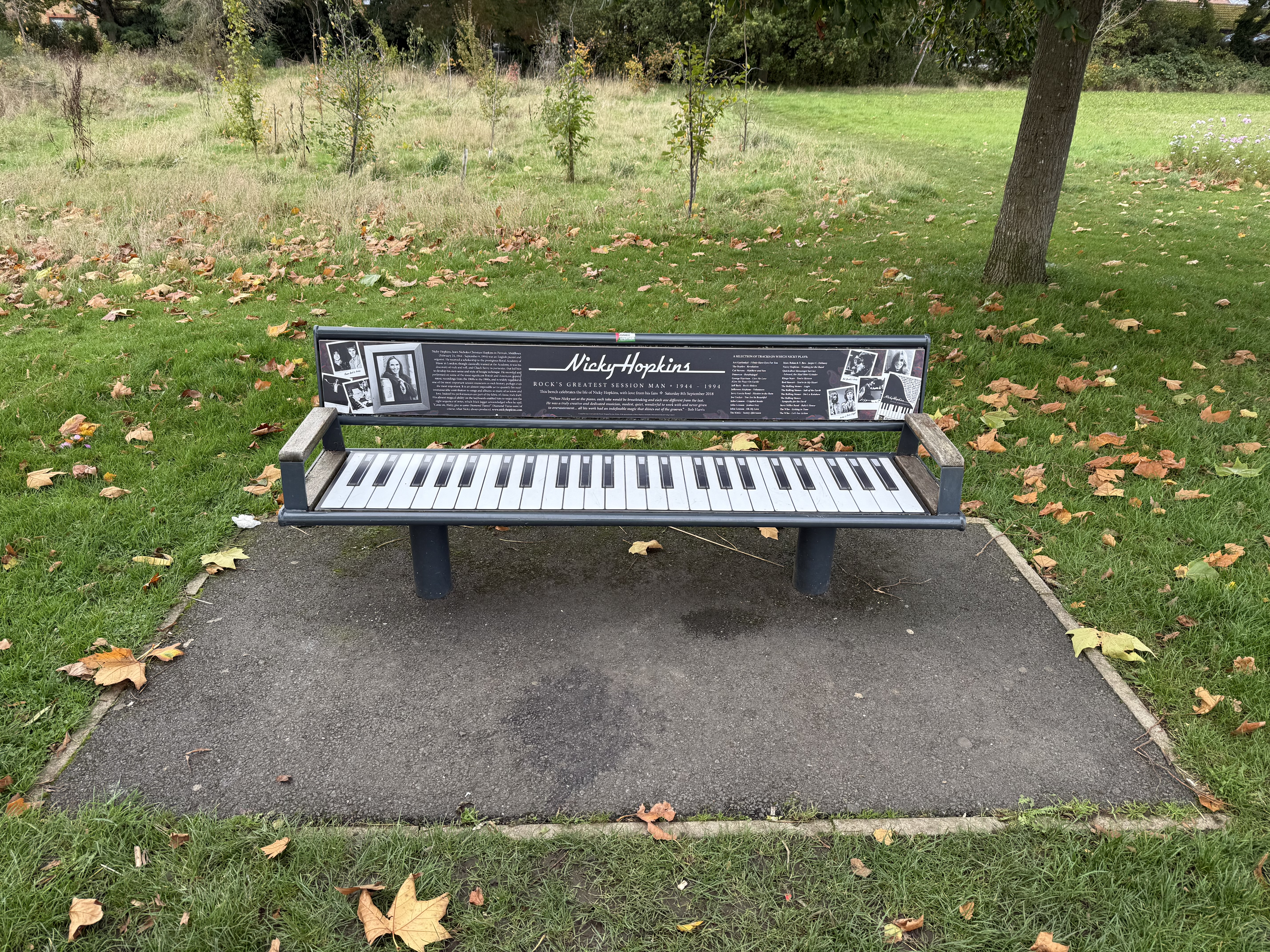
The memorial bench for Nicky Hopkins in Perivale.

The campaign offered the opportunity for pledgers to have their name inscribed on the bench and contribute towards funding a music scholarship at London's Royal Academy of Music, where Hopkins himself won a scholarship in the 1950s. Names that pledged in the campaign include Mick Jagger, Keith Richards, Charlie Watts, Ronnie Wood, Bill Wyman, Yoko Ono Lennon, Roger Daltrey, Jimmy Page, Hossam Ramzy, Johnnie Walker and Kenney Jones. A quote about Hopkins by Bob Harris appears on the bench.

On what would have been Hopkins' 75th birthday (24 February 2019), the Nicky Hopkins Scholarship at the Royal Academy of Music was created, and on 19 October 2019, a commemorative plaque on his childhood home, 38 Jordan Road, Perivale, donated by the Ealing Council and Ealing Civic Society, was unveiled.

In January 2026, the Mayor of Ealing, Cllr Anthony Kelly, officially opened the Nicky Hopkins Piano Room at Pear Tree Park Bistro, which is located very close to Nicky's memorial bench in Perivale Park.

== The Session Man documentary ==
In 2021, it was announced that a documentary about Nicky's life, titled The Session Man, was in production. The film's world premiere opened Doc'n Roll Film Festival 2023 at The Barbican Centre on 26 October 2023 when it was nominated for a Doc'n Roll Jury Award – Best Music Doc of 2023. The film was also screened at the Berlin Independent Film Festival 2024 where it won a Best Low Budget Feature award.

Awards won
| Date | Film Festival | Award |
|---|---|---|
| October 2023 | Doc'n Roll Festival | Jury Award – Best Music Doc (nomination) |
| February 2024 | Berlin Independent Film Festival | Best Low Budget Feature |
| March 2024 | Los Angeles Indie Film Festival | Best Foreign Feature |
| June 2024 | Kingston International Film Festival | Best Documentary |

The Session Man was released in cinemas throughout Japan from 6 September 2024 and digitally released in the USA on demand on 5 November 2024, and on DVD on 18 March 2025. At the beginning of 2026 in the UK, the documentary was released in selected cinemas and that year, it was also released on digital from 4 May.

A special screening of The Session Man in Nicky's hometown of Ealing on 20 November 2025 at the Ealing Picturehouse, marking the documentary's UK cinema release, was attended by the then deputy Mayor of Ealing, Cllr. Faduma Mohamed, Ronnie Wood and Woody Woodmansey.

== Discography ==
=== Solo albums ===
- The Revolutionary Piano of Nicky Hopkins (1966)
- The Tin Man Was a Dreamer (1973)
- No More Changes (1975)

=== Soundtracks ===
- The Fugitive (1992)
- Patio (1992)
- Namiki Family (1993)

=== Selected performances and collaborations ===
with the Rolling Stones

- "We Love You" and "Dandelion" (1967)
- "Sing This All Together", "In Another Land", "2000 Man", "She's a Rainbow", "The Lantern", "2000 Light Years from Home" and "On with the Show" from Their Satanic Majesties Request (1967)
- "Child of the Moon" (1968)
- "Sympathy for the Devil", "No Expectations", "Dear Doctor", "Jigsaw Puzzle", "Street Fighting Man", "Stray Cat Blues" and "Salt of the Earth" from Beggars Banquet (1968)
- "Gimme Shelter", "Live with Me", "You Got the Silver" and "Monkey Man" from Let It Bleed (1969)
- "Sway" from Sticky Fingers (1971)
- Exile on Main St. (1972)
- "Dancing with Mr. D.", "Coming Down Again", "Angie", "Winter" and "Can You Hear the Music" from Goats Head Soup (1973)
- "Till the Next Goodbye", "Time Waits for No One", "Luxury", "If You Really Want to Be My Friend" and "Fingerprint File" from It's Only Rock 'n Roll (1974)
- "Cherry Oh Baby" and "Fool to Cry" from Black and Blue (1976)
- "Send It to Me" and "Indian Girl" from Emotional Rescue (1980)
- "Tops", "No Use in Crying" and "Waiting on a Friend" (recorded 1972) from Tattoo You (1981)

with the Who

- My Generation (1965)
- "The Song Is Over" and "Getting in Tune" on Who's Next (1971)
- "Let's See Action" (1971)
- The Who by Numbers (1975)

with Jeff Beck

- "Morning Dew" (1967)
- Truth (1967)
- "Girl From Mill Valley" on Beck-Ola (1969)

with Joe Cocker

- I Can Stand a Little Rain (1974)
- "You Are So Beautiful" (1974)
- Jamaica Say You Will (1975)

with Art Garfunkel

- Breakaway (1975)
- Lefty (1988)

with George Harrison

- Living in the Material World (1973)
- Dark Horse (1974)
- Extra Texture (Read All About It) (1975)

with Jefferson Airplane

- Volunteers (1969)
- "Wooden Ships" (1969)
- "Eskimo Blue Day" (1969)
- "Hey Fredrick" (1969)
- Woodstock Festival set.

with the Kinks

- The Kink Kontroversy (1965)
- Face to Face (1966)
- Something Else by the Kinks (1967)
- The Kinks Are the Village Green Preservation Society (1968)

with John Lennon

- Imagine (1971)
- "Happy Xmas (War Is Over)" (1971)
- Walls and Bridges (1974)

with Quicksilver Messenger Service

- Shady Grove (composer of "Edward, the Mad Shirt Grinder") (1969)
- Just for Love (1970)
- What About Me (composer of "Spindrifter") (1970)

with Ringo Starr

- Ringo (1973)
- Goodnight Vienna (1974)

with Rod Stewart

- Foot Loose & Fancy Free (1977)
- Blondes Have More Fun (1978)
- Every Beat of My Heart (1986)

with others

- Gene Clark – various recordings
- Amory Kane – various recordings
- Cat Stevens – "Matthew and Son" on Matthew and Son (1967)
- The Creation – We Are Paintermen (1967)
- The Easybeats – "Heaven & Hell" and an unreleased album titled Good Times (1967)
- The Beatles – "Revolution" (single version) (1968)
- The Move – "Hey Grandma", "Mist on a Monday Morning" on Move and "Wild Tiger Woman" (1968)
- Paul Jones – "And the Sun Will Shine"
- Brewer & Shipley – Weeds (1969)
- Steve Miller Band – "Kow Kow" on Brave New World (1969); "Baby's House" (which Hopkins co-wrote with Miller) on Your Saving Grace (1969)
- Jackie Lomax – Is This What You Want? (1969)
- P. J. Proby – "Reflections (Of Your Face)" on Three Week Hero (1969)
- The Iveys – "See-Saw Granpa" on Maybe Tomorrow (1969)
- Donovan – "Barabajagal" on Barabajagal (1969); Essence to Essence (1973)
- Jamming with Edward!, jam session with Ry Cooder, Mick Jagger, Bill Wyman and Charlie Watts (recorded 1969, released 1972)
- The Jayhawks – "Two Angels" and "Martin's Song" on Hollywood Town Hall (1992)
- Carly Simon – No Secrets (1972)
- New Riders of the Purple Sage – Powerglide (1972)
- Harry Nilsson – Son of Schmilsson (1972)
- Marc Bolan – "Jasper C. Debussy" (recorded 1966–67, released 1972)
- Martha Reeves – Martha Reeves (1974)
- Peter Frampton – Somethin's Happening (1974)
- Jerry Garcia Band – Let It Rock: The Jerry Garcia Collection, Vol. 2 (1975); Garcia Live Volume Five (1975)
- Jerry Garcia – Reflections (1976)
- Bill Wyman – Stone Alone (1976)
- Carole Bayer Sager – Carole Bayer Sager (1977)
- Jennifer Warnes – Jennifer Warnes (1977)
- Badfinger – Airwaves (1979)
- Meat Loaf – "More Than You Deserve" on Dead Ringer (1981)
- Ron Wood – 1234 (1981)
- Graham Parker – Another Grey Area (1982)
- Dusty Springfield – White Heat (1982)
- Buzzy Linhart – The Four Sides of Buzzy Linhart (1982, EP)
- Carl Wilson – Youngblood (1983)
- Belinda Carlisle – Belinda (1986)
- Paul McCartney – Flowers in the Dirt (1989)
- The Dogs D'Amour – Errol Flynn (1989)
- Adam Bomb – New York Times (recorded in 1990, released in 2001)
- Spinal Tap – "Rainy Day Sun" on Break Like the Wind (1991)
- Izzy Stradlin – Izzy Stradlin and the Ju Ju Hounds (1992)
- Matthew Sweet – Altered Beast (1993)
- Joe Walsh – "Guilty of the Crime" on A Future to This Life: Robocop – The Series Soundtrack (1994)
- Robin Millar - Cat's Eyes (recorded 1974, released 2019)
