= Kracker =

Former American rock band

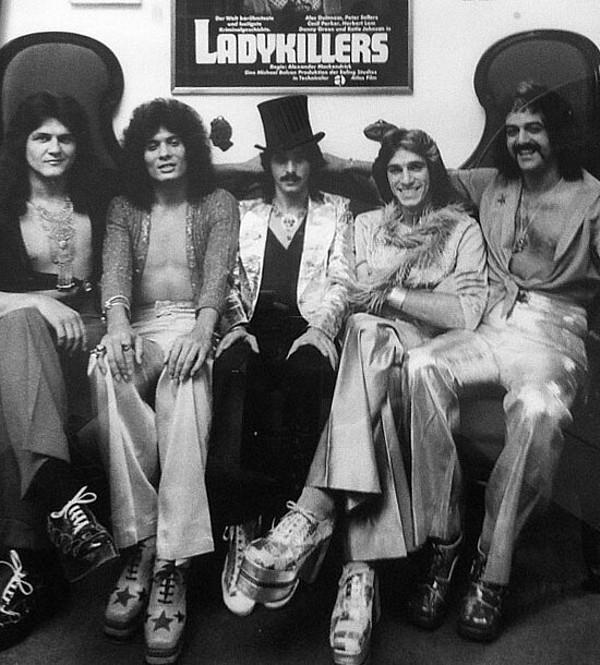
- The group Kracker in London, UK. 1973

Background information
- Origin: South Florida, United States
- Genre: Rock
- Years active: 1970–?
- Labels: ABC Dunhill, Rolling Stones, TK
- Members: Victor Angulo; Art Casado; Carl Driggs; Chuck Francour; Carlos Garcia

Kracker were an American rock band active in the 1970s.

== Biography ==
The band was originally formed in South Florida in 1970, but moved to Chicago in April 1971, where they were introduced to producer Jimmy Miller. With Miller, they recorded their first album, La Familia, which was released on ABC Dunhill in 1972. The single "Because of You (The Sun Don't Set)" reached number 104 on the Billboard Bubbling Under chart; it would be their only charted single. Their second album, Kracker Brand, was produced and released the next year on ABC Dunhill.

In early 1973, Mick Jagger and Keith Richards developed an interest in Kracker, resulting in a deal whereby the band's second album was licensed for distribution outside the United States by Rolling Stones Records, making Kracker the first band on that label. The association with the Rolling Stones continued when later that year Kracker moved to London and toured Europe as the opening act for the Rolling Stones. During their career, Kracker also toured with other notable acts, including Chuck Berry, Sly and the Family Stone, J Geils Band, Doctor John, Lou Reed, Styx, Cheap Trick, and REO Speedwagon.

In 1976, Kracker was signed by Henry Stone to Dash Records, in Miami, Florida, and the group recorded their third and final album, Hot, which was a compilation of dance-oriented rock.

== Members ==
- Victor Angulo – Guitar, vocals
- Art Casado – Drums, vocals
- Carl Driggs – Lead vocals, percussion (died in 2017)
- Chuck Francour – Lead vocals, keyboards (died in 2022)
- Carlos Garcia – Bass, vocals (died in 2019)

== Discography ==
- La Familia (1972, ABC Dunhill)
- Kracker Brand (1973, ABC Dunhill/Rolling Stones Records)
- Hot (1976, Dash Records)
