= Goats Head Soup =

Studio album by the Rolling Stones
- Released: 31 August 1973
- Recorded: 25 November 1972 – 5 February 1973
- Studios: Dynamic Sounds (Kingston, Jamaica); The Village (Los Angeles); Island (London)
- Genres: Rock; blues; funk
- Length: 46:56
- Label: Rolling Stones
- Producer: Jimmy Miller

The Rolling Stones chronology
Exile on Main St. (1972)	Goats Head Soup (1973)	It's Only Rock 'n Roll (1974)

Singles from Goats Head Soup
- 1. "Angie" / "Silver Train" Released: 20 August 1973; 2. "Doo Doo Doo Doo Doo (Heartbreaker)" / "Dancing with Mr. D" Released: December 1973

Goats Head Soup is the eleventh studio album by the English rock band the Rolling Stones, released on 31 August 1973 by Rolling Stones Records. Like its predecessor Exile on Main St., the band composed and recorded much of it outside of the United Kingdom due to their status as tax exiles—specifically, in Jamaica and the United States. The album contains ten tracks, including the lead single "Angie" which went to number one as a single in the US and the top five in the UK.

The album was the last to be produced by Jimmy Miller, who was an architect of the Rolling Stones sound during their most acclaimed period, which began with 1968's Beggars Banquet. The band's bass guitarist, Bill Wyman, appears on only three of the album's ten tracks, but the rest of the Rolling Stones—lead vocalist Mick Jagger, guitarists Keith Richards and Mick Taylor, and drummer Charlie Watts—play on every track, except "Winter", which does not feature Richards. Regular Rolling Stones collaborators, including saxophonist Bobby Keys, organist Billy Preston, and pianists Nicky Hopkins and Ian Stewart, also feature.

Goats Head Soup achieved number one chart positions in the UK, US and several other world markets. Nevertheless, it received mixed reviews from critics and audiences and is generally seen as the beginning of the band's decline after a string of critically acclaimed albums. In recent times, however, its reception has grown in stature. The band supported the album on a tour of Europe following its release. The album was remastered and released in 1994 and again in 2009 by Virgin Records and Universal Music respectively. It was remixed by Giles Martin for a 2020 reissue, including a deluxe edition with bonus tracks and unreleased outtakes. The reissue returned the album to number one in the UK charts.

== Recording ==
In November 1972 the band relocated to Dynamic Sounds studio in Kingston, Jamaica. Keith Richards said in 2002: "Jamaica was one of the few places that would let us all in! By that time about the only country that I was allowed to exist in was Switzerland, which was damn boring for me, at least for the first year, because I didn't like to ski ... Nine countries kicked me out, thank you very much, so it was a matter of how to keep this thing together ..."

Of the recording process, Marshall Chess, the president of Rolling Stones Records at the time, said in 2002, "We used to book studios for a month, 24 hours a day, so that the band could keep the same set-up and develop their songs in their free-form way, starting with a few lyrics and rhythms, jamming and rehearsing while we fixed the sound. It amazed me, as an old-time record guy, that the Stones might not have played together for six or eight months, but within an hour of jamming, the synergy that is their strength would come into play and they would lock it together as one ..."

Jagger said of their approach to recording at the time, "Songwriting and playing is a mood. Like the last album we did (Exile on Main St.) was basically recorded in short concentrated periods. Two weeks here, two weeks there – then another two weeks. And, similarly, all the writing was concentrated so that you get the feel of one particular period of time. Three months later it's all very different and we won't be writing the same kind of material as Goats Head Soup."

On the sessions and influence of the island, Richards said, "The album itself didn't take that long, but we recorded an awful lot of tracks. There were not only Jamaicans involved, but also percussion players who came from places like Guyana, a travelling pool of guys who worked in the studios. It was interesting to be playing in this totally different atmosphere. Mikey Chung, the engineer at Dynamic, for example, was a Chinese man – you realise how much Jamaica is a multi-ethnic environment." The album title is believed to be a reference to the Jamaican dish mannish water.

The first track recorded at Dynamic was "Winter", which Mick Taylor said started with "just Mick (Jagger) strumming on a guitar in the studio, and everything falling together from there". The main theme of the lyrics of the song go back to a 1968 outtake "Blood Red Wine". The song is also the only song on the album that does not feature Richards as a performer, with the electric rhythm guitar being played by Jagger. Mick Taylor would later record longer versions of "Winter" with Carla Olson for her The Ring of Truth album and "Silver Train" for their Too Hot for Snakes album.

The album's lead single, "Angie", was an unpopular choice as lead single with Atlantic Records which, according to Chess, "wanted another 'Brown Sugar' rather than a ballad". Although the song was rumoured to be about David Bowie's first wife Angela, both Jagger and Richards have consistently denied this. In 1993, Richards, in the liner notes to the compilation album Jump Back: The Best of The Rolling Stones, said that the title was inspired by his baby daughter, Dandelion Angela. However, in his 2010 memoir Life, Richards denied this, saying that he had chosen the name for the song before he knew the sex of his expected baby: "I just went, 'Angie, Angie.' It was not about any particular person; it was a name, like 'ohhh, Diana.' I didn't know Angela was going to be called Angela when I wrote 'Angie'. In those days you didn't know what sex the thing was going to be until it popped out. In fact, Anita named her Dandelion. She was only given the added name Angela because she was born in a Catholic hospital where they insisted that a 'proper' name be added." According to NME, the lyrics written by Jagger were inspired by Jagger's breakup with Marianne Faithfull.

This was the last Rolling Stones album produced by Jimmy Miller, who had worked with the band since 1968's Beggars Banquet. Miller had developed a debilitating drug habit during the course of his years spent with the Stones.

Bill Wyman plays bass on only three tracks on the album, with a majority of the bass duties being handled by Richards and Taylor instead. Aside from the official band members, other musicians appearing on Goats Head Soup include keyboard players Billy Preston, Nicky Hopkins and Ian Stewart.

Recording was completed in January 1973 in Los Angeles and May 1973 at London's Island Studios. The song "Silver Train" was a leftover from 1970s recordings at Olympic Sound, but was re-recorded in Los Angeles at Village Recorders. Goats Head Soup was also the band's first album without any cover songs since Their Satanic Majesties Request in 1967.

The sessions for Goats Head Soup were abundant with outtakes. Two of these – "Tops" and "Waiting on a Friend" – would surface on Tattoo You in 1981, and feature Mick Taylor on guitar; "Through the Lonely Nights" became the B-side to the "It's Only Rock 'n Roll (But I Like It)" single and was released on CD for the first time on the 2005 compilation Rarities 1971–2003. It is a soft rock ballad that features Richards on wah wah/Leslie speaker filtered guitar with Taylor playing a brief solo. In addition, "Short and Curlies" was started at the Goats Head Soup sessions and ended up appearing on the It's Only Rock n' Roll LP.

== Release ==
At the time of release, Jagger said, "I really feel close to this album, and I really put all I had into it ... I guess it comes across that I'm more into songs. It wasn't as vague as [Exile on Main St.] which kind of went on so long that I didn't like some of the things. There's more thought to this one. It was recorded all over the place over about two or three months. The tracks are much more varied than the last one. I didn't want it to be just a bunch of rock songs."

The lead single, "Angie", was released on 20 August 1973 by Rolling Stones Records, with "Silver Train" as the B-side. It reached number one in the United States and became a worldwide hit. Goats Head Soup was subsequently released on 31 August, with the catalogue number COC 59101, and also shot to the top of charts worldwide. The band attracted controversy with "Star Star", which was banned by the BBC in September due to its obscene lyrics. The song was originally titled "Starfucker" until Atlantic Records owner Ahmet Ertegün (Atlantic was the distributor of Rolling Stones Records) insisted on the change.

The Rolling Stones' autumn 1973 European Tour followed shortly after the album's release, in which four slots in the set list were given to the new material: "Doo Doo Doo Doo Doo (Heartbreaker)", "Star Star", "Dancing with Mr D" and "Angie". In addition, there were a few earlier performances of "Silver Train" and "100 Years Ago". "Doo Doo Doo Doo Doo (Heartbreaker)" was also played on the 1975 U.S. tour. "Star Star" was featured regularly on the 1975, 1976 and 1978 tours, and "Angie" was played in 1975 and occasionally in 1976.

=== Album art ===
The album cover was designed by Ray Lawrence and photographed by David Bailey, a friend of Jagger's who had worked with the Rolling Stones since 1964. The portrait of Jagger on the front cover was approximately life size in the original 12-inch LP format. Jagger was reluctant to be shot enveloped by a pink chiffon veil, which Bailey said was meant to look like "Katharine Hepburn in The African Queen". The album's gatefold has Taylor, Wyman and Watts wrapped in a similar fabric, and Richards on the back. The album's original rejected cover art featured the entire band as centaurs and an image of goat's head soup, a Jamaican dish made from a goat's body parts, such as the head, feet and testicles.

== Critical reception ==
=== Contemporary reviews ===
Critical reaction to the album was varied at the time. In Rolling Stone, Bud Scoppa called it "one of the year's richest musical experiences". On the other hand, Nick Kent of the NME found the record lacking in originality, stating, "on Goat's Head Soup the Stones have really nothing to say, but somehow say it so well that the results transcend the redundancy of the project in the first place". He called the album "truly great", giving praise to "Dancing with Mr. D" especially, and recommended that listeners "listen to it carefully". The Chicago Tribune's Lynn Van Matre agreed, finding the record uninnovative compared to prior works. Although she found it "more carefully put together" than Exile on Main St., she felt Goats Head Soup came across as a collection of songs rather than a cohesive project. Nevertheless, Van Matre praised the music, particularly "Heartbreaker". Charlie Gillett of Let It Rock magazine concluded that with Goats Head Soup, the Stones "finally ousted their rivals" as "The World's Greatest Rock Band", and deemed it "their first LP which is unquestionably the best rockin' groove of its time".

Billboard called Goats Head Soup "another fine album characterised as always by a series of fine, hard rockcuts from Mick Jagger and Keith Richard and superb guitar work from Mick Taylor". The reviewer particularly praised the ballads "Winter", "Coming Down Again" and "Angie". Writing for Zoo World, Arthur Levy considered the record on par with Sticky Fingers and Exile on Main St., adding that the three albums "are now the seeds of a new oeuvre".

By contrast, Lester Bangs derided the album in Creem, saying, "There is a sadness about the Stones now, because they amount to such an enormous 'So what?' The sadness comes when you measure not just one album, but the whole sense they're putting across now against what they once meant ..." The Philadelphia Inquirer's Jack Lloyd admitted that the LP would sell well, but overall found the album failed to live up to the band's previous works. Greg Shaw of Phonograph Record said the record had "no redeeming qualities whatsoever" and found "nothing good" about it. A year later, when reviewing It's Only Rock 'n Roll, Shaw considered Goats Head Soup to be the band's worst album up to that point, writing, "[it's the album] in which the rock & roll was insincere and the 'sensitive' material seemed forced and out of character."

=== Retrospective reviews ===
Professional ratings
Aggregate scores
Source	Rating
Metacritic	84/100 (deluxe)
Review scores
Source	Rating
AllMusic	3.5/5 stars
Christgau's Record Guide	B
MusicHound Rock	2/5 stars
NME	6/10
Pitchfork	8.0/10
Q	4/5 stars
Rolling Stone	4/5 stars

In his retrospective review for AllMusic, Stephen Thomas Erlewine writes: "Sliding out of perhaps the greatest winning streak in rock history, the Stones slipped into decadence and rock star excess with Goats Head Soup ... This is where the Stones' image began to eclipse their accomplishments, as Mick ascended to jet-setting celebrity and Keith slowly sunk deeper into addiction, and it's possible hearing them moving in both directions on Goats Head Soup, at times in the same song." Reviewing the 2009 reissue, Michael Hann of The Guardian gave the album a highly favourable review, stating that those who dismiss it in comparison to its predecessors are "missing a treat". Hann wrote that the album foreshadowed the band's sound of the late 1970s and 1980s, and that "Angie" and "Coming Down Again" are among the best songs in their entire catalogue. In 2015, Michael Gallucci of Ultimate Classic Rock felt that despite the inclusion of good tracks such as "Dancing with Mr. D", "Doo Doo Doo Doo Doo (Heartbreaker)" and "Star Star", the album represents the end of the Stones' "classic era".

Reviewing the 2020 reissue, Gallucci commented that although the Stones did not "bottom out" until 1976's Black and Blue, Goats Head Soup is where their decline began. Although he found that the new mix enhances the album, he stated: "It's still sludgy, it still drags at points and it still occasionally comes off as lazy coasting by a band that felt it didn't have to try anymore now that it was on top of the world." David Browne of Rolling Stone awards it 4 stars and writes that the original album failed to live up to its predecessor and "made it appear as if the Stones had gone overnight from the coolest, possibly greatest, rock and roll band to something less than that – just another big, commercial rock act". He felt that even throughout the new mixes, the band sounds "burnt out, regretful, melancholic, [and] even at times vulnerable". He concluded that with the reissue, Goats Head Soup "now feels historic". Jem Aswad of Variety similarly felt that the 1973 album ended their "near-peerless streak" that began with Beggars Banquet. Although Aswad deems Goats Head Soup a "good album", he felt the reissue's outtakes were "forgettable" and the unreleased live album was worth it alone. Conversely, Alan Light of Esquire called Goats Head Soup a bad album, saying that it ended "one of the greatest runs in rock & roll history". He cited the ballads as its highlights and commented: "It marked the moment the band stopped simply being the Rolling Stones and started playing the part of 'The Stones'." Michael Elliott of PopMatters agreed, writing that Goats Head Soup ended "the greatest four-album run in rock 'n' roll". He states that the album is where "their ascension" began to wane and "the idea of the Rolling Stones became just as important as the band itself". Elliott nevertheless praised songs such as "Angie" and "Doo Doo Doo Doo Doo (Heartbreaker)", as well as the unreleased tracks, writing that "Criss Cross" would "easily" have been a highlight of the original record.

Reflecting years later, David Cavanagh of Uncut noted that reactions to the album – and "Angie" as its lead single – from fans and critics were "characterised by disappointment", reasoning this was especially due to the momentum the band had built from Beggars Banquet (1968) to Exile on Main St. (1972). He also added that the qualms revolved around "the downbeat pensiveness of an album that sometimes seems lost in a fug of regret", as well as other apparent anti-climactic features, such as its "more mainstream, keyboard-heavy production", "low quota of rockers" and "[a] not so-obviously assertive Keith".

== Reissues ==
In 1994 Goats Head Soup was remastered and reissued by Virgin Records, and again in 2009 by Universal Music. The 1994 remaster was initially released in a Collector's Edition CD, which replicated in miniature many elements of the original gatefold album packaging. The first pressing of the 2009 remaster contains a censored version of "Star Star" that was on the original US vinyl release, but not on the 1994 Virgin CD; later pressings contain the uncensored version.

The album was reissued once more in 2011 by Universal Music Enterprises in a Japanese-only SHM-SACD version, which includes the uncensored version of "Star Star" with a previously unreleased fadeout.

On 4 September 2020, the album was reissued by Polydor Records, with a new mix by Giles Martin. Deluxe editions of the album featured never-before-released outtakes such as "Criss Cross", released as a music video on 9 July 2020, "Scarlet", featuring Jimmy Page, released as a music video on 8 August 2020, and "All the Rage". The album re-entered the UK albums chart at number one, 47 years after it first reached the top of the chart in September 1973.

== Track listing ==
=== 1973 original release ===
All tracks are written by Mick Jagger and Keith Richards.

Side one
No.	Title	Length
1.	"Dancing with Mr. D."	4:53
2.	"100 Years Ago"	3:59
3.	"Coming Down Again"	5:54
4.	"Doo Doo Doo Doo Doo (Heartbreaker)"	3:26
5.	"Angie"	4:33

Side two
No.	Title	Length
6.	"Silver Train"	4:27
7.	"Hide Your Love"	4:12
8.	"Winter"	5:30
9.	"Can You Hear the Music"	5:31
10.	"Star Star"	4:25
Total length:		46:56

=== 2020 Deluxe Edition ===
Disc two - Rarities & Alternative Mixes
No.	Title	Writer(s)	Length
1.	"Scarlet" (with Jimmy Page)		3:44
2.	"All the Rage"		4:32
3.	"Criss Cross"	Jagger/Richards/Mick Taylor	4:11
4.	"100 Years Ago" (Piano Demo)		2:43
5.	"Dancing with Mr D." (instrumental)		3:31
6.	"Heartbreaker" (instrumental)		3:18
7.	"Hide Your Love" (alternative mix)		5:18
8.	"Dancing with Mr D." (Glyn Johns 1973 mix)		4:34
9.	"Doo Doo Doo Doo Doo (Heartbreaker)" (Glyn Johns 1973 mix)		3:26
10.	"Silver Train" (Glyn Johns 1973 mix)		4:31
Total length:			39:58

Note: The Japanese deluxe box set includes additional Glyn Johns mixes for "100 Years Ago" and "Can You Hear The Music"

Disc three - Brussels Affair
No.	Title	Length
1.	"Brown Sugar" (Live at Forest National Arena, Brussels, 17/10/73, first show)	3:54
2.	"Gimme Shelter" (Live at Forest National Arena, Brussels, 17/10/73, second show)	5:31
3.	"Happy" (Live at Forest National Arena, Brussels, 17/10/73, second show)	3:13
4.	"Tumbling Dice" (Live at Forest National Arena, Brussels, 17/10/73, second show)	5:02
5.	"Star Star" (Live at Forest National Arena, Brussels, 17/10/73, second show)	4:15
6.	"Dancing with Mr. D." (Live at Forest National Arena, Brussels, 17/10/73, second show)	4:36
7.	"Doo Doo Doo Doo Doo (Heartbreaker)" (Live at Forest National Arena, Brussels, 17/10/73, second show)	5:01
8.	"Angie" (Live at Forest National Arena, Brussels, 17/10/73, second show)	5:13
9.	"You Can't Always Get What You Want" (Live at Forest National Arena, Brussels, 17/10/73, second show)	10:57
10.	"Midnight Rambler" (Live at Forest National Arena, Brussels, 17/10/73, first show)	12:49
11.	"Honky Tonk Women" (Live at Forest National Arena, Brussels, 17/10/73, second show)	3:10
12.	"All Down the Line" (Live at Forest National Arena, Brussels, 17/10/73, second show, guitar solo taken from the first show)	4:19
13.	"Rip This Joint" (Live at Forest National Arena, Brussels, 17/10/73, second show)	2:24
14.	"Jumpin' Jack Flash" (Live at Forest National Arena, Brussels, 17/10/73, second show)	3:26
15.	"Street Fighting Man" (Live at Forest National Arena, Brussels, 17/10/73, second show)	5:13
Total length:		79:33

== Personnel ==
- Track numbers noted in parentheses below are based on the CD track numbering.

The Rolling Stones

- Mick Jagger – lead vocals (all but 3), backing vocals (1, 3, 4, 6, 9, 10), electric rhythm guitar (6, 8), harmonica (6), piano (7)
- Keith Richards – electric guitar & backing vocals (1, 3, 4, 6, 9, 10), bass guitar (2, 4, 6, 7), acoustic guitar (5), lead vocals (3)
- Mick Taylor – electric guitar (1, 2, 4, 6–10), backing vocals (1, 4, 6), bass guitar (1, 3, 9), acoustic guitar (5)
- Bill Wyman – bass guitar (5, 8, 10)
- Charlie Watts – drums (all tracks)

Additional personnel

- Nicky Hopkins – piano (1, 3, 5, 8, 9)
- Billy Preston – clavinet (2, 4), piano (4)
- Ian Stewart – piano (6, 10)
- Bobby Keys – tenor saxophone (4), baritone saxophone (3, 7, 10)
- Jim Horn – alto saxophone (3, 4), flute (9)
- Chuck Findley – trumpet (4)
- Jim Price – horn arrangement (4)
- Nicky Harrison – string arrangement (5, 8)
- Anthony "Rebop" Kwaku Baah – percussion (1, 9)
- Pascal (Nicholas Pascal Raicevic) – percussion (1, 9)
- Jimmy Miller – percussion (9)

Technical

- Chief engineer and Mixer – Andy Johns
- Assistant engineers – Carlton Lee, Howard Kilgour and Doug Bennett.
- Photography and sleeve design by David Bailey

== Charts ==
=== Weekly charts ===
1973–1974 weekly chart performance
Chart (1973–1974)	Peak position
Australian Albums (Kent Music Report)	1
Austrian Albums (Ö3 Austria)	5
Canada Top Albums/CDs (RPM)	1
Dutch Albums (Album Top 100)	1
Finland (The Official Finnish Charts)	6
German Albums (Offizielle Top 100)	2
Italian Albums (Musica e Dischi)	8
Japanese Albums (Oricon)	7
Norwegian Albums (VG-lista)	1
Spanish Albums (PROMUSICAE)	1
Swedish Albums (Sverigetopplistan)	2
UK Albums (Official Charts)	1
US Billboard 200	1

2020 weekly chart performance
Chart (2020)	Peak position
Austrian Albums (Ö3 Austria)	1
Belgian Albums (Ultratop Flanders)	2
Belgian Albums (Ultratop Wallonia)	8
Czech Albums (ČNS IFPI)	55
Dutch Albums (Album Top 100)	6
Finnish Albums (Suomen virallinen lista)	16
German Albums (Offizielle Top 100)	2
Hungarian Albums (MAHASZ)	22
Irish Albums (Official Charts)	13
Norwegian Albums (VG-lista)	14
Polish Albums (ZPAV)	41
Portuguese Albums (AFP)	7
Scottish Albums (Official Charts)	1
Swiss Albums (Schweizer Hitparade)	3
UK Albums (Official Charts)	1
US Billboard 200	19

=== Year-end charts ===
1973 year-end chart performance
Chart (1973)	Position
Australian Albums (Kent Music Report)	17
Dutch Albums (MegaCharts)	12
French Albums (SNEP)	13

1974 year-end chart performance
Chart (1974)	Position
Australian Albums (Kent Music Report)	17
US Billboard Top LPs & Tape	84

== Certifications ==
Certifications for Goats Head Soup
Region	Certification	Certified units/sales
Canada (Music Canada)	Platinum	100,000^{^}
Denmark (IFPI Danmark)	Platinum	10,000
France (SNEP)	Gold	100,000^{*}
Germany (BVMI)	Gold	100,000
Netherlands (NVPI)	Gold	25,000
Sweden (GLF)	Gold	25,000
United Kingdom (BPI)	Gold	100,000^{^}
United States (RIAA)	3× Platinum	3,000,000^{^}
^{*} Sales figures based on certification alone.^{^} Shipments figures based on certification alone.
