= Star Star =

- German cover

Single by The Rolling Stones

from the album Goats Head Soup
- B-side: "Doo Doo Doo Doo Doo (Heartbreaker)"
- Released: December 1973
- Recorded: Dynamic Sounds Studio, Kingston, Jamaica (November 23-December 14, 1972); Village Recorders, Los Angeles (January 27–30, 1973; Island Studios, London (May 28-June 8, 1973); Olympic Sound Studios, London (May 7–17, July 6–9, 1973
- Genre: Hard rock
- Length: 4:24
- Label: Rolling Stones; Virgin
- Songwriter: Jagger–Richards
- Producer: Jimmy Miller

"Star Star" (originally titled "Starfucker") is a song recorded by the English rock band the Rolling Stones. It was written by Mick Jagger and Keith Richards. In a few select countries, the song was released as a single from the band's eleventh studio album Goats Head Soup (1973), with "Doo Doo Doo Doo Doo (Heartbreaker)" as its B-side. The song's title was changed to "Star Star" from "Starfucker" after Ahmet Ertegün of Atlantic Records insisted on the change.

== Background ==
The song gained notoriety not only for explicit lyrics alluding to sex acts involving fruit (among other things) but also for controversial mentions of such celebrities as John Wayne and Steve McQueen. It was released about nine months after Carly Simon's affair with Jagger and the release of the song "You're So Vain", on which Jagger provided background vocals. Simon, who was by now married to fellow singer-songwriter James Taylor, had moved to Hollywood, which is mentioned in the lyrics of "Star Star". The lyric "Yeah, you and me we made a pretty pair" also echoes the verse "well you said that we made such a pretty pair" in "You're So Vain". While discussing the song, the band members have always referred to the song by its original title. A live performance was captured and released on 1977's Love You Live. Atlantic tinkered with the mix in order to suppress the key expletives, but the very first promo copies were pressed unaltered.

=== Live version ===
In the 2003 live performance at Twickenham Stadium, Jagger changed the lyrics from "Ali MacGraw got mad with you for giving head to Steve McQueen" to "Billy Bob Thornton got mad with me for giving head to Angeline".

== Lyrics and music ==
"Star Star" was written by Mick Jagger and Keith Richards. The song was recorded by Andy Johns, Rob Fraboni, and Baker Bigsby at Dynamic Sounds studio in Kingston, Jamaica, Village Recorders in Los Angeles, and both Island Studios and Olympic Studios in London. It was produced by Jimmy Miller.

The opening lick, stabs in the verses and solo are played by Keith Richards and the rhythm guitar by Mick Taylor. Bill Wyman's bass line enters in at the second verse.

Musically, "Star Star" is a song with Chuck Berry influences, and opens with the same riff as the song "Johnny B. Goode".

== Critical reception ==
The BBC boycotted "Star Star", though not before it was played during a late-night news item about the 1973 Wembley concerts, part of the Goats Heads Soup tour. Writing for the Calgary Herald in a retrospective review, Heath McCoy stated that "Star Star" "epitomized the excess of the seventies".

== Personnel ==
Credits are adapted from Philippe Margotin and Jean-Michel Guesdon's book All the Songs.

The Rolling Stones

- Mick Jagger – lead vocals
- Keith Richards – backing vocals, electric guitar
- Mick Taylor – electric guitar
- Bill Wyman – bass guitar
- Charlie Watts – drums

Additional personnel and production

- Ian Stewart – piano
- Bobby Keys – saxophone
- Jimmy Miller – producer
- Andy Johns – sound engineer
- Rob Fraboni – sound engineer
- Baker Bigsby – sound engineer
- Carlton Lee – assistant sound engineer
- Howard Kilgour – assistant sound engineer
- Doug Bennett – assistant sound engineer

== Charts ==
Chart (1974)	Peak position
Germany (GfK)	32
Netherlands (Single Top 100)	16
Sweden (Tio i Topp)	15
Switzerland (Schweizer Hitparade)	7

== Cover versions ==
- In 1978, the Swedish artist Magnus Uggla did a punk rock cover of the song with lyrics in Swedish called "Stjärnluder" ("Star Whore") on his album Vittring.
- Joan Jett included a completely uncensored version as an unlisted hidden track on the cassette version of her 1983 album Album [MCA, MCAC-5437], which resulted in a ban of this tape by Walmart and other stores. MCA then issued a second cassette version ["Album Only Version"] in a red plastic box [ MCA, MCAC-5445] that deleted the objectionable song. The song reappeared on her Flashback compilation in 1993.
- Croatian band Psihomodo Pop covered the song as "Starfucker" on their album Srebrne svinje in 1993, winning both the Zagreb Film Festival prize in 1994 and the Porin award for the best music video in 1995.

== See also ==
- "Schoolboy Blues"
