= West Indies Records Limited =

Defunct recording studio in Kingston, Jamaica

West Indies Records Limited (WIRL) was a recording studio in Kingston, Jamaica, established by future Prime Minister Edward Seaga in 1958. As he increasingly focused on his political career he sold the studio to Byron Lee in 1964, who renamed it Dynamic Sounds. Dynamic became one of the best-equipped studios in the Caribbean, attracting both local and international recording artists including Eric Clapton, Paul Simon and the Rolling Stones.

== History ==
Seaga recruited local artists from Vere John's talent show. WIRL recorded artists including Higgs and Wilson and Byron Lee and the Dragonaires. Byron Lee and the Dragonaires recorded their debut single "Dumplin's" in 1959 at WIRL. Higgs and Wilson's track "Oh Manny Oh" sold more than 50,000 copies in Jamaica in 1960. West Indies Records Limited became the most successful record company in the West Indies. WIRL had the franchise for Columbia Records in Jamaica. Trojan Records handled the studio's albums abroad, and released compilations of the studio's recordings. WIRL also established a Barbadian division.

=== Dynamic Sounds ===
Seaga, who was pursuing his political career, sold the studio to Byron Lee in 1964 after fire had destroyed the pressing plant on the same site. Lee renamed it Dynamic Sounds and soon rebuilt a new pressing facility on the site. It soon became one of the best-equipped studios in the Caribbean, attracting both local and international recording artists, including Eric Clapton, Paul Simon and the Rolling Stones (who recorded their No. 1 song "Angie" there). Lee's productions included Boris Gardiner's Reggae Happening, Hopeton Lewis's Grooving Out on Life, and the Slickers' "Johnny Too Bad". Dynamic also acts as one of Jamaica's leading record distributors.

In Jamaica, Dynamic released records from Toots & the Maytals, Eric Donaldson, John Holt, Barry Biggs, Freddie McKay, Tommy McCook, and Max Romeo on various imprints including Jaguar, Panther, Afrik, and Dragon. Notable recordings there included "Murder She Wrote" by Chaka Demus & Pliers.
