= Rolling Stones Records =

Record label formed by English rock band the Rolling Stones

- Parent company: Promotone BV
- Founded: 1970
- Founder: The Rolling Stones
- Defunct: 1992
- Status: Inactive
- Distributors: Atco/Atlantic (1971-1984); WEA (1971-1977); EMI (1978-1984); Columbia/CBS/Sony (1986-1991)
- Country of origin: United States
- Location: US Company

The standard yellow record label of Rolling Stones Records LPs, including the red tongue and lips logo

Rolling Stones Records was the record label formed by the Rolling Stones members Mick Jagger, Keith Richards, Mick Taylor, Charlie Watts, and Bill Wyman in 1970, after their recording contract with Decca Records expired. The label was initially headed by Marshall Chess, the son of Chess Records founder Leonard Chess. It was first distributed in the United States by Atlantic Records subsidiary Atco Records. On 1 April 1971, the band signed a distribution deal for five albums with Ahmet Ertegun, acting on behalf of Atlantic Records. In the US, the albums were distributed by Atlantic until 1984. In the UK, Rolling Stones Records were distributed by WEA from 1971 to 1977 and by EMI from 1978 to 1984. In 1986, Columbia Records started distributing it in the United States and CBS for the rest of the world until 1991. It was discontinued in 1992 when the band signed to Virgin Records in partnership under their company Promotone BV instead, but the tongue and lips logo remains on all post-1970 Rolling Stones releases.

== History ==
In its original concept, the label was formed to ensure the Rolling Stones would retain the rights over their own music, while also giving each bandmember the option to release solo albums. The first album to be released was Brian Jones Presents the Pipes of Pan at Joujouka in 1971, a pioneering world music LP. In 1972 the label released Jamming with Edward!, a collection of tracks recorded by Jagger, Wyman, and Watts with Nicky Hopkins and Ry Cooder in 1969.

Bill Wyman released two solo albums through the label, Monkey Grip in 1974 and Stone Alone in 1976. Wyman found that the label's promotional and sales people paid very little attention to him, as the Rolling Stones had albums due out shortly after both releases which were the subject of major marketing campaigns. As a result, Wyman chose to record his next solo album with A&M.

The label also released a solo single by Richards in December 1978, featuring a rendition of Chuck Berry's "Run Rudolph Run" backed by a version of Jimmy Cliff's "The Harder They Come".

== Other artists ==
Unlike Apple Records, Grunt Records, Purple Records, or Swan Song Records (the vanity labels of the Beatles, Jefferson Airplane, Deep Purple, and Led Zeppelin respectively), Rolling Stones Records never made much of an effort to sign outside artists. Kracker, a Cuban American rock group produced by Rolling Stones producer, Jimmy Miller, was the first outside act to be signed to Rolling Stones Records in 1973. Kracker, along with Billy Preston, opened the show for the Stones during their 1973 European Tour. John Phillips was signed to Rolling Stones Records in 1976.

=== Peter Tosh ===
In 1977 Peter Tosh, a former member of Bob Marley's band the Wailers signed a recording deal with Rolling Stones Records. His debut album on the label, Bush Doctor, which featured Jagger on the track "Don't Look Back", was moderately successful. Despite further moderate success, Tosh left the label in 1981 due to personal problems with Keith Richards and Mick Jagger, his band members and the recent passing of Bob Marley.

== 1980s to the end ==
Jagger released his first solo albums, She's the Boss and Primitive Cool, in 1985 and 1987 respectively, through a newly conceived partnership between Rolling Stones Records and CBS Records (now Sony Music). Thus the trademark Rolling Stones logo was affixed to each record and the label "Rolling Stones Records" was also printed on each new release, which angered Richards. In fact, through the 1980s and early 1990s, "Rolling Stones Records" continued to be printed on the labels of all new releases up through Flashpoint (1991). However, as the back catalogue has been shifted to Virgin/EMI, these markers are the last vapour trails of Rolling Stones Records. In 2008, the group switched distribution of Rolling Stones Records back catalogue material as well as new material to Polydor Records in the UK, and Interscope Records in the US (both imprints of Universal Music Group, also distributor of their pre-1971 catalogue as UMG is the distributor for ABKCO Records).

== See also ==
- Lists of record labels
- 1970 in music
