= List of awards and nominations received by the Rolling Stones =

This is a list of awards received by the English rock band the Rolling Stones.

== Awards and nominations ==
=== Berlin Music Video Awards ===
Year	Nominee / work	Award	Result	Ref.
2021	"Criss Cross"	Best Editor	Nominated	

=== Billboard Music Awards ===
Year	Nominee / work	Award	Result	Ref.
1986	Themselves	Top Billboard 200 Artist	Nominated	
1986	Themselves	Top Hot 100 Artist	Nominated	
1986	Dirty Work	Top Billboard 200 Album	Nominated	
1986	Dirty Work	Top Compact Disk	Nominated	
1986	"Harlem Shuffle"	Top Dance Club Play Single	Nominated	
1986	"One Hit (To the Body)"	Top Rock Song	Nominated	
1994	Themselves	Artist Achievement Award	Won	
2015	Themselves	Top Touring Artist	Nominated	
2016	Themselves	Top Touring Artist	Nominated	
2016	Themselves	Top Duo/Group	Nominated	

=== Billboard Touring Awards ===
Year	Nominee / work	Award	Result
2006	A Bigger Bang Tour	Top Tour	Won
2006	A Bigger Bang Tour	Top Draw	Won
2013	50 & Counting Tour	Concert Marketing & Promotion Award	Won
2013	Themselves	Eventful Fans' Choice Award	Nominated
2013	O2 Arena, London, Nov. 25, 29 2012	Top Boxscore	Nominated
2013	United Center, Chicago, May 28, 31, June 1	Top Boxscore	Nominated
2014	Tokyo Dome	Top Boxscore	Won
2015	Zip Code Tour	Top Tour	Nominated
2022	No Filter Tour	Top Tour	Won
2022	No Filter Tour	Top Rock Tour	Won

=== Classic Rock Roll of Honour Awards ===
Year	Nominee / work	Award	Result	Ref.
2010	Exile on Main St.	Reissue of the Year	Won	
2011	Some Girls	Reissue of the Year	Nominated	
2011	Brussels Affair (Live 1973)	Best Live Band	Nominated	
2011	Some Girls: Live in Texas '78	DVD of the Year	Nominated	
2011	"No Spare Parts"	Song of the Year	Nominated	
2012	"Doom and Gloom"	Song of the Year	Nominated	
2012	"Start Me Up"	Best Commercial	Nominated	
2012	50x50	Best Book	Nominated	
2012	Themselves	Tour of the Year	Nominated	
2013	Themselves	Band of the Year	Won	
2014	Sweet Summer Sun – Hyde Park Live	Film of the Year	Nominated	
2015	Sticky Fingers (Deluxe/Super Deluxe)	Reissue of the Year	Nominated	
2016	Their Satanic Majesties Request: 50th Anniversary Edition	Reissue of the Year	Nominated	
2016	Themselves	Artist of the Year	Nominated	
2016	"Ride 'Em On Down"	Song of the Year	Nominated	
2016	Blue & Lonesome	Album of the Year	Nominated	
2016	Zip Code Tour	Tour of the Year	Nominated	
2016	The Rolling Stones: Havana Moon	Best New Live Album or Video	Nominated	
2016	Totally Stripped	Best Archival Live Album or Video	Nominated	
2017	Stones in Air	Best Archival Live Album or Video	Nominated	
2017	Sticky Fingers	Best New Live Album or Video	Nominated	
2017	Their Satanic Majesties Request: 50th Anniversary Edition	Best Box Set or Reissue	Nominated	

=== Denmark GAFFA Awards ===
Year	Nominee / work	Award	Result	Ref.
1996	Themselves	Best Foreign Live Act	Nominated	
1999	Themselves	Best Foreign Live Act	Won	

=== Grammy Awards ===
Year	Nominee / work	Award	Result
1979	Some Girls	Album of the Year	Nominated
1982	Tattoo You	Best Rock Performance by a Duo or Group with Vocal	Nominated
1984	Let's Spend the Night Together	Best Video Album	Nominated
1987	"Harlem Shuffle"	Best Rock Performance by a Duo or Group with Vocal	Nominated
1987	Themselves	Grammy Lifetime Achievement Award	Won
1990	"Mixed Emotions"	Best Rock Performance by a Duo or Group with Vocal	Nominated
1991	"Almost Hear You Sigh"	Best Rock Performance by a Duo or Group with Vocal	Nominated
1995	"Love Is Strong"	Best Music Video, Short Form	Won
1995	Voodoo Lounge	Best Rock Album	Won
1998	Bridges to Babylon	Best Rock Album	Nominated
1998	"Anybody Seen My Baby?"	Best Pop Performance by a Duo or Group with Vocal	Nominated
2006	A Bigger Bang	Best Rock Album	Nominated
2014	"Doom and Gloom"	Best Rock Song	Nominated
2018	Blue & Lonesome	Best Traditional Blues Album	Won
2024	"Angry"	Best Rock Song	Nominated
2025	Hackney Diamonds	Best Rock Album	Won

Grammy Hall of Fame

Year	Nominee / work	Award	Result
1998	"(I Can't Get No) Satisfaction"	Grammy Hall of Fame	Inducted
1999	Beggars Banquet	Grammy Hall of Fame	Inducted
1999	Sticky Fingers	Grammy Hall of Fame	Inducted
2005	Let It Bleed	Grammy Hall of Fame	Inducted
2012	Exile on Main St.	Grammy Hall of Fame	Inducted
2014	"Honky Tonk Women"	Grammy Hall of Fame	Inducted
2018	"Paint It Black"	Grammy Hall of Fame	Inducted

=== ECHO Awards ===
Year	Nominee / work	Award	Result
1998	Themselves 4	Best International Group	Nominated
2003	Themselves 4	Best International Group	Nominated
2006	Themselves 4	Best International Group	Nominated
2012	Themselves 4	Best International Rock/Alternative Act	Nominated
2017	Themselves 4	Best International Group	Nominated
2017	Blue & Lonesome	Album of the Year	Nominated

=== Hungarian Music Awards ===
Year	Nominee / work	Award	Result
1995	Voodoo Lounge	Best Foreign Album	Nominated
2006	A Bigger Bang	Best Foreign Rock Album	Nominated
2017	Blue & Lonesome	Pop/Rock Album of the Year	Nominated

=== London International Awards ===
Year	Nominee / work	Award	Result
2013	"Doom and Gloom"	Best Editing	Nominated
2017	"Ride 'Em On Down"	Best Editing	Nominated
2017	"Ride 'Em On Down"	Best Music Video	Nominated
2017	"Ride 'Em On Down"	Best Direction	Bronze

=== MOJO Awards ===
Year	Nominee / work	Award	Result
2005	Rock and Roll Circus	Vision Award	Nominated

=== MTV Video Music Awards ===
Year	Nominee / work	Award	Result
1984	"Undercover of the Night"	Best Concept Video	Nominated
1986	"Harlem Shuffle"	Best Group Video	Nominated
1994	Themselves	Video Vanguard Award	Won
1995	"Love Is Strong"	Best Special Effects	Won
1995	"Love Is Strong"	Best Cinematography	Won
1995	"Love Is Strong"	Best Group Video	Nominated

=== NME Awards ===
Year	Nominee / work	Award	Result
1964	Mick Jagger	British New Disc or TV Singer	Won
1964	Themselves	British Rhythm and Blues	Won
1965	"(I Can't Get No) Satisfaction"	Best New Disc Of The Year	Won
1966	Themselves	Best R&B Group	Won
1967	Themselves	Best R&B Group	Won
1968	Themselves	Best R&B Group	Won
1978	Some Girls	Best Dressed Sleeve	Won
2000	Themselves	Best Band Ever	Nominated
2009	Shine a Light	Best DVD	Nominated
2012	Some Girls	Best Reissue	Nominated
2013	Crossfire Hurricane	Best Music Film	Won
2013	Themselves	Best Live Band	Won
2013	50	Best Book	Nominated
2013	The Rolling Stones 50th anniversary show at London's O2 Arena	Music Moment of the Year	Nominated
2014	Rolling Stones headline Glastonbury	Music Moment of the Year	Nominated
2016	Sticky Fingers	Best Reissue	Nominated
2017	The Rolling Stones: Havana Moon	Best Music Film	Nominated

=== Pollstar Concert Industry Awards ===
Year	Nominee / work	Award	Result	Ref.
1990	Steel Wheels/Urban Jungle Tour	Major Tour Of The Year	Won	
1990	Steel Wheels/Urban Jungle Tour	Concert Industry Event Of The Year	Won	
1990	Steel Wheels/Urban Jungle Tour	Most Creative Stage Production	Won	
1995	Voodoo Lounge Tour	Most Creative Stage Production	Nominated	
1995	Voodoo Lounge Tour	Major Tour Of The Year	Nominated	
1996	Voodoo Lounge Tour	Major Tour Of The Year	Nominated	
1996	Voodoo Lounge Tour	Most Creative Stage Production	Nominated	
1998	Bridges to Babylon Tour	Most Creative Stage Production	Won	
1998	Bridges to Babylon Tour	Major Tour Of The Year	Nominated	
1999	Bridges to Babylon Tour	Major Tour Of The Year	Nominated	
1999	Bridges to Babylon Tour	Most Creative Stage Production	Won	
2003	Licks Tour	Major Tour Of The Year	Nominated	
2004	Licks Tour	Major Tour Of The Year	Nominated	
2006	A Bigger Bang Tour	Major Tour Of The Year	Nominated	
2006	A Bigger Bang Tour	Most Creative Stage Production	Nominated	
2007	A Bigger Bang Tour	Most Creative Stage Production	Nominated	
2007	A Bigger Bang Tour	Major Tour Of The Year	Nominated	

=== Porin Awards ===
Year	Nominee / work	Award	Result
1998	Bridges to Babylon	Best Foreign Album	Won
1998	"Anybody Seen My Baby?"	Best Foreign Video	Won
1999	Bridges to Babylon Tour '97–98	Best Foreign Music Film	Won
2006	A Bigger Bang	Best Foreign Album	Won
2006	"Streets of Love"	Best Foreign Song	Won
2008	The Biggest Bang	Best Foreign Music Film	Won
2014	Hyde Park Live	Best Foreign Music Film	Nominated

=== TVZ Awards ===
Year	Nominee / work	Award	Result	Ref.
1996	Themselves	Best International Group	Won	

=== Q Awards ===
Year	Nominee / work	Award	Result
1990	Themselves	Best Live Act	Won
1999	Themselves	Best Live Act	Nominated
2013	Live at Hyde Park, London	Best Event	Nominated
2017	Havana Moon	Best Video	Nominated

=== World Music Awards ===
Year	Nominee / work	Award	Result
2005	Themselves	World's Greatest Touring Band of All Time	Won
2014	GRRR!	World's Best Album	Nominated

=== Žebřík Music Awards ===
Year	Nominee / work	Award	Result	Ref.
1994	"Love Is Strong"	Best International Song	Nominated	
1994	"Love Is Strong"	Best International Video	Nominated	
1994	Themselves	Best International Group	Nominated	
1995	Themselves	Best International Enjoyment	Nominated	
1997	Themselves	Best International Group	Nominated	
1997	Mick Jagger	Best International Personality	Nominated	
1997	Bridges to Babylon	Best International Album	Nominated	
1997	"Anybody Seen My Baby?"	Best International Song	Nominated	
1997	"Anybody Seen My Baby?"	Best International Video	Nominated	
1998	Themselves	Best International Enjoyment	Nominated	
2016	Blue & Lonesome	Best International Album	Nominated	

Others awards

Year	Awards	Work	Category	Result
1977	Brit Awards	Themselves	Best British Group	Nominated
1981	American Music Awards	Themselves	Favorite Pop/Rock Band/Duo/Group	Nominated
1989	Rock and Roll Hall of Fame	Themselves	Performer	Inducted
1990	Japan Gold Disc Awards	Steel Wheels	Best Album of the Year - Rock/Folk	Won
1991	Japan Gold Disc Awards	25×5: the Continuing Adventures of the Rolling Stones	Video of the Year	Won
1991	CableACE Awards	25×5: the Continuing Adventures of the Rolling Stones	Performance in a Music Special or Series	Nominated
1991	ASCAP Pop Music Awards	"Mixed Emotions"	Most Performed Song	Won
1991	Juno Awards	Themselves	International Entertainer of the Year	Won
1995	Brit Awards	"Love Is Strong"	Best British Video	Nominated
1995	Blockbuster Entertainment Awards	Themselves	Favorite Group - Classic Rock	Nominated
1996	D&AD Awards	"Like a Rolling Stone"	Pop Promo Video (Individual)	Yellow Pencil
1998	Blockbuster Entertainment Awards	Themselves	Favorite Group - Classic Rock	Nominated
1998	GAFFA Awards	Themselves	Årets Udenlandske Livenavn	Won
2002	VH1 Big in 2002 Awards	Themselves	Rockin' & Rulin	Nominated
2011	Silver Clef Awards	Themselves	Best Live Act	Nominated
2013	Brit Awards	Themselves	Best British Live Act	Nominated
2016	Abilu Music Awards	Blue & Lonesome	International Classic Album of the Year	Won
2017	ARIA Music Awards	Themselves	Best International Artist	Nominated
2017	Jazz FM Awards	Themselves	Blues Artist of the Year	Won
2017	Jazz FM Awards	Blue & Lonesome	Album of the Year	Won
2021	Music Week Awards	Themselves	Catalogue Marketing Campaign	Nominated
