= Grrr Live! =

Live album by the Rolling Stones
- Released: 10 February 2023
- Recorded: 15 December 2012 (Note: The three Japanese bonus tracks ("Tumbling Dice", "Doom and Gloom" and "The Last Time") were recorded on the first date in Newark, 13 December 2012.)
- Venues: Prudential Center; Newark, New Jersey, US
- Genre: Rock
- Length: 135:00
- Label: Mercury

The Rolling Stones chronology
Licked Live in NYC (2022)	Grrr Live! (2023)	Hackney Diamonds (2023)

Grrr Live! is a live album and concert film by the English rock band the Rolling Stones, released on 10 February 2023. It was recorded on 15 December 2012 at the Prudential Center in Newark, New Jersey as part of the band's 50 & Counting tour, in support of the GRRR! compilation released that year.

It was originally broadcast as the pay-per-view 2012 concert film One More Shot: The Rolling Stones Live before being remixed and re-edited. The concert features guest appearances from Lady Gaga, John Mayer, Gary Clark Jr. The Black Keys, Bruce Springsteen and former Stones guitarist Mick Taylor. Aside from its digital release, the album was released in four physical formats: 3×LP, 2×CD+Blu-ray, 2×CD+DVD and 2×CD. The 2×CD makes an error on the back case, noting "(I Can't Get No) Satisfaction" as Track 12, when it's track 10, with no track 12 on the disc.

== Critical reception ==
Professional ratings
Review scores
Source	Rating
AllMusic	3/5 stars
American Songwriter	4.5/5 stars
Clash	8/10
Rolling Stone Germany	3.5/5 stars

Stephen Thomas Erlewine of AllMusic wrote that the "set list offers few surprises — if you don't recognize a song, that's because it's a new tune added to GRRR! — but the Stones are in fine form, never seeming tired of playing the hits in a fashion that guarantees a splendid time for one and all". Emma Harrison of Clash called the concert "one of the most memorable shows in the band's history" and the compilation "unequivocally delivers on the description that this body of work is their definitive Greatest Hits live collection". Reviewing the album for American Songwriter, Lee Zimmerman felt that there is "ample evidence of a band still in their provocative prime" and "the fact that the group still maintains the same verve and veracity so many years provides a testimony to both duration and durability".

== Track listing ==
All tracks are written by Mick Jagger and Keith Richards, except where noted.

Grrr Live! track listing
No.	Title	Length
1.	"Get Off of My Cloud"	3:53
2.	"The Last Time"	4:14
3.	"It's Only Rock 'n Roll (But I Like It)"	4:37
4.	"Paint It Black"	5:06
5.	"Gimme Shelter" (featuring Lady Gaga)	7:04
6.	"Wild Horses"	5:48
7.	"Going Down" (featuring John Mayer and Gary Clark Jr.; written by Don Nix)	6:32
8.	"Dead Flowers"	5:01
9.	"Who Do You Love?" (featuring the Black Keys; written by Ellas McDaniel)	4:19
10.	"Doom and Gloom"	4:34
11.	"One More Shot" (written by Jagger, Richards and Steve Jordan)	3:44
12.	"Miss You"	6:59
13.	"Honky Tonk Women"	4:32
14.	"Band Introductions"	4:28
15.	"Before They Make Me Run"	4:22
16.	"Happy"	4:08
17.	"Midnight Rambler" (featuring Mick Taylor)	12:02
18.	"Start Me Up"	4:39
19.	"Tumbling Dice" (featuring Bruce Springsteen)	4:53
20.	"Brown Sugar"	5:24
21.	"Sympathy for the Devil"	7:04
22.	"You Can't Always Get What You Want" (featuring the Choir of Trinity Wall Street)	8:50
23.	"Jumpin' Jack Flash"	5:47
24.	"(I Can't Get No) Satisfaction"	6:59
Total length:		135:00

Grrr Live! bonus tracks on DVD/Blu-ray
No.	Title	Length
1.	"Respectable" (featuring John Mayer)	5:10
2.	"Around and Around" (written by Chuck Berry)	3:00
3.	"Gimme Shelter"	6:30

== Personnel ==
The Rolling Stones

- Mick Jagger – lead vocals, guitars, harmonica
- Keith Richards – lead vocals on "Before They Make Me Run" and "Happy", rhythm guitar
- Ronnie Wood – lead guitar
- Charlie Watts – drums

Additional personnel

- Darryl Jones – bass, backing vocals
- Chuck Leavell – keyboards, backing vocals, cowbell on "Honky Tonk Women"
- Bernard Fowler – backing vocals, percussion
- Lisa Fischer – backing vocals, percussion
- Bobby Keys – saxophone
- Tim Ries – saxophone, keyboards
- Matt Clifford – French horn on "You Can't Always Get What You Want"
- Choir of Trinity Wall Street – choir on "You Can't Always Get What You Want"

== Charts ==
Chart performance for Grrr Live!
Chart (2023)	Peak position
Australian Albums (ARIA)	96
Austrian Albums (Ö3 Austria)	2
Belgian Albums (Ultratop Flanders)	3
Belgian Albums (Ultratop Wallonia)	5
Dutch Albums (Album Top 100)	2
French Albums (SNEP)	55
German Albums (Offizielle Top 100)	3
Hungarian Albums (MAHASZ)	34
Italian Albums (FIMI)	81
Japanese Hot Albums (Billboard Japan)	90
Portuguese Albums (AFP)	7
Scottish Albums (Official Charts)	6
Spanish Albums (Promusicae)	13
Swiss Albums (Schweizer Hitparade)	2
UK Albums (Official Charts)	21
US Billboard 200	193

Chart (2026)	Peak position
French Rock & Metal Albums (SNEP)	36
