= 14 On Fire =

2014 concert tour by the Rolling Stones

- Tour by The Rolling Stones
- Promotional poster for the tour
- Location: Asia; Europe; Oceania
- Start date: 21 February 2014
- End date: 22 November 2014
- Legs: 3
- No. of shows: 29
- Box office: $165.2 million ($224.67 million in 2025 dollars)

The Rolling Stones concert chronology
- 50 & Counting (2012–13); 14 On Fire (2014); Zip Code (2015)

14 On Fire was a concert tour by the Rolling Stones, which started on 21 February 2014 in Abu Dhabi. It was a follow-up to the 50 & Counting tour which celebrated the 50th anniversary of the band. The tour was very much similar to 50 & Counting just as the "Urban Jungle" portion of the Stones' Steel Wheels/Urban Jungle Tour in 1990 was similar to the "Steel Wheels" portion in 1989. 14 On Fire had the same stage design, setlist structure, and clothing/merchandise as 50 & Counting. Also, Mick Taylor was a guest throughout this tour as in 50 & Counting.

== History ==
On 3 December 2013, the full Australian and New Zealand tour dates were announced and being billed as the 14 On Fire tour. The same day, they announced four other dates in Asia and for the first time one show in Abu Dhabi, Middle East. On 17 January 2014, they announced that they will play a one-off show at the Shanghai Mercedes-Benz Arena on 12 March 2014. On 13 February 2014, they announced that they will play a one-night only show at the Singapore Marina Bay Sands Grand Ballroom on 15 March 2014. On 12 March 2014, they announced that they will headline the Pinkpop Festival in the Netherlands and the TW Classic Festival in Belgium in June 2014. On 17 March 2014, they announced two one-off shows in Germany in June while more major shows in Europe in May, June and July 2014 were announced the following week.

Following L'Wren Scott's sudden death on 17 March in New York City, Mick Jagger, her life partner since 2001, flew to Los Angeles while the rest of the band returned to England. Scott's body was flown to Los Angeles where Jagger and Scott's brother, Randy Bambrough, coordinated an intimate service on 25 March with about 70 people in attendance. All the Australia and New Zealand shows were subsequently postponed with new dates to be scheduled between 25 October and 22 November 2014. Those dates were announced on 15 April 2014 while two new shows were added (1 at the Perth Arena and 1 at Hope Estate, Hunter Valley) along with the originally scheduled shows. There were to be a total of 8 shows in Australia and 1 in New Zealand. The performance on 25 October at the Adelaide Oval was the first be held at the venue since its complete redevelopment.

On 4 June 2014, the Rolling Stones performed for the first time in Israel in what was dubbed a historic appearance, the Haaretz going as far as describing the concert as being "Historic with a capital H". To an extent, the Stones' Israeli debut provided a means of closure vis-à-vis the early background of Rock n' Roll in Israel; in 1965, Prime Minister David Ben Gurion and numerous politicians in the Knesset, Israel's parliament, had believed at the time that rock performances might corrupt the minds of the Israeli youth. Accordingly, at the time, the State of Israel had cancelled scheduled performances of notable artists.

On 6 November 2014, they were forced to cancel the show at Hanging Rock scheduled for 8 November after Jagger had developed a throat infection. He was under strict doctor's orders to rest his vocal chords in order to recuperate for the remainder of the tour.

== Tour rehearsals and secret warm-up show ==
In preparation for the tour, prior to the first show, the Rolling Stones rehearsed 65 songs in Bondy near Paris from 3 to 14 February 2014 (in a rehearsal studio named Planet Live). On 14 February 2014, the 10th and last day of rehearsals, the Rolling Stones invited fans to attend an intimate show at the rehearsals studio in Bondy. Thus, the band performed an impromptu secret warm-up show playing 11 songs to the first 27 fans among a total of approximately 50 ones which were initially standing in front of the studio waiting for the band to appear. For the summer leg of the tour in Europe, the band rehearsed in London from 14 to 22 May before moving final rehearsals to the Telenor Arena in Oslo, Norway where they played their first show on 26 May 2014.

== Set list ==
This set list is representative of the opening performance in Abu Dhabi. It does not represent all concerts for the duration of the tour.

1. "Start Me Up"
2. "It's Only Rock 'n' Roll (But I Like It)"
3. "You Got Me Rocking"
4. "Tumbling Dice"
5. "Emotional Rescue"
6. "Angie"
7. "Doom and Gloom"
8. "Out of Control"
9. "Paint It Black"
10. "Honky Tonk Women"
11. "Slipping Away"
12. "Before They Make Me Run"
13. "Midnight Rambler"
14. "Miss You"
15. "Gimme Shelter"
16. "Jumpin' Jack Flash"
17. "Sympathy for the Devil"
18. "Brown Sugar"
19. "You Can't Always Get What You Want"
20. "(I Can't Get No) Satisfaction"

== Tour dates ==
List of concerts, showing date, city, country, venue, opening act, tickets sold, number of available tickets and amount of gross revenue
Date	City	Country	Venue	Opening act(s)	Attendance	Revenue
Asia
21 February 2014	Abu Dhabi	United Arab Emirates	du Arena	—N/a	30,246 / 30,246	$6,496,663
26 February 2014	Tokyo	Japan	Tokyo Dome	—N/a	147,493 / 147,493	$27,946,751
4 March 2014	Tokyo	Japan	Tokyo Dome	—N/a	147,493 / 147,493	$27,946,751
6 March 2014	Tokyo	Japan	Tokyo Dome	—N/a	147,493 / 147,493	$27,946,751
9 March 2014	Macau		CotaiArena	—N/a	10,000 / 10,000	$3,079,875
12 March 2014	Shanghai	China	Mercedes-Benz Arena	—N/a	10,751 / 10,751	$1,923,580
15 March 2014	Singapore		Marina Bay Sands	—N/a	5,554 / 5,554	$2,168,532
Europe
26 May 2014	Oslo	Norway	Telenor Arena	BigBang	22,405 / 22,405	$5,177,648
29 May 2014 (Note: The 29 May 2014 concert in Lisbon, Portugal is a part of the Rock in Rio festival.)	Lisbon	Portugal	Parque da Bela Vista	—N/a	—N/a	—N/a
1 June 2014	Zurich	Switzerland	Letzigrund	The Temperance Movement	48,622 / 48,622	$10,755,976
4 June 2014	Tel Aviv	Israel	Yarkon Park	Rami Fortis	48,167 / 48,167	$8,276,709
7 June 2014 (Note: The 7 June 2014 concert in Landgraaf, Netherlands is a part of the Pinkpop Festival.)	Landgraaf	Netherlands	Megaland	—N/a	—N/a	—N/a
10 June 2014	Berlin	Germany	Waldbühne	The Temperance Movement	21,258 / 21,258	$4,956,893
13 June 2014	Saint-Denis	France	Stade de France	The Struts	76,495 / 76,495	$10,042,426
16 June 2014	Vienna	Austria	Ernst-Happel-Stadion	The Temperance Movement	57,708 / 57,708	$9,333,996
19 June 2014	Düsseldorf	Germany	Esprit Arena	The Temperance Movement	44,224 / 44,224	$8,232,572
22 June 2014	Rome	Italy	Circus Maximus	John Mayer	71,527 / 71,527	$7,729,186
25 June 2014	Madrid	Spain	Estadio Santiago Bernabéu	Leiva	57,416 / 57,416	$8,350,682
28 June 2014 (Note: The 28 June 2014 concert in Werchter, Belgium is a part of the TW Classic festival.)	Werchter	Belgium	Werchter Festival Grounds	—N/a	—N/a	—N/a
1 July 2014	Stockholm	Sweden	Tele2 Arena	BigBang; Amanda Jenssen	37,009 / 37,009	$5,383,992
3 July 2014 (Note: The 3 July 2014 concert in Roskilde, Denmark is a part of the Roskilde Festival.)	Roskilde	Denmark	Festivalpladsen, Orange Stage	—N/a	—N/a	—N/a
Oceania
25 October 2014	Adelaide	Australia	Adelaide Oval	Jimmy Barnes	54,115 / 54,115	$8,906,058
29 October 2014	Perth	Australia	Perth Arena	—N/a	26,923 / 26,923	$9,808,596
1 November 2014	Perth	Australia	Perth Arena	—N/a	26,923 / 26,923	$9,808,596
5 November 2014	Melbourne	Australia	Rod Laver Arena	—N/a	12,262 / 12,262	$4,878,329
12 November 2014	Sydney	Australia	Allphones Arena	—N/a	14,255 / 14,255	$5,557,366
15 November 2014	Hunter Valley	Australia	Hope Estate	British India; The Preatures	20,297 / 20,297	$5,116,399
18 November 2014	Brisbane	Australia	Brisbane Entertainment Centre	—N/a	10,085 / 10,085	$3,821,453
22 November 2014	Auckland	New Zealand	Mount Smart Stadium	Hunters & Collectors	37,293 / 37,293	$7,250,881
Total					1,159,882 / 1,159,882	$165,194,563

== Personnel ==
=== The Rolling Stones ===
- Mick Jagger – lead vocals, guitars, harmonica, percussion
- Keith Richards – guitars, backing vocals
- Charlie Watts – drums
- Ronnie Wood – guitars

=== Special guest ===
- Mick Taylor – guitars

=== Additional musicians ===
- Darryl Jones – bass guitar
- Chuck Leavell – keyboards
- Lisa Fischer – backing vocals, percussion
- Bobby Keys – saxophone (except Australia & New Zealand)
- Karl Denson – saxophone (Australia & New Zealand only)
- Tim Ries – saxophone, keyboards
- Bernard Fowler – backing vocals, percussion
- Matt Clifford – French horn, keyboards, introduction voice

== See also ==
- The Rolling Stones concerts
