= One More Shot =

One More Shot may refer to:

- One More Shot (2024 film), a British-American action thriller starring Scott Adkins
- One More Shot (2025 film), an Australian comedy starring Emily Browning
- "One More Shot" (song), a 2012 song by the Rolling Stones
- Grrr Live!, a live album and concert film originally broadcast as One More Shot: The Rolling Stones Live
- "One More Shot", a 1983 song written by John Robie
- "One More Shot", a song on the 2014 album Ohio by Stalley
- "One More Shot", an unreleased song by Nicole Scherzinger
- "One More Shot" (Chicago Fire), a 2014 TV episode
- "One More Shot AI", an AI powered music video generator app developed by KRNL S.R.L. in 2025
