= Sixty (tour) =

2022 concert tour by the Rolling Stones

- Continental tour by The Rolling Stones
- Promotional poster for the tour
- Location: Europe
- Start date: 1 June 2022
- End date: 3 August 2022
- No. of shows: 14
- Attendance: 712,641
- Box office: $121,326,763

The Rolling Stones concert chronology
- No Filter Tour (2017–2021); Sixty (2022); Hackney Diamonds Tour (2024)

Sixty was a concert tour by the English rock band the Rolling Stones, celebrating the 60th anniversary of the band’s formation. The tour, announced on 14 March 2022, began on 1 June 2022 in Madrid, Spain, and concluded on 3 August 2022 in Berlin, Germany. It was the first European tour without drummer Charlie Watts following his death in August 2021, and the first time that the Stones performed their 1966 song "Out of Time" live.

== Format ==
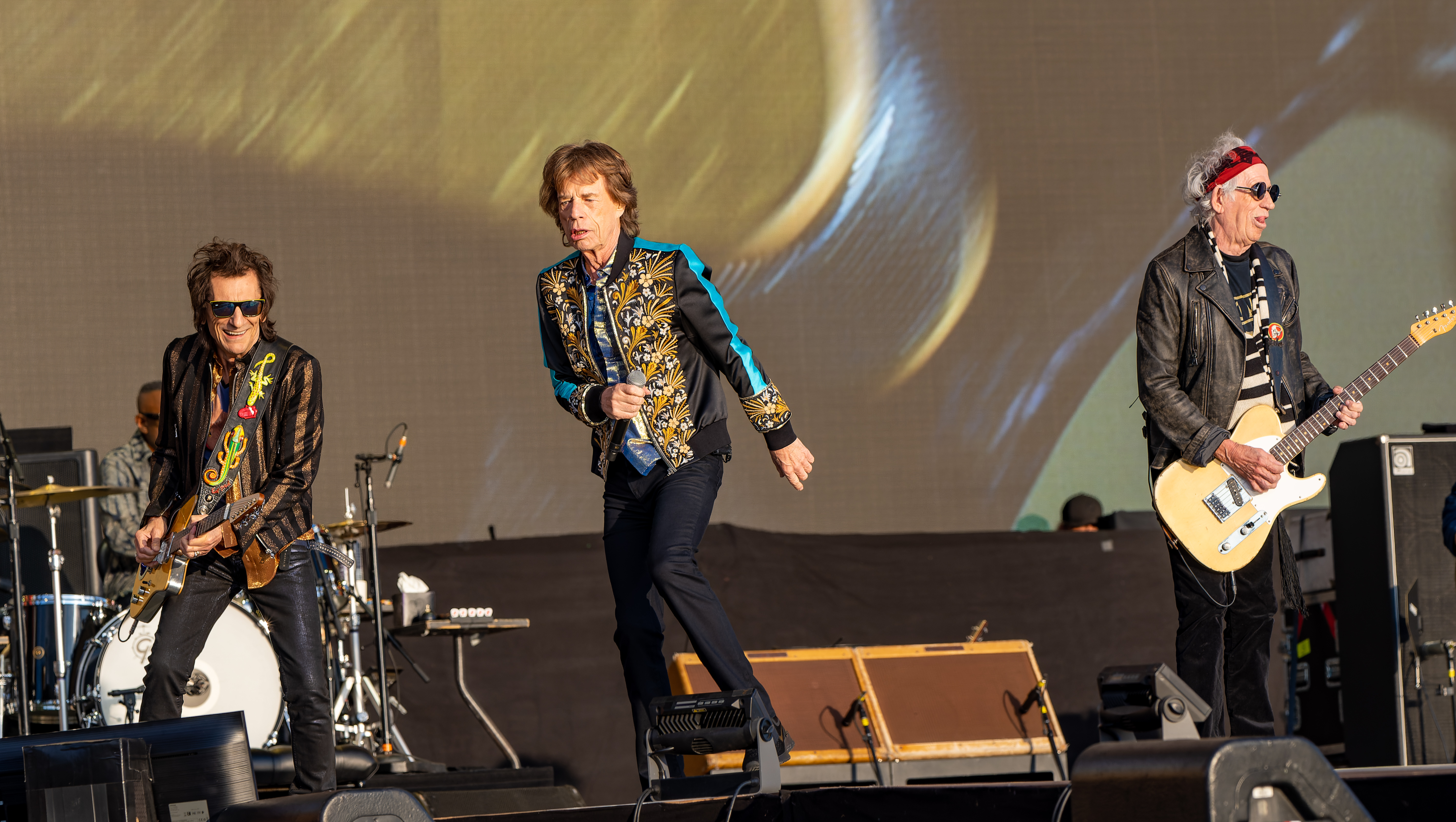
Hyde Park on 3 July 2022

The tour venues announced were typically large outdoor stadiums. An exception was the two Hyde Park, London shows, which were open-space events with a 65,000 capacity.

As has been the case since the No Filter Tour, the stadium shows featured general admission standing areas. Premium-cost gold circle and pit sections closer to the stage were also offered to varying degrees at each venue.

There was no b-stage to which the band wholly relocated; however, a central outward walkway existed where band members typically moved into briefly throughout the shows.

== Setlist ==
The following set list was obtained from the concert held on 1 June 2022 at the Wanda Metropolitano stadium in Madrid. It does not represent all concerts for the duration of the tour.

1. "Street Fighting Man"
2. "19th Nervous Breakdown"
3. "Sad Sad Sad"
4. "Tumbling Dice"
5. "Out of Time"
6. "Beast of Burden"
7. "You Can't Always Get What You Want"
8. "Living in a Ghost Town"
9. "Honky Tonk Women"
10. "Happy"
11. "Slipping Away"
12. "Miss You"
13. "Midnight Rambler"
14. "Start Me Up"
15. "Paint it Black"
16. "Sympathy for the Devil"
17. "Jumpin' Jack Flash"
18. "Gimme Shelter"
19. "(I Can't Get No) Satisfaction"

== Tour dates ==
List of 2022 concerts, showing date, city, country, venue, opening act(s) and tickets sold
Date	City	Country	Venue	Opening act(s)	Attendance	Gross
1 June	Madrid	Spain	Wanda Metropolitano	Sidonie; Vargas Blues Band	52,752 / 52,752	$9,502,011
5 June	Munich	Germany	Olympiastadion	Reef	56,144 / 56,144	$10,484,400
9 June	Liverpool	England	Anfield	Echo & the Bunnymen	36,917 / 36,917	$6,194,285
21 June	Milan	Italy	San Siro	Ghost Hounds	57,204 / 57,204	$8,315,762
25 June (Note: The concerts on 25 June 2022 and 3 July 2022 in London were part of the British Summer Time Hyde Park Festival)	London	England	Hyde Park	—N/a	130,000 / 130,000	$23,216,844
3 July	London	England	Hyde Park	—N/a	130,000 / 130,000	$23,216,844
7 July (Note: The concert on 7 July 2022 in Amsterdam was originally scheduled on 13 June 2022, but it was rescheduled after Mick Jagger tested positive for COVID-19.)	Amsterdam	Netherlands	Johan Cruyff Arena	Ghost Hounds	51,592 / 51,592	$9,241,437
11 July	Brussels	Belgium	King Baudouin Stadium	Kaleo	47,089 / 47,089	$8,356,768
15 July	Vienna	Austria	Ernst-Happel-Stadion	Bilderbuch	57,141 / 57,141	$9,498,486
19 July	Lyon	France	Groupama Stadium	Nothing but Thieves	49,608 / 49,608	$8,222,066
23 July	Paris	France	Hippodrome de Longchamp	Ayron Jones	56,939 / 56,939	$7,362,881
27 July	Gelsenkirchen	Germany	Veltins-Arena	Zucchero	44,981 / 44,981	$8,358,668
31 July	Stockholm	Sweden	Friends Arena	Thåström	50,889 / 50,889	$6,916,424
3 August	Berlin	Germany	Waldbühne	Ghost Hounds	21,285 / 21,285	$5,656,731
Total					712,641 / 712,641 (100%)	$121,326,763

=== Cancelled dates ===
List of cancelled concerts
Date (2022)	City	Country	Venue	Opening act	Reason
17 June	Bern	Switzerland	Wankdorf Stadium	Ghost Hounds	COVID positive case

== Personnel ==
=== The Rolling Stones ===
- Mick Jagger – lead vocals, guitar, harmonica, percussion
- Keith Richards – guitars, backing and lead vocals
- Ronnie Wood – guitars

=== Additional musicians ===
- Chuck Leavell – keyboards, backing vocals
- Bernard Fowler – backing vocals, percussion
- Matt Clifford – keyboards, percussion, French horn
- Darryl Jones – bass
- Tim Ries – saxophone, keyboards
- Karl Denson – saxophone
- Steve Jordan – drums
- Sasha Allen – backing vocals
- Chanel Haynes – backing vocals (on 21 June 2022)
