= GRRR! =

Greatest hits album by the Rolling Stones
- Released: 12 November 2012
- Recorded: 1963–2012
- Genre: Rock
- Length: 144:10 (2 CD); 212:03 (3 CD); 283:36 (4 CD)
- Labels: ABKCO; Interscope
- Producers: The Glimmer Twins; Chris Kimsey; Jimmy Miller; Jeff Bhasker; Emile Haynie; Don Was

The Rolling Stones chronology
Live at Leeds (2012)	GRRR! (2012)	Hyde Park Live (2013)

Singles from GRRR!
- 1. "Doom and Gloom" Released: 11 October 2012; 2. "One More Shot" Released: 8 November 2012 1 January 2013 (re-released as single)

Professional ratings
Aggregate scores
Source	Rating
Metacritic	82/100
Review scores
Source	Rating
AllMusic	4.5/5 stars
BBC Music	favourable
Rolling Stone	4.5/5 stars
The Daily Telegraph	4/5 stars
Uncut	7/10

GRRR! is a greatest hits album by the Rolling Stones. Released on 12 November 2012, it commemorates the band's 50th anniversary. The album features two new songs titled "Doom and Gloom" and "One More Shot", which were recorded in August 2012.

"Doom and Gloom" peaked at No. 61 on the UK Singles Chart, No. 26 on the Billboard Japan Hot 100 and No. 30 on the Billboard Rock Songs chart in October 2012. Rolling Stone magazine named "Doom and Gloom" the 18th best song of 2012.

The album reached No. 3 on the UK Albums Chart and No. 19 on the US Billboard 200.

In support of GRRR!, a Stones concert was recorded on 15 December 2012 at the Prudential Center in Newark, New Jersey, United States, as part of the band's 50 & Counting tour, and broadcast as the pay-per-view 2012 concert film One More Shot: The Rolling Stones Live. It was remixed and re-edited as the live album and concert film Grrr Live!, released on 10 February 2023.

== Editions ==
- 40-track, 2-CD jewel case with 12-page booklet, only sold in Australia, Asia, some European countries and selected American retailers
- 50-track, 3-CD digipak with 12-page booklet
- 50-track, 3-CD box set with 36-page hardcover book and five postcards
- 50-track, 5-12" vinyl box set
- 50-track, 1-Blu-ray Pure Audio, no video, clear Blu-ray case, 12-page booklet, European & Mexico only
- 80-track, 4-CD box set with bonus CD, 7" vinyl, hardcover book, poster, and postcards

== Artwork ==
Walton Ford was commissioned to do the album cover. The artwork depicts a gorilla with the Stones' tongue and lips logo created by John Pasche, an adaptation of Ford's series of King Kong paintings titled "I Don't Like to Look at Him, Jack. It Makes Me Think of that Awful Day on the Island". Ford explained that he "saw the Rolling Stones as a sort of silverback", and the band could be compared to Kong due to "their kind of enormity of their accomplishment over the period of 50 years". The band approved the image, declaring that "The irreverence of Walton Ford's imagery captured the spirit of the tour", but fans were not so welcoming. Ford reacted to the criticism saying "the last people who I wanted to please were Rolling Stones fans", as he felt they "got their own grudges" and "just seem to be always angry at the Rolling Stones for a lot of reasons". Limited editions of the art were made by Ford and put on sale. An augmented reality app allowed to see an animated version of the GRRR! cover. Hingston Studios handled the album's art direction, including the handwritten font used in the cover and its campaign.

== Track listings ==
All songs by Mick Jagger and Keith Richards, except where noted.

=== Origin key ===
- * – Non-album single
- B – Non-album B-side
- RS – The Rolling Stones (1964)
- 1 – The Rolling Stones (1964)
- 1A – England's Newest Hit Makers (1964)
- 2A – 12 × 5 (1964)
- 2 – The Rolling Stones No. 2 (1965)
- 3A – The Rolling Stones, Now! (1965)
- 3 – Out of Our Heads (UK) (1965)
- 4A – Out of Our Heads (US) (1965)
- 5A – December's Children (And Everybody's) (1965)
- BH – Big Hits (High Tide and Green Grass) (1966)
- 4 – Aftermath (UK) (1966)
- 6A – Aftermath (US) (1966)
- 7A – Between the Buttons (US) (1967)
- F – Flowers (1967)
- 6 – Their Satanic Majesties Request (1967)
- 7 – Beggars Banquet (1968)
- TPD – Through the Past, Darkly (Big Hits Vol. 2) (1969)
- 8 – Let It Bleed (1969)
- 9 – Sticky Fingers (1971)
- 10 – Exile on Main St. (1972)
- 11 – Goats Head Soup (1973)
- 12 – It's Only Rock 'n Roll (1974)
- 13 – Black and Blue (1976)
- 14 – Some Girls (1978)
- 15 – Emotional Rescue (1980)
- 16 – Tattoo You (1981)
- 17 – Undercover (1983)
- 18 – Dirty Work (1986)
- 19 – Steel Wheels (1989)
- FP – Flashpoint (1991)
- 20 – Voodoo Lounge (1994)
- S – Stripped (1995)
- 21 – Bridges to Babylon (1997)
- FL – Forty Licks (2002)
- 22 – A Bigger Bang (2005)
- EMS – Exile on Main St. reissue (2010)
- + – New, previously unreleased song (2012)

=== 40-track version ===
Disc one

1. "Come On" (Chuck Berry)* – 1:51
2. "Not Fade Away" (Charles Hardin/Norman Petty)1A – 1:48
3. "It's All Over Now" (Bobby Womack/Shirley Jean Womack)2A – 3:28
4. "Little Red Rooster" (Willie Dixon)3A – 3:06
5. "The Last Time"4A – 3:42
6. "(I Can't Get No) Satisfaction"4A – 3:45
7. "Get Off of My Cloud"5A – 2:56
8. "As Tears Go By" (Jagger/Richards/Andrew Loog Oldham)5A – 2:46
9. "19th Nervous Breakdown"* – 3:58
10. "Have You Seen Your Mother, Baby, Standing in the Shadow?"BH – 2:37
11. "Paint It Black"6A – 3:24
12. "Let's Spend the Night Together"7A – 3:37
13. "Ruby Tuesday"7A – 3:16
14. "Jumpin' Jack Flash"* – 3:43
15. "Street Fighting Man"7 – 3:15
16. "Sympathy for the Devil"7 – 6:19
17. "Honky Tonk Women"* – 3:02
18. "You Can't Always Get What You Want" (single version)8 – 4:48
19. "Gimme Shelter"8 – 4:32
20. "Wild Horses"9 – 5:46

Disc two

1. "Brown Sugar"9 – 3:50
2. "Tumbling Dice"10 – 3:46
3. "It's Only Rock 'n Roll (But I Like It)" (edited version)12 – 4:11
4. "Angie"11 – 4:32
5. "Fool to Cry" (edited version)13 – 4:08
6. "Beast of Burden" (single version)14 – 3:30
7. "Miss You" (7" re-mix version)14 – 3:34
8. "Respectable"14 – 3:09
9. "Emotional Rescue" (edited version)15 – 3:43
10. "Start Me Up"16 – 3:32
11. "Waiting on a Friend"16 – 4:35
12. "Happy"10 – 3:06
13. "Undercover of the Night" (edited version)17 – 4:13
14. "Harlem Shuffle" (Earl Nelson/Robert Relf)18 – 3:23
15. "Mixed Emotions" (single version)19 – 4:00
16. "Love Is Strong"20 – 3:47
17. "Anybody Seen My Baby?" (edited version) (Jagger/Richards/k.d. lang/Ben Mink)21 – 4:07
18. "Don't Stop" (single version)FL – 3:29
19. "Doom and Gloom"+ – 3:58
20. "One More Shot"+ – 3:05

=== 50-track version ===
Disc one

1. "Come On" (Berry)
2. "Not Fade Away" (Hardin/Petty)
3. "It's All Over Now" (Womack/Womack)
4. "Little Red Rooster" (Dixon)
5. "The Last Time"
6. "(I Can't Get No) Satisfaction"
7. "Time Is on My Side" (Jerry Ragovoy)2, 2A
8. "Get Off of My Cloud"
9. "Heart of Stone"3A, 3
10. "19th Nervous Breakdown"
11. "As Tears Go By" (Jagger/Richards/Oldham)
12. "Paint It Black"
13. "Under My Thumb"4, 6A
14. "Have You Seen Your Mother, Baby, Standing in the Shadow?"
15. "Ruby Tuesday"
16. "Let's Spend the Night Together"
17. "We Love You"*

Disc two

1. "Jumpin' Jack Flash"
2. "Honky Tonk Women"
3. "Sympathy for the Devil"
4. "You Can't Always Get What You Want"
5. "Gimme Shelter"
6. "Street Fighting Man"
7. "Wild Horses"
8. "She's a Rainbow"6
9. "Brown Sugar"
10. "Happy"
11. "Tumbling Dice"
12. "Angie"
13. "Rocks Off"10
14. "Doo Doo Doo Doo Doo (Heartbreaker)"11
15. "It's Only Rock 'n Roll (But I Like It)"
16. "Fool to Cry"

Disc three

1. "Miss You"
2. "Respectable"
3. "Beast of Burden"
4. "Emotional Rescue"
5. "Start Me Up"
6. "Waiting on a Friend"
7. "Undercover of the Night"
8. "She Was Hot"17
9. "Streets of Love"22
10. "Harlem Shuffle" (Nelson/Relf)
11. "Mixed Emotions"
12. "Highwire"FP
13. "Love Is Strong"
14. "Anybody Seen My Baby?" (Jagger/Richards/lang/Mink)
15. "Don't Stop"
16. "Doom and Gloom"
17. "One More Shot"

=== 80-track version ===
Disc one

1. "Come On" (Berry)
2. "I Wanna Be Your Man" (John Lennon/Paul McCartney)*
3. "Not Fade Away" (Hardin/Petty)
4. "That's How Strong My Love Is" (Roosevelt Jamison)3, 4A
5. "It's All Over Now" (Womack/Womack)
6. "Little Red Rooster" (Dixon)
7. "The Last Time"
8. "(I Can't Get No) Satisfaction"
9. "Heart of Stone"
10. "Get Off of My Cloud"
11. "She Said Yeah" (Sonny Christy/Roddy Jackson)3, 5A
12. "I'm Free"3, 5A
13. "Play with Fire" (Nanker Phelge)4A
14. "Time Is on My Side" (Ragovoy)
15. "19th Nervous Breakdown"
16. "Paint It Black"
17. "Have You Seen Your Mother, Baby, Standing in the Shadow?"
18. "She's a Rainbow"
19. "Under My Thumb"
20. "Out of Time"4, F
21. "As Tears Go By" (Jagger/Richards/Oldham)

Disc two

1. "Let's Spend the Night Together"
2. "Mother's Little Helper"4
3. "We Love You"
4. "Dandelion"B
5. "Lady Jane"4, 6A
6. "Flight 505"4, 6A
7. "2000 Light Years from Home"6
8. "Ruby Tuesday"
9. "Jumpin' Jack Flash"
10. "Sympathy for the Devil"
11. "Child of the Moon"B
12. "Salt of the Earth"7
13. "Honky Tonk Women"
14. "Midnight Rambler"8
15. "Gimme Shelter"
16. "You Got the Silver"8
17. "You Can't Always Get What You Want"
18. "Street Fighting Man"
19. "Wild Horses"

Disc three

1. "Brown Sugar"
2. "Bitch"9
3. "Tumbling Dice"
4. "Rocks Off"
5. "Happy"
6. "Doo Doo Doo Doo Doo (Heartbreaker)"
7. "Angie"
8. "It's Only Rock 'n Roll (But I Like It)"
9. "Dance Little Sister"12
10. "Fool to Cry"
11. "Respectable"
12. "Miss You"
13. "Shattered"14
14. "Far Away Eyes"14
15. "Beast of Burden"
16. "Emotional Rescue"
17. "Dance (Pt. 1)" (Jagger/Richards/Ronnie Wood)15
18. "She's So Cold"15
19. "Waiting on a Friend"
20. "Neighbours"16

Disc four

1. "Start Me Up"
2. "Undercover of the Night"
3. "She Was Hot"
4. "Harlem Shuffle" (Nelson/Relf)
5. "Mixed Emotions"
6. "Highwire"
7. "Almost Hear You Sigh" (Jagger/Richards/Steve Jordan)19
8. "You Got Me Rocking"20
9. "Love Is Strong"
10. "I Go Wild"20
11. "Like a Rolling Stone" (Bob Dylan)S
12. "Anybody Seen My Baby?" (Jagger/Richards/k.d. lang/Mink)
13. "Saint of Me"21
14. "Don't Stop"
15. "Rough Justice"22
16. "Rain Fall Down"22
17. "Streets of Love"
18. "Plundered My Soul"EMS
19. "Doom and Gloom"
20. "One More Shot"

Bonus disc – IBC demos, 1963

1. "Diddley Daddy" (Ellas McDaniel/Harvey Fuqua)+
2. "Road Runner" (McDaniel)+
3. "Bright Lights, Big City" (Jimmy Reed)+
4. "Honey What's Wrong" (Reed) (aka "Baby, What's Wrong")+
5. "I Want to Be Loved" (Dixon)+

7-inch vinyl EP – BBC session, 1964

Side one

1. "Route 66" (Bobby Troup)1, 1A
2. "Cops and Robbers" (Kent Harris)+

Side two

1. "You Better Move On" (Arthur Alexander)RS
2. "Mona (I Need You Baby)" (McDaniel)1

== Personnel ==
- Mick Jagger (all tracks) – lead vocals, harmonica, guitars, keyboards, percussion
- Keith Richards (all tracks) – acoustic and electric guitars, vocals (lead vocals on "Happy", "You Got the Silver" and the first verse of "Salt of the Earth"), keyboards, bass guitar, percussion
- Charlie Watts (all tracks) – drums, percussion
- Brian Jones (1962–69) – guitars, harmonica, keyboards, percussion, backing vocals, sitar, mellotron, recorder, appalachian dulcimer, saxophone, marimba, xylophone, vibraphone, tambura, autoharp
- Bill Wyman (1962–91) – bass guitar, keyboards, backing vocals, percussion
- Mick Taylor (1969–74) – guitars, bass guitar, backing vocals
- Ronnie Wood (1975–present) – guitars, bass guitar, backing vocals

== Charts ==
=== Weekly charts ===
Weekly chart performance for GRRR!
Chart (2012)	Peak position
Argentine Albums (CAPIF)	10
Australian Albums (ARIA)	7
Austrian Albums (Ö3 Austria)	1
Belgian Albums (Ultratop Flanders)	4
Belgian Albums (Ultratop Wallonia)	6
Canadian Albums (Billboard)	18
Croatian International Albums (HDU)	1
Czech Albums (ČNS IFPI)	11
Danish Albums (Hitlisten)	7
Dutch Albums (Album Top 100)	4
Finnish Albums (Suomen virallinen lista)	29
French Albums (SNEP)	1
German Albums (Offizielle Top 100)	1
Greek Albums (IFPI)	3
Irish Albums (IRMA)	3
Italian Albums (FIMI)	6
Japanese Albums (Oricon)	12
Mexican Albums (Top 100 Mexico)	43
New Zealand Albums (RMNZ)	7
Norwegian Albums (VG-lista)	5
Polish Albums (ZPAV)	11
Portuguese Albums (AFP)	8
Scottish Albums (Official Charts)	4
Spanish Albums (Promusicae)	9
Swedish Albums (Sverigetopplistan)	9
Swiss Albums (Schweizer Hitparade)	6
UK Albums (Official Charts)	3
US Billboard 200	19
US Top Rock Albums (Billboard)	8

=== Year-end charts ===
2012 year-end chart performance for GRRR!
Chart (2012)	Position
Australian Albums (ARIA)	32
Austrian Albums (Ö3 Austria)	55
Belgian Albums (Ultratop Flanders)	64
Belgian Albums (Ultratop Wallonia)	50
Dutch Albums (Album Top 100)	23
German Albums (Offizielle Top 100)	27
Italian Albums (FIMI)	70
Swedish Albums (Sverigetopplistan)	65
UK Albums (OCC)	31

2013 year-end chart performance for GRRR!
Chart (2013)	Position
Belgian Albums (Ultratop Flanders)	80
Belgian Albums (Ultratop Wallonia)	83
Dutch Albums (Album Top 100)	91
French Albums (SNEP)	191
Spanish Albums (PROMUSICAE)	50
UK Albums (OCC)	95
US Billboard 200	139
US Top Rock Albums (Billboard)	38

== Certifications ==
Certifications for GRRR!
Region	Certification	Certified units/sales
Australia (ARIA)	2× Platinum	140,000^{^}
Austria (IFPI Austria)	Platinum	20,000^{*}
Belgium (BRMA)	Gold	15,000^{*}
Germany (BVMI)	Gold	100,000^{‡}
Ireland (IRMA)	Gold	7,500^{^}
Italy (FIMI)	Gold	30,000^{*}
New Zealand (RMNZ)	Gold	7,500^{^}
Poland (ZPAV)	2× Platinum	40,000^{*}
Spain (Promusicae)	Gold	20,000^{^}
United Kingdom (BPI)	Platinum	300,000^{*}
United States (RIAA)	Gold	500,000^{^}
Summaries
Worldwide (2012)	—	1,400,000
^{*} Sales figures based on certification alone.^{^} Shipments figures based on certification alone.^{‡} Sales+streaming figures based on certification alone.

== Release history ==
Release history and formats for GRRR!
Region	Date
Worldwide (excluding North America)	12 November 2012
North America	13 November 2012
