= You Got the Silver =

Song by the Rolling Stones

from the album Let It Bleed
- Released: 5 December 1969
- Recorded: 18 February 1969
- Genre: Blues; country blues; country-rock
- Length: 2:50
- Label: Decca/ABKCO
- Songwriter: Jagger–Richards
- Producer: Jimmy Miller

"You Got the Silver" is a song by the English rock and roll band the Rolling Stones from their 1969 album Let It Bleed. It was also released as the B-side to the "Let It Bleed" single in Japan.

== Recording ==
Recorded on 18 February 1969, "You Got the Silver" is the first Stones song to feature guitarist Keith Richards on solo lead vocal throughout. Richards previously sang separate lead vocals on parts of "Something Happened to Me Yesterday" from Between the Buttons and on "Salt of the Earth" from Beggars Banquet.

One of Richards' own compositions, "You Got the Silver" is said to have been written about his then-girlfriend Anita Pallenberg.

Hey babe, you got my soul, You got the silver, you got the gold
A flash of love has made me blind, I don't care, no, that's no big surprise

The band recorded a version of the song with Mick Jagger on lead but opted to use Richards' version for the official release. The Jagger version has since become a well-known bootleg recording.

"You Got the Silver" was the last Stones recording released with Brian Jones's participation, one of his two appearances on the album. He plays autoharp. Jones' autoharp contribution can only be heard clearly on the alternate mix with Jagger on vocals, and it is played only during the section of the verses where the drums join in. Bill Wyman's bass playing also stands out more in the unreleased alternate mix. The official/album mix has the autoharp mixed very low, though it can be heard in the right-hand channel between 1:04 and 1:25. The bootleg mix with Jagger on vocals places Jones's autoharp much more prominently in the mix. Nicky Hopkins' overdubbed organ and piano to the track and a backwards echo effect is applied to Richards' slide guitar track.

The story that the Jagger vocal was accidentally erased has been repeated by many since 1969, including engineer Glyn Johns in his autobiography Sound Man. The legend is that Richards recorded the vocal because Jagger was in Australia filming Ned Kelly. However, the high quality bootleg recordings of the Jagger vocal indicate that the Richards vocal was a deliberate choice. Jagger finished filming Ned Kelly in September. Final work on Let It Bleed continued into October and Jagger could have re-recorded the lost vocal at that time.

The song was played live for the first time during the No Security Tour in 1999. It was brought out again by Richards for the 2005-2007 A Bigger Bang Tour. A 1 November 2006 live performance captured on the 2008 concert film Shine a Light is featured on the album of the same name. The song was also played during the Rolling Stones' 50 and Counting tour, and a July 2013 performance appears on Hyde Park Live, featuring Ronnie Wood playing slide guitar. The song was played occasionally on the No Filter Tour as well as the Sixty tour and the Hackney Diamonds tour. During live performances, the song is notable for being sung by Richards without playing guitar or any other instrument.

"You Got the Silver" was featured in the Michelangelo Antonioni film Zabriskie Point. It can also be heard playing on the radio in a scene in Episode 2, Season 2 of the TV show "Dark Winds".

== Personnel ==
The Rolling Stones

- Keith Richards – vocals, acoustic, electric and slide guitars
- Brian Jones – autoharp
- Bill Wyman – bass guitar
- Charlie Watts – drums

Additional Personnel

- Nicky Hopkins – piano, organ

== Cover versions ==
The song was covered by blues singer Susan Tedeschi on her 2005 album, Hope and Desire and by neo-bluegrass group Crooked Still on its 2010 album, Some Strange Country.
