= 50 & Counting =

2012–13 concert tour by the Rolling Stones

- Tour by The Rolling Stones
- Location: Europe; North America
- Associated album: GRRR!
- Start date: 25 October 2012
- End date: 13 July 2013
- Legs: 4
- No. of shows: 30
- Box office: $148.9 million ($205.8 million in 2025 dollars)

The Rolling Stones concert chronology
- A Bigger Bang Tour (2005–07); 50 & Counting (2012–13); 14 On Fire (2014)

50 & Counting was a concert tour by the Rolling Stones to celebrate the 50th anniversary of the band, which started in October 2012 with two secret club gigs in Paris, and ended in July 2013 with two major shows at Hyde Park.

== History ==
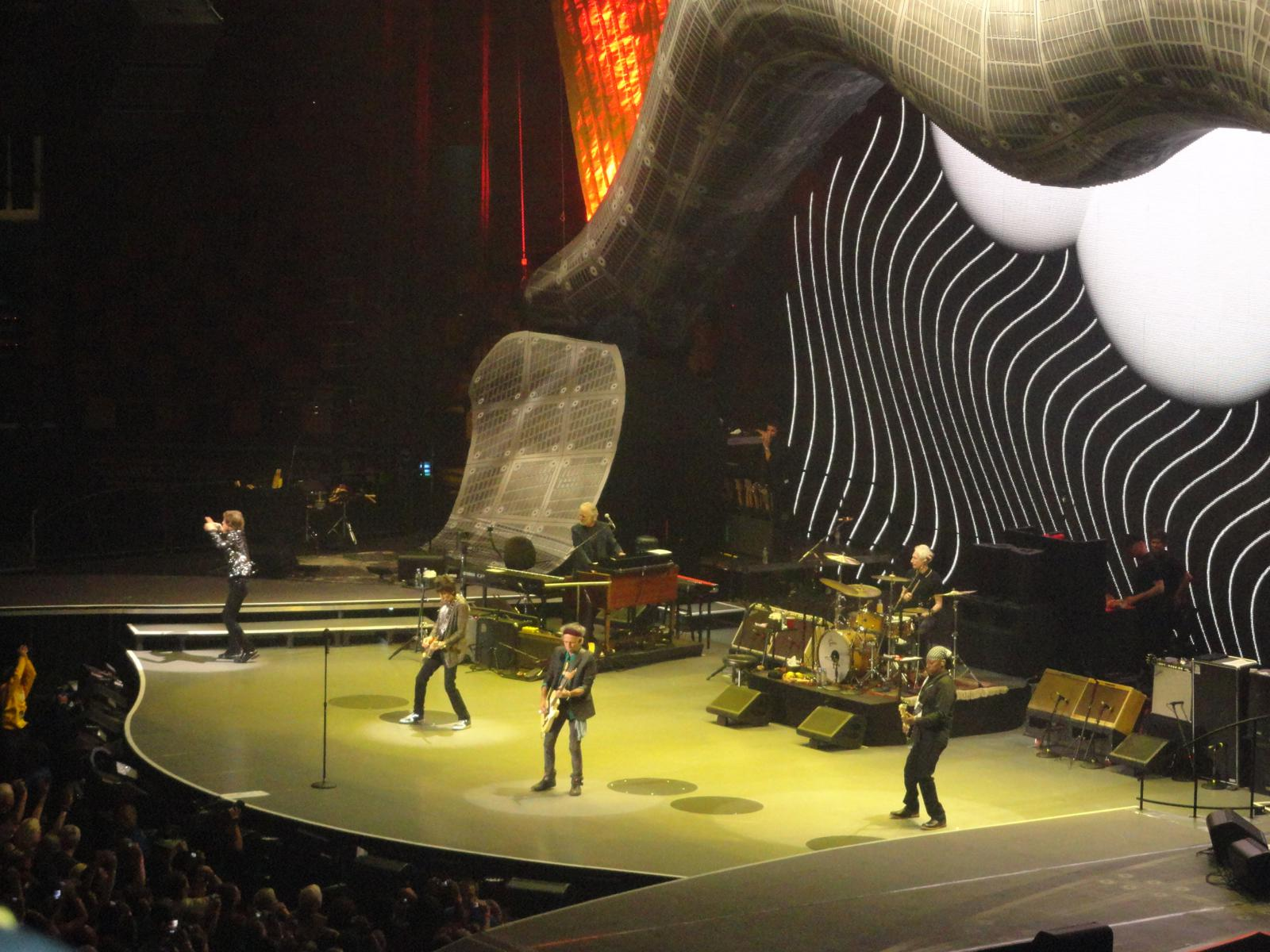
In Boston, Massachusetts on 12 June 2013- The Rolling Stones and support musicians from L-R in foreground: Jagger, Wood, Richards, and Jones- in the rear: Leavell (on keyboards), and Watts. Not visible: Mick Taylor, Wyman, horns and backing vocalists

=== 2012 preliminary rehearsals and recording sessions ===
In May 2012, the band met up at a studio in Weehawken, New Jersey for some secretive, preliminary rehearsals (their first time playing together since 2007).

On 19 May 2012, Mick Jagger hosted and performed on the season finale of Saturday Night Live. The Rolling Stones then made their first public appearance in over four years on 11 July 2012 at the Marquee Club in London and the following day at Somerset House to commemorate the 50th anniversary of their first ever concert. They also published a book entitled The Rolling Stones: 50 as well as a documentary, Crossfire Hurricane, released on 15 November 2012 on HBO. The documentary included interviews from all six of the living band members.

In August 2012, the Stones gathered at a studio in Paris to record their first new material since A Bigger Bang.

=== 2012 tour ===
In October and November 2012, the Rolling Stones conducted rehearsals for their 50th anniversary concerts. The rehearsals for the 2012 tour took place in Bondy near Paris (in a rehearsal studio named Planet Live) and in London at the Wembley Arena for the 2012 shows. On 12 November 2012, they released GRRR!, a greatest hits compilation album that included the two new songs from the August recording sessions: "Doom and Gloom" (previously released as a single on 11 October 2012) and "One More Shot".

On 15 October 2012, they announced their first shows: two at the O2 Arena in London on 25 & 29 November 2012, one at the Barclays Center in Brooklyn, New York on 8 December, and two at the Prudential Center in Newark, New Jersey on 13 & 15 December. The 15 December 2012 show was broadcast in pay-per-view in the United States and many other countries.

Guests were announced, including former members Bill Wyman and Mick Taylor at the two shows in London. At the first London show the band was joined by Mary J. Blige and Jeff Beck. For the second London show, Eric Clapton and Florence Welch appeared. The guests for the Brooklyn show were Mary J. Blige and Gary Clark, Jr. Mick Taylor appeared at both Newark shows. John Mayer performed at the first Newark show, while Bruce Springsteen, Lady Gaga and The Black Keys were the guests at the second night in Newark.

The Rolling Stones played two secret shows in Paris in October 2012. They also participated on 12 December 2012 in the 12-12-12: The Concert for Sandy Relief performing a brief set of "You Got Me Rocking" and "Jumpin' Jack Flash".

=== 2013 tour ===
On 3 April 2013, through their website, they announced more concerts as part of the 50 & Counting tour: a Spring 2013 North American tour of 18 arena concerts with the addition of a surprise club show at the Echoplex in Los Angeles, CA on 27 April 2013 where they were rehearsing. Prior to the announcement, the Associated Press compiled a list of five "reasons to care" about the pending tour by the "legendary band".

The rehearsals for the 2013 tour took place in Burbank, California, at Center Staging for the 2013 shows.

Katy Perry performed as guest star on May, 11 in Las Vegas, Carrie Underwood was guest on the 25 may concert in Toronto while Taylor Swift was guest on the 3 June concert in Chicago. After the last American concert on 24 June at the Verizon Center in Washington, D.C., the Stones returned to England to headline the Glastonbury Festival on 29 June, the band's first time ever participation in the festival.

On 6 and 13 July, they performed two shows at Hyde Park, 44 years after the 1969 performance and 51 years after their first ever gig (12 July 1962) at the Marquee Club then situated on Oxford Street, only a mile from the Hyde Park venue.

After the second Hyde Park concert, the band had a birthday celebration for Mick Jagger who turned 70 on 26 July 2013. The two Hyde Park shows were used for the live album Hyde Park Live as well as the concert film Sweet Summer Sun: Live in Hyde Park released 11 November 2013.

=== 2014 tour ===
On 3 December 2013, the Rolling Stones announced the 14 On Fire tour, a follow-up to the 50 & Counting tour, due to start in February 2014 and visit the Middle East and Asia, Europe in summer 2014, and Australia in later 2014.

== Set list ==
This set list is representative of the show on 3 May 2013. It does not represent all concerts for the duration of the tour.

1. "Get Off of My Cloud"
2. "The Last Time"
3. "It's Only Rock 'n Roll (But I Like It)"
4. "Paint It Black"
5. "Gimme Shelter"
6. "Wild Horses" (with Gwen Stefani)
7. "Factory Girl"
8. "Emotional Rescue"
9. "Respectable" (with Keith Urban)
10. "Doom and Gloom"
11. "One More Shot"
12. "Honky Tonk Women"
13. "Before They Make Me Run"
14. "Happy"
15. "Midnight Rambler"
16. "Miss You"
17. "Start Me Up"
18. "Tumbling Dice"
19. "Brown Sugar"
20. "Sympathy for the Devil"

Encore

1. "You Can't Always Get What You Want"
2. "Jumpin' Jack Flash"
3. "(I Can't Get No) Satisfaction"

== Tour dates ==
List of concerts, showing date, city, country, venue, tickets sold, number of available tickets and amount of gross revenue
Date	City	Country	Venue	Attendance	Revenue
Europe
25 October 2012	Paris	France	Le Trabendo	—N/a	—N/a
29 October 2012	Paris	France	Théâtre Mogador	—N/a	—N/a
25 November 2012	London	England	The O_{2} Arena	31,755 / 31,755	$17,100,700
29 November 2012	London	England	The O_{2} Arena	31,755 / 31,755	$17,100,700
North America
8 December 2012	Brooklyn	United States	Barclays Center	14,471 / 14,471	$7,297,560
12 December 2012 (Note: The 12 December 2012 concert in New York City is a part of the 12-12-12: The Concert for Sandy Relief.)	New York City	United States	Madison Square Garden	—N/a	—N/a
13 December 2012	Newark	United States	Prudential Center	27,476 / 27,476	$14,288,750
15 December 2012	Newark	United States	Prudential Center	27,476 / 27,476	$14,288,750
27 April 2013 (Note: The 27 April 2013 concert in Los Angeles is a surprise club show.)	Los Angeles	United States	Echoplex	—N/a	—N/a
3 May 2013	Los Angeles	United States	Staples Center	28,313 / 28,313	$9,933,548
5 May 2013	Oakland	United States	Oracle Arena	14,133 / 14,133	$5,068,993
8 May 2013	San Jose	United States	HP Pavilion at San Jose	12,803 / 12,803	$4,507,648
11 May 2013	Las Vegas	United States	MGM Grand Garden Arena	13,327 / 13,327	$6,119,172
15 May 2013	Anaheim	United States	Honda Center	26,579 / 26,579	$8,163,662
18 May 2013	Anaheim	United States	Honda Center	26,579 / 26,579	$8,163,662
20 May 2013	Los Angeles	United States	Staples Center	(Note: The score data is combined from the shows held at the Staples Center from 3 and 20 May 2013, respectively.)	
25 May 2013	Toronto	Canada	Air Canada Centre	31,149 / 31,149	$11,526,570
28 May 2013	Chicago	United States	United Center	43,763 / 43,763	$16,524,615
31 May 2013	Chicago	United States	United Center	43,763 / 43,763	$16,524,615
3 June 2013	Chicago	United States	United Center	43,763 / 43,763	$16,524,615
6 June 2013	Toronto	Canada	Air Canada Centre	(Note: The score data is combined from the shows held at the Air Canada Centre from 25 May – 6 June 2013, respectively.)	
9 June 2013	Montreal	Canada	Bell Centre	14,654 / 14,654	$4,299,296
12 June 2013	Boston	United States	TD Garden	24,277 / 24,277	$7,577,375
14 June 2013	Boston	United States	TD Garden	24,277 / 24,277	$7,577,375
18 June 2013	Philadelphia	United States	Wells Fargo Center	29,894 / 29,894	$9,245,276
21 June 2013	Philadelphia	United States	Wells Fargo Center	29,894 / 29,894	$9,245,276
24 June 2013	Washington, D.C.	United States	Verizon Center	14,404 / 14,404	$4,529,226
Europe
29 June 2013 (Note: The 29 June 2013 concert in Pilton is a part of the Glastonbury Festival 2013.)	Pilton	England	Worthy Farm	—N/a	—N/a
6 July 2013 (Note: The 6 July 2013 and 13 July 2013 concerts in London are part of the British Summer Time Festival.)	London	England	Hyde Park	130,000 / 130,000	$22,686,623
13 July 2013	London	England	Hyde Park	130,000 / 130,000	$22,686,623
Total				456,998 / 456,998	$148,869,014

== Personnel ==
The Rolling Stones

- Mick Jagger – lead vocals, guitar, harmonica, percussion, keyboards
- Keith Richards – guitars, vocals
- Charlie Watts – drums
- Ronnie Wood – guitars

Special guests

- Mick Taylor – guitars
- Bill Wyman – bass guitar

Additional musicians

- Bernard Fowler – backing vocals, percussion
- Lisa Fischer – backing vocals, percussion
- Darryl Jones – bass guitar, backing vocals
- Bobby Keys – saxophone
- Chuck Leavell – keyboards, backing vocals, percussion
- Tim Ries – saxophone, keyboards
- Matt Clifford- French horn, introduction voice

== Boxscore ==
- Top 100 North American Mid Year Tours 2013: #1
- Total Gross: US$87.7 million
- Total Attendance: 253,296
- No. of concerts: 18

== See also ==
- The Rolling Stones concerts
