= Hyde Park Live =

2013 live album and concert film by The Rolling Stones

Live album by the Rolling Stones
- Released: 22 July 2013
- Recorded: 6 and 13 July 2013
- Venue: Hyde Park, London
- Genre: Rock
- Length: 111:29
- Label: Promotone BV

The Rolling Stones chronology
GRRR! (2012)	Hyde Park Live (2013)	Live 1965: Music from Charlie Is My Darling (2014)

Professional ratings
Review scores
Source	Rating
AllMusic	3/5 stars
Consequence of Sound	4/5 stars

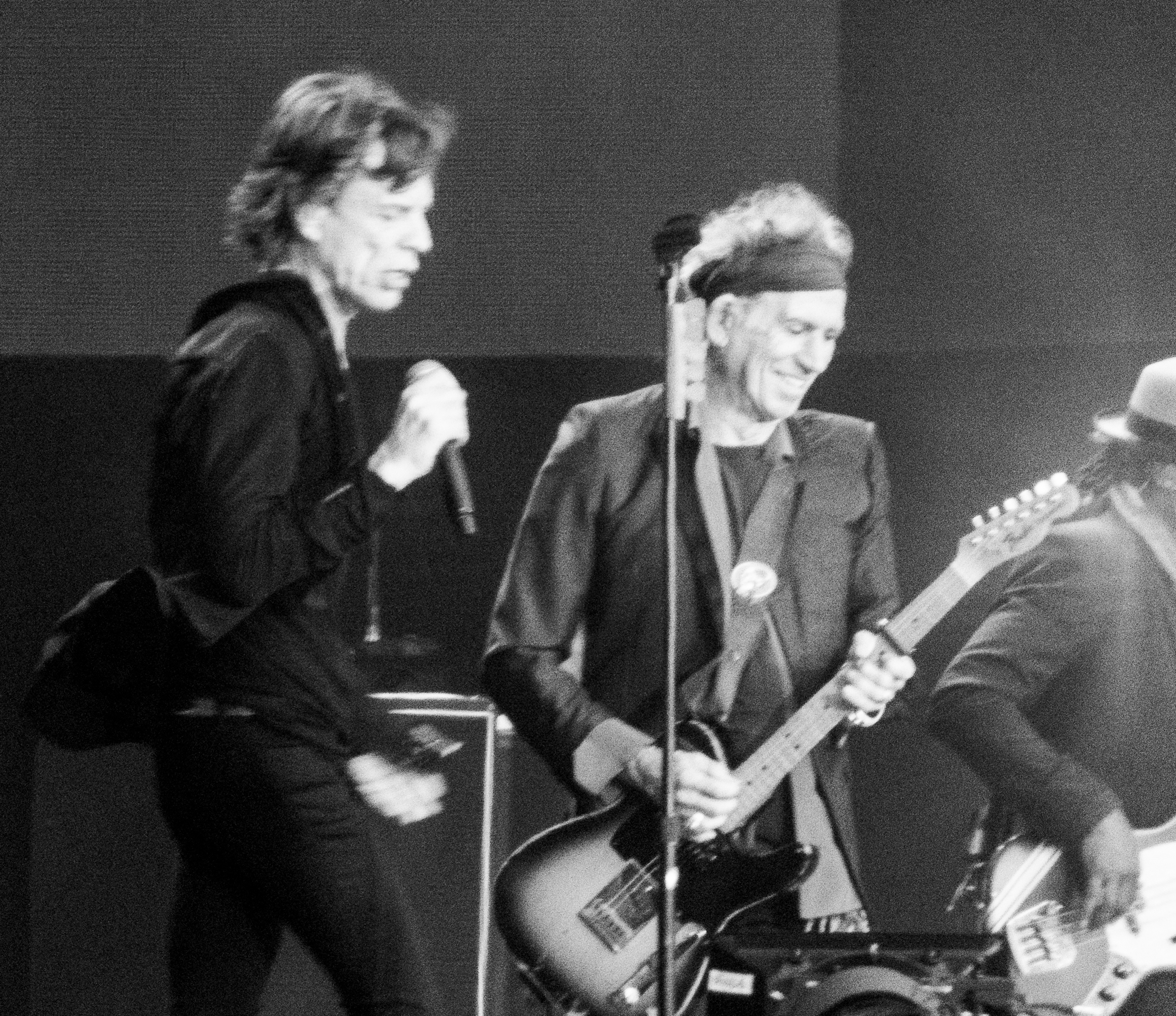
Jagger and Richards performing at Hyde Park on 6 July 2013

Hyde Park Live is a live album by the Rolling Stones, released in 2013. It was recorded at Hyde Park, London on 6 and 13 July 2013 during the band's 50 & Counting Tour. The album was released exclusively as a digital download through iTunes on 22 July 2013 for a limited time of four weeks. The album debuted at No. 16 in the UK and No. 19 in the US. The same concert was later issued on DVD as Sweet Summer Sun: Live in Hyde Park.

== Background ==
In 1969, the Rolling Stones performed a free concert in Hyde Park just two days after the death of founding member Brian Jones, with the gig also serving as the introduction to new guitarist Mick Taylor. As part of the 50 & Counting tour that celebrated the Rolling Stones' 50th anniversary celebrations, a new Hyde Park concert was scheduled in 2013, supported by the Vaccines, the Temper Trap, and Gary Clark Jr. The 65,000 tickets sold out in three minutes. Taylor, who left the band in 1974, appears on two tracks: "Midnight Rambler" and show closer "(I Can't Get No) Satisfaction".

== Track listing ==
All tracks are written by Mick Jagger and Keith Richards.

Hyde Park Live track listing
No.	Title	Length
1.	"Start Me Up"	4:18
2.	"It's Only Rock 'n Roll (But I Like It)"	4:46
3.	"Tumbling Dice"	4:05
4.	"Emotional Rescue"	5:53
5.	"Street Fighting Man"	5:22
6.	"Ruby Tuesday"	3:21
7.	"Doom and Gloom"	4:17
8.	"Paint It Black"	5:01
9.	"Honky Tonk Women"	6:58
10.	"You Got the Silver"	3:18
11.	"Before They Make Me Run"	4:33
12.	"Miss You"	7:18
13.	"Midnight Rambler"	11:54
14.	"Gimme Shelter"	7:16
15.	"Jumpin' Jack Flash"	4:53
16.	"Sympathy for the Devil"	6:46
17.	"Brown Sugar"	4:55
18.	"You Can't Always Get What You Want"	8:04
19.	"(I Can't Get No) Satisfaction"	8:20
Total length:		111:29

== Sweet Summer Sun: Hyde Park Live ==
Sweet Summer Sun: Hyde Park Live
- Directed by: Paul Dugdale
- Produced by: Jim Parsons
- Starring: The Rolling Stones
- Distributed by: Eagle Rock Entertainment
- Release date: 11 November 2013
- Running time: 121 minutes

A video recording of the concert, Sweet Summer Sun – Hyde Park Live, was issued on 11 November 2013 on DVD and Blu-ray, along with CDs and LPs.

=== Track listing ===
All tracks are written by Mick Jagger and Keith Richards.

DVD & Blu-ray
No.	Title	Length
1.	"Start Me Up"
2.	"It's Only Rock 'n Roll (But I Like It)"
3.	"Street Fighting Man"
4.	"Ruby Tuesday"
5.	"Doom and Gloom"
6.	"Honky Tonk Women"
7.	"You Got the Silver"
8.	"Happy"
9.	"Miss You"
10.	"Midnight Rambler"
11.	"Gimme Shelter"
12.	"Jumpin' Jack Flash"
13.	"Sympathy for the Devil"
14.	"Brown Sugar"
15.	"You Can't Always Get What You Want"
16.	"(I Can't Get No) Satisfaction"

Bonus tracks on DVD & Blu-ray
No.	Title	Length
17.	"Emotional Rescue"
18.	"Paint It Black"
19.	"Before They Make Me Run"

CD – Disc 1
No.	Title	Length
1.	"Start Me Up"	4:18
2.	"It's Only Rock 'n Roll (But I Like It)"	4:46
3.	"Tumbling Dice"	4:05
4.	"Emotional Rescue"	5:53
5.	"Street Fighting Man"	5:22
6.	"Ruby Tuesday"	3:21
7.	"Doom and Gloom"	4:17
8.	"Paint It Black"	5:01
9.	"Honky Tonk Women"	6:58
10.	"You Got the Silver"	3:18
11.	"Before They Make Me Run"	4:33

CD – Disc 2
No.	Title	Length
12.	"Miss You"	7:18
13.	"Midnight Rambler"	11:54
14.	"Gimme Shelter"	7:16
15.	"Jumpin' Jack Flash"	4:53
16.	"Sympathy for the Devil"	6:46
17.	"Brown Sugar"	4:55
18.	"You Can't Always Get What You Want"	8:04
19.	"(I Can't Get No) Satisfaction"	8:20

== Personnel ==
The Rolling Stones

- Mick Jagger – lead vocals, guitar, harmonica
- Keith Richards – guitars, lead vocals in "You Got the Silver", "Before They Make Me Run" and "Happy"
- Ronnie Wood – guitars
- Charlie Watts – drums
- Mick Taylor – slide guitar on "Midnight Rambler", acoustic guitar and backing vocals on "(I Can't Get No) Satisfaction"

Additional personnel

- Darryl Jones – bass, backing vocals
- Chuck Leavell – keyboards, backing vocals, cowbell on "Honky Tonk Women"
- Bernard Fowler – backing vocals, percussion
- Lisa Fischer – backing vocals, percussion
- Bobby Keys – saxophone
- Tim Ries – saxophone, keyboards
- Matt Clifford – French horn on "You Can't Always Get What You Want"
- Voce Chamber Choir – choir on "You Can't Always Get What You Want"
- London Youth Choir – choir on "You Can't Always Get What You Want"

== Charts ==
=== Weekly charts ===
Weekly chart performance for Hyde Park Live
Chart (2013)	Peak position
Australian Albums (ARIA)	37
Austrian Albums (Ö3 Austria)	23
Belgian Albums (Ultratop Flanders)	4
Belgian Albums (Ultratop Wallonia)	12
Canadian Albums (Billboard)	20
Danish Albums (Hitlisten)	9
Dutch Albums (Album Top 100)	1
French Albums (SNEP)	23
Irish Albums (IRMA)	41
Italian Albums (FIMI)	13
Norwegian Albums (VG-lista)	2
Scottish Albums (Official Charts)	23
UK Albums (Official Charts)	16
US Billboard 200	19
US Top Rock Albums (Billboard)	4

=== Year-end charts ===
Year-end chart performance for Hyde Park Live
Chart (2013)	Position
Belgian Albums (Ultratop Flanders)	115
Belgian Albums (Ultratop Wallonia)	133

== Certifications ==
Certifications for Hyde Park Live
Region	Certification	Certified units/sales
Australia (ARIA)	Platinum	15,000^{^}
^{^} Shipments figures based on certification alone.
