= Longchamp Racecourse =

Horse racing venue

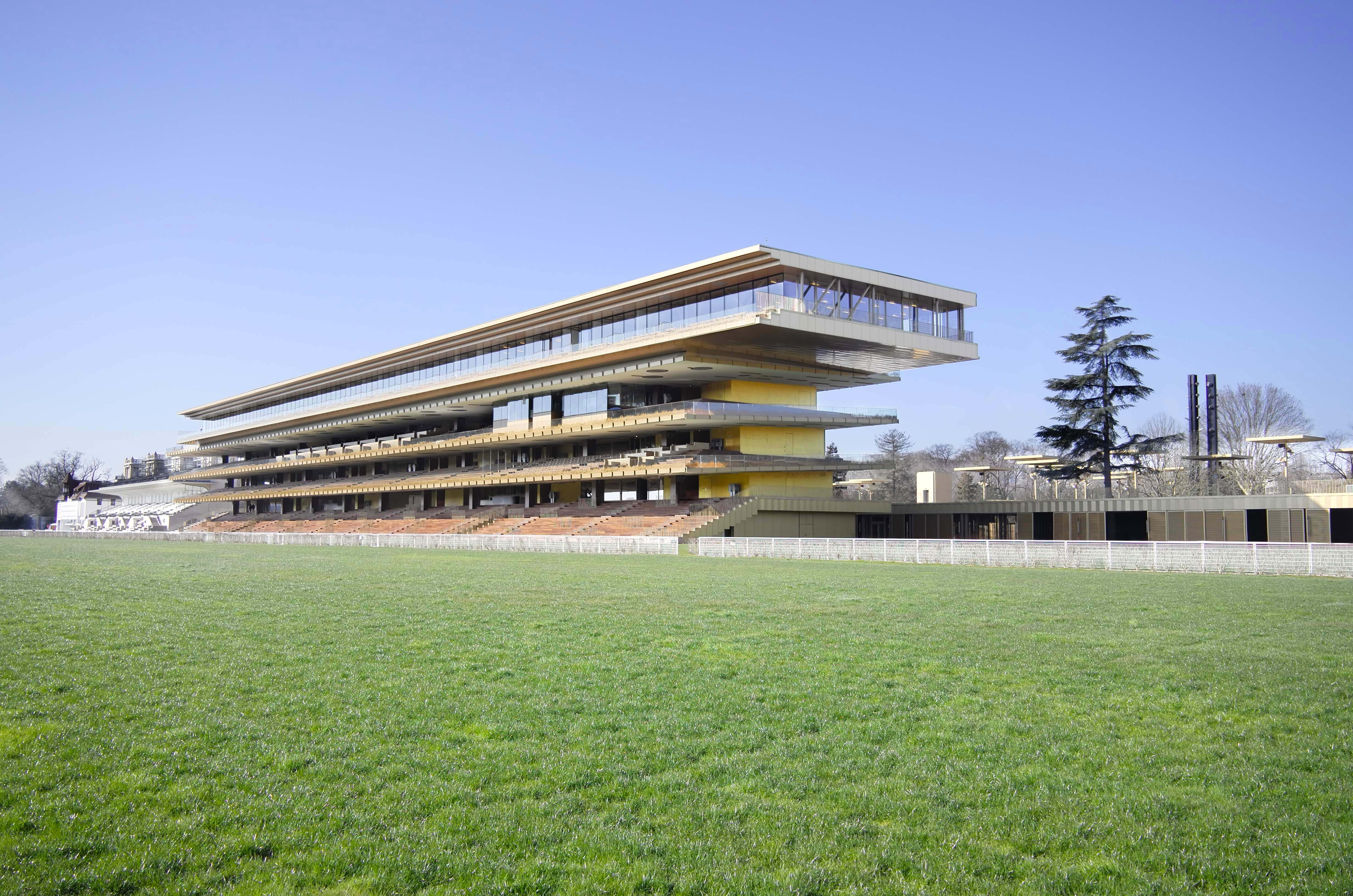
- Location: 2 Route des Tribunes, 75016 Paris
- Coordinates: 48.8587832°N 2.2296328°E
- Owned by: France Galop
- Date opened: 1857
- Capacity: 50,000
- Course type: Flat
- Notable races: Prix de l'Arc de Triomphe

The Longchamp Racecourse (French: Hippodrome de Longchamp, pronounced [ipɔdʁom də lɔ̃ʃɑ̃]) is a 57-hectare (140-acre) horse-racing facility located on the Route des Tribunes at the Bois de Boulogne in the 16th arrondissement of Paris, France. It is used for flat racing and is noted for its variety of interlaced tracks and a famous hill that provides a real challenge to competing thoroughbreds. It has several racetracks varying from 1,000 to 4,000 metres in length, with 46 different starting posts.

The course is home to more than half of the group one races held in France, and it has a capacity of 50,000. The highlight of the calendar is the Prix de l'Arc de Triomphe. Held on the first weekend in October, the event attracts the best horses from around the world.

The leather fashion goods company Longchamp got its name from the facility.

== History ==
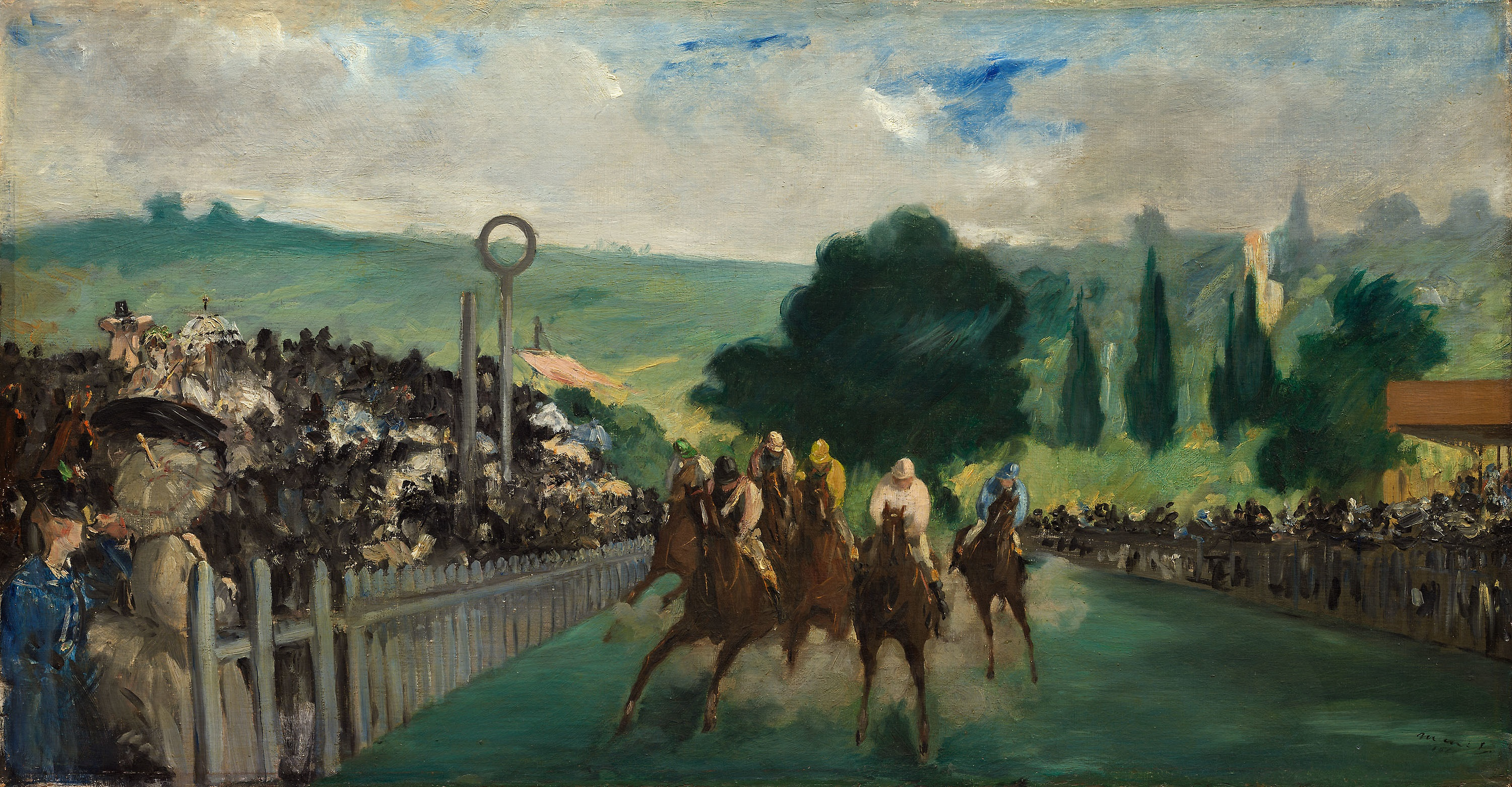
Races at Longchamp – Édouard Manet, 1866

The first race run at Longchamp was on Sunday 27 April 1857, in front of a massive crowd. The Emperor Napoleon III and his wife Eugénie were present, having sailed down the Seine River on their private yacht to watch the third race. Until 1930, many Parisians came to the track down the river on steamboats and various other vessels, the trip taking around an hour to the Pont de Suresnes. The royal couple joined Prince Jérôme Bonaparte and his son Prince Napoleon in the Royal Enclosure alongside the Prince of Nassau, Prince Murat and the Duke of Morny, an avid racegoer. Non-aristocratic members of the upper classes were not permitted into the Royal Enclosure and had to be content with watching from their barouche carriages on the lawn.

A number of prominent artists have painted horse racing scenes at Longchamp, including the one seen here by Édouard Manet in 1867, and another four years later by Edgar Degas titled Race Horses at Longchamp.

Racing continued during World War II.

== Events venue ==
Longchamp hosts the annual Solidays music festival, which takes place in late June, as well as the Lollapalooza Paris festival, which occurs annually in mid-July.

The Rolling Stones performed at Longchamp on 30 June and 1 July 1995 during their Voodoo Lounge Tour, and they played again on 23 July 2022 as part of their Sixty Europe Tour.

== Layout ==
Plan of the Longchamp Racecourse
