= 19th Nervous Breakdown =

- West German picture sleeve

Single by the Rolling Stones
- B-side: "As Tears Go By" (UK); "Sad Day" (US)
- Released: 4 February 1966
- Recorded: 3–8 December 1965
- Studio: RCA (Hollywood, California)
- Genre: Rock
- Length: 3:56
- Label: Decca (UK); London (US)
- Songwriter: Jagger–Richards
- Producer: Andrew Loog Oldham

Rolling Stones UK singles chronology
"Get Off of My Cloud" (1965)	"19th Nervous Breakdown" (1966)	"Paint It Black" (1966)

Rolling Stones US singles chronology
"As Tears Go By" (1965)	"19th Nervous Breakdown" (1966)	"Paint It Black" (1966)

Audio sample
- file; help

Alternative cover
- US picture sleeve

"19th Nervous Breakdown" is a song recorded by the English rock band the Rolling Stones. Written by Mick Jagger and Keith Richards, it was recorded in late 1965 and released as a single in February 1966. It reached number 2 on US Billboard Hot 100 and Britain's Record Retailer chart (subsequently the UK Singles Chart), while topping the charts compiled by US Cash Box and both UK NME and Melody Maker.

== Composition and recording ==
The song was written during the group's October–December 1965 tour of the United States and recorded at the conclusion of their fourth North American tour during the Aftermath album sessions, between 3 and 8 December 1965 at RCA Recording Studios in Hollywood, California.

Jagger came up with the title first and then wrote the lyrics around it. The opening guitar figure is played by Keith Richards while in the verses Brian Jones plays a bass-note figure that derives from "Diddley Daddy" by Bo Diddley, a major influence on the Rolling Stones' style. Here the riff is extended into a long blues chord progression behind lyrics similar to those of their previous UK single, "Get Off of My Cloud", and the verse alternates with a bridge theme. The track is also known for Bill Wyman's "dive-bombing" bass line at the end. At almost four minutes' duration, it is long by the standards of the time.

Cash Box described the single as a "pulsating, hard-driving fast-moving bluesy affair about a sensitive gal who lets her guy get him down". Record World called the lyrics "intriguing".

== Personnel ==
According to authors Philippe Margotin and Jean-Michel Guesdon, except where noted:

The Rolling Stones

- Mick Jagger – vocals
- Keith Richards – backing vocals, lead guitar, fuzz guitar
- Brian Jones – rhythm guitar
- Bill Wyman – bass
- Charlie Watts – drums

Additional musician

- Ian Stewart – piano

== Release ==
"19th Nervous Breakdown" was released as a single on 4 February 1966 in the UK and on 12 February 1966 in the US. Like many early Rolling Stones recordings, "19th Nervous Breakdown" has been officially released only in mono sound. A stereo mix of the song has turned up in private and bootleg collections. An alternate version features a radically different vocal from Jagger, who alternates between mellow on the verses and rawer on the chorus. The Stones performed "19th Nervous Breakdown" live on The Ed Sullivan Show on 11 September.

"19th Nervous Breakdown" has further appeared on numerous Stones compilations, including Hot Rocks 1964–1971 (1971), Singles Collection: The London Years (1989), Forty Licks (2002), and GRRR! (2012).

== Commercial performance ==
In the UK, "19th Nervous Breakdown" reached number 2 on the Record Retailer chart. The single topped the NME Top 30 chart for three weeks in addition to the BBC's Pick of the Pops charts. The single was the fifth best-selling single of 1966 in the UK, achieving greater full-year sales than both Nancy Sinatra's "These Boots Are Made for Walkin'" and the Stones' own "Paint It Black".

In the US, "19th Nervous Breakdown" peaked at number 2 on the Billboard Hot 100 for three weeks, behind "The Ballad of the Green Berets" by SSgt Barry Sadler, and number 1 on the Cash Box Top 100.

== Other versions ==
- In June 1966, just four months after the Rolling Stones released their single, American garage rock band The Standells covered the song for their album Dirty Water.
- In 2010, English indie rock group The Wedding Present covered the song for the first season of The A.V. Club's A.V. Undercover web series.

== Charts ==
Chart (1966)	Peak position
Canada (RPM Mag.)	9
Finland (Soumen Virallinen)	5
Germany (GfK)	1
Ireland (IRMA)	2
New Zealand (Listener)	2
Norway (VG-lista)	2
South Africa (Springbok)	2
Sweden (Kvällstoppen)	5
Sweden (Tio i Topp)	4
UK Record Retailer	2
UK NME	1
UK Melody Maker Pop 50	1
US Billboard Hot 100	2
US Billboard R&B Singles Chart	32
US Cash Box Top 100	1
