= Voce Chamber Choir =

- Origin: (United Kingdom) London, England
- Genres: Choral music
- Occupation: Choir
- Years active: 2003–Present
- Website: http://www.vocechamberchoir.org.uk

Voce is a London-based chamber choir founded in 2003 by Harry Briggs and Suzi Digby OBE.

== Description and history ==
Based in central London, the choir is made up of around thirty singers and covers a wide-ranging and challenging repertoire of primarily a cappella music. Past concerts have featured European sacred music, Arabic music, gospel, jazz and even a programme alternating European renaissance music with traditional African chant.

The choir has performed with several distinguished guest conductors including Ralph Allwood, Mike Brewer, Ken Burton and Tim Sutton.

In July 2010, Voce performed a programme which revived music from the Montagu Music Collection at Boughton House, including an anthem composed by Giovanni Bononcini for the Duke of Marlborough which had not been performed since the 18th Century. The programme also featured a new commission from composer Mike Brewer entitled 'Amore Vittorioso', sponsored by the BBC Performing Arts Fund.

In March 2009, Voce performed the London premiere of Peter Maxwell Davies’ setting of the poem ‘The Five Acts of Harry Patch’, by poet laureate Andrew Motion, accompanied by the London Mozart Players.

In May 2007 Voce performed alongside Willard White at the memorial service of Frank Johnson.

The choir's self-titled debut album of European choral works, recorded at Queens' College, Cambridge, was released in November 2010.

In 2012–2013, Voce performed with the Rolling Stones at their UK shows in London at the O2 arena (November 2012), Glastonbury (June 2013) and Hyde Park (July 2013).

Voce Chamber Choir goes on tour once a year. Voce has performed in Lisbon, Berlin, Stockholm, Vilnius and Medellin and Munich. Most recently the choir performed in 2025 Cork and Bath.
