= Paint It Black =

1966 song by the Rolling Stones

- French picture sleeve

Single by the Rolling Stones

from the album Aftermath (US release)
- B-side: "Stupid Girl" (US); "Long, Long While" (UK)
- Released: 13 May 1966
- Recorded: 6–9 March 1966
- Studio: RCA (Hollywood, California)
- Genre: Raga rock; psychedelia; psychedelic rock
- Length: 3:46
- Label: Decca (UK); London (US)
- Songwriter: Jagger–Richards
- Producer: Andrew Loog Oldham

Rolling Stones US singles chronology
"19th Nervous Breakdown" (1966)	"Paint It Black" (1966)	"Mother's Little Helper" (1966)

Rolling Stones UK singles chronology
"19th Nervous Breakdown" (1966)	"Paint It Black" (1966)	"Have You Seen Your Mother, Baby, Standing in the Shadow?" (1966)

Lyric video
- "Paint It Black" (lyric video) on YouTube

Alternative cover
- US picture sleeve

"Paint It Black" (Note: The song was originally released as "Paint It, Black" due to a typographical error.) is a song by the English rock band the Rolling Stones. A product of the songwriting partnership of Mick Jagger and Keith Richards, it is a raga rock song with Indian, Middle Eastern, and Eastern European influences and lyrics about grief and loss. London Records released the song as a single in May 1966 in the United States, and Decca Records in the United Kingdom. Two months later, London Records included it as the opening track on the American version of the band's 1966 studio album Aftermath, though it is not on the original UK release.

Originating from a series of improvisational melodies played by Brian Jones on the sitar, the song features all five members of the band contributing to the final arrangement although only Jagger and Richards were credited as songwriters. In contrast to previous Rolling Stones singles with straightforward rock arrangements, "Paint It Black" has unconventional instrumentation, including a prominent sitar, a Hammond organ, and castanets. This instrumental experimentation matches other songs on Aftermath. The song was influential to the burgeoning psychedelic genre as the first chart-topping single to feature the sitar, and widened the instrument's audience. Reviews of the song at the time were mixed, and some music critics believed its use of the sitar was an attempt to copy the Beatles, while others criticised its experimental style and doubted its commercial potential.

"Paint It Black" was a major chart success for the Rolling Stones, remaining 11 weeks (including two at number one) on the US Billboard Hot 100, and 10 weeks (including one atop the chart) on the Record Retailer chart in the UK. Upon a reissue in 2007, it reentered the UK Singles Chart for 11 weeks. It was the band's third number-one single in the US and sixth in the UK. The song also topped charts in Canada and the Netherlands. It received 2× platinum certification in the UK from the British Phonographic Industry (BPI) and platinum from Italy's Federazione Industria Musicale Italiana (FIMI).

"Paint It Black" was inducted into the Grammy Hall of Fame in 2018, and Rolling Stone magazine ranked the song number 213 on their list of the 500 Greatest Songs of All Time. In 2011, the song was added to the Rock and Roll Hall of Fame's list of "The Songs that Shaped Rock and Roll". Many artists have covered "Paint It Black" since its initial release. It has been included on many of the band's compilation albums and several film soundtracks. It has been played on a number of Rolling Stones tours.

== Background ==
In 1965, popularity of the Rolling Stones increased markedly with a series of international hit singles written by lead singer Mick Jagger and guitarist Keith Richards. This success attracted the attention of Allen Klein, an American businessman who became their US representative in August while Andrew Loog Oldham, the group's manager, continued in the role of promoter and record producer. One of Klein's first actions on the band's behalf was to force Decca Records to grant a $1.2 million royalty advance to the group, bringing the members their first signs of financial wealth and allowing them to purchase country houses and new cars. Their October–December 1965 tour of North America was the group's fourth and largest tour there up to that point. According to the biographer Victor Bockris, through Klein's involvement, the concerts afforded the band "more publicity, more protection and higher fees than ever before."

By this time, the Rolling Stones had begun to respond to the increasingly sophisticated music of the Beatles, in comparison to whom they had long been promoted by Oldham as a rougher alternative. With the success of the Jagger–Richards-penned singles "(I Can't Get No) Satisfaction" (1965), "Get Off of My Cloud" (1965) and "19th Nervous Breakdown" (1966), the band increasingly rivalled the musical and cultural influence of the Beatles, and began to be identified as one of the major pillars of the British Invasion. The Stones' outspoken, surly attitude on songs like "Satisfaction" alienated the Establishment detractors of rock music, which music historian Colin King explains, "only made the group more appealing to those sons and daughters who found themselves estranged from the hypocrisies of the adult world – an element that would solidify into an increasingly militant and disenchanted counterculture as the decade wore on."

== Development ==
"Paint It Black" came at a pivotal period in the band's recording history. The Jagger–Richards songwriting collaboration had begun producing more original material for the band over the past year, with the early model of Stones albums featuring only a few Jagger–Richards compositions having been replaced by that of albums such as Out of Our Heads and December's Children (and Everybody's), each of which consisted of half original tracks and half cover songs. This trend culminated in the sessions for Aftermath (1966) where, for the first time, the duo penned every track on the album. Brian Jones, originally the band's founder and leader over the first few years of its existence, began feeling overshadowed by the prominence of Jagger and Richards' contributions to the group.

Despite having contributed to early songs by the Stones via the Nanker Phelge pseudonym, Jones had less and less influence over the group's direction as their popularity grew primarily as a result of original Jagger–Richards singles. Jones grew bored attempting to write songs with conventional guitar melodies. To alleviate his boredom, he began exploring Eastern instruments, specifically the Indian sitar, with a goal to bolstering the musical texture and complexity of the band's sound. A multi-instrumentalist, Jones could develop a tune on the sitar in a short time; he had a background with the instrument largely from his studies under Harihar Rao, a disciple of Ravi Shankar.

Over 1965, the sitar had become a more and more prominent instrument in the landscape of British rock. The Yardbirds had attempted to record "Heart Full of Soul" with the sitar as part of the arrangement in April; however, they had run into problems getting the instrument to "cut through" the mix, and the session musician responsible for playing the instrument had trouble staying within the 4/4 time signature of the song. Ultimately, the final version of "Heart Full of Soul" featured a fuzz guitar in place of the sitar, although the song's distinctively Indian timbre remained. Following similar Indian-influenced experimentation by the Kinks on "See My Friends" that nonetheless still used guitar as the primary instrument, the first British band to release a recording featuring the sitar was the Beatles, with "Norwegian Wood (This Bird Has Flown)" released that December on the album Rubber Soul. Following a discussion with the Beatles' lead guitarist George Harrison, who had recently played the sitar on the sessions for "Norwegian Wood" in October 1965, Jones began devoting more time to the sitar, and began arranging basic melodies with the instrument. One of these melodies morphed over time into the tune featured in "Paint It Black".

== Writing and recording ==
Jagger and Richards wrote the lyrics and much of the chord progression of "Paint It Black" the previous December during the first sessions for the then untitled album Aftermath, and while on the 1966 Australian tour. Initially, the first group of sessions were to be released as an album by themselves, then titled Could You Walk on the Water? In mid-January 1966, the British press announced that a new Rolling Stones LP carrying that title would be released on 10 March. In Rolling with the Stones, Wyman refers to the announcement as "audacity" on Oldham's part. A Decca spokesman said the company would not issue an album with such a title "at any price"; Oldham's idea upset executives at the company's American distributor, London Records, who feared the allusion to Jesus walking on water would provoke a negative response from Christians.

The title controversy embroiled the Stones in a conflict with Decca, delaying the Stones' next studio album's release from March to April 1966. The delay, however, gave the Stones more time to record new material for the upcoming album, which had now been retitled Aftermath. Upon their return from Australasia, it was one of the new songs worked on for the revised new album. "Paint It Black" was recorded as the Stones had begun to take more time recording their material. Referring to the atmosphere of the Stones' sessions at the time, Richards told Beat Instrumental magazine in February 1966: "Our previous sessions have always been rush jobs. This time we were able to relax a little, take our time." Sound engineer Dave Hassinger recorded the song on 6 and 9 March 1966 at RCA Studios in Los Angeles. Andrew Loog Oldham produced the track, as with all of the Stones' recordings until 1967. Both the single's US and UK B-sides were also recorded on these dates, as were a majority of album tracks for Aftermath.

"Paint It Black" follows a simple verse form that lacks a refrain. It starts with five consecutive 16-bar verses before relaxing into a chanted section and finishing in a frantic coda. The song was written originally as a standard pop arrangement in a minor key similar to "The House of the Rising Sun", which Jagger humorously compared to "songs for Jewish weddings". The Stones were dissatisfied with this version and considered scrapping the song altogether. During a session break, Bill Wyman twiddled with a Hammond organ in search of a heavier bass sound; Wyman's playing inspired the uptempo and Eastern melody. The sitar was brought into the mix when Harihar Rao walked into the studio with one in hand. With the sitar, Jones combined his recent melodic improvisations with the chord progression and lyrics provided by Jagger and Richards. Soon after the recording session, Richards felt that the track's conclusion was over-recorded and that it could have been improved.

This song may have the first recorded example of a fretless bass guitar. Wyman had removed the frets from a bass intending to replace them, but became enamoured with the fretless sound. This can be most easily heard near the end of each vocal line, when Wyman plays high on the bass's neck, using the upper register.

Wyman was later critical of Oldham listing Jagger and Richards as songwriters to the exclusion of the rest of the Stones. He felt that "Paint It Black" should have been credited to the band's pseudonym, Nanker Phelge, rather than Jagger–Richards, since the song's final arrangement originated from a studio improvisation by Jones, Watts and himself, and Jones was responsible for providing the melody line on the sitar. In the view of pop historian Andrew Grant Jackson, "Paint It Black" bears a strong resemblance to the Supremes' 1965 hit "My World Is Empty Without You", which used "a foreboding minor key with harpsichord and organ".

== Music and lyrics ==
"Paint It Black"
Featuring a sitar line, "Paint It Black" is an uptempo Indian song that describes the grief suffered by one stunned by the sudden and unexpected loss of a partner.

In a 1995 interview, commenting on the musical styles found on Aftermath, Jagger described "Paint It Black" as "this kind of Turkish song". According to music scholar James E. Perone, although the introductory sitar passage is played in an Indian fashion, "the rhythmic and melodic feel of the Eastern-sounding phrases actually call to mind the Middle East more than India". Jagger's droning and slightly nasal singing complement the motif Jones plays on the sitar. Wyman's heavy bass, Charlie Watts' low-pitch drumming and Richards' bolero-driven acoustic guitar outro drive "Paint It Black". Commentators and reviewers have classified "Paint It Black" as raga rock, psychedelia, and psychedelic rock. Perone named "Paint It Black" as one of the Stones' 1966 songs that acts as an explicit attempt to transcend the blues-based rock and roll conventions of the Stones' previous songs, along with other Aftermath songs such as "Stupid Girl", "Lady Jane" and "Under My Thumb".

Using colour-based metaphors, the song's lyrics describe the grief suffered by someone stunned by the sudden and unexpected loss of a partner, leading to what author Tony Visconti terms "a blanket worldview of desperation and desolation, with no hint of hope." The lyrics have also given rise to alternative interpretations scholars consider less likely, ranging from a bad trip on hallucinogens to the Vietnam War. Perone noted in 2012 that the lyrical content – a character "so entrenched in his depression and rage that he has lost all hope" – establishes a rough concept for Aftermath's American edition, the following songs offering insight into "the darkness of his psyche" and possible reasons for its darkness. Perone argues the resulting connections among the songs on Aftermath lend it a conceptual unity which, although not sufficient for it to be considered a concept album, allows for the record to be understood "as a psychodrama around the theme of love, desire and obsession that never quite turns out right". As Perone explains:

The individual songs seem to ping-pong back and forth between themes of love/desire for women and the desire to control women and out-and-out misogyny. However, the band uses musical connections between songs as well as the sub-theme of travel, the use of feline metaphors for women and other lyrical connections to suggest that the characters whom lead singer Mick Jagger portrays throughout the album are really one and perhaps stem from the deep recesses of his psyche.

The Village Voice music critic Robert Christgau described "Paint It Black" as an example of the Stones' development as artists. According to Christgau, the texture of the Stones' blues-derived hard rock is "permanently enriched" as Jones "daub[s] on occult instrumental [colours]". Christgau praised Mick Jagger specifically for his influence on the Stones' artistic identity on their 1966 material, describing him as a lyricist "whose power, subtlety and wit are unparalleled in contemporary popular music", and additionally suggested that Jagger and Richards rank second as composers of melody in rock, behind only John Lennon and Paul McCartney.

== Release ==
London Records released "Paint It Black" as a single in the US in May 1966; Decca Records released it on 13 May in the UK. "Paint It Black"'s UK B-side was "Long Long While", a song that was not released on any of the band's studio albums. Richie Unterberger of AllMusic later described "Long Long While" as an underappreciated song, with a "considerably different" tone than most of the band's work, and commented that it was better than many of the tracks the Stones selected for their studio albums. Upon their original release, the songs were credited to "Jagger-Richard", as Andrew Loog Oldham advised Keith Richards to use the surname Richard professionally on the Stones' releases during the 1960s. Later releases of the song have changed the credit to "Jagger-Richards".

In the US, "Stupid Girl" was chosen as its US B-side. Both songs were included in the American release of Aftermath, with "Paint It Black" being a new addition when compared to the earlier British edition "Paint It Black" became Aftermath's opening track, replacing "Mother's Little Helper", while "Stupid Girl" remained as the second track on the album. Its delayed North American release allowed pirate radio stations to play the single up to two weeks before the album appeared. The song was originally released as "Paint It, Black", the comma being an error by Decca, which stirred controversy over its racial interpretation. The Stones performed "Paint It Black" live on The Ed Sullivan Show on 11 September.

Due to "Paint It Black" not appearing on the UK edition of Aftermath and being released as a non-album single, its first album release in the UK came on the UK edition of the compilation Big Hits (High Tide and Green Grass) (1966), though the album was not released with the song as part of its track listing in the US. The first release of the song on a compilation album in the US came on Through the Past, Darkly (Big Hits Vol. 2) (1969).

Later compilations by the Rolling Stones featuring "Paint It Black" include Hot Rocks 1964–1971 (1971), Singles Collection: The London Years (1989), Forty Licks (2002), and GRRR! (2012). Live recordings are on the concert albums Flashpoint (1991), Live Licks (2004), Shine a Light (2008), Hyde Park Live (2013), and Havana Moon (2016).

== Critical reception and legacy ==
Initial reaction to "Paint It Black" was mixed. Some music critics found the addition of the sitar to be simply a case of the band copying the Beatles. In his book Brian Jones: The Making of the Rolling Stones, Paul Trynka comments on the influence of Harrison's sitar playing on the Beatles' song "Norwegian Wood" from the Rubber Soul album and draws parallels with Jones' droning sitar melody on "Paint It Black". Responding to claims that he was imitating the Beatles, Jones replied: "What utter rubbish", comparing the argument to saying that all groups using a guitar copy each other merely by using the instrument. Jonathan Bellman, an American musicologist, agreed with Jones, writing in a 1997 issue of The Journal of Musicology that the events are an example of concurrent musical and instrumental experimentation. Jones' sitar part on the track influenced the development of a whole subgenre of minor-key psychedelic music.

Lindy Shannon of the La Crosse Tribune felt that "Paint It Black", the Byrds' "Eight Miles High" and the Beatles' "Rain" were straying from the "commercial field" and instead "going into a sort of distorted area of unpleasant sounds". Staff at Melody Maker lauded the track, calling it "a glorious Indian raga-riot that will send the Stones back to number one". Writing for Disc and Music Echo, Penny Valentine praised Jagger's singing, writing that it was "better than ever" but was critical of the track's sitar. Guitar Player's Jesse Gress cited "Paint It Black" as originating the 1960s ragarock craze. In a review for New Musical Express (NME), Keith Altham considered "Paint It Black" the band's best single since "(I Can't Get No) Satisfaction" was released the previous year. A reviewer for Billboard predicted that Aftermath would become another hit for the band, citing "Paint It Black" as the focal point of this hard rock album and praising Oldham's production. Record World said "Guys are in depressed mood, but the rhythm is anything but depressed. Irrepressible hit." The Herald News considered the song a "top record ... for teeners", and in The Sunday Press Nancy Brown described it as a "pulsating, blues-soaked romantic tear-jerker". In the San Francisco Examiner, Ralph J. Gleason lauded the song for its "hypnotizing tone" and "same qualities of ambiguity and obscurity as some of the previous Stones hits". In April 1967, while hosting the television documentary Inside Pop: The Rock Revolution, Leonard Bernstein praised the song for its "Arab café" sound, and cited it as an example of contemporary pop music's ability to evoke disparate moods through instrumentation.

In a retrospective review, Richie Unterberger of AllMusic called the song an "eerily insistent" classic that features some of "the best use of sitar on a rock record", and in another AllMusic review wrote it is "perhaps the most effective use of the Indian instrument in a rock song". Writing on the song's 50th anniversary in 2016, Dave Swanson of Ultimate Classic Rock considered the song, like its parent album Aftermath, to be a major turning point in artistic evolution for the band, noting: "'Paint It, Black' wasn't just another song by just another rock group; it was an explosion of ideas presented in one neat three-minute package." In 2017, ranking Aftermath as one of the best albums of the 1960s, Judy Berman of Pitchfork described the song as "rock's most nihilistic hit to date". David Palmer, editor of the Cullman Times, wrote that the "attitude" songs on Aftermath – particularly "Paint It Black" – influenced the nihilistic outlook of punk music. Stereogum critic Tom Breihan praised the song as a strong example of the band's brand of "swirling doom-blues", and praised its heavy sound and dark lyrics as ahead of its time when compared to the landscape of popular music in 1966.

"Paint It Black" inspired almost four hundred covers. It has placed on many "best songs" lists including those by Rolling Stone, Vulture, NME, and Pitchfork. The Recording Academy inducted the song into the Grammy Hall of Fame in 2018. It is ranked number 213 on Rolling Stone's list of the 500 Greatest Songs of All Time.

== Commercial performance ==
In the UK, "Paint It Black" peaked at number one on the Record Retailer chart during a 10-week stay, becoming the Rolling Stones' sixth UK number one. Seven days after its UK release, "Paint It Black" had sold 300,000 advance copies; the British Phonographic Industry (BPI) later certified it 2× platinum. In 2007, the song entered the UK Singles chart at number 70 for an 11-week stint. In Germany, "Paint It Black" peaked at number two on the Musikmarkt Hit-Parade; the Bundesverband Musikindustrie (BVMI) certified the 2018 re-issue platinum. The single was a top five hit in other European countries, peaking at number two in Austria, Ireland and Norway; number three in Belgium; and number four in Spain. After its 1990 reissue, "Paint It Black" charted at number 61. The single's 2007 reissue charted at number 49 on the Official German Charts and its 2012 re-issue charted number at 127 in France.

"Paint It Black" debuted at number 48 on the US Billboard Hot 100 chart for the week of 14 May 1966. The song took three weeks to rise to number one, where it stayed for two consecutive weeks, being replaced by Frank Sinatra's "Strangers in the Night". Its stint at number one made it the band's third in the US and the first song to feature a sitar to peak at number one in the country. By June, it had sold more than a million copies. It rose to number one in a "violent shakeup" of the list where 10 of its 20 songs appeared for the first time. "Paint It Black" remained on the chart for 11 weeks. Further reissues of the single have not peaked on the Billboard Hot 100, but 2008 sales saw "Paint It Black" reach number 73 on the Billboard Hot Canadian Digital Song Sales. According to the pop historian Richard Havers, Aftermath's 1966 chart run in the US, where it reached number 2 on the Billboard chart and number 1 on those published by Cash Box and Record World, was assisted by the success of "Paint It Black". "Paint It Black" also topped singles charts in Canada and the Netherlands, and was ranked within the Top 10 highest performing singles of the year in Austria, despite not reaching number 1 on the weekly charts.

In a KEYS national survey taken in June 1966, "Paint It Black" was number one in the United States. Surveys conducted by the Associated Press and United Press International identified the song as ranking No. 1 in the US the week of 12–19 June 1966. On the 1966 year-end charts, "Paint It Black" ranked number 34 on the US Billboard Hot 100 and number 30 on the Record Retailer chart. The 1990 reissue of "Paint It Black" topped the Netherlands Single Top 100 and peaked at number 11 in Belgium.

== Live performances ==
The Rolling Stones performed "Paint It Black" during their tours of America and England in 1966, following its release, along with other songs from Aftermath such as "Under My Thumb" and "Lady Jane", One notable live performance of the song was as the opening song of the Stones' performance at the Royal Albert Hall, a performance remembered for ending prematurely due to a riot, which led to rock bands being banned from performing at the venue. Footage of the riot would later be used in the promotional video for the Stones' next single, "Have You Seen Your Mother, Baby, Standing in the Shadow?". Despite its status as a hit single and as a staple of these shows, "Paint It Black" was not included on the Stones' live album documenting their tour of England, Got Live If You Want It!.

"Paint It Black" has become a regular fixture of the Stones' concert setlists following its release, and has been performed during the Steel Wheels/Urban Jungle Tour (1991), Licks Tour (2002–2003), A Bigger Bang Tour (2005–2007), 50 & Counting (2012–2013), 14 On Fire (2014), América Latina Olé Tour 2016, No Filter Tour (2017–2021) and Sixty tour (2022).

== Personnel ==
According to authors Andy Babiuk and Greg Prevost, except where noted:

The Rolling Stones

- Mick Jagger – lead and harmony vocals; writer
- Keith Richards – harmony vocal; electric and acoustic guitars; writer
- Brian Jones – sitar, acoustic guitar
- Bill Wyman – bass, Hammond organ (pedals), maracas, cowbell
- Charlie Watts – drums, tambourine, castanets

Additional musicians and production

- Jack Nitzsche – piano
- Dave Hassinger – sound engineer
- Andrew Loog Oldham – producer

In Philippe Margotin and Jean-Michel Guesdon's book The Rolling Stones All the Songs, they add a question mark after Jones' guitar contribution and credit "tambourine, bongos, castanets" to "unidentified musicians". In the book Rolling Stones Gear by Babiuk and Prevost, they credit an acoustic guitar contribution to Jones, maracas and cowbell to Wyman and tambourine and castanets to Watts.

Studio locations

- Recorded at RCA Studios (Los Angeles)

== Charts ==
=== Weekly charts ===
1966 weekly chart performance for "Paint It Black"
Chart (1966)	Peak position
Austria (Ö3 Austria Top 40)	2
Belgium (Ultratop 50 Flanders)	3
Belgium (Ultratop 50 Wallonia)	8
Canada Top Singles (RPM)	1
Finland (Suomen Virallinen)	3
Ireland (IRMA)	2
Israel	1
Malaysia (RIM)	1
Netherlands (Dutch Top 40)	1
Netherlands (Single Top 100)	1
New Zealand (Listener)	4
Norway (VG-lista)	2
Sweden (Kvällstoppen)	2
Sweden (Tio i Topp)	2
Spain (AFE)	4
UK (Melody Maker)	1
UK (New Musical Express)	1
UK (Record Retailer)	1
UK (Disc & Music Echo)	2
US Billboard Hot 100	1
US Cash Box Top 100	1
US Record World Top 100	1
West Germany (Musikmarkt Hit-Parade)	2

1990 weekly chart performance for "Paint It Black"
Chart (1990)	Peak position
Belgium (Ultratop 50 Flanders)	11
Europe (Eurochart Hot 100)	52
Netherlands (Dutch Top 40)	1
Netherlands (Single Top 100)	1
UK Singles (Official Charts)	61

2007 weekly chart performance for "Paint It Black"
Chart (2007)	Peak position
Germany (GfK)	49
UK Singles (Official Charts)	70

2012 weekly chart performance for "Paint It Black"
Chart (2012)	Peak position
France (SNEP)	127

2022 weekly chart performance for "Paint It Black"
Chart (2022)	Peak position
Hungary (Single Top 40)	29

=== Year-end charts ===
1966 year-end chart performance for "Paint It Black"
Chart (1966)	Position
Austria (Ö3 Austria Top 40)	10
Belgium (Ultratop Flanders)	31
Netherlands (Dutch Top 40)	14
UK Record Retailer	30
US Billboard Hot 100	34
US Cash Box Top 100	32

1990 year-end chart performance for "Paint It Black"
Chart (1990)	Position
Netherlands (Dutch Top 40)	14
Netherlands (Single Top 100)	10

== Certifications ==
Certifications for "Paint It Black"
Region	Certification	Certified units/sales
Australia (ARIA)	5× Platinum	350,000^{‡}
Denmark (IFPI Danmark)	Platinum	90,000^{‡}
Germany (BVMI)	Platinum	600,000^{‡}
Italy (FIMI)	Platinum	50,000^{‡}
New Zealand (RMNZ)	4× Platinum	120,000^{‡}
Spain (Promusicae)	2× Platinum	120,000^{‡}
United Kingdom (BPI)	2× Platinum	1,200,000^{‡}
^{‡} Sales+streaming figures based on certification alone.

== Notable cover versions ==
- Eric Burdon and War released a cover of the song in 1970, which reached number 31 on the Dutch Top 40 singles chart.
- Bahamian musician Exuma included a cover of the song on his 1973 album Life.
- English all-female post-punk band the Mo-dettes released their version in 1980 which just missed the UK top 40, peaking at No. 42.
- Canadian speed metal band Anvil recorded a cover for their 1981 debut album Hard 'n' Heavy.
- Irish rock band U2 included a cover of "Paint It Black" as the B-side to their 1992 single "Who's Gonna Ride Your Wild Horses", and did so again with the 20th anniversary rerelease of their album Achtung Baby in 2011.
- The London Symphony Orchestra performed a cover of the song in their 1994 "Symphonic Music of the Rolling Stones" performance.
- American singer Tracy Lawrence covered "Paint It Black" for the compilation album Stone Country: Country Artists Perform the Songs of the Rolling Stones in 1997.
- American singer-songwriter Vanessa Carlton included a cover of the song on her 2002 debut album Be Not Nobody, which was certified platinum by the Recording Industry Association of America.
- Canadian rock band Rush played one minute and ten seconds of the song during their 2003 performance at Molson Canadian Rocks for Toronto.
- American singer-songwriter Ciara recorded a cover version for the 2015 film The Last Witch Hunter.
- English band Duran Duran recorded a cover for their 2023 album Danse Macabre.
- Irish rockers U2 have incorporated it into their performance of Until The End Of The World at their Las Vegas residency at The Sphere.

=== Foreign language covers ===
In addition to cover versions in English, with the same lyrics, there have been several notable versions in other languages. In most cases the lyrics have been loosely on the same theme: black (and red) and the loss of a lover. One case, the French Marie Douceur - Marie Colère (Mary Sweetness - Marie Anger), has a completely different text; formally, it is a contrafactum. These versions in other languages include:

- A 1966 Italian version by Caterina Caselli (lyrics by Luciano Beretta) titled Tutto Nero (All Black), later also covered by Gli Avvoltoi on the album Il nostro è solo un mondo beat (1988). In this version, the world is already all black, due to a woman having lost her man, rather than a man wanting to paint the world black (presumably due to having lost his woman).
- In 1966 Marie Laforêt recorded a French version titled Marie Douceur - Marie Colère (Mary Sweetness - Marie Anger), lyrics by Michel Jourdan, released on the 1967 album Manchester et Liverpool. This was itself later covered by Tyler Bates and Manon Hollander in the 2023 film John Wick: Chapter 4. The lyrics describe the two faces of a woman, Mary: her sweet side and her angry side.
- A 1969 German version by Karel Gott titled Rot und Schwarz (Red and Black), on the album In mir klingt ein Lied. The lyrics describe love as red and its absence as black, and hopes that their love will rise again. The German name is the same as that of the French book The Red and the Black (1830).
- A 1994 Serbian turbo-folk version by Dragan Kojić Keba titled U crno obojeno (Painted in Black) on his album Sve ću tuge poneti sa sobom. The brief lyrics state that everything inside the singer is painted black.

== Notable usage in media ==
"Paint It Black" has seen commercial use in film, video games and other entertainment media.

- In the end credits of the film Full Metal Jacket (1987)
- In the end credits of the film The Devil's Advocate (1997)
- It was used as a plot device in the supernatural horror film Stir of Echoes (1999)
- It was featured in Black Adam (2022), during a slow motion fight sequence.
- In 1987 it was used as opening theme for the broadcast version of the CBS television show, Tour of Duty.
- In a trailer for the video game Call of Duty: Black Ops III (2015)
- In a trailer for the film The Mummy (2017).
- In the end credits of "Kate", episode four of East of Eden (2026)
- Multiple episodes of the TV series Westworld use an orchestral arrangement of the song by Ramin Djawadi.
- A cello arrangement of the song is featured prominently in the episode 3 of the 1st season of Netflix original series Wednesday (2022).
- The song features on the soundtracks to several video games, including:
  - Twisted Metal: Black (2001),
  - Conflict: Vietnam (2004),
  - Guitar Hero III: Legends of Rock (2007)
  - Guitar Hero Live (2015)
  - Mafia III (2016) appearing both on the game's licensed in-game radio soundtrack and on its collector's edition vinyl album.

== Bibliography ==
- Anon. (1 January 2001). "The Sixties". The Daily Telegraph. Archived from the original on 27 November 2018.
- Babiuk, Andy; Prevost, Greg (2013). Rolling Stones Gear: All the Stones Instruments from Stage to Studio. Milwaukee: Backbeat Books. ISBN 9781617130922.
- Bockris, Victor (1992). Keith Richards: The Unauthorised Biography. London: Hutchinson. ISBN 0091743974.
- Bonanno, Massimo (1990). The Rolling Stones Chronicle: The First Thirty Years. London: Plexus. ISBN 9780859651356.
- Brend, Mark (2005). Strange Sounds: Offbeat Instruments and Sonic Experiments in Pop. San Francisco, CA: Backbeat Books. ISBN 9780879308551. Archived from the original on 6 January 2021.
- Bronson, Fred (2003). The Billboard Book of Number One Hits. Billboard Books. ISBN 9780823076772. Archived from the original on 6 January 2021.
- Charone, Barbara (1979). Keith Richards. London: Futura Publications. ISBN 9780708816585.
- Coelho, Victor; Covach, John (2019). The Cambridge Companion to the Rolling Stones. Cambridge: Cambridge University Press. ISBN 9781107030268. Archived from the original on 6 January 2021.
- Dalton, David (1981). "Rolling Stones": The First Twenty Years. London: Thames & Hudson. ISBN 9780500272619.
- Davis, Stephen (2001). Old Gods Almost Dead: The 40-Year Odyssey of the Rolling Stones. Crown/Archetype. ISBN 0767909569.
- DeRogatis, Jim (2003). Turn On Your Mind: Four Decades of Great Psychedelic Rock. Milwaukee, WI: Hal Leonard LLC. ISBN 9780634055485.
- Erlewine, Stephen Thomas (n.d.). "The Rolling Stones". AllMusic. Archived from the original on 13 June 2018.
- Greenfield, Robert (1981). The Rolling Stone Interviews. New York: St. Martin's Press/Rolling Stone Press. ISBN 9780312689551.
- Jackson, Andrew Grant (2015). 1965: The Most Revolutionary Year in Music. New York: Macmillan Publishers. ISBN 9781250059628. Archived from the original on 15 August 2021.
- Janovitz, Bill (2013). Rocks Off: 50 Tracks That Tell the Story of The Rolling Stones. New York: St. Martin's Press. ISBN 9781250026316. Archived from the original on 6 January 2021.
- King, Colin (2004). Rock On!: The Rock 'n' Roll Greats. Caxton. ISBN 1840674733.
- Kubernik, Harvey (2006). Hollywood Shack Job: Rock Music in Film and on Your Screen. Albuquerque, New Mexico: University of New Mexico Press. ISBN 9780826335425.
- Margotin, Philippe; Guesdon, Jean-Michel (2016). The Rolling Stones All the Songs: The Story Behind Every Track. Philadelphia, PA: Running Press. ISBN 9780316317733. Archived from the original on 6 January 2021.
- Norman, Philip (2001). The Stones. London: Sidgwick & Jackson. ISBN 0283072776.
- Norman, Philip (2012). Mick Jagger. Doubleday Canada. ISBN 9780385669061.
- Perone, James E. (2012). The Album: A Guide to Pop Music's Most Provocative, Influential and Important Creations. Santa Barbara, CA: Praeger. ISBN 9780313379062.
- Philo, Simon (2015). British Invasion: The Crosscurrents of Musical Influence. Lanham, MD: Rowman & Littlefield. ISBN 9780810886278.
- Rice, Jo (1982). The Guinness Book of 500 Number One Hits (1st ed.). Enfield, Middlesex: Guinness World Records. ISBN 9780851122502.
- Schaffner, Nicholas (1982). The British Invasion: From the First Wave to the New Wave. New York: McGraw Hill Education. ISBN 9780070550896.
- Simonelli, David (2013). Working Class Heroes: Rock Music and British Society in the 1960s and 1970s. Lanham, MD: Lexington Books. ISBN 9780739170519.
- Trynka, Paul (2015). Brian Jones: The Making of the Rolling Stones. New York: Plume. ISBN 9780147516459.
- Visconti, Tony (2014). 1,001 Songs You Must Hear Before You Die (4th ed.). New York: Universe Publishing. ISBN 9780789320896. Archived from the original on 31 October 2012.
- Williams, Richard (10 October 2002). "The loudest thing we'd ever heard". The Guardian.
- Wyman, Bill (2002). Rolling with the Stones. London: Dorling Kindersley. ISBN 9780751346466.
