= You Can't Always Get What You Want =

- UK picture sleeve (reverse)

Single by the Rolling Stones

from the album Let It Bleed
- A-side: "Honky Tonk Women"
- Released: 4 July 1969 (single version); December 1969 (extended album version)
- Recorded: 16–17 November 1968
- Studio: Olympic, London
- Genre: Rock; pop; gospel
- Length: 5:00 (single); 7:28 (album)
- Label: Decca (UK); London (US)
- Songwriter: Jagger–Richards
- Producer: Jimmy Miller

The Rolling Stones UK singles chronology
"Jumpin' Jack Flash" (1968)	"Honky Tonk Women" / "You Can't Always Get What You Want" (1969)	"Brown Sugar" (1971)

The Rolling Stones US singles chronology
"Street Fighting Man" (1968)	"Honky Tonk Women" / "You Can't Always Get What You Want" (1969)	"Brown Sugar" (1971)

Official audio
- "You Can't Always Get What You Want" on YouTube

"You Can't Always Get What You Want" is a song by the English rock band the Rolling Stones from their 1969 album Let It Bleed. Written by Mick Jagger and Keith Richards, it was named as the 100th greatest song of all time by Rolling Stone magazine in its 2004 list of the "500 Greatest Songs of All Time" before dropping a place the following year.

== Composition and recording ==
Jagger commented on the song's beginnings:

"You Can't Always Get What You Want" was something I just played on the acoustic guitar—one of those bedroom songs. It proved to be quite difficult to record because Charlie couldn't play the groove and so Jimmy Miller had to play the drums. I'd also had this idea of having a choir, probably a gospel choir, on the track, but there wasn't one around at that point. Jack Nitzsche, or somebody, said that we could get the London Bach Choir and we said, "That will be a laugh.".

"You Can't Always Get What You Want" was composed in the key of C major and was the first song recorded for the album. It exists in two versions, a 4:51 single mix and a 7:28 album mix. "You Can't Always Get What You Want" was recorded on 16 and 17 November 1968 at Olympic Sound Studios in London. It features the London Bach Choir opening the song (the choir opening is only on the album version), highlighting throughout, and bringing it to its conclusion. Al Kooper plays piano and organ, as well as the French horn intro, while Rocky Dijon plays congas, maracas and tambourine.

The structure of the song is as follows:

- Verse 1: choir
- Chorus-call/Chorus-response: choir
- Break (1 mm. in 2/4 + 8 mm. in 4/4): acoustic guitar + French horn/percussion.
- Verse 2: acoustic guitar + Jagger
- Chorus-call: shaker/Chorus-response: stop time, piano, organ
- Break (4 mm.): full band instrumental
- Verse 3: electric guitar
- Chorus-call: soul vocal group/Chorus-response: stop time, piano, organ
- Break (4 mm.): instrumental, Jagger screams
- Verse 4a: organ, bass/Verse 4b: el. guitar, piano, conga//additional verse
- Chorus-call: soul vocal group/Chorus-response: stop time, piano, organ
- Break (2 mm.): full band, Jagger screams
- Bridge (5 mm.): ascending choir line, el. guitar solo
- Verse with no lyrics: choir//instrumental part
- Chorus-call (no lyrics): choir/Chorus-response: choir, soul vocal group (“you get what you need”)
- Break (4mm.): full band, Jagger screams
- Verse 5: el. guitar
- Chorus-call: soul vocal group/Chorus-response: soul vocal group
- Break (4mm.): full band + choir
- Chorus-response [additional]: full band + choir/Chorus-response: ditto
- Outro (28 mm.): choir ascending line, piano frolics, double time, handclapping

In his retrospective review of the song, Richie Unterberger of AllMusic said: "If you buy John Lennon's observation that the Rolling Stones were apt to copy the Beatles' innovations within a few months or so, 'You Can't Always Get What You Want' is the Rolling Stones' counterpart to 'Hey Jude'." Jagger said in 1969, "I liked the way the Beatles did that with 'Hey Jude'. The orchestra was not just to cover everything up—it was something extra. We may do something like that on the next album."

The use of the classical choir makes a stylistic contrast with blues-rock music. The contrast is enhanced as choir performs with British accent (Received Pronunciation), while Jagger imitates Southern American English, which is typical for his singing style.

== Lyrics ==
The three verses (and the varied theme of the fourth verse) address major topics of the 1960s: love, politics, and drugs. Each verse captures the essence of the initial optimism and eventual disillusion, followed by the resigned pragmatism of the chorus.

Unterberger elaborated:

Much has been made of the lyrics reflecting the end of the overlong party that was the 1960s, as a snapshot of Swinging London burning out. That's a valid interpretation, but it should also be pointed out that there's also an uplifting and reassuring quality to the melody and performance. This is particularly true of the key lyrical hook, when we are reminded that we can't always get what we want, but we'll get what we need.

Jimmy Hutmaker of Excelsior, Minnesota, claimed to be the "Mr. Jimmy" cited in the song and that he said the phrase "you can't always get what you want" to Jagger during a chance encounter at an Excelsior drug store in 1964. However, David Dalton, a writer for Rolling Stone who witnessed the filming of The Rolling Stones Rock and Roll Circus, claims in his commentary for the DVD of the concert that "Mr. Jimmy" refers to Miller, the Stones producer from 1968 to 1973.

Marianne Faithfull has also claimed a role: "Obviously I also contributed to 'You Can't Always Get What You Want' and 'Dear Doctor' – junk songs ... I know they used me as a muse for those tough drug songs. I knew I was being used but it was for a worthy cause."

== Release and use ==
The song was originally released on the B-side of "Honky Tonk Women" in July 1969. Although it did not chart at the time, London Records re-serviced the single in 1973 and "You Can't Always Get What You Want" reached number 42 on the Billboard Hot 100 and number 34 on the Cashbox Top 100 Singles chart. One of the Stones' most popular recordings, it has since appeared on the compilations Hot Rocks, Singles Collection (single version), Forty Licks, Rolled Gold+: The Very Best of the Rolling Stones (2007 edition), Singles 1968-1971 (single version), Slow Rollers (single version) and GRRR! (single version).

Live recordings appear on the albums Love You Live, Flashpoint, Live Licks, Brussels Affair, Hyde Park Live, and Havana Moon, as well as on The Rolling Stones Rock and Roll Circus, filmed in 1968. Stones concert films that contain the song include: Ladies and Gentlemen: The Rolling Stones, From the Vault – L.A Forum - Live in 1975, Let's Spend the Night Together, Stones at the Max, Bridges to Babylon Tour '97–98, Four Flicks, The Biggest Bang, Sweet Summer Sun: Hyde Park Live, and Havana Moon.

The song was performed live with members of Voce Chamber Choir and London Youth Choir for the Stones' 2012 shows in London, November 25 and November 29. The same choir also performed on the track at Glastonbury and two performances at Hyde Park in 2013.

The song was played during the opening scenes of the 1983 film The Big Chill.

The first episode of the series Californication opens with the song.

In 2026, English singer Sam Fender covered the song for the John Lewis Christmas Advert.

=== Trump campaign use ===
Donald Trump played the Rolling Stones' recording of the song at campaign appearances during the 2016 Republican primaries and the presidential election, including his nationally televised acceptance speech at the Republican National Convention in July. Although the campaign had attained a blanket licence from ASCAP, after the convention, the band said publicly that they do not endorse Trump and requested that he cease all use of their songs immediately. Despite the requests to stop, Trump continued using the song at campaign rallies before and after the 2016 election. According to Jagger, the band considers the use of the song as a play-out at rallies to be "odd", given that it is a "sort of doomy ballad about drugs in Chelsea". The Trump campaign continued to use the song during 2020, and after it was played to close his political rally in Tulsa, Oklahoma, on June 20, 2020, Trump was again warned by the Stones not to use their music. They said they were working with the performing rights organisation, BMI to prevent unauthorised use. The Trump campaign stopped using the song soon after and began playing "Y.M.C.A." by Village People to end his rallies instead.

As of 2025, the Trump administration has been playing both songs at political events.

== Personnel ==
=== Studio version ===
The Rolling Stones

- Mick Jagger – lead vocals
- Keith Richards – acoustic and electric guitars
- Bill Wyman – bass guitar

Additional personnel

- London Bach Choir – choral arrangements by Jack Nitzsche
- Al Kooper – piano, organ, French horn
- Jimmy Miller – drums
- Rocky Dijon – congas, maracas, tambourine
- Madeline Bell – backing vocals
- Nanette Workman – backing vocals (credited as "Nanette Newman" on the LP)
- Doris Troy – backing vocals

=== The Rolling Stones Rock and Roll Circus version ===
The Rolling Stones

- Mick Jagger – lead vocals
- Keith Richards – electric guitar
- Brian Jones – electric guitar
- Bill Wyman – bass guitar
- Charlie Watts – drums

Additional personnel

- Nicky Hopkins – piano
- Kwasi "Rocky" Dzidzornu – percussion

== Charts ==
Chart (1969)	Peak position
Belgium (Ultratop 50 Flanders)	5
Belgium (Ultratop 50 Wallonia)	4
Chart (1973)	Peak position
Canada Top Singles (RPM)	68
US Billboard Hot 100	42
US Cash BoxTop 100	34

== Certifications ==
Region	Certification	Certified units/sales
Australia (ARIA)	Platinum	70,000^{‡}
United Kingdom (BPI)	Silver	200,000^{‡}
^{‡} Sales+streaming figures based on certification alone.
