= One More Shot (song) =

2013 single by the Rolling Stones

Single by The Rolling Stones

from the album GRRR!
- Released: 1 January 2013
- Recorded: 21 and 23 August 2012
- Studio: Guillaume Tell Studios (Paris, France)
- Genre: Hard rock, blues rock
- Length: 3:05
- Label: Universal Music
- Songwriters: Mick Jagger; Keith Richards; Steve Jordan
- Producers: Don Was; The Glimmer Twins; Jeff Bhasker

The Rolling Stones singles chronology
| "Doom and Gloom" (2012) | "One More Shot" (2013) | "Just Your Fool" (2016) |

"One More Shot" is the second single taken from GRRR!, the 50th anniversary compilation album by the Rolling Stones. It was premiered on BBC Radio 6 Music on 8 November 2012. The song marks the first time that Mick Jagger, Keith Richards, Charlie Watts and Ronnie Wood had been in the studio together for seven years, since the recording of their last album, A Bigger Bang. An official audio video was released on YouTube the same day. On 9 January 2013, "One More Shot" was released as a single on iTunes packaged with a remix of the song done by Jeff Bhasker.

The song charted at No. 13 on the Billboard Heritage Rock in 2013.

== Personnel ==
- Mick Jagger – vocals, percussion, production
- Keith Richards – rhythm guitar, backing vocals, production
- Charlie Watts – drums
- Ronnie Wood – lead guitar

Additional musicians

- Darryl Jones – bass guitar
- Chuck Leavell – keyboards

== Charts ==
Chart performance for "One More Shot"
| Chart (2012–2013) | Peak position |
|---|---|
| US Billboard Heritage Rock | 13 |
