= Midnight Rambler =

1969 song by the Rolling Stones

Song by The Rolling Stones

from the album Let It Bleed
- Released: 5 December 1969
- Recorded: Spring 1969
- Studio: Olympic Sound & Trident, London
- Genre: Blues rock; hard rock
- Length: 6:53
- Label: Decca/ABKCO
- Songwriter: Jagger/Richards
- Producer: Jimmy Miller

"Midnight Rambler" is a song by English rock band the Rolling Stones, released on their 1969 album Let It Bleed. The song is a loose biography of Albert DeSalvo, who confessed to being the Boston Strangler.

Keith Richards has called the number "a blues opera" and the quintessential Jagger-Richards song, stating in the 2012 documentary Crossfire Hurricane that "nobody else could have written that song."

== Composition and recording ==
On the composing of the song, Mick Jagger said in a 1995 interview with Rolling Stone,

That's a song Keith and I really wrote together. We were on a holiday in Italy. In this very beautiful hill town, Positano, for a few nights. Why we should write such a dark song in this beautiful, sunny place, I really don't know. We wrote everything there – the tempo changes, everything. And I'm playing the harmonica in these little cafes, and there's Keith with the guitar.

When asked about the song in a 1971 interview with Rolling Stone, Richards said:

Usually when you write, you just kick Mick off on something and let him fly on it, just let it roll out and listen to it and start to pick up on certain words that are coming through, and it's built up on that. A lot of people still complain they can't hear the voice properly. If the words come through it's fine, if they don't, that's all right too, because anyway that can mean a thousand different things to anybody.

The song's lyrics include the verse:

Did you hear about the midnight rambler
Well, honey, it's no rock 'n' roll show
Well, I'm a-talkin' about the midnight gambler
Yeah, the one you never seen before

The studio version of the track (which runs 6:53) was recorded during spring of 1969 at London's Olympic Sound Studios. Jagger performs vocals and harmonica, while Richards plays all guitars using standard tuning for the main guitars and open E tuning on an electric 12-string guitar for the slide. Bill Wyman plays bass and Charlie Watts drums, while multi-instrumentalist Brian Jones is credited with playing the congas. The song bears similarity to "The Boudoir Stomp" and "Edward's Thrump Up", recorded in April 1969 by the band minus Keith Richards and Brian Jones, featuring Ry Cooder on guitar and Nicky Hopkins on piano. The sessions were released on the 1972 LP Jamming With Edward. Jones' congas are (barely) audible during the middle part of the track, playing on the downbeats and following the guitar responding to the lead vocals. It starts at around the 4:30 mark.

== Live performances ==
The Rolling Stones debuted "Midnight Rambler" on stage on 5 July 1969 and performed it regularly in concert through 1976; performances frequently included Jagger crawling around and lashing the stage with his belt. One notable 1969 performance (running just over nine minutes) was captured for the 1970 album Get Yer Ya-Ya's Out! and was re-released on the 1971 compilation album Hot Rocks 1964-1971. This rendition features Mick Taylor on lead guitar, in addition to Jagger, Richards, Wyman and Watts. The bootleg Live'r Than You'll Ever Be includes a performance in Oakland, California, in November 1969. Versions from 1975 following the departure of Taylor from the band feature Ronnie Wood instead of Taylor. Some of the 1975 versions are the longest live renditions ever, clocking in at almost 15 minutes.

"Midnight Rambler" returned to the Rolling Stones' repertoire in 1989 and has remained a powerful concert favourite ever since. The January 2003 rendition featured in the Stones' concert collection Four Flicks runs about twelve minutes, while a briefer July 1995 performance appears on Totally Stripped (2016). The Stones with special guest former band member Mick Taylor played the song at all the concerts of the 50 & Counting... tour, including 12-minute versions of "Midnight Rambler" during their 25 November 2012 concert at London's O2 Arena, at the 2013 Glastonbury Festival, and during their July 2013 Hyde Park concerts, as seen in Sweet Summer Sun: Hyde Park Live.

== Personnel ==
- Mick Jagger – vocals, harmonica
- Keith Richards – electric and slide guitar
- Brian Jones – congas
- Bill Wyman – bass
- Charlie Watts – drums
