= Doom and Gloom =

2012 single by the Rolling Stones

Single by the Rolling Stones

from the album GRRR!
- Released: 11 October 2012
- Recorded: 22–23 August 2012
- Studio: Guillaume Tell Studios (Suresnes, France)
- Genre: Hard rock, blues rock
- Length: 3:59
- Label: Universal Music
- Songwriter: Jagger–Richards
- Producers: Don Was, The Glimmer Twins, Jeff Bhasker, Emile Haynie (co.)

The Rolling Stones singles chronology
"No Spare Parts" (2011)	"Doom and Gloom" (2012)	"One More Shot" (2013)

"Doom and Gloom" is the lead single taken from GRRR!, the 50th anniversary compilation album by the Rolling Stones. It was premiered on BBC Radio 2 on 11 October 2012. The song's recording marked the first time that Mick Jagger, Keith Richards, Charlie Watts and Ronnie Wood had been in the studio together for seven years, since completing their 2005 album A Bigger Bang. A lyric video was released on YouTube the same day.

The song charted at No. 61 on the UK Singles Chart, No. 26 on the Billboard Japan Hot 100 and No. 30 on the Billboard Rock Songs chart in October 2012.

Rolling Stone magazine named "Doom and Gloom" the eighteenth best song of 2012.

== Composition ==
This song represents a reversion to the "open G" guitar tuning that powered Sticky Fingers and Exile on Main St.. The song's opening riff is played by Jagger. Richards commented on Jagger being the driving force behind the song and Jagger playing the opening riff: "I don't give a damn. He'd never have learned how to play that without me teaching him how to do it."

== Music video ==
A music video for the song was released on 20 November 2012 and was directed by Jonas Åkerlund at the Cité du Cinéma in Saint-Denis starring Noomi Rapace.

== Benny Benassi Remix ==
1. Doom And Gloom (Benny Benassi Remix) – 5:00

== Personnel ==
- Mick Jagger – vocals, rhythm guitar, percussion, production
- Keith Richards – rhythm guitar, production
- Ronnie Wood – lead guitar, lap steel guitar
- Charlie Watts – drums

=== Additional musicians ===
- Darryl Jones – bass guitar
- Chuck Leavell – Hammond organ
- Jeff Bhasker – Moog and Juno synthesizers, production
- Emile Haynie – drum programming, production

== Charts ==
Weekly chart performance for "Doom and Gloom"
Chart (2012–2013)	Peak position
Austria (Ö3 Austria Top 40)	60
Belgium (Ultratop 50 Flanders)	37
Belgium (Ultratop 50 Wallonia)	39
Canada Hot 100 (Billboard)	72
France (SNEP)	44
Germany (GfK)	64
Ireland (IRMA)	55
Japan (Billboard Japan Hot 100)	26
Mexico Ingles Airplay (Billboard)	36
Netherlands (Dutch Top 40 Tipparade)	3
Netherlands (Single Top 100)	17
Spain (Promusicae)	38
UK Singles (Official Charts Company)	61
UK Airplay Top 50	21
US Rock Songs (Billboard)	30
US Hot Dance Club Songs (Billboard)	24
US Heritage Rock	8
US Triple A (Billboard)	10
US Hot Rock & Alternative Songs (Billboard)	30
US Rock & Alternative Airplay (Billboard)	35

== In popular culture ==
The song was played in the fourth episode of the 2012 NBC series Do No Harm, when Ian arrives at a formal event.

The song is on the soundtrack for the video game MLB 13: The Show.

The song was played in the end credits to the 2013 film A Good Day to Die Hard.

The song also plays in the 2019 film Avengers: Endgame, when the Avengers gather together and construct a time machine.
