= Four Flicks =

Video by The Rolling Stones
- Released: 11 November 2003
- Recorded: Worldwide from 2002 to 2003
- Genre: Rock
- Label: TGA
- Director: Marty Callner
- Producers: The Rolling Stones, Michael Cohl, Marty Callner, Eileen Gregory

The Rolling Stones chronology
Bridges to Babylon Tour '97–98 (1998)	Four Flicks (2003)	The Biggest Bang (2007)

Four Flicks is a concert DVD collection by British rock band the Rolling Stones, filmed during the band's Licks World Tour in 2002–2003. The collection was released exclusively through Best Buy on 11 November 2003, which caused other retailers to remove the band's previous releases from their stores.

Four Flicks was certified 19× multi-platinum in the United States and 2× diamond in Canada; for a combined total of 675,000 shipments in those regions.

== Track listing ==
=== Disc 1: Documentary ===
- Tip of the Tongue Documentary

==== Extras ====
- Licks Around the World
- Toronto Rocks DVD Trailer
- Bootlegs:
1. "Beast of Burden"
2. "You Don't Have to Mean It"
3. "Rock Me Baby"
4. "Bitch"
5. "I Can't Turn You Loose"
6. "Extreme Western Grip"
7. "Well Well"

(1–4: 4 November 2002 at Wiltern Theatre, Los Angeles, CA, USA)
(5: 8 June 2003 at Circus Krone, Munich, Germany)
(6,7: In-studio)

- Select-a-Stone: "Monkey Man" (Multi-angle)

=== Disc 2: Arena Show ===
18 January 2003 at Madison Square Garden, New York City, NY, USA

1. "Street Fighting Man"
2. "If You Can't Rock Me"
3. "Don't Stop"
4. "Monkey Man"
5. "Angie"
6. "Let It Bleed"
7. "Midnight Rambler"
8. "Thru and Thru"
9. "Happy"
10. "You Got Me Rocking"
11. "Can't You Hear Me Knocking"
12. "Honky Tonk Women" (with Sheryl Crow)
13. "(I Can't Get No) Satisfaction"
14. "It's Only Rock 'n Roll (But I Like It)" (B-stage)
15. "When the Whip Comes Down" (B-stage)
16. "Brown Sugar" (B-stage)
17. "Jumpin' Jack Flash"

==== Extras ====
- Band Commentaries:
1. "Street Fighting Man"
2. "Happy"
3. "It's Only Rock 'n Roll (But I Like It)"
- Sheryl Crow and the Stones
- Making the HBO Special
- Custom Setlist
- Select-a-Stone: "Honky Tonk Women" (Multi-angle) (Concert only)

=== Disc 3: Stadium Show ===
24 August 2003 at Twickenham Stadium, London, England

1. "Brown Sugar"
2. "You Got Me Rocking"
3. "Rocks Off"
4. "Wild Horses"
5. "You Can't Always Get What You Want"
6. "Paint It Black"
7. "Tumbling Dice"
8. "Slipping Away"
9. "Sympathy for the Devil"
10. "Star Star" (B-stage)
11. "I Just Want to Make Love to You" (B-stage)
12. "Street Fighting Man" (B-stage)
13. "Gimme Shelter"
14. "Honky Tonk Women"
15. "(I Can't Get No) Satisfaction"
16. "Jumpin' Jack Flash"

==== Extras ====
- Band Commentaries
1. "Gimme Shelter"
2. "(I Can't Get No) Satisfaction"
3. "Sympathy for the Devil"
- AC/DC and the Stones
- Jumbotron Animation
- Custom Setlist
- Backstage Pass (Concert only)

=== Disc 4: Theatre Show ===
11 July 2003 at Olympia Theater, Paris, France

1. "Start Me Up"
2. "Live with Me"
3. "Neighbours"
4. "Hand of Fate"
5. "No Expectations"
6. "Worried About You"
7. "Doo Doo Doo Doo Doo (Heartbreaker)"
8. "Stray Cat Blues"
9. "Dance (Pt. 1)"
10. "Everybody Needs Somebody to Love"
11. "That's How Strong My Love Is"
12. "Going to a Go-Go"
13. "The Nearness of You"
14. "Before They Make Me Run"
15. "Love Train"
16. "Respectable"
17. "Honky Tonk Women"
18. "Brown Sugar"
19. "Jumpin' Jack Flash"

==== Extras ====
- Band Commentaries
1. "Start Me Up"
2. "Honky Tonk Women"
3. "Jumpin' Jack Flash"
- Solomon Burke and the Stones
- Playing the Olympia
- Custom Setlist
- Backstage Pass (Concert only)
- Select-a-Stone: "Angie" (Multi-angle)

== Charts and certifications ==
=== Weekly charts ===
Chart (2003)	Peak position
Australian DVDs	25
Austrian Music DVDs	3
Dutch Music DVDs	2
German Albums	38
Hungarian DVDs	5
Norwegian Music DVDs	3
Spanish Music DVDs	4
Swedish DVDs	3
Swiss Albums	93
US Comprehensive Music Videos	1

=== Certifications ===
Region	Certification	Certified units/sales
Australia (ARIA)	Gold	7,500^{^}
Austria (IFPI Austria)	Gold	5,000^{*}
Brazil (Pro-Música Brasil)	Gold	25,000^{*}
Canada (Music Canada)	2× Diamond	200,000^{^}
United States (RIAA)	19× Platinum	475,000^{^}
^{*} Sales figures based on certification alone.^{^} Shipments figures based on certification alone.

== See also ==
- The Biggest Bang
