= The Rolling Stones American Tour 1981 =

1981 concert tour by the Rolling Stones

American Tour 1981
- National tour by The Rolling Stones
- Location: North America
- Associated album: Tattoo You
- Start date: 25 September 1981
- End date: 19 December 1981
- Legs: 1
- No. of shows: 50
- Box office: US $52 million ($184.15 million in 2025 dollars)

The Rolling Stones concert chronology
- US Tour 1978 (1978); American Tour 1981 (1981); European Tour 1982 (1982)

The American Tour 1981 was a concert tour by English band the Rolling Stones, promoting their album Tattoo You (1981). The tour visited stadiums and arenas in the United States, and it became the largest grossing tour of 1981 with $50 million in ticket sales. Roughly 2.5 million concert goers attended the concerts, setting various ticket sales records. The 5 December show in New Orleans set an indoor concert attendance record which stood for 33 years.

== History ==
Initially, singer Mick Jagger was not interested in another tour, but guitarists Keith Richards and Ronnie Wood were, as were elements of the press and public. Jagger eventually relented. As with previous tours, the American Tour 1981 was promoted by Bill Graham.

The band rehearsed at Long View Farm, North Brookfield, Massachusetts, from 14 August to 25 September 1981. and played a warm-up show at the Sir Morgan's Cove club in Worcester, Massachusetts on 14 September. Although they were billed as Little Boy Blue & The Cockroaches, word got out and some 11,000 fans pushed and shoved outside the 300-capacity venue. The Mayor of Boston Kevin H. White stopped the notion of further public rehearsals, saying, "The appearance here of Mr. Jagger is not necessarily in the public interest."

The tour's elaborate and colorful stage was the work of Japanese designer Kazuhide Yamazaki. "Most concerts that took place outdoors at the time were played during the day," recalled Jagger, "probably because it was cheaper, I don't know. So we had the bright, bright primary colors... and we had these enormous images of a guitar, a car and a record—an Americana idea—which worked very well for afternoon shows."

Most shows later in the tour featured a cherry picker and the release of hundreds of balloons at the show's end. During the Los Angeles Memorial Coliseum stops on the tour, the band played a Friday and Sunday show and USC had a football game in between on Saturday. As a televised football game, viewers could see the full stage set-up and often field goals would land on stage at the East end zone. While all opening bands were received well, the still unknown to the large audience Prince barely got through three songs before being booed off.

The tour was the largest-grossing tour of 1981, and for several years to come. It grossed $50 million in ticket sales when the average ticket price was $16. Roughly 2.5 million attended the concerts. The Stones set many records that remain unbroken. The JFK Stadium shows in Philadelphia prompted nearly 4 million postcard requests for tickets (a method used at the time to prevent scalping); requests for the five arena shows in the New York metropolitan area were in the millions. The New York Times stated, "The tour is expected to be the most profitable in the history of rock & roll; its sheer size has been staggering...ticket requests for these shows ran into the millions..." The tour indeed did turn out to be profitable: the Stones were estimated to have reaped about $22 million after expenses.

The tour also was an early milestone for the rock industry by selling advertising rights to Jōvan Musk. Jōvan paid a reported $3 million to become the exclusive sponsor of the tour.

In another marketing first, the 18 December performance at Virginia's Hampton Coliseum on Keith Richards' 38th birthday, was broadcast as "The World's Greatest Rock'n'Roll Party", on pay-per-view and in closed circuit cinemas. It was the first such use of pay-per-view for a music event. When a fan ran onstage during the show, Keith Richards hit him with his guitar.

Also of note was the 14 December performance at Kansas City's Kemper Arena. Former Stones guitarist Mick Taylor joined the band for a large part of the performance. Ronnie Wood was not happy with Taylor, however: "[He was] bulldozing through parts of songs that should have been subtle, ignoring breaks and taking uninvited solos." Other guests during the tour were Tina Turner (who would sing "Honky Tonk Women"), Chuck Leavell, Tower of Power, and Sugar Blue. Turner, People reported, had toured with the Stones in 1966 and 1969, and Jagger admitted he had "learned a lot of things" from her.

The 1 October performance at the Rockford MetroCentre in Rockford, Illinois was added to the tour as a result of a petition drive by local radio station WZOK, which attracted more than 35,000 signatures.

In general, there was less backstage debauchery on the tour than on many previous outings. This was largely due to Richards having overcome his well-known heroin addiction; The New York Times wrote of Richards, "He looks healthy, he is playing brilliantly and his backup vocals are often so lusty that they drown out Mr. Jagger, who is working harder to hold up his end of things as result." However, this and the 1982 tour were the last tours on which Richards contributed the majority of backup vocals; for future tours, backup singers were enlisted.

Several of the concerts were recorded and selected songs were released on 1982's live Still Life. The Hal Ashby-directed concert film Let's Spend the Night Together was released in 1983. Possibly due to the film, most of the shows on this tour were professionally recorded.

It was the Stones' last tour of the United States until 1989.

== Personnel ==
=== The Rolling Stones ===
- Mick Jagger – lead vocals, guitar
- Keith Richards – guitar, vocals and backing vocals
- Ronnie Wood – guitar, backing vocals
- Bill Wyman – bass
- Charlie Watts – drums

=== Additional musicians ===
- Lee Allen – saxophone (1 October, Rockford, Illinois, and on 3 and 4 October at Folsom Field, in Boulder, Colorado)
- Ian Stewart – piano
- Ian McLagan – keyboards, backing vocals
- Ernie Watts – saxophone and minor percussion (7 October, San Diego, CA through last show of US tour, 19 December 1981, Hampton Roads Coliseum, Hampton, VA)
- Bobby Keys – saxophone and minor percussion (on 'Going To A Go-Go', 'Let Me Go', 'Let it Bleed', 'Brown Sugar', 'Tumbling Dice', 'Honky Tonk Women', 'Street Fighting Man', 'Jumping Jack Flash' (some shows), from 9 October, Los Angeles, CA through last show of US tour, 19 December 1981, Hampton Roads Coliseum, Hampton, VA)

== Set list ==
The usual set list was:

1. "Under My Thumb"
2. "When the Whip Comes Down"
3. "Let's Spend the Night Together"
4. "Shattered"
5. "Neighbours"
6. "Black Limousine"
7. "Just My Imagination (Running Away with Me)"
8. "Down The Road Apiece" (played 26–27 September; 3, 5, & 9 November)
9. "Mona" (played only 26 September)
10. "Twenty-Flight Rock"
11. "Going to a Go-Go" (first played in Louisville, Kentucky, 3 November)
12. "Let Me Go"
13. "Time Is on My Side"
14. "Beast of Burden"
15. "Waiting on a Friend"
16. "Let It Bleed"
17. "Tops" (Played 25 & 27 September, 3 October)
18. "You Can't Always Get What You Want"
19. "Little T&A"
20. "Tumbling Dice"
21. "She's So Cold"
22. "All Down The Line" (Played 18 Times)
23. "Hang Fire"
24. "Star Star" (Played 10 Times)
25. "Miss You"
26. "Honky Tonk Women"
27. "Brown Sugar"
28. "Start Me Up"
29. "Jumpin' Jack Flash"
30. "Street Fighting Man" (played from 25 September-9 October and 26 October) [encore]
31. "(I Can't Get No) Satisfaction" (played 25 September, 3 & 11 October until end of tour) [encore]
32. "Outro The Star-Spangled Banner (version Jimi Hendrix in Woodstock 1969)" [encore]

For the first dozen or so shows most of the set list was moved around to find the most comfortable feel for the concerts.

== Irregular songs ==
After the first five shows, "Tops" and "Mona" were not played (although neither were ever played on the same night, they did not occupy the same location in the set list). Up until the shows in New Jersey, "Down the Road Apiece" and "Street Fighting Man" made a few appearances. "Star Star" was added into the set for every concert in between and including Boulder and both Orlando shows (with the sole exception of the second show in Boulder). "All Down the Line" was played 18 times in the first 24 regular shows. The six exclusions were the first 4 regular shows and the 2 first shows in November.

The 21 November concert in Saint Paul, Minnesota was memorable because Jesse Ventura, who worked as a body guard on the Tour of the Americas '75, did the introduction, as he had on their 1978 U.S. tour.

== Tour dates ==
List of tour dates with date, city, country, venue, references
Date (1981)	City	Country	Venue	Attendance	Gross	Support act(s)
25 September	Philadelphia	United States	John F. Kennedy Stadium	181,564 / 181,564	$2,859,633	Journey; George Thorogood & the Destroyers
26 September	Philadelphia	United States	John F. Kennedy Stadium	181,564 / 181,564	$2,859,633	Journey; George Thorogood & the Destroyers
27 September	Orchard Park	United States	Rich Stadium	75,000 / 75,000	$1,125,000	Journey; George Thorogood & the Destroyers
1 October	Rockford	United States	Rockford MetroCentre	8,000 / 8,000	—	The Go-Go's
3 October	Boulder	United States	Folsom Field	120,000 / 120,000	$1,920,000	Heart; George Thorogood & the Destroyers
4 October	Boulder	United States	Folsom Field	120,000 / 120,000	$1,920,000	Heart; George Thorogood & the Destroyers
7 October	San Diego	United States	Jack Murphy Stadium	70,000 / 70,000	$1,050,000	The J. Geils Band; George Thorogood & the Destroyers
9 October	Los Angeles	United States	Los Angeles Memorial Coliseum	—	—	Prince; The J. Geils Band; George Thorogood & the Destroyers
11 October	Los Angeles	United States	Los Angeles Memorial Coliseum	—	—	Prince; The J. Geils Band; George Thorogood & the Destroyers
14 October	Seattle	United States	Kingdome	138,264	—	The J. Geils Band; Greg Kihn Band
15 October	Seattle	United States	Kingdome	138,264	—	The J. Geils Band; Greg Kihn Band
17 October	San Francisco	United States	Candlestick Park	135,000 / 135,000	$2,092,500	The J. Geils Band; George Thorogood and the Destroyers
18 October	San Francisco	United States	Candlestick Park	135,000 / 135,000	$2,092,500	The J. Geils Band; George Thorogood and the Destroyers
24 October	Orlando	United States	Tangerine Bowl	121,000 / 121,000	$1,887,600	Henry Paul Band; Van Halen
25 October	Orlando	United States	Tangerine Bowl	121,000 / 121,000	$1,887,600	Henry Paul Band; Van Halen
26 October	Atlanta	United States	Fox Theatre	—	—	Stray Cats
28 October	Houston	United States	Astrodome	65,000 / 65,000	$1,202,500	The Fabulous Thunderbirds; ZZ Top
29 October	Houston	United States	Astrodome	65,000 / 65,000	$1,202,500	The Fabulous Thunderbirds; ZZ Top
31 October	Dallas	United States	Cotton Bowl	156,000 / 156,000	$2,695,332	The Fabulous Thunderbirds; ZZ Top
1 November	Dallas	United States	Cotton Bowl	156,000 / 156,000	$2,695,332	The Fabulous Thunderbirds; ZZ Top
3 November	Louisville	United States	Freedom Hall	18,210 / 18,210	$287,540	The Neville Brothers
5 November	East Rutherford	United States	Brendan Byrne Arena	61,035 / 61,035	$943,782	Tina Turner
6 November	East Rutherford	United States	Brendan Byrne Arena	61,035 / 61,035	$943,782	Tina Turner
7 November	East Rutherford	United States	Brendan Byrne Arena	61,035 / 61,035	$943,782	Tina Turner
9 November	Hartford	United States	Hartford Civic Center	30,389 / 30,389	$455,835	Garland Jeffreys
10 November	Hartford	United States	Hartford Civic Center	30,389 / 30,389	$455,835	Garland Jeffreys
12 November	New York City	United States	Madison Square Garden	39,200 / 39,200	$580,000	Screamin' Jay Hawkins
13 November	New York City	United States	Madison Square Garden	39,200 / 39,200	$580,000	Screamin' Jay Hawkins
16 November	Cleveland	United States	Richfield Coliseum	—	—	Etta James
17 November	Cleveland	United States	Richfield Coliseum	—	—	Etta James
19 November	St. Louis	United States	Checkerdome	18,770 / 18,770	$302,313	The Lamont Cranston Band
20 November	Cedar Falls	United States	UNI-Dome	24,000 / 24,000	$368,156	The Lamont Cranston Band; Stray Cats
21 November	Saint Paul	United States	St. Paul Civic Center	18,600 / 18,600	$292,950	Stray Cats
23 November	Rosemont	United States	Rosemont Horizon	55,230 / 55,230	$822,740	The Neville Brothers
24 November	Rosemont	United States	Rosemont Horizon	55,230 / 55,230	$822,740	The Neville Brothers
25 November	Rosemont	United States	Rosemont Horizon	55,230 / 55,230	$822,740	The Neville Brothers
27 November	Syracuse	United States	Carrier Dome	—	—	Molly Hatchet; Henry Paul Band
28 November	Syracuse	United States	Carrier Dome	—	—	Molly Hatchet; Henry Paul Band
30 November	Pontiac	United States	Pontiac Silverdome	152,696 / 152,696	$2,290,000	Iggy Pop; Santana
1 December	Pontiac	United States	Pontiac Silverdome	152,696 / 152,696	$2,290,000	Iggy Pop; Santana
5 December	New Orleans	United States	Louisiana Superdome	87,500 / 87,500	$1,531,250	George Thorogood and the Destroyers; The Neville Brothers
7 December	Landover	United States	Capital Centre	54,765 / 54,765	$876,826	Bobby Womack
8 December	Landover	United States	Capital Centre	54,765 / 54,765	$876,826	Bobby Womack
9 December	Landover	United States	Capital Centre	54,765 / 54,765	$876,826	Bobby Womack
11 December	Lexington	United States	Rupp Arena	22,954 / 22,954	$363,424	The Meters
13 December	Tempe	United States	Sun Devil Stadium	74,637 / 74,637	$1,287,488	Joe Ely; George Thorogood and the Destroyers
14 December	Kansas City	United States	Kemper Arena	35,026 / 35,026		George Thorogood and the Destroyers
15 December	Kansas City	United States	Kemper Arena	35,026 / 35,026		George Thorogood and the Destroyers
18 December	Hampton	United States	Hampton Coliseum	26,000 / 26,000	$409,500	George Thorogood and the Destroyers
19 December	Hampton	United States	Hampton Coliseum	26,000 / 26,000	$409,500	George Thorogood and the Destroyers
TOTAL				1,762,240	$25,351,419	

== See also ==
- List of highest-grossing concert tours
- Hampton Coliseum (Live 1981)
- Let's Spend the Night Together
