= Licked Live in NYC =

Live album by the Rolling Stones
- Released: 10 June 2022
- Recorded: 18 January 2003
- Venue: Madison Square Garden; New York City, New York, U.S.
- Genre: Rock
- Length: 129:01
- Label: Mercury Studios

The Rolling Stones chronology
El Mocambo 1977 (2022)	Licked Live in NYC (2022)	Grrr Live! (2023)

Professional ratings
Review scores
Source	Rating
All About Jazz	5/5 stars

Licked Live in NYC is a live album by English rock band the Rolling Stones. It was recorded on 18 January 2003 on the Licks Tour in support of their 40th anniversary compilation album Forty Licks. The tour grossed over $300 million, becoming the second highest grossing tour at that time, behind their own Voodoo Lounge Tour of 1994–1995.

The concert was originally broadcast live on American pay television network HBO and featured an appearance by Sheryl Crow on "Honky Tonk Women".

Licked Live in NYC was released as Blu-ray and DVD video, as well as audio-only on 2-CD, 3-LP white vinyl or digital download.

== Track listing ==
All tracks are written by Mick Jagger and Keith Richards.

Disc one
No.	Title	Length
1.	"Intro"	0:49
2.	"Street Fighting Man"	4:13
3.	"Start Me Up"	4:23
4.	"If You Can't Rock Me"	5:05
5.	"Don't Stop"	5:05
6.	"Monkey Man"	4:04
7.	"Angie"	4:05
8.	"Let It Bleed"	5:13
9.	"Midnight Rambler"	13:01
10.	"Tumbling Dice"	5:33
11.	"Band introductions"	4:44
12.	"Thru and Thru"	7:12
13.	"Happy"	3:44
Total length:		67:11

Disc two
No.	Title	Length
1.	"Gimme Shelter"	7:11
2.	"You Got Me Rocking"	3:47
3.	"Can't You Hear Me Knocking"	11:07
4.	"Honky Tonk Women" (with Sheryl Crow)	5:01
5.	"(I Can't Get No) Satisfaction"	6:11
6.	"It's Only Rock 'n Roll (But I Like It)"	5:03
7.	"When the Whip Comes Down"	4:51
8.	"Brown Sugar"	5:37
9.	"Sympathy for the Devil"	6:49
10.	"Jumpin' Jack Flash"	6:12
Total length:		61:49

== Personnel ==
The Rolling Stones

- Mick Jagger – lead vocals, guitars, harmonica
- Keith Richards – lead vocals on "Happy" and "Thru and Thru", rhythm guitar
- Ronnie Wood – lead guitar
- Charlie Watts – drums

Additional personnel

- Darryl Jones – bass guitar, backing vocals
- Matt Clifford – keyboards, French horn
- Chuck Leavell – keyboards, backing vocals
- Bobby Keys – saxophone
- Bernard Fowler – backing vocals
- Lisa Fischer – backing vocals
- Blondie Chaplin – backing vocals, acoustic guitar, percussion
- Tim Ries – saxophone, keyboards
- Kent Smith – trumpet
- Michael Davis – trombone

== Charts ==
Chart performance for Licked Live in NYC
Chart (2022)	Peak position
Austrian Albums (Ö3 Austria)	7
Belgian Albums (Ultratop Flanders)	13
Belgian Albums (Ultratop Wallonia)	20
Dutch Albums (Album Top 100)	8
French Albums (SNEP)	99
German Albums (Offizielle Top 100)	7
Spanish Albums (PROMUSICAE)	47
Swiss Albums (Schweizer Hitparade)	19
