= Let's Spend the Night Together (film) =

1983 live concert film by The Rolling Stones

- Directed by: Hal Ashby
- Produced by: Ronald L. Schwary
- Starring: The Rolling Stones
- Music by: The Rolling Stones
- Distributed by: Embassy Pictures
- Release date: February 11, 1983
- Running time: 95 minutes
- Country: United States
- Language: English
- Box office: $1,504,178

Let's Spend the Night Together is a live concert film, documenting the Rolling Stones' 1981 North American Tour. It was directed by Hal Ashby, and released in cinemas in February 11, 1983. It was filmed at the Brendan Byrne Arena in East Rutherford, New Jersey on 5–6 November 1981 and at Sun Devil Stadium in Tempe, Arizona on 13 December 1981.

The live album Still Life, released in 1982, was recorded during the same tour.

== Track listing ==
1. "Under My Thumb" – (Tempe, Arizona, 13 December 1981 (outdoor stadium show))
2. "Let's Spend the Night Together" – (Tempe, 13 December 1981)
3. "Shattered" – (Tempe, 13 December 1981)
4. "Neighbours" – (Tempe, 13 December 1981)
5. "Black Limousine" – (Tempe, 13 December 1981)
6. "Just My Imagination (Running Away with Me)" – (Tempe, 13 December 1981)
7. "Twenty Flight Rock" – (Tempe, 13 December 1981)
8. "Let Me Go" – (Tempe, 13 December 1981)
9. "Time Is on My Side" – (Tempe, 13 December 1981)
10. "Beast of Burden" – (Tempe, 13 December 1981)
11. "Waiting on a Friend" – (Tempe, 13 December 1981)
12. "Going to a Go-Go" – (East Rutherford, New Jersey, 6 November 1981 (indoor arena show))
13. "You Can't Always Get What You Want" – (East Rutherford, 6 November 1981)
14. "Little T&A" – (East Rutherford, New Jersey, 5 November 1981)
15. "Tumbling Dice" – (East Rutherford, 5 November 1981)
16. "She's So Cold" – (East Rutherford, 5 November 1981)
17. "All Down the Line" – (East Rutherford, 5 November 1981)
18. "Hang Fire" – (East Rutherford, 5 November 1981)
19. "Miss You" – (East Rutherford, 6 November 1981)
20. "Let It Bleed" – (East Rutherford, 5 November 1981)
21. "Start Me Up" – (East Rutherford, 5 November 1981)
22. "Honky Tonk Women" – (Tempe, 13 December 1981)
23. "Brown Sugar" – (East Rutherford, 5 November 1981)
24. "Jumpin' Jack Flash" – (Tempe, 13 December 1981)
25. "Satisfaction" – (East Rutherford, 6 November 1981)
26. "Outro: Star Spangled Banner" Trad. (arr. Jimi Hendrix)

== Home video releases ==
Let's Spend the Night Together was subsequently released on VHS, Betamax, Laserdisc, VHD and CED Videodisc. It was released in New Zealand and Australia with the alternative title Time Is on Our Side on VHS and is currently available on DVD in Japan, Australia and New Zealand (as L.S.T.N.T from Studio Canal/Universal). The film was released as Rocks Off in Germany in 1982 with slightly different footage and an additional song, "When the Whip Comes Down" (following "Under My Thumb"), performed at Sun Devil Stadium. Lions Gate Entertainment released the film on DVD in the United States on 2 November 2010. Kino Lorber released the film on 4K UHD Blu-ray in 2026.

== Personnel ==
The Rolling Stones

- Mick Jagger – lead vocals, guitar on "When the Whip Comes Down", "Just My Imagination", acoustic guitar on "Let It Bleed"
- Keith Richards – guitar, vocals
- Ronnie Wood – guitar, backing vocals
- Charlie Watts – drums
- Bill Wyman – bass guitar

Additional musicians

- Ian McLagan – organ
- Ian Stewart – piano
- Ernie Watts – saxophone, tambourine
- Bobby Keys – saxophone
