= El Mocambo 1977 =

Live album by the Rolling Stones
- Released: 13 May 2022
- Recorded: 4–5 March 1977
- Venue: El Mocambo, Toronto, Canada
- Genre: Rock
- Length: 107:00
- Label: Polydor

The Rolling Stones chronology
Steel Wheels Live (2020)	El Mocambo 1977 (2022)	Licked Live in NYC (2022)

El Mocambo 1977 (also referred to as Live at the El Mocambo) is a live album by the English rock band the Rolling Stones, released on 13 May 2022. It was recorded on 4 and 5 March 1977 at the El Mocambo club in Toronto, Canada. The club had a capacity of 300, and the gigs were "secret", with winners of a contest invited to see Canadian rock band April Wine with support from a group called "the Cockroaches", who were actually the Stones accompanied by keyboardist Billy Preston and percussionist Ollie Brown. The set promoted the band's then-most recent studio album Black and Blue (1976); most tracks were taken from the second night (5 March), with only three from the first night: "Luxury", "Melody" and the previously unreleased "Worried About You" (found on Tattoo You from 1981). Four songs recorded at the El Mocambo had been released in 1977 on the live compilation album Love You Live.

It was the first release from the Rolling Stones since the August 2021 death of drummer Charlie Watts.

== Critical reception ==
Professional ratings
Aggregate scores
Source	Rating
Metacritic	86/100
Review scores
Source	Rating
All About Jazz	4.5/5 stars
American Songwriter	4/5 stars
Rolling Stone	4/5 stars

El Mocambo 1977 received a score of 86 out of 100 based on nine critics' reviews at review aggregator Metacritic, indicating "universal acclaim". Doug Collette of All About Jazz summarized the album as "recordings worth waiting for all these forty-five years since they happened" and felt that it is "quite conceivable that, in fairly short order, this title will become the go-to choice for both aficionados and curious dilettantes". Hal Horowitz of American Songwriter called the 23 tracks a "solid, diverse set" that has "rightfully gone down in the tome of the Rolling Stones, and by extension rock and roll overall, as two of the most desirable times fans fantasize about being in the presence of a once-in-lifetime event". David Browne of Rolling Stone wrote that the band "play[s] with a ferocity that proves they were more than bored, disconnected rock stars" and the album "rolls out a band that was living in the moment, trying hard not to suck in the Seventies".

== Track listing ==
All tracks are written by Mick Jagger and Keith Richards, except where noted.

El Mocambo 1977 track listing
No.	Title	Writer(s)	Length
1.	"Honky Tonk Women"		3:36
2.	"All Down the Line"		4:12
3.	"Hand of Fate"		4:27
4.	"Route 66"	Bobby Troup	3:13
5.	"Fool to Cry"		4:57
6.	"Crazy Mama"		4:59
7.	"Mannish Boy"	McKinley Morganfield; Mel London; Bo Diddley	6:02
8.	"Crackin' Up"	Bo Diddley	4:14
9.	"Dance Little Sister"		4:52
10.	"Around and Around"	Chuck Berry	3:53
11.	"Tumbling Dice"		4:56
12.	"Hot Stuff"		5:28
13.	"Star Star"		4:24
14.	"Let's Spend the Night Together"		3:48
15.	"Worried Life Blues"	Maceo Merriweather	5:26
16.	"Little Red Rooster"	Willie Dixon	4:50
17.	"It's Only Rock 'n Roll (But I Like It)"		4:55
18.	"Rip This Joint"		2:11
19.	"Brown Sugar"		3:24
20.	"Jumpin' Jack Flash"		5:26
21.	"Melody"		4:42
22.	"Luxury"		5:11
23.	"Worried About You"		8:11
Total length:			107:21

The Rolling Stones is

- Mick Jagger – lead vocals
- Keith Richards – lead and rhythm guitar, backing vocals
- Ronnie Wood – rhythm, lead and slide guitar, backing vocals in "Star Star"
- Bill Wyman – bass guitar
- Charlie Watts – drums

== Charts ==
Chart performance for El Mocambo 1977
Chart (2022)	Peak position
Australian Albums (ARIA)	91
Austrian Albums (Ö3 Austria)	5
Belgian Albums (Ultratop Flanders)	12
Belgian Albums (Ultratop Wallonia)	12
Dutch Albums (Album Top 100)	4
French Albums (SNEP)	24
German Albums (Offizielle Top 100)	5
Italian Albums (FIMI)	50
Japanese Albums (Oricon)	8
Portuguese Albums (AFP)	41
Scottish Albums (OCC)	5
Spanish Albums (PROMUSICAE)	17
Swedish Albums (Sverigetopplistan)	34
Swiss Albums (Schweizer Hitparade)	5
UK Albums (OCC)	24
US Billboard 200	61
US Top Rock Albums (Billboard)	8

== See also ==
- Love You Live, the Rolling Stones' 1977 album that included several tracks from the sets with overdubs
- Live at the El Mocambo (April Wine album), recorded the same nights as the album
