= Little T & A =

Song by the Rolling Stones

from the album Tattoo You
- Released: 24 August 1981
- Recorded: January–February 1979, April–June 1981
- Genre: Rock and roll
- Length: 3:23
- Label: Rolling Stones/Virgin
- Songwriter: Jagger/Richards
- Producer: The Glimmer Twins

Tattoo You track listing
- 11 tracks Side one: 1. "Start Me Up"; 2. "Hang Fire"; 3. "Slave"; 4. "Little T&A"; 5. "Black Limousine"; 6. "Neighbours"; Side two: 7. "Worried About You"; 8. "Tops"; 9. "Heaven"; 10. "No Use in Crying"; 11. "Waiting on a Friend"

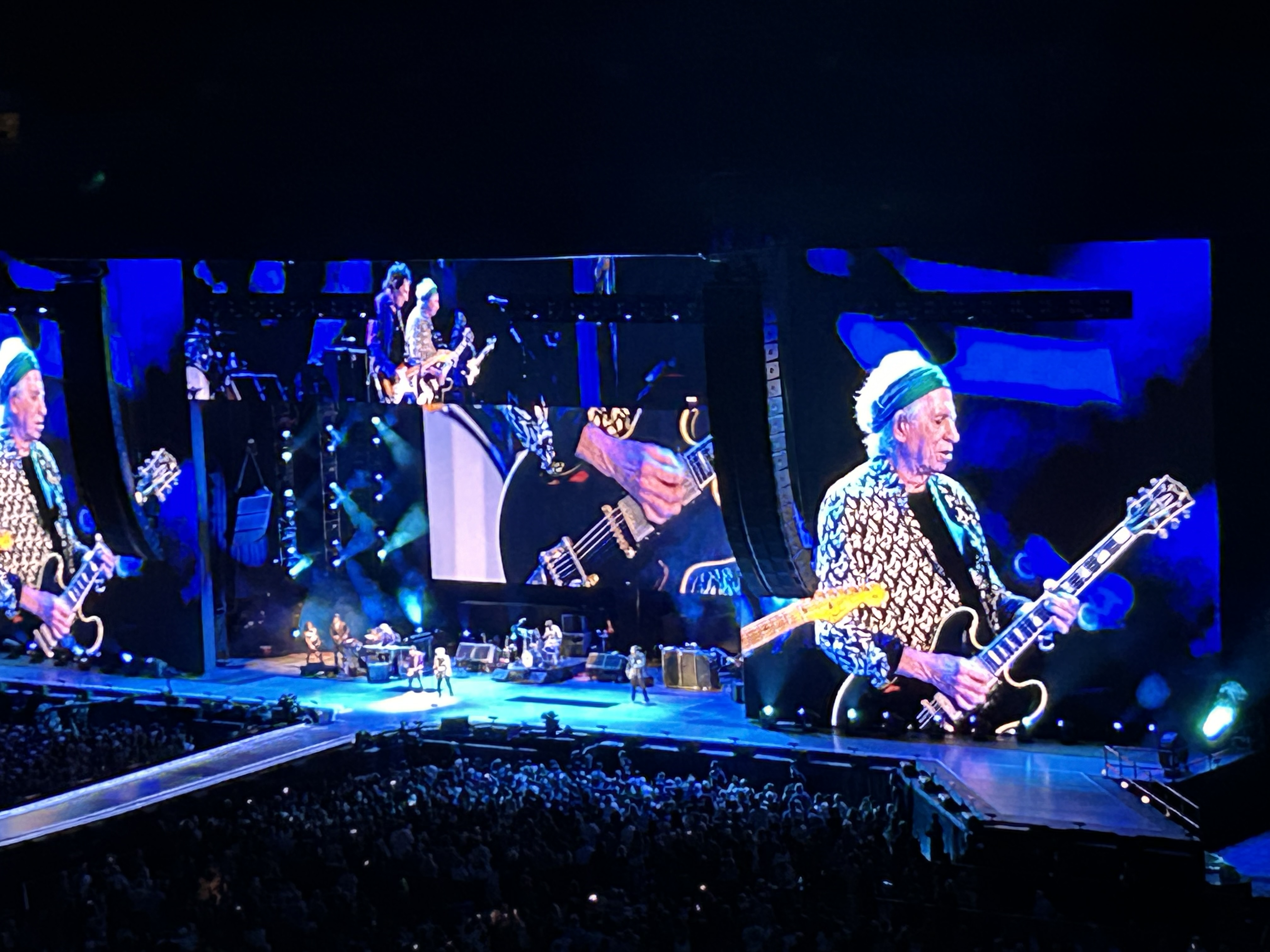
The Rolling Stones performing "Little T&A" on July 5, 2024 at BC Place in Vancouver

"Little T & A" is the fourth song on the English rock and roll band the Rolling Stones' 1981 album Tattoo You. The song is sung by guitarist Keith Richards. It was the B-side of their single "Waiting on a Friend". Although, never released as a commercial single it peaked at #5 on the US Billboard Top Rock Tracks.

Credited to usual Stones' writers Mick Jagger and Richards, "Little T & A" was largely a Richards composition. He originally began writing the song in the early months of 1979 with the intention of having the song featured on 1980s Emotional Rescue. Left off that album, it re-emerged for Tattoo You just two years later. The Stones began reworking the track in mid-1981.

"Little T & A" is a straightforward rocker, and Richards claims to have been influenced by rockabilly in his guitar performance. The song opens with a trademark riff from Richards, who plays bass and electric guitar along with Ronnie Wood. Ian Stewart performs on piano for the song and Jagger provides backing vocals along with Richards and Wood. Charlie Watts plays drums.

The lyrics of "Little T & A" were described by Richards at the time as being about 'every good time I've had with somebody I'd met for a night or two and never seen again ("T & A" standing for "tits and ass"). And also about the shit that sometimes goes down when you just sort of bump into people unknowingly, and not knowing the scene you're walking in on, you know? You pick up a chick and end up spending the night in the tank, you know?'

"Little T & A" has a distinctive ending featuring a breakdown of the song's riff and beat. While the title of the song is never sung, a frequently repeated chorus: 'She's my little rock & roll/My tits and ass with soul, baby' is featured throughout.

The song was performed throughout the American Tour 1981 and European Tour 1982, and was included on the concert film Let's Spend the Night Together. Richards reinstated the song to the band's setlist during the 2006 leg of their Bigger Bang Tour, when it was played infrequently. A live performance, captured for the documentary Shine a Light, was included on the soundtrack of the same name. It was also played infrequently on Richards's 1988 tour with the X-Pensive Winos in support of the album Talk Is Cheap.

"Little T & A" was also heard on the soundtrack of the 2012 film Argo, however its inclusion is something of an anachronism as the film takes place in late 1979 to early 1980, over a year before the song was ever released.

== Personnel ==
According to the 2021 reissue liner notes and the authors Philippe Margotin and Jean-Michel Guesdon.

The Rolling Stones

- Keith Richards – lead vocals, rhythm guitar, bass guitar
- Mick Jagger – backing vocals
- Ronnie Wood – rhythm guitar
- Charlie Watts – drums

Additional personnel

- Ian Stewart – piano

Technical

- The Glimmer Twins – producers
- Chris Kimsey – associate producer, engineer
- Bob Clearmountain – engineer
- Gary Lyons – engineer
- Barry Sage – assistant engineer

Note: Margotin and Guesdon are unsure who played lead guitar and if Richards played bass.
