= Slave (Rolling Stones song) =

1981 song by the Rolling Stones

Song by the Rolling Stones

from the album Tattoo You
- Released: 24 August 1981
- Recorded: January–February 1975, June 1981
- Genre: Blues rock; jazz fusion; reggae rock
- Length: 4:59 (original 1981 vinyl release); 6:33 (1994 re-release)
- Label: Rolling Stones/Virgin
- Songwriter: Jagger/Richards
- Producer: The Glimmer Twins

Tattoo You track listing
- 11 tracks Side one: 1. "Start Me Up"; 2. "Hang Fire"; 3. "Slave"; 4. "Little T&A"; 5. "Black Limousine"; 6. "Neighbours"; Side two: 7. "Worried About You"; 8. "Tops"; 9. "Heaven"; 10. "No Use in Crying"; 11. "Waiting on a Friend"

"Slave" is a song by the English rock band the Rolling Stones from their 1981 album Tattoo You.

Written by Mick Jagger and Keith Richards, "Slave" was originally recorded in Rotterdam, Netherlands (under the working title "Vagina"), using the Rolling Stones Mobile Studio in late January or early February 1975. During that time, the Rolling Stones were faced with the unexpected challenge of filling the recently vacated position of second guitarist, after the abrupt departure of Mick Taylor. The track features Billy Preston on electric piano and organ (although the organ could also have been played by Ian Stewart). The Who's Pete Townshend provided backing vocals for the recording and one of saxophonist Sonny Rollins' three performances on tracks for the album appeared as well. Percussion by Ollie E. Brown was recorded in 1975, with Mike Carabello adding conga during the 1981 overdub sessions.

Called "...a standard Stones blues jam" in the album review by Rolling Stone magazine, "Slave" was the result of the Stones' experiments with funk and dance music during the Black and Blue recording sessions of 1974/75. The lyrics are sparse outside of a brief spoken verse by Jagger and the refrain of "Don't want to be your slave". Richards provides the electric guitar part for the song, with Charlie Watts and Bill Wyman supporting on drums and bass, respectively.

The song was never performed by the Stones on stage - although rehearsed in 2002 - and appears on no compilation album.

The 1994 Virgin Records and 2009 Polydor CD reissues of Tattoo You contain an additional 90 seconds of "Slave".

== Personnel ==
According to the 2021 reissue liner notes and the authors Philippe Margotin and Jean-Michel Guesdon.

The Rolling Stones

- Mick Jagger – lead vocals
- Keith Richards – lead guitar, backing vocals
- Bill Wyman – bass guitar
- Charlie Watts – drums

Additional personnel

- Billy Preston – organ
- Ollie E. Brown – percussion
- Pete Townshend – backing vocals
- Sonny Rollins – saxophone
- Michael Carabello – conga

Technical

- The Glimmer Twins – producers
- Chris Kimsey – associate producer, engineer
- Keith Harwood – engineer
- Bob Clearmountain – engineer
- Gary Lyons – engineer
- Barry Sage – assistant engineer

Note: Margotin and Guesdon are unsure if Jagger played tambourine and if Carabella played congas.
