= Live Licks =

Live album by the Rolling Stones
- Released: 1 November 2004
- Recorded: 4 November 2002; 18 January 2003; 11 July 2003; 24 August 2003
- Genre: Rock
- Length: 109:19
- Label: Virgin
- Producers: Don Was, the Glimmer Twins

The Rolling Stones chronology
Forty Licks (2004)	Live Licks (2004)	A Bigger Bang (2005)

Professional ratings
Review scores
Source	Rating
AllMusic	3/5 stars
Rolling Stone	4/5 stars
Tom Hull	B+

Live Licks is a 2004 double CD by the Rolling Stones, their ninth official live album. Coming six years after No Security, it features performances from the 2002–2003 Licks Tour in support of the career-spanning, fortieth anniversary retrospective Forty Licks. The album includes "an entire side of songs never before recorded live", and features only one song recorded after 1981's Tattoo You ("You Don't Have to Mean It" from Bridges to Babylon).

== History ==
The first CD contains "the familiar classics" while the second features "some covers, b-sides and album tracks from the more obscure end of their back catalogue".

Sheryl Crow appears on "Honky Tonk Women", while Solomon Burke sings on his own "Everybody Needs Somebody to Love", which the Rolling Stones originally covered on The Rolling Stones No. 2 in 1965.

The Rolling Stones released two subtly different versions of cover art for Live Licks. While both feature a woman astride the Rolling Stones logo's tongue, in the British version she has no bikini top.

Unlike all their previous live albums, Live Licks features virtually none of the band's recent compositions, and includes only one track which was released in the preceding two decades. In all there are nine songs from the 1960s, eight from the 1970s, three from the 1980s (all from Tattoo You), one from the 1997 release Bridges to Babylon, and two previously unreleased covers.

== Reception ==
Live Licks peaked at No. 38 in the UK Albums Chart, and No. 50 in the US, being certified gold on 9 December 2004, according to the RIAA.^{[^{ʌ}3]}

The BBC suggested that "even for cynics it demonstrates how potent they remain as a live act, despite not frightening the horses as much these days". It concluded that, "[like] Bowie, the Stones may no longer be churning out hits but they still know how to mount a spectacle, as this release amply proves."

David Fricke wrote that "Live Licks is the Stones' first live album since Ya-Ya’s to earn a spot next to my best soundboard and broadcast boots. One good reason: a bright, hard mix that nails the Stones' matured vigor onstage".

== Track listing ==
All tracks are written by Mick Jagger and Keith Richards, except where noted.

Disc one
No.	Title	Length
1.	"Brown Sugar"	3:50
2.	"Street Fighting Man"	3:43
3.	"Paint It Black"	3:45
4.	"You Can't Always Get What You Want"	6:46
5.	"Start Me Up"	4:02
6.	"It's Only Rock 'n Roll (But I Like It)"	4:54
7.	"Angie"	3:29
8.	"Honky Tonk Women" (with Sheryl Crow)	3:24
9.	"Happy"	3:38
10.	"Gimme Shelter"	6:50
11.	"(I Can't Get No) Satisfaction"	4:55

Disc two
No.	Title	Writer(s)	Length
1.	"Neighbours"		3:41
2.	"Monkey Man"		3:41
3.	"Rocks Off"		3:42
4.	"Can't You Hear Me Knocking"		10:02
5.	"That's How Strong My Love Is"	Roosevelt Jamison	4:45
6.	"The Nearness of You"	Hoagy Carmichael; Ned Washington	4:34
7.	"Beast of Burden"		4:09
8.	"When the Whip Comes Down"		4:28
9.	"Rock Me Baby"	B. B. King; Joe Bihari	3:50
10.	"You Don't Have to Mean It"		4:35
11.	"Worried About You"		6:01
12.	"Everybody Needs Somebody to Love" (with Solomon Burke)	Bert Berns; Solomon Burke; Jerry Wexler	6:35

Japanese edition bonus track
No.	Title	Length
13.	"If You Can't Rock Me"	2:48

== Personnel ==
The Rolling Stones

- Mick Jagger – lead vocals, harmonica, guitar on "When the Whip Comes Down", percussion on "Can't You Hear Me Knocking", keyboards on "Worried About You"
- Keith Richards – guitars, backing vocals on "Honky Tonk Women", lead vocals on "Happy", "The Nearness of You" and "You Don't Have to Mean It"
- Ron Wood – guitars, piano on "You Don't Have To Mean It"
- Charlie Watts – drums

Additional musicians

- Darryl Jones – bass guitar
- Chuck Leavell – keyboards, backing vocals
- Bernard Fowler – backing vocals, percussion, keyboards on "Can't You Hear Me Knocking"
- Lisa Fischer – backing vocals, percussion on "(I Can't Get No) Satisfaction", "Can't You Hear Me Knocking", and “Gimme Shelter”
- Blondie Chaplin – backing vocals, percussion, acoustic guitar on "(I Can't Get No) Satisfaction", electric guitar on "You Don't Have To Mean It"
- Bobby Keys – saxophone
- Andy Snitzer – saxophone, keyboards
- Michael Davis – trombone
- Kent Smith – trumpet

Special guest musicians

- Solomon Burke – duet on "Everybody Needs Somebody to Love"
- Sheryl Crow – duet on "Honky Tonk Women"

== Charts ==
Chart performance for Live Licks
Chart (2004)	Peak position
Austrian Albums (Ö3 Austria)	13
Belgian Albums (Ultratop Flanders)	47
Belgian Albums (Ultratop Wallonia)	49
Dutch Albums (Album Top 100)	19
French Albums (SNEP)	38
German Albums (Offizielle Top 100)	9
Italian Albums (FIMI)	34
Japanese Albums (Oricon)	19
Norwegian Albums (VG-lista)	38
Portuguese Albums (AFP)	27
Spanish Albums (Promusicae)	43
Swedish Albums (Sverigetopplistan)	16
Swiss Albums (Schweizer Hitparade)	21
UK Albums (Official Charts)	38
US Billboard 200	50

== Certifications ==
Certifications for Live Licks
Region	Certification	Certified units/sales
Argentina (CAPIF)	Gold	20,000^{^}
Austria (IFPI Austria)	Gold	15,000^{*}
Netherlands (NVPI)	Gold	40,000^{^}
Portugal (AFP)	Gold	20,000^{^}
United Kingdom (BPI)	Gold	100,000^{*}
United States (RIAA)	Gold	500,000^{^}
^{*} Sales figures based on certification alone.^{^} Shipments figures based on certification alone.
