= Black Limousine =

1981 song by The Rolling Stones

Song by the Rolling Stones

from the album Tattoo You
- Released: 24 August 1981
- Recorded: January–March 1978, April–June 1981
- Genre: Blues rock, hard rock
- Length: 3:31
- Label: Rolling Stones/Virgin
- Songwriters: Jagger–Richards, Ronnie Wood
- Producer: The Glimmer Twins

Tattoo You track listing
- 11 tracks Side one: 1. "Start Me Up"; 2. "Hang Fire"; 3. "Slave"; 4. "Little T&A"; 5. "Black Limousine"; 6. "Neighbours"; Side two: 7. "Worried About You"; 8. "Tops"; 9. "Heaven"; 10. "No Use in Crying"; 11. "Waiting on a Friend"

"Black Limousine" is a song by the English rock band the Rolling Stones featured on their 1981 album Tattoo You.

== The song ==
"Black Limousine" is one of two songs on Tattoo You credited to Mick Jagger, Keith Richards and Ronnie Wood. "Black Limousine" is a hard blues number (described as "fast mid-tempo blues of no specific nature" by Jagger) which heavily hearkens back to the Rolling Stones' earliest recordings from their ABCKO/London albums. Using a heavy bellow, Jagger delivers his lines and spells out the growing rifts in an aging romance:

We used to shine, shine, shine, shine, Say what a pair, say what a team/We used to ride, ride, ride, ride, In a long black limousine/Those dreams are gone baby, Locked away and never seen/Well now look at your face now baby, Look at you and look at me.

On the lyrics, Richards said in 1981, "That song does have a more generous view of relationships with women... I guess, because the women in our lives at the moment have made a change in our attitudes toward it. I guess because everything that comes out from the Stones is just as it comes out... That's how we used to feel about it, and that's how we feel about it now. This is purely a guess... but it seems logical that the people you're with are the ones who are gonna influence you most, whether you intend it or not. Mick might intend to sit down and write a real Stones song - you know, 'Blechhh! You cruddy piece of shit, you dirty old scrub box!' But obviously, that's not the way he's feeling now. It's not the way I'm feeling now."

On the music, Wood said in 2003, "'Black Limousine' came about from a slide guitar riff that was inspired in part by some Hop Wilson licks from a record that I once owned... And there was another guy called Big Moose, who I've never heard of before or since... He was an old slide guitar guy who had one particular lick that he would bring in every now and again. I thought, 'That's really good, I'm going to apply that' - and so subconsciously I wrote the whole song around that one little lick, building on it, resolving it and taking it round again... That was something that clicked musically straight away with the guitars and drums and Mick, and then we immediately got into sparring about the lyrics for it, since it was obviously crying out for some words... Mick's got his own style and that's why I let him interpret it in his own way..."

== Recording and aftermath ==
Recording began in January and ran through March 1978 during the band's sessions at Paris' Pathé Marconi Studios for the album Some Girls. The song re-emerged during the Tattoo You sessions in late 1980. With Jagger on vocals and shrieking harmonica, Richards and Wood performing the song's electric guitars, with Wood providing the solo. Ian Stewart performs the song's piano. Charlie Watts and Bill Wyman perform the song's drums and bass, respectively.

On his rare credit, Wood continued, saying, "I fought until I was blue in the face to get the credit, going on and on: 'I wrote that, I wrote that.' One of the lessons I had to learn was that if you want to get a credit, it has to happen there and then in the studio, as you're recording it."

"Black Limousine" was performed heavily by the band during their American Tour 1981/European Tour 1982, and was included in the concert film Let's Spend the Night Together. The song was also performed during the 1995 leg of the Voodoo Lounge Tour. A recording was featured as a bonus track on the Japanese release of 1995's Stripped, as well as being the B-side to the album's lead single "Like a Rolling Stone".

== Personnel ==
According to the 2021 reissue liner notes and the authors Philippe Margotin and Jean-Michel Guesdon.

The Rolling Stones

- Mick Jagger – lead vocals, harmonica
- Keith Richards – rhythm guitar
- Ronnie Wood – lead guitar
- Bill Wyman – bass guitar
- Charlie Watts – drums

Additional personnel

- Ian Stewart – piano

Technical

- The Glimmer Twins – producers
- Chris Kimsey – associate producer, engineer
- Bob Clearmountain – engineer
- Gary Lyons – engineer
- Barry Sage – assistant engineer
