= Still Life (Rolling Stones album) =

Live album by the Rolling Stones
- Released: 1 June 1982
- Recorded: 5–6 November 1981; 25 November 1981; 8–9 December 1981; 13 December 1981; 18–19 December 1981; Overdubs: March–April 1982
- Genre: Rock
- Length: 40:08
- Label: Rolling Stones/Atlantic
- Producer: The Glimmer Twins

The Rolling Stones chronology
Tattoo You (1981)	Still Life (1982)	Undercover (1983)

Singles from Still Life
- 1. "Going to a Go-Go" Released: 1 June 1982; 2. "Time Is on My Side" Released: 13 September 1982

Still Life (American Concert 1981) is a live album by the English rock band the Rolling Stones, released on 1 June 1982. Recorded during the band's 1981 American tour, it was released in time for their 1982 European tour.

The album cover is a painting by Japanese artist Kazuhide Yamazaki, whose work inspired the tour's stage design.

== Release and reception ==
Professional ratings
Review scores
Source	Rating
AllMusic	1/5 stars
Christgau's Record Guide	B−
MusicHound	1/5 stars
Rolling Stone	3.5/5 stars
The Rolling Stone Album Guide	2/5 stars
Tom Hull	B+

The album was preceded by the release of a cover version of the Miracles' "Going to a Go-Go", which became a Top 30 hit in the United Kingdom and United States; the follow-up single, "Time Is on My Side", reached the lower part of the UK chart.

Still Life was a commercial success, reaching number 4 in the UK Albums Chart and number 5 in the U.S., and going Platinum in the U.S. and Canada, as well as Gold in the UK, but was not critically well-received, being admonished for sounding too slick and lacking any rough edges expected in a Rolling Stones performance.

In 1998, Still Life was remastered and reissued by Virgin Records, and again in 2010 by Universal Music. It was released on SHM-SACD in 2011 by Universal Music Japan.

== Track listing ==
All tracks are written by Mick Jagger and Keith Richards, except where noted.

Side one
No.	Title	Length
1.	"Intro: Take the 'A' Train" (Billy Strayhorn)	0:27
2.	"Under My Thumb" (East Rutherford 5.11.81)	4:18
3.	"Let's Spend the Night Together" (Hampton 18.12.81)	3:51
4.	"Shattered" (Hampton 18.12.81)	4:11
5.	"Twenty Flight Rock" (Eddie Cochran, Ned Fairchild, (Largo 9.12.81))	1:48
6.	"Going to a Go-Go" (William Robinson, Warren Moore, Robert Rogers, Marvin Tarplin, (Largo 9.12.81))	3:21

Side two
No.	Title	Length
1.	"Let Me Go" (Largo 8.12.81)	3:37
2.	"Time Is on My Side" (Norman Meade, (Hampton 18.12.81))	3:39
3.	"Just My Imagination (Running Away with Me)" (Norman Whitfield, Barrett Strong, (Hampton 19.12.81))	5:23
4.	"Start Me Up" (Chicago 25.11.81)	4:21
5.	"(I Can't Get No) Satisfaction" (Tempe 13.12.81)	4:24
6.	"Outro: Star Spangled Banner" (Trad. (arr. Jimi Hendrix))	0:48

== Personnel ==
The Rolling Stones

- Mick Jagger – lead vocals, guitar
- Keith Richards – guitar, backing vocals
- Ronnie Wood – guitar, backing vocals
- Bill Wyman – bass guitar
- Charlie Watts – drums

Additional personnel

- Ian Stewart – piano
- Ian McLagan – keyboards
- Ernie Watts – saxophone

Technical

- Recorded by Bob Clearmountain and David Hewitt with the Record Plant Remote (New York)
- Mixed by Bob Clearmountain at Power Station Studios
- Front cover painting by Kazuhide Yamazaki
- Mastered by Bob Ludwig at Masterdisk (original LP and 1998 remastered CD)

== Charts ==
=== Weekly charts ===
Chart (1982)	Peak position
Australian Albums (Kent Music Report)	10
Austrian Albums (Ö3 Austria)	2
Canada Top Albums/CDs (RPM)	2
Dutch Albums (Album Top 100)	1
Finland (The Official Finnish Charts)	5
German Albums (Offizielle Top 100)	4
Italian Albums (Musica e Dischi)	16
Japanese Albums (Oricon)	14
New Zealand Albums (RMNZ)	6
Norwegian Albums (VG-lista)	3
Swedish Albums (Sverigetopplistan)	1
UK Albums (Official Charts)	4
US Billboard 200	5

=== Year-end charts ===
Chart (1982)	Position
German Albums (Offizielle Top 100)	40
New Zealand Albums (RMNZ)	39

== Certifications ==
Region	Certification	Certified units/sales
Australia (ARIA)	Gold	20,000^{^}
Canada (Music Canada)	Platinum	100,000^{^}
Japan (RIAJ)	Gold	100,000^{^}
Spain (Promusicae)	Gold	50,000^{^}
United Kingdom (BPI)	Gold	100,000^{^}
United States (RIAA)	Platinum	1,000,000^{^}
^{^} Shipments figures based on certification alone.

== See also ==
- Let's Spend the Night Together (film)
