= Neighbours (Rolling Stones song) =

Song by the Rolling Stones

from the album Tattoo You
- Released: 24 August 1981
- Recorded: June–July 1979, October–November 1980, April–June 1981
- Genre: Punk rock; hard rock
- Length: 3:31
- Label: Rolling Stones/Virgin
- Songwriter: Jagger/Richards
- Producer: The Glimmer Twins

Tattoo You track listing
- 11 tracks Side one: 1. "Start Me Up"; 2. "Hang Fire"; 3. "Slave"; 4. "Little T&A"; 5. "Black Limousine"; 6. "Neighbours"; Side two: 7. "Worried About You"; 8. "Tops"; 9. "Heaven"; 10. "No Use in Crying"; 11. "Waiting on a Friend"

"Neighbours" is a song recorded by the English rock band the Rolling Stones. Written by Mick Jagger and Keith Richards, it is an uptempo song featuring a saxophone part played by Sonny Rollins. The song was released 24 August 1981 by Rolling Stones Records and included as the sixth track on the band's 1981 studio album Tattoo You.

== Writing and recording ==
Jagger and Richards initially wrote "Neighbours" during the Emotional Rescue (1980) sessions in June–July 1979. It was further worked on by Jagger and Richards for Tattoo You in October 1979 and April–June 1981.

Jagger was inspired by Richards' own run-ins with his neighbours after the guitarist was evicted from his New York City apartment after complaints that he was playing music too loudly. On the story, Richards said at the time of release, "...Patti [Hansen] (Richards' wife) and I (have been evicted from apartments in New York). Mick wrote the lyrics to that - and he never has trouble with neighbours... I have a knack of finding a whole building of very cool people, you know, but there'll be one uncool couple... 'Neighbours' is the first song I think Mick's ever really written for me. It's one I wish I'd written, that."

Neighbours, do yourself a favour, Don't you mess with my baby when I'm working all night, You know that neighbours steal off of my table, Steal off of my table, ain't doing all right.

Recording took place during the June–July 1979 Emotional Rescue sessions, between October and November 1980, and April through June 1981, at Paris' Pathé Marconi Studios and Atlantic Studios in New York City. With Jagger on lead vocals, electric guitars are performed by Richards and Ronnie Wood, with Wood taking the solo. Charlie Watts and Bill Wyman perform drums and bass, respectively. Sonny Rollins also contributes saxophone, one of his three credits for the album. Ian Stewart performs the song's piano.

== Music video ==
The music video for "Neighbours" was directed by Michael Lindsay-Hogg. It was shot on 1 July 1981 at the Taft Hotel in New York City. Lindsay-Hogg took "considerable" inspiration from the set and suspenseful screenplay of the Alfred Hitchcock film Rear Window.

== Critical reception ==
Music critic Rob Sheffield wrote for Rolling Stone in an article reflecting on the life of Charlie Watts that "Neighbours" was a "great example of a fantastic song".

== Live performances ==
"Neighbours" was performed by the Stones throughout their 1981 and 1982 tours in support of Tattoo You, and was included on the concert film Let's Spend the Night Together (1983). It re-emerged for performances on the Stones' 2002–2003 Licks Tour, with one performance being captured and released on the 2004 album Live Licks. The song was again played at Croke Park, Dublin, Ireland, on 17 May 2018 on the No Filter Tour.

== Personnel ==
According to the 2021 reissue liner notes and the authors Philippe Margotin and Jean-Michel Guesdon.

The Rolling Stones

- Mick Jagger – lead vocals, rhythm guitar
- Keith Richards – rhythm guitar, backing vocals
- Ronnie Wood – rhythm and lead guitar
- Bill Wyman – bass guitar
- Charlie Watts – drums

Additional personnel

- Ian Stewart – piano
- Sonny Rollins – saxophone
- Jennifer McLean – backing vocals
- Susan McLean – backing vocals

Technical

- The Glimmer Twins – producers
- Chris Kimsey – associate producer, engineer
- Bob Clearmountain – engineer
- Gary Lyons – engineer
- Barry Sage – assistant engineer
