= Christian Piper =

German artist (1941–2019)

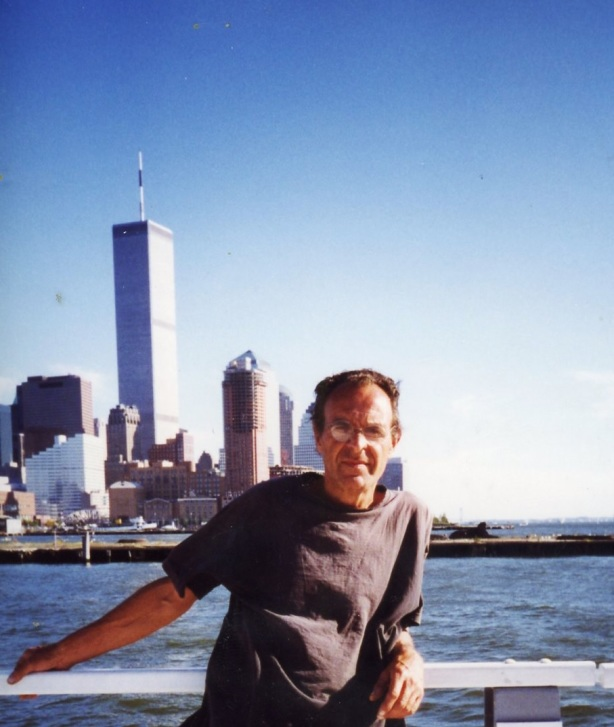
Christian Piper c. 1999, photograph by Simon Grome

Christian Piper (born 7 December 1941 in Oleśnica, Lower Silesia, Germany; died 2019 in Eisenach, Thuringia, Germany) was a German artist.

== Life ==
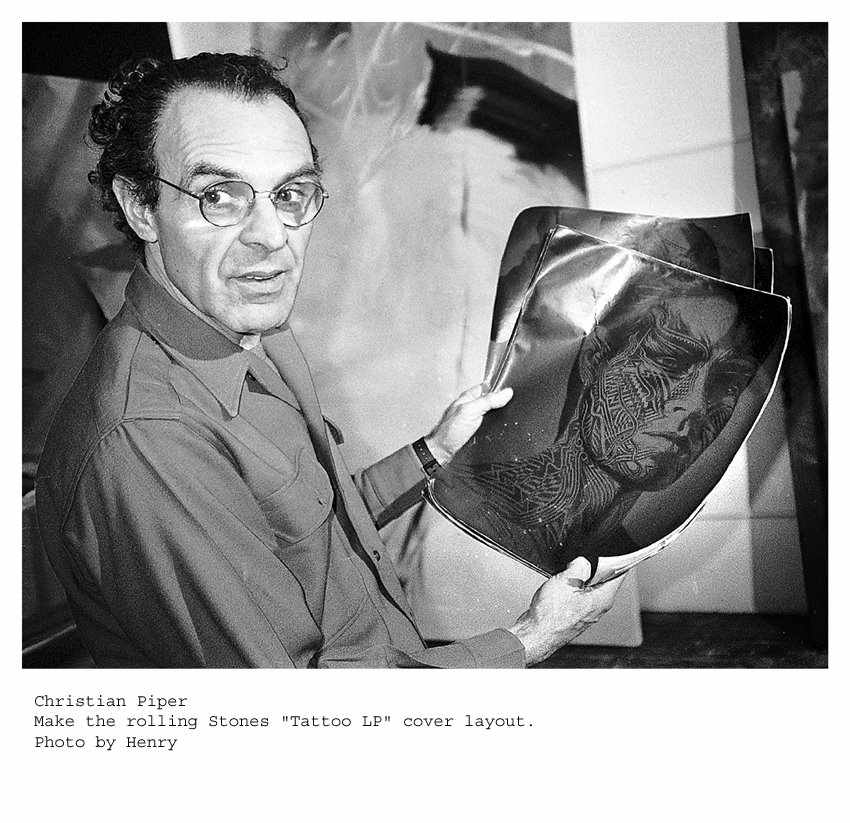
Christian Piper make the Rolling Stones LP Tattoo You cover layout

Piper studied art in Aachen together with Bauhaus students of Paul Klee and Johannes Itten as well as at the Folkwang Hochschule Essen Werden (BA Art 1970). In the 1970s he specialized in painting, went to New York, and became an assistant to Milton Glaser at Push Pin Studio, at that time one of the leading forces in graphic design and illustration. Piper soon worked for the New York Times, the New Yorker, and Vogue. He also designed and illustrated book and record covers, including several albums for The Rolling Stones, who received their first ever Grammy Award for the cover of Tattoo You in the category of Best Album Package with illustrations by Piper. Later he increasingly dedicated himself to fine art, producing sculptures and various series of drawings and paintings. In 2005 he returned to Germany, where he lived and worked in Berlin and Görlitz.

== Recognition ==
- 1971 Folkwang sponsorship award
- 1980 Gold Award Art Directors Club Chicago
- 1988 Century City Gallery, Los Angeles

== Exhibitions ==
- Century City Gallery, Los Angeles
- Hall of Fame, Minnesota
- Illustrator Guild, NYC
- Meru Art Gallery, Brooklyn
- Canal Pier, NYC: public installation stone collection West Side remnants
- 1999–2004: 20 ft. Sphinx installation with geomantic impact: head in juncture with Empire State Building to Statue of Liberty / New Jersey Tunnel in juncture to WT Center
- Manhattan Bridge Viaduct – Installation Habitat II
- Brooklyn Bridge – Installation Habitat IV
- 2016: Christian Piper – Just for Now, PRIVATEOFFSPACE

== Museums ==
- MoMA NYC
- Hall of Fame – Minnesota
- Rolling Stone Museum – San Francisco

== Literature ==
- Tina Sabel-Grau und Christian Piper: Bunter Regen – Nichts existiert so wie es erscheint. Mutterliebe.net, Stuttgart, 2020.
