= Tattoo You =

Studio album by the Rolling Stones
- Released: 24 August 1981
- Recorded: November and December 1972; January – March 1975; January – March 1978; January – October 1979; October 1980 – June 1981
- Genres: Rock; hard rock; rock and roll
- Length: 44:23
- Label: Rolling Stones
- Producer: The Glimmer Twins

The Rolling Stones chronology
| Sucking in the Seventies (1981) | Tattoo You (1981) | Still Life (1982) |

The Rolling Stones studio album chronology
| Emotional Rescue (1980) | Tattoo You (1981) | Undercover (1983) |

Singles from Tattoo You
- 1. "Start Me Up" Released: 14 August 1981; 2. "Waiting on a Friend" Released: November 1981; 3. "Hang Fire" Released: March 1982 (US)

Tattoo You is the sixteenth UK and eighteenth US studio album by the English rock band the Rolling Stones, released on 24 August 1981 by Rolling Stones Records. The album is mostly composed of studio outtakes recorded during the 1970s, and contains one of the band's best-known songs, "Start Me Up", which hit number two on the US Billboard singles charts.

A combination of touring obligations and personal feuding between band members made it difficult to arrange dedicated recording sessions for the band's follow-up to 1980's Emotional Rescue. As a result, the band's production team combed through unused recordings from prior sessions, some dating back almost a decade. While a few of the songs were used essentially as-is in their original form, most of these earlier recordings were not complete, consisting of song fragments requiring much work. Studio time was booked throughout 1980 and 1981 and band members came in when available to finish off the tracks.

The credited members of the Rolling Stones for the album were vocalist Mick Jagger, guitarists Keith Richards and Ronnie Wood, bassist Bill Wyman and drummer Charlie Watts while older tracks feature former Stones guitarist Mick Taylor ("Tops"), keyboardists Nicky Hopkins and Billy Preston, Black and Blue session guitarist Wayne Perkins ("Worried About You") and founding member Ian Stewart.

The album proved to be both a critical and commercial success upon release, reaching the top of the US Billboard 200. To date, it is the final Rolling Stones album to reach the top position of the US charts, concluding the band's string of eight consecutive number-one albums there, dating back to 1971's Sticky Fingers.

In 1989, it was ranked No. 34 on Rolling Stone magazine's list of the 100 greatest albums of the 1980s. In 2003, the album was ranked number 211 on Rolling Stone's list of the 500 Greatest Albums of All Time, then re-ranked number 213 in the 2012 revised list. Peter Corriston, who was responsible for the album cover's concept origination, art direction and design, won a Grammy Award in the category of Best Album Package.

A remastered 40th-anniversary edition of the album was released on 22 October 2021. It features nine previously unreleased tracks and a 1982 concert at Wembley Stadium.

== Background ==
Tattoo You is an album primarily composed of outtakes from previous recording sessions, some dating back a decade, with new vocals and overdubs. The Rolling Stones put together this collection to have a new album to promote for their worldwide American Tour 1981/European Tour 1982 beginning that September. Keith Richards commented in 1993:

"The thing with Tattoo You wasn't that we'd stopped writing new stuff, it was a question of time. We'd agreed we were going to go out on the road and we wanted to tour behind a record. There was no time to make a whole new album and make the start of the tour."

== Recording ==
The album's associate producer, Chris Kimsey, who had been associated with The Stones dating back to Sticky Fingers (1971) said, "Tattoo You really came about because Mick and Keith were going through a period of not getting on. There was a need to have an album out, and I told everyone I could make an album from what I knew was still there." He began sifting through the band's vaults: "I spent three months going through (the recording tapes from) like the last four, five albums finding stuff that had been either forgotten about or at the time rejected. And then I presented it to the band and I said, 'Hey, look guys, you've got all this great stuff sitting in the can and it's great material, do something with it.'"

Many of the songs consisted at this point of instrumental backing tracks for which vocals had not been recorded. Jagger said in a 1995 interview, "It wasn't all outtakes; some of it was old songs... I had to write lyrics and melodies. A lot of them didn't have anything, which is why they weren't used at the time – because they weren't complete. They were just bits, or they were from early takes". Despite the eclectic nature of the album, the Rolling Stones were able to divide Tattoo You into two distinct halves: a rock and roll side backed with one focusing on ballads.

The earliest songs used for Tattoo You are "Tops" and "Waiting on a Friend". The backing tracks for both songs were cut in late 1972 during the Goats Head Soup (1973) sessions with Mick Taylor and not Ronnie Wood. Taylor, who was not credited, later demanded and received a share of the album's royalties.

Dating from the Black and Blue sessions are the backing tracks for "Slave" and "Worried About You". They feature Billy Preston on keyboards and Ollie E. Brown on percussion. Wayne Perkins plays the lead guitar on "Worried About You".

The album opens with "Start Me Up", originally rehearsed under the working title "Never Stop" and as a reggae-influenced number in 1978 during the Some Girls sessions. The balance of it was recorded during these particular sessions in Paris (at Pathé Marconi studios), where the more rock-infused track was recorded. "Black Limousine" was also worked on during these sessions.

The basic tracks for "No Use in Crying", "Neighbours", "Heaven" and "Little T & A" came from the Emotional Rescue sessions.

"Hang Fire" was worked on in both the Some Girls and Emotional Rescue sessions.

The vocal parts for the songs on Tattoo You were overdubbed during sessions in October–November 1980 and April–June 1981. Jagger was the only member of the band present at some of these sessions. Other overdubs, such as Sonny Rollins' saxophone parts on "Slave" and "Waiting on a Friend", were also added at these sessions. The album was mixed at Atlantic Studios, Electric Lady Studios, Hit Factory and Power Station in New York City.

== Release and aftermath ==
"Start Me Up" was released in August 1981, just a week before Tattoo You, to a very strong response, reaching the top 10 in both the United States and UK, and number 1 in Australia. Widely considered one of the Stones' most infectious songs, it was enough to carry Tattoo You to No. 1 for nine weeks in the United States, while reaching No. 2 in the UK with solid sales. It has been certified 4× platinum in the United States alone. The critical reaction was positive, many feeling that Tattoo You was an improvement over Emotional Rescue and a high-quality release. "Waiting on a Friend" and "Hang Fire" became Top 20 US hits as well.

"Start Me Up" would prove to be The Rolling Stones' last single to reach as high as No. 2 in the US, while Tattoo You is their last American No. 1 album to date.

The album title was originally planned to be simply Tattoo. Jagger claims to this day that even he has no clue how the "You" became attached to the title. The title caused friction between Jagger and Richards, with Richards suspecting that Jagger had changed the title without seeking his input. The album cover for Tattoo You had concept origination, art direction and design by Peter Corriston and illustration by Christian Piper. The album cover won the Grammy Award in 1982 in the Best Album Package category. It was the first Grammy Award for the Rolling Stones.

There were several videos directed by Michael Lindsay-Hogg for this album including:

- "Start Me Up", "Hang Fire" and "Worried About You": Consisting of a standard band performance setting, miming to a backing tape.
- "Neighbours": An homage to Hitchcock's Rear Window, it features the band playing in one apartment of an apartment building with various happenings seen in the windows of the other apartments: A working-class couple relaxing and making love, a tai chi practitioner exercising, and most notoriously, a man putting bloody body parts in a suitcase. This video was heavily censored when presented on television.
- "Waiting on a Friend": Filmed on location in New York City's East Village, it consists of Richards walking down the street, meeting Jagger, who is sitting on the front steps of 96-98 St. Mark's Place (the same building used by the designer Peter Corriston for cover art of Led Zeppelin's 1975 album Physical Graffiti) with several other men, who shake Richards' hand. They then proceed down the street and enter a bar where the rest of the band is waiting. The video also features current-guitarist Wood, rather than Mick Taylor on guitar (similar to the videos for "Hot Stuff" and "Worried About You" in which Harvey Mandel and Wayne Perkins respectively actually played).

== Critical reception and legacy ==
Professional ratings
Review scores
| Source | Rating |
|---|---|
| AllMusic | 4.5/5 stars |
| The A.V. Club | favourable |
| Blender | 5/5 stars |
| Christgau's Record Guide: The '80s | A− |
| The Encyclopedia of Popular Music | 4/5 stars |
| Tom Hull | A− |
| Pitchfork | 8.1/10 |
| Rolling Stone | 5/5 stars |
| The Rolling Stone Album Guide | 4.5/5 stars |

Reviews for Tattoo You were largely positive, proclaiming the album a return to form and ranking among the Rolling Stones' finest works. Debra Rae Cohen commented in Rolling Stone: "Just when we might finally have lost patience, the new record dances (not prances), rocks (not jives) onto the scene, and the Rolling Stones are back again, with a matter-of-fact acceptance of their continued existence – and eventual mortality …"

Robert Palmer of The New York Times wrote that "remarkably, Tattoo You is something special...None of [the tracks] are Chuck Berry retreads, none of them are disco, and none of them are reggae – they are all rock-and-roll, with more than a hint of the soul and blues influences that were so important in the band's early work...The new album's lyrics are also a surprise. The Stones seem to have dropped the studied decadence that was their most characteristic pose throughout the 70's. The songs on Tattoo You seem to be by and about real people rather than larger-than-life caricatures."

Mark Moses, in The Boston Phoenix, said that the album "has its moments of gratuitous star-mongering, but more often you hear the Stones shirking that stardom. ... Moody, surprisingly impassioned, the Rolling Stones, archetypal bad boys (men?), are on Tattoo You less concerned with sounding merely tough than they have been in a long while; even their stock moves seem fresh, passionate."

Robert Christgau gave the album a good review but criticised "Start Me Up" in his Pazz and Jop essay in 1981, saying, "Its central conceit – Mick as sex machine, complete with pushbutton – explains why the album it starts up never transcends hand-tooled excellence except when Sonny Rollins, uncredited, invades the Stones' space. Though it's as good in its way as 'Street Fighting Man', how much you care about it depends entirely on how much you care about the Stones' technical difficulties."

Patty Rose, in Musician, said, "The feel of the album … is more one of rediscovered youth, of axes to play, not grind, of the latest cope, not dope. … The Stones have shed yet another layer of self-consciousness and their shiny vinyl new skin tingles with an open, early-decade kind of excitement."

Writing in Creem, Nick Tosches expressed contempt for what he felt was the Stones' gratuitous sexism and general negativity in their lyrics. After pointing out examples of what he considered misogyny in "Slave", "Little T+A", "Hang Fire" and even "Waiting on a Friend", he added: "Let it never be said that the Stones have a one-track mean streak. They are capable of singing for minutes on end without spewing venom at the target sex. 'Neighbours', for example, is quite catholic in its grimacing, directed as it is towards the whole family of man, with nary a mention of race, color or creed. 'No Use in Crying' contains the imperative phrase "Stay away from me," addressed to no one in particular, more times than I could count ...."

In a 2018 retrospective for The Guardian, music critic Alexis Petridis ranked Tattoo You as the band's thirteenth best album out of 23, stating that it "has no right to be as good as it is."

=== Album cover art ===
The album cover was designed by Peter Corriston and Hubert Kretzschmar. It featured close-up black and white photos of Mick Jagger and Keith Richards with tattoo illustrations on their faces. When asked why he didn't photograph the rest of the band, Kretzschmar explained,"It was a decision that Mick and Keith must have made. I remember Charlie was at the photo shoot with both of them, no effort was made to get him to pose or be part of it."

=== Accolades ===
In 1989, it was ranked No. 34 on Rolling Stone's list of the 100 greatest albums of the 1980s. In 2003, the album was ranked number 211 on Rolling Stone's list of The 500 Greatest Albums of All Time, then re-ranked number 213 in the 2012 revised list.

In 2000 it was voted number 759 in Colin Larkin's All Time Top 1000 Albums.

Peter Corriston, who was responsible for the album cover's concept origination, art direction and design, won a Grammy Award for Tattoo You in the category of best album package.

=== Band appraisal ===
In the 1995 Rolling Stone interview during which editor Jann Wenner called Tattoo You the Stones' "most underrated album", Jagger said, "I think it's excellent. But all the things I usually like, it doesn’t have. It doesn’t have any unity of purpose or place or time."

== Reissues ==
Tattoo You was remastered and reissued in 1994 by Virgin Records, and again in 2009 by Universal Music. It was released on SHM-SACD in 2011 by Universal Music Japan. The 1994 remaster was initially released in a Collector's Edition CD, which replicated in miniature elements of the original vinyl album packaging.

The 40th anniversary reissue of Tattoo You was released on 22 October 2021, with 9 unreleased tracks and a live album recorded at Wembley Stadium, London in 1982. The track "Living in the Heart of Love" was released on 19 August 2021.

== Track listing ==
All tracks are written by Mick Jagger and Keith Richards, except "Black Limousine" and "No Use in Crying" written with Ronnie Wood.

Side one
| No. | Title | Length |
|---|---|---|
| 1. | "Start Me Up" | 3:31 |
| 2. | "Hang Fire" | 2:20 |
| 3. | "Slave" | 4:55 |
| 4. | "Little T & A" | 3:23 |
| 5. | "Black Limousine" | 3:32 |
| 6. | "Neighbours" | 3:31 |

Side two
| No. | Title | Length |
|---|---|---|
| 7. | "Worried About You" | 5:16 |
| 8. | "Tops" | 3:45 |
| 9. | "Heaven" | 4:21 |
| 10. | "No Use in Crying" | 3:24 |
| 11. | "Waiting on a Friend" | 4:34 |

Note: "Slave" is 6:34 on newer pressings of the album.

=== 2021 Deluxe Edition ===
Disc two - Lost & Found: Rarities
| No. | Title | Writer(s) | Length |
|---|---|---|---|
| 1. | "Living in the Heart of Love" | | 4:13 |
| 2. | "Fiji Jim" | | 4:01 |
| 3. | "Troubles a' Comin'" | Eugene Record | 4:16 |
| 4. | "Shame, Shame, Shame" | Jimmy Reed | 4:14 |
| 5. | "Drift Away" | Mentor Williams | 4:07 |
| 6. | "It’s a Lie" | | 4:57 |
| 7. | "Come to the Ball" | | 3:41 |
| 8. | "Fast Talking, Slow Walking" | | 5:40 |
| 9. | "Start Me Up" (Early Version) | | 4:10 |

Disc three and four - Still Life – Wembley Stadium 1982
| No. | Title | Writer(s) | Length |
|---|---|---|---|
| 1. | "Under My Thumb" | | 3:51 |
| 2. | "When the Whip Comes Down" | | 4:34 |
| 3. | "Let's Spend the Night Together" | | 4:22 |
| 4. | "Shattered" | | 4:41 |
| 5. | "Neighbours" | | 4:10 |
| 6. | "Black Limousine" | Jagger, Richards, Wood | 3:51 |
| 7. | "Just My Imagination (Running Away with Me)" | Norman Whitfield; Barrett Strong | 9:32 |
| 8. | "Twenty Flight Rock" | Eddie Cochran, Ned Fairchild | 1:46 |
| 9. | "Going to a Go Go" | Smokey Robinson, Pete Moore, Bobby Rogers, Marv Tarplin | 3:40 |
| 10. | "Chantilly Lace" | J. P. Richardson | 4:12 |
| 11. | "Let Me Go" | | 4:06 |
| 12. | "Time Is on My Side" | Jerry Ragovoy, Jimmy Norman | 3:51 |
| 13. | "Beast of Burden" | | 7:23 |
| 14. | "Let It Bleed" | | 6:00 |
| 15. | "You Can't Always Get What You Want" | | 10:48 |
| 16. | "Band Introductions" | | 1:24 |
| 17. | "Little T & A" | | 3:21 |
| 18. | "Tumbling Dice" | | 4:27 |
| 19. | "She's So Cold" | | 4:11 |
| 20. | "Hang Fire" | | 2:27 |
| 21. | "Miss You" | | 7:49 |
| 22. | "Honky Tonk Women" | | 3:31 |
| 23. | "Brown Sugar" | | 3:24 |
| 24. | "Start Me Up" | | 4:40 |
| 25. | "Jumpin' Jack Flash" | | 6:02 |
| 26. | "(I Can't Get No) Satisfaction" | | 6:02 |

== Personnel ==
- Track numbers noted in parentheses below are based on the CD track numbering.

The Rolling Stones

- Mick Jagger – lead vocals (all but 4), backing vocals (all but 5); electric guitar (9 & 10); percussion (track 9); electric piano (track 7)
- Keith Richards – electric guitar (all but 9), backing vocals (2–4, 6-7 & 10); lead vocals and bass guitar (track 4)
- Ronnie Wood – electric guitar (1–2, 4–6, 10), backing vocals (2, 4, 6 & 10)
- Bill Wyman – bass guitar (all but 4); guitars, synthesizer and percussion (track 9)
- Charlie Watts – drums
- Mick Taylor – electric guitar (8, 11)

Additional personnel

- Nicky Hopkins – piano (8, 10 & 11); organ (10)
- Ian Stewart – piano (2 & 4–6)
- Billy Preston – keyboards (3 & 7)
- Wayne Perkins – electric lead guitar (7)
- Ollie E. Brown – percussion (3 & 7)
- Pete Townshend – backing vocals (3)
- Sonny Rollins – saxophone (3, 6 & 11)
- Jimmy Miller – percussion (8)
- Michael Carabello – cowbell (1); conga (3); güiro, claves, cabasa and conga (11)
- Chris Kimsey – electric piano (9)
- Barry Sage – handclaps (1)
- Sugar Blue – harmonica (5)

Technical

- Chris Kimsey – associate producer, engineer
- Barry Sage, Alex Vertikoff, Keith Harwood, Glyn Johns, Andy Johns, Dave Richards, Tapani Tapanainen, Sean Fullan, Brad Samuelsohn, Ron "Snake" Reynolds, Jon Smith, Reinhold Mack, Carlton Lee, Mikey Chung – uncredited engineers
- Bob Clearmountain – mixing
- Bob Ludwig – mastering at Masterdisk
- Greg Calbi – 1986 CD mastering at Sterling Sound
- Bob Ludwig – 1994 remastering at Gateway Mastering
- Stephen Marcussen, Stewart Whitmore – 2009 and 2021 remastering at Marcussen Mastering

== Charts ==
=== Weekly charts ===
1980 weekly chart performance for Tattoo You
| Chart (1981–1982) | Peak position |
|---|---|
| Australian Albums (Kent Music Report) | 1 |
| Austrian Albums (Ö3 Austria) | 2 |
| Canada Top Albums/CDs (RPM) | 1 |
| Dutch Albums (Album Top 100) | 1 |
| Finland (The Official Finnish Charts) | 7 |
| German Albums (Offizielle Top 100) | 3 |
| Italian Albums (Musica e Dischi) | 3 |
| Japanese Albums (Oricon) | 8 |
| New Zealand Albums (RMNZ) | 1 |
| Norwegian Albums (VG-lista) | 3 |
| Spanish Albums (PROMUSICAE) | 2 |
| Swedish Albums (Sverigetopplistan) | 3 |
| UK Albums (Official Charts) | 2 |
| US Billboard 200 | 1 |

2021 weekly chart performance
| Chart (2021) | Position |
|---|---|
| Belgian Albums (Ultratop Flanders) | 10 |
| Belgian Albums (Ultratop Wallonia) | 15 |
| Czech Albums (ČNS IFPI) | 87 |
| Finnish Albums (Suomen virallinen lista) | 24 |
| Portuguese Albums (AFP) | 23 |
| Swiss Albums (Schweizer Hitparade) | 8 |

=== Year-end charts ===
1981 year-end chart performance
| Chart (1981) | Position |
|---|---|
| Australian Albums Chart | 12 |
| Canadian Albums Chart | 5 |
| Dutch Albums Chart | 22 |
| French Albums Chart | 40 |
| New Zealand Albums (RMNZ) | 16 |
| UK Albums Chart | 35 |
| US Billboard 200 | 22 |

1982 year-end chart performance
| Chart (1982) | Position |
|---|---|
| Australian Albums Chart | 20 |
| Canadian Albums Chart | 51 |
| Dutch Albums Chart | 72 |
| New Zealand Albums (RMNZ) | 18 |
| US Billboard 200 | 11 |

== Certifications and sales ==
Certifications and sales for Tattoo You
| Region | Certification | Certified units/sales |
|---|---|---|
| Australia (ARIA) | 2× Platinum | 225,000 |
| Canada (Music Canada) | 4× Platinum | 400,000^{^} |
| France (SNEP) | Gold | 100,000^{*} |
| Japan (RIAJ) | Gold | 100,000^{^} |
| Netherlands (NVPI) | Gold | 50,000^{^} |
| New Zealand (RMNZ) | Platinum | 15,000^{^} |
| Spain (Promusicae) | Gold | 50,000^{^} |
| Sweden (GLF) | Gold | 50,000^{^} |
| United Kingdom (BPI) | Gold | 100,000^{^} |
| United States (RIAA) | 4× Platinum | 4,000,000^{^} |
| Yugoslavia | — | 50,000 |
^{*} Sales figures based on certification alone.^{^} Shipments figures based on certification alone.
