= Waiting on a Friend =

Single by the Rolling Stones

from the album Tattoo You
- B-side: "Little T&A"
- Released: November 1981
- Recorded: 1972/1973 and 1981
- Genre: Pop
- Length: 4:35
- Label: Rolling Stones
- Songwriter: Jagger/Richards
- Producer: The Glimmer Twins

The Rolling Stones singles chronology
"Start Me Up" (1981)	"Waiting on a Friend" (1981)	"Hang Fire" (1982)

Music video
- "Waiting on a Friend” on YouTube

Tattoo You track listing
- 11 tracks Side one: 1. "Start Me Up"; 2. "Hang Fire"; 3. "Slave"; 4. "Little T&A"; 5. "Black Limousine"; 6. "Neighbours"; Side two: 7. "Worried About You"; 8. "Tops"; 9. "Heaven"; 10. "No Use in Crying"; 11. "Waiting on a Friend"

"Waiting on a Friend" is a song by the English rock band the Rolling Stones from their 1981 album Tattoo You. Written by Mick Jagger and Keith Richards and released as the album's second single, it reached No. 13 on the Billboard Hot 100 singles chart in the US.

== History ==
Recording of "Waiting on a Friend" (as 'Waiting for a Friend') began in late 1972 through early 1973 in Kingston, Jamaica, during the Goats Head Soup sessions. In the liner notes to 1993's compilation album Jump Back, Mick Jagger said, "We all liked it at the time but it didn't have any lyrics, so there we were... The lyric I added is very gentle and loving, about friendships in the band." Jagger also had stated that the 1981 lyrics were contemplated for a future possible video, making the song the first Rolling Stones single to be packaged as a possible video for the emerging MTV channel.

The lyrics see a more mature side of singer Jagger represented. He speaks of setting aside women and vices in favor of making some sense of his life and finding the virtues inherent in true friendship:

Don't need a whore, I don't need no booze, don't need a virgin priest. But I need someone I can cry to, I need someone to protect.

The song is noted for its dreamy qualities brought on by the soft guitars, smooth rhythm, and Jagger's lilting refrain of "doo-doo-doo". Veteran Stones collaborator Nicky Hopkins performs the track's running piano. The Stones hired jazz saxophonist Sonny Rollins to perform the solo on this song, as well as two other songs on the album. On his contribution to the track, Jagger said in 1985:

I had a lot of trepidation about working with Sonny Rollins. This guy's a giant of the saxophone. Charlie said, 'He's never going to want to play on a Rolling Stones record!' I said, 'Yes he is going to want to.' And he did and he was wonderful. I said, 'Would you like me to stay out there in the studio?' He said, 'Yeah, you tell me where you want me to play and DANCE the part out.' So I did that. And that's very important: communication in hand, dance, whatever. You don't have to do a whole ballet, but sometimes that movement of the shoulder tells the guy to kick in on the beat.

Additional percussion, comprising claves, cabasa, güiro and conga, by Michael Carabello, was added during overdub sessions in April and June 1981, as well as acoustic guitar by Jagger.

== Music video ==
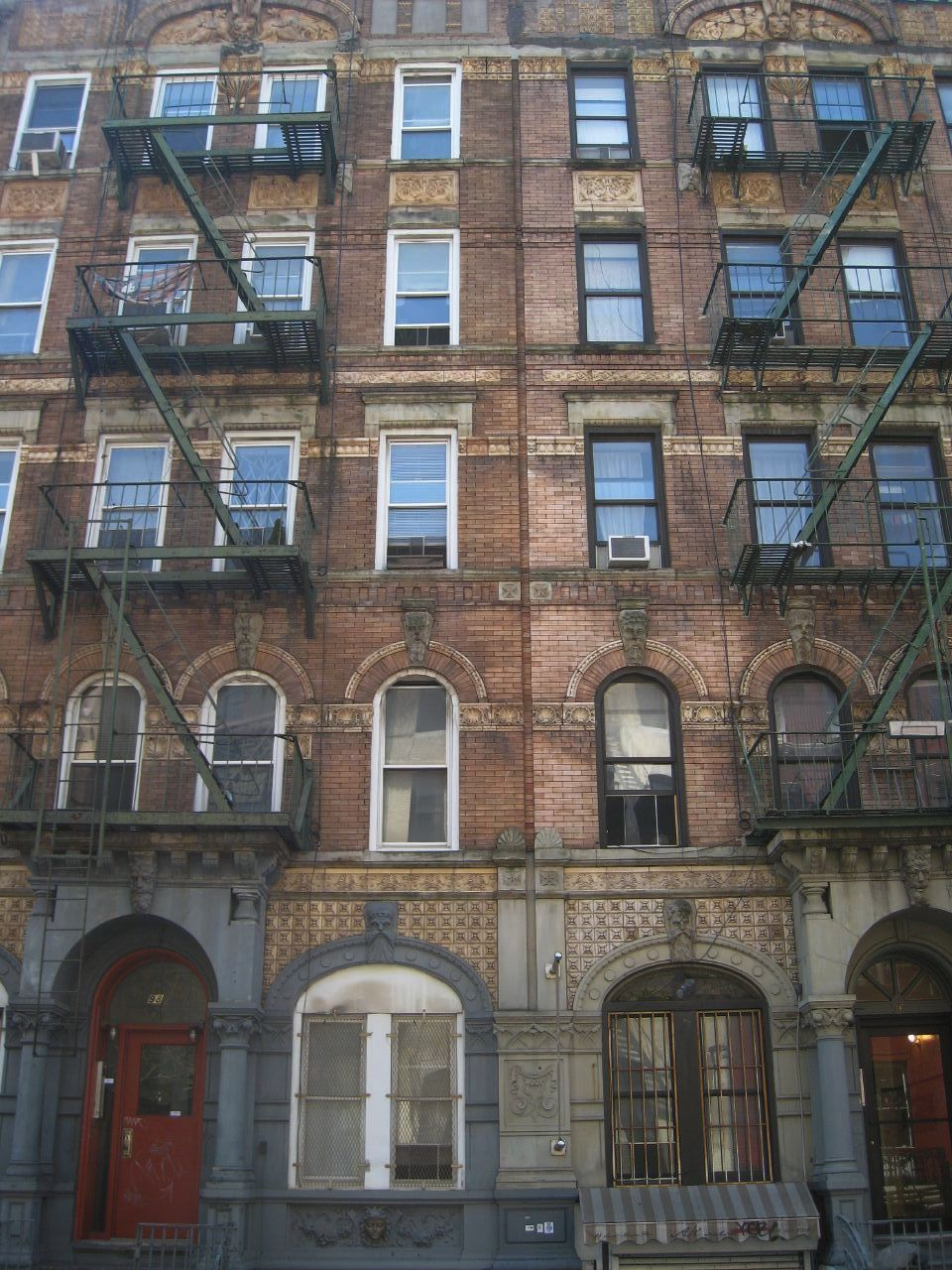
96–98 St. Mark's Place

The video, shot on 2 July 1981, directed by Michael Lindsay-Hogg (who also directed their 1968 special The Rolling Stones Rock and Roll Circus), became very popular on MTV. Matching the song's lyrics, Jagger is seen waiting for Keith Richards in the doorway of an apartment block. The building, at 96–98 St. Mark's Place in Manhattan, is notable for having also appeared on the cover of Led Zeppelin's 1975 album Physical Graffiti. The two then walk down the street and enter the St. Mark's Bar & Grill where the other three band members are already drinking. Ronnie Wood appears in the video, although he was not a musician on the original recording. Jagger sings the song to Richards and the video concludes with the band setting up for a gig at the back of the bar, largely ignored by the other patrons.

== Release ==
Released as the second single after "Start Me Up", "Waiting on a Friend" became a radio staple in the US, where it reached No. 13 on the singles chart in early 1982. It did not fare as well in Europe, reaching a modest No. 50 on the UK Singles Chart but as high as No. 9 in the Netherlands.

Billboard called it a "ballad that has a subtle honky tonk feeling" and a "tasty contrast" to the Rolling Stones' previous single "Start Me Up". Record World said that "Jagger's magnetíc vocal, Sonny Rollins sax phrases and the hypnotic chorus make this one of the Stones most enticing pieces in recent memory."

"Waiting on a Friend" was included on the Stones' compilation albums Rewind (1971–1984) (1984), Jump Back (1993), and GRRR! (2012). A 1981 live performance of the song featured on the concert film Let's Spend the Night Together (1983). A 1997 performance with saxophonist Joshua Redman was recorded during the Bridges to Babylon Tour and released in 1998 on the live album No Security and the concert film Bridges to Babylon Tour '97–98.

== Personnel ==
According to the 2021 reissue liner notes and the authors Philippe Margotin and Jean-Michel Guesdon.

The Rolling Stones

- Mick Jagger – lead and backing vocals
- Keith Richards – rhythm guitar, acoustic guitar, backing vocals
- Bill Wyman – bass guitar
- Charlie Watts – drums

Additional musicians

- Nicky Hopkins – piano
- Sonny Rollins – saxophone
- Michael Carabello – percussion

Technical

- The Glimmer Twins – producers
- Chris Kimsey – associate producer, engineer
- Andy Johns – engineer
- Bob Clearmountain – engineer
- Gary Lyons – engineer
- Barry Sage – assistant engineer

Note: The 2021 reissue liner notes list Jagger on guitar and Billy Preston on keyboards. Mick Taylor also played guitar during the 1972 sessions.

== Charts ==
Chart (1981–1982)	Peak position
Australia (Kent Music Report)	44
Belgium (Ultratop 50 Flanders)	15
Canadá (CHUM Chart).	1
Canada RPM Top Singles	10
Finland (Soumen Virallinen)	28
Netherlands (Single Top 100)	17
UK Singles (Official Charts)	50
US Billboard Hot 100	13
US Mainstream Rock	8

Year-end chart (1982)	Rank
US Top Pop Singles (Billboard)	94

== Certifications ==
Region	Certification	Certified units/sales
Australia (ARIA)	Gold	35,000^{‡}
^{‡} Sales+streaming figures based on certification alone.
