= Worried About You =

Song by the Rolling Stones

from the album Tattoo You
- Released: 24 August 1981
- Recorded: December 1974, January – February 1975 and January to June 1981
- Genre: Soul
- Length: 5:17
- Label: Rolling Stones/Virgin
- Songwriter: Jagger/Richards
- Producer: The Glimmer Twins

Tattoo You track listing
- 11 tracks Side one: 1. "Start Me Up"; 2. "Hang Fire"; 3. "Slave"; 4. "Little T&A"; 5. "Black Limousine"; 6. "Neighbours"; Side two: 7. "Worried About You"; 8. "Tops"; 9. "Heaven"; 10. "No Use in Crying"; 11. "Waiting on a Friend"

"Worried About You" is a song featured on the 1981 the Rolling Stones album Tattoo You.

Written by Mick Jagger and Keith Richards, "Worried About You" is a slow ballad first produced for 1976's Black and Blue. This is most evident with the song's guitar solo contributed by Wayne Perkins, an early contender for the lead guitarist spot left open after the departure of Mick Taylor. Like some songs for Black and Blue, "Worried About You" was recorded in Rotterdam, Netherlands, using the Rolling Stones Mobile Studio. Overdubs were performed in Montreux, Switzerland, as well as vocals in 1981 in New York City.

With Mick Jagger on electric piano and lead vocals (using a falsetto voice like the ones he employs in the earlier released, later recorded songs "Fool to Cry" and "Emotional Rescue") with Richards providing prominent harmony vocals during the chorus, Perkins and Richards perform guitars. Charlie Watts and Bill Wyman perform drums and bass, respectively.

A simple performance music video was produced in support of the song. The song was billed as "Worried 'Bout You" in the video. It is notable for showing Ronnie Wood, the eventual choice for the Stones' lead guitarist, performing Perkins' solo (similar to the videos for "Waiting on a Friend" and "Hot Stuff", which were actually played by Mick Taylor and Harvey Mandel, respectively).

The song was first performed by the Stones during the two shows at the "El Mocambo Club" in Canada, March 4–5, 1977. It was also played throughout the 2002–03 Licks Tour, with one captured performance being released on the 2004 live album Live Licks. It would again be performed during the 2006 leg of the A Bigger Bang Tour and in 2013 during the 50 & Counting... Tour. During concerts, the keyboard parts are performed by Jagger and Chuck Leavell.

The song was featured in "Mars vs. Mars", an episode of the television series Veronica Mars.

== Personnel ==
According to the 2021 reissue liner notes and the authors Philippe Margotin and Jean-Michel Guesdon.

The Rolling Stones

- Mick Jagger – lead vocals, electric piano, rhythm guitar
- Keith Richards – rhythm guitar, backing vocals
- Bill Wyman – bass guitar
- Charlie Watts – drums

Additional personnel

- Wayne Perkins – lead guitar
- Billy Preston – keyboards
- Ollie E. Brown – percussion

Technical

- The Glimmer Twins – producers
- Chris Kimsey – associate producer, engineer
- Bob Clearmountain – engineer
- Gary Lyons – engineer
- Barry Sage – assistant engineer
