= Hang Fire =

Single by The Rolling Stones

from the album Tattoo You
- B-side: "Neighbours"
- Released: March 1982 (US)
- Recorded: 1978–1979 (basic track), 1981 (overdubs)
- Genre: Rock and roll; doo-wop
- Length: 2:22
- Label: Rolling Stones
- Songwriter: Jagger/Richards
- Producer: The Glimmer Twins

The Rolling Stones singles chronology
"Waiting on a Friend" (1981)	"Hang Fire" (1982)	"Going to a Go-Go" (1982)

Tattoo You track listing
- 11 tracks Side one: 1. "Start Me Up"; 2. "Hang Fire"; 3. "Slave"; 4. "Little T&A"; 5. "Black Limousine"; 6. "Neighbours"; Side two: 7. "Worried About You"; 8. "Tops"; 9. "Heaven"; 10. "No Use in Crying"; 11. "Waiting on a Friend"

"Hang Fire" is a song by the English rock and roll band the Rolling Stones from their 1981 album Tattoo You. It was written by Mick Jagger and Keith Richards.

Richards was asked about the track in a 1981 Rolling Stone magazine interview where he states that the track relates to England and the "ugly politicians" who, he said, had caused the country to decline when the "money got tight".

Billboard called it "an effervescent rocker". Record World called it "no-nonsense rock n' roll, sweetened by a falsetto chorus" and commented on "Keith Richards' economical guitar break and the hot hook."

The title expression "hang fire" (by formal definition) means to do nothing, to delay, wait, hold back, or hesitate. The phrase originally denoted the instance when a gun, using an antique type of ignition such as percussion cap, or flintlock, would fail or markedly delay to fire when the trigger was pulled.

"Hang Fire" was first written and recorded during the Some Girls sessions in Paris. Released as the third single from Tattoo You, the song became a radio hit in the US, where it reached No. 20 on the singles chart and #2 on the Top Rock Tracks chart. The song was played heavily on the Stones' tours of 1981 and 1982, but has not been played since. Its B-side, "Neighbours", would become an airplay hit and a video was also made for the song.

== Personnel ==
According to the 2021 reissue liner notes and the authors Philippe Margotin and Jean-Michel Guesdon.

The Rolling Stones

- Mick Jagger – lead and backing vocals
- Keith Richards – lead guitar
- Ronnie Wood – bass guitar
- Charlie Watts – drums

Additional personnel

- Ian Stewart – piano

Technical

- The Glimmer Twins – producers
- Chris Kimsey – associate producer, engineer
- Bob Clearmountain – engineer
- Gary Lyons – engineer
- Barry Sage – assistant engineer

Note: Margotin and Guesdon are unsure if Jagger played rhythm guitar and if Wood played bass.

== Uses in popular culture ==
"Hang Fire" is heard in edited form in the 2010 movie The Bounty Hunter.
