= Licks Tour =

2002–03 concert tour by the Rolling Stones

Licks Tour 2002–2003
- Tour by The Rolling Stones
- Location: Asia; Europe; North America; Oceania
- Associated album: Forty Licks
- Start date: 3 September 2002
- End date: 9 November 2003
- Legs: 5
- No. of shows: 117
- Box office: US$311 million ($544.31 in 2025 dollars)

The Rolling Stones concert chronology
- No Security Tour (1999); Licks Tour (2002–03); A Bigger Bang Tour (2005–07)

The Licks Tour was a worldwide concert tour undertaken by the Rolling Stones during 2002 and 2003, in support of their 40th anniversary compilation album Forty Licks. The tour grossed over $300 million, becoming the second-highest-grossing tour at that time, behind their own Voodoo Lounge Tour of 1994–1995. The tour yielded the releases Live Licks in 2004 from four different nights, Licked Live in NYC in 2022 from the January 18 show of 2003, and Live at the Wiltern in 2024 from the November 4 show of 2002.

== Background ==
The itinerary continued the Rolling Stones' practice of mixing theatre, arena, and stadium venues. With little new music to promote, set lists were dynamic and featured a total of 80 different songs.

The production was designed by Mark Fisher, Charlie Watts, Mick Jagger, and Patrick Woodroffe. The design included a 60-metre (200 ft) wide digital print created by Jeff Koons and film sequences directed by Willie Williams. During the song "Honky Tonk Women", an animated video was shown of a topless woman riding the famous Rolling Stones Tongue logo before being devoured.

Planned dates in East Asia and the final date of the tour were cancelled in response to the SARS outbreak of 2002–2003. Additionally, because Toronto, Ontario, Canada was also affected, the Rolling Stones headlined the Molson Canadian Rocks for Toronto concert on 30 July 2003 to help the city recover from the effects of the epidemic. It was attended by an estimated 490,000 people. Finally, on 7–9 November 2003, the band played its first ever concerts in Hong Kong, as part of the Harbour Fest celebration. The tour was sponsored by E-Trade.

In Chicago, U2 frontman Bono joined the Stones for "It's Only Rock 'n Roll (But I Like It)" while Dr. John guested on piano during "I Just Want to Make Love to You."

In January, American cable network HBO broadcast a concert from Madison Square Garden in New York.

In Sydney, Leipzig, Hockenheim, Oberhausen and Toronto, Angus and Malcolm Young from AC/DC played "Rock Me Baby" with the Rolling Stones. The Leipzig performance can be found on disc 2 of AC/DC's Plug Me In, while the Toronto performance was included in the Toronto Rocks DVD.

== Set list ==
Typical set list

1. "Brown Sugar"
2. "It's Only Rock 'n Roll (But I Like It)"
3. "Start Me Up"
4. "Don't Stop"
5. "Tumbling Dice"
6. "Angie"
7. "You Can't Always Get What You Want"
8. "Midnight Rambler"
9. "Monkey Man"
10. "Love Train"
11. "Little Queenie"
12. "Slipping Away"
13. "Happy"
14. "Sympathy for the Devil"
15. "You Got Me Rocking"
16. "When the Whip Comes Down"
17. "Miss You"
18. "Gimme Shelter"
19. "Honky Tonk Women"
20. "Street Fighting Man"
21. "Jumpin' Jack Flash"
  Encore
22. "(I Can't Get No) Satisfaction"

Set list on 4 November 2002 at Wiltern Theatre, Los Angeles, CA

1. "Jumpin' Jack Flash"
2. "Live with Me"
3. "Neighbours"
4. "Hand of Fate"
5. "No Expectations"
6. "Beast of Burden"
7. "Stray Cat Blues"
8. "Dance (Pt. 1)"
9. "Everybody Needs Somebody to Love" (with Solomon Burke)
10. "That's How Strong My Love Is"
11. "Going to a Go-Go"
12. "Thru and Thru"
13. "You Don't Have to Mean It"
14. "Can't You Hear Me Knocking"
15. "Rock Me Baby"
16. "Bitch"
17. "Honky Tonk Women"
18. "Start Me Up"
19. "Brown Sugar"
  Encore
20. "Tumbling Dice"

== Tour dates ==
List of 2002 concerts
| Date | City | Country | Venue | Opening act(s) |
|---|---|---|---|---|
| 16 August 2002 (Note: On 16 August 2002 in Toronto, Ontario, Canada, the Rolling Stones performed a surprise gig (in front of 1,000 lucky fans) with an unusual setlist: "It's Only Rock 'n Roll (But I Like It)", "Sad Sad Sad", "If You Can't Rock Me", "Stray Cat Blues", "Hot Stuff", "Don't Stop", "Honky Tonk Women", "Torn and Frayed", "Wild Horses", "Happy", "I Can't Turn You Loose", "Heart Of Stone", "Can't You Hear Me Knocking", "Jumpin' Jack Flash", encore: "Brown Sugar".) | Toronto | Canada | Palais Royale | Danko Jones |
| 3 September 2002 | Boston | United States | FleetCenter | The Pretenders |
| 5 September 2002 | Foxboro | United States | Gillette Stadium | The Pretenders |
| 8 September 2002 | Boston | United States | Orpheum Theatre | Buddy Guy |
| 10 September 2002 | Chicago | United States | United Center | The Pretenders |
| 13 September 2002 | Chicago | United States | Comiskey Park | The Pretenders |
| 16 September 2002 | Chicago | United States | Aragon Ballroom | Dr. John |
| 18 September 2002 | Philadelphia | United States | Veterans Stadium | The Pretenders |
| 20 September 2002 | Philadelphia | United States | First Union Center | The Pretenders |
| 22 September 2002 | Upper Darby | United States | Tower Theater | —N/a |
| 26 September 2002 | New York City | United States | Madison Square Garden | The Pretenders |
| 28 September 2002 | East Rutherford | United States | Giants Stadium | The Pretenders |
| 30 September 2002 | New York City | United States | Roseland Ballroom | Jonny Lang |
| 4 October 2002 | Landover | United States | FedExField | The Strokes |
| 5 October 2002 | Hartford | United States | Hartford Civic Center | The Strokes |
| 12 October 2002 | Detroit | United States | Ford Field | No Doubt |
| 14 October 2002 | Cleveland | United States | Gund Arena | Elvis Costello |
| 16 October 2002 | Toronto | Canada | Air Canada Centre | The White Stripes |
| 18 October 2002 | Toronto | Canada | SkyDome | No Doubt |
| 20 October 2002 | Columbus | United States | Nationwide Arena | The White Stripes |
| 22 October 2002 | Sunrise | United States | Office Depot Center | Shaggy |
| 23 October 2002 | Miami | United States | American Airlines Arena | Shaggy |
| 26 October 2002 | Atlanta | United States | Turner Field | No Doubt |
| 31 October 2002 | Los Angeles | United States | Staples Center | Sheryl Crow |
| 2 November 2002 | Anaheim | United States | Edison International Field | Sheryl Crow |
| 4 November 2002 | Los Angeles | United States | Wiltern Theatre | Solomon Burke |
| 6 November 2002 | Tacoma | United States | Tacoma Dome | Sheryl Crow |
| 8 November 2002 | San Francisco | United States | Pacific Bell Park | Sheryl Crow |
| 9 November 2002 | San Francisco | United States | Pacific Bell Park | Sheryl Crow |
| 12 November 2002 | Oakland | United States | The Arena in Oakland | Sheryl Crow |
| 14 November 2002 | San Diego | United States | San Diego Sports Arena | Sheryl Crow |
| 16 November 2002 | Las Vegas | United States | The Joint (Private show hosted by David Bonderman – no public admission) | John Mellencamp |
| 23 November 2002 | San Antonio | United States | SBC Center | Lifehouse |
| 25 November 2002 | Nashville | United States | Gaylord Entertainment Center | Lifehouse |
| 29 November 2002 | Las Vegas | United States | The Joint | Solomon Burke |
| 30 November 2002 | Las Vegas | United States | MGM Grand Garden Arena | Lifehouse |

List of 2003 concerts
| Date | City | Country | Venue | Opening act(s) |
|---|---|---|---|---|
| 8 January 2003 | Montreal | Canada | Bell Centre | Les Respectables |
| 10 January 2003 | Pittsburgh | United States | Mellon Arena | Ryan Adams |
| 12 January 2003 | Boston | United States | FleetCenter | Ryan Adams |
| 16 January 2003 | New York City | United States | Madison Square Garden | Ryan Adams |
| 18 January 2003 | New York City | United States | Madison Square Garden | Ryan Adams (The Stones broadcast live on HBO Tonight) |
| 21 January 2003 | Chicago | United States | United Center | Ryan Adams |
| 22 January 2003 | Chicago | United States | United Center | Ryan Adams |
| 25 January 2003 | Houston | United States | Reliant Stadium | Ryan Adams |
| 28 January 2003 | Oklahoma City | United States | Ford Center | Ryan Adams |
| 30 January 2003 | Phoenix | United States | America West Arena | Jonny Lang |
| 1 February 2003 | Denver | United States | Pepsi Center | Jonny Lang |
| 4 February 2003 | San Jose | United States | HP Pavilion at San Jose | Susan Tedeschi |
| 6 February 2003 | Los Angeles | United States | Staples Center | Susan Tedeschi |
| 8 February 2003 | Las Vegas | United States | MGM Grand Garden Arena | Susan Tedeschi |
| 18 February 2003 | Sydney | Australia | Enmore Theatre | Jet |
| 20 February 2003 | Sydney | Australia | Sydney Super Dome | Jet |
| 22 February 2003 | Sydney | Australia | Sydney Super Dome | Jet |
| 25 February 2003 | Melbourne | Australia | Rod Laver Arena | Jet |
| 27 February 2003 | Melbourne | Australia | Rod Laver Arena | Jet |
| 1 March 2003 | Melbourne | Australia | Rod Laver Arena | Jet |
| 4 March 2003 | Brisbane | Australia | Brisbane Entertainment Centre | —N/a |
| 5 March 2003 | Brisbane | Australia | Brisbane Entertainment Centre | —N/a |
| 10 March 2003 | Tokyo | Japan | Nippon Budokan | —N/a |
| 12 March 2003 | Yokohama | Japan | Yokohama Arena | —N/a |
| 15 March 2003 | Tokyo | Japan | Tokyo Dome | —N/a |
| 16 March 2003 | Tokyo | Japan | Tokyo Dome | —N/a |
| 20 March 2003 | Osaka | Japan | Osaka Dome | —N/a |
| 21 March 2003 | Osaka | Japan | Osaka Dome | —N/a |
| 24 March 2003 | Singapore | | Singapore Indoor Stadium | —N/a |
| 26 March 2003 | Singapore | | Singapore Indoor Stadium | —N/a |
| 4 April 2003 | Bangalore | India | Palace Grounds | —N/a |
| 7 April 2003 | Mumbai | India | Brabourne Stadium | —N/a |
| 4 June 2003 | Munich | Germany | Olympiahalle | The Cranberries |
| 6 June 2003 | Munich | Germany | Olympiastadion | The Cranberries |
| 8 June 2003 | Munich | Germany | Circus Krone Bau | —N/a |
| 10 June 2003 | Milan | Italy | Stadio Giuseppe Meazza | The Cranberries |
| 13 June 2003 | Oberhausen | Germany | O-Vision Zukunftspark | AC/DC; The Cranberries |
| 15 June 2003 | Berlin | Germany | Olympiastadion | The Cranberries |
| 18 June 2003 | Vienna | Austria | Ernst Happel Stadion | The Cranberries |
| 20 June 2003 | Leipzig | Germany | Festwiese | AC/DC |
| 22 June 2003 | Hockenheim | Germany | Hockenheimring | AC/DC; The Pretenders |
| 25 June 2003 | Bilbao | Spain | Estadio San Mames | —N/a |
| 27 June 2003 | Madrid | Spain | Estadio Vicente Calderón | —N/a |
| 29 June 2003 | Barcelona | Spain | Estadi Olímpic de Montjuïc | —N/a |
| 5 July 2003 | Marseille | France | Stade Vélodrome | —N/a |
| 7 July 2003 | Paris | France | Palais omnisports de Paris-Bercy | —N/a |
| 9 July 2003 | Saint-Denis | France | Stade de France | —N/a |
| 11 July 2003 | Paris | France | L’Olympia | —N/a |
| 13 July 2003 | Copenhagen | Denmark | Parken Stadium | —N/a |
| 16 July 2003 | Helsinki | Finland | Helsinki Olympic Stadium | ZZ Top; The Hellacopters |
| 18 July 2003 | Stockholm | Sweden | Stockholm Olympic Stadium | The Hives |
| 20 July 2003 | Stockholm | Sweden | Stockholm Globe Arena | —N/a |
| 22 July 2003 | Stockholm | Sweden | Cirkus | —N/a |
| 24 July 2003 | Hamburg | Germany | AOL-Arena | —N/a |
| 27 July 2003 | Prague | Czech Republic | Letná | Brainstorm; Olympic |
| 30 July 2003 | Toronto | Canada | SARSstock Concert; Downsview Park | —N/a |
| 8 August 2003 | Hanover | Germany | EXPO-Gelaende Messe Ost | —N/a |
| 11 August 2003 | Rotterdam | Netherlands | Feijenoord Stadion | —N/a |
| 13 August 2003 | Rotterdam | Netherlands | Feijenoord Stadion | —N/a |
| 15 August 2003 | Rotterdam | Netherlands | Rotterdam Ahoy | —N/a |
| 16 August 2003 | Utrecht | Netherlands | Muziekcentrum Vredenburg | —N/a |
| 19 August 2003 | Amsterdam | Netherlands | Amsterdam ArenA | —N/a |
| 24 August 2003 | London | England | Twickenham Stadium | —N/a |
| 27 August 2003 | London | England | Astoria | —N/a |
| 29 August 2003 | London | England | Wembley Arena | —N/a |
| 1 September 2003 | Glasgow | Scotland | Scottish Exhibition and Conference Centre | —N/a |
| 3 September 2003 | Glasgow | Scotland | Scottish Exhibition and Conference Centre | —N/a |
| 5 September 2003 | Manchester | England | Manchester Evening News Arena | —N/a |
| 7 September 2003 | Werchter | Belgium | Rock Werchter | —N/a |
| 9 September 2003 | Dublin | Ireland | Point Theatre | —N/a |
| 11 September 2003 | Dublin | Ireland | Point Theatre | —N/a |
| 13 September 2003 | London | England | Wembley Arena | —N/a |
| 15 September 2003 | London | England | Wembley Arena | —N/a |
| 20 September 2003 | London | England | Twickenham Stadium | —N/a |
| 22 September 2003 | Amsterdam | Netherlands | Amsterdam ArenA | —N/a |
| 25 September 2003 | Benidorm | Spain | Estadio Municipal Foietes | —N/a |
| 27 September 2003 | Coimbra | Portugal | Estádio Cidade de Coimbra | —N/a |
| 29 September 2003 | Zaragoza | Spain | Feria de Muestras | —N/a |
| 2 October 2003 | Zürich | Switzerland | Letzigrund Stadion | —N/a |
| 7 November 2003 | Hong Kong | | Tamar Festival Site | —N/a |
| 9 November 2003 | Hong Kong | | Tamar Festival Site | —N/a |

== Personnel ==
The Rolling Stones

- Mick Jagger – lead vocals, guitars, harmonica, additional keyboards
- Keith Richards – rhythm guitar, backing vocals
- Ronnie Wood – lead guitar
- Charlie Watts – drums

Additional musicians

- Darryl Jones – bass
- Chuck Leavell – keyboards, backing vocals
- Bobby Keys – saxophone
- Tim Ries – saxophone
- Michael Davis– trombone
- Kent Smith – trumpet
- Lisa Fischer – backing vocals
- Bernard Fowler – backing vocals
- Blondie Chaplin – backing vocals, additional guitar

== See also ==
- List of The Rolling Stones concert tours
- List of highest grossing concert tours
- List of most-attended concert tours
