= Monkey Man (Rolling Stones song) =

Song by the Rolling Stones

from the album Let It Bleed
- Released: 5 December 1969
- Recorded: April 1969
- Genre: Hard rock; blues rock
- Length: 4:11
- Label: Decca (UK); London (US)
- Songwriter: Jagger/Richards
- Producer: Jimmy Miller

"Monkey Man" is a song by English rock band the Rolling Stones, featured as the eighth track on their 1969 album Let It Bleed.

== Composition and recording ==
Mick Jagger and Keith Richards wrote "Monkey Man" as a tribute to Italian pop artist Mario Schifano, whom they met on the set of his movie Umano Non Umano! (Human, Not Human!). Recorded in April 1969, the song's introduction features distinctive vibraphone, bass, guitar, and piano. Richards plays main riff and slide guitar solo, Jagger provides vocals, producer Jimmy Miller plays tambourine, Nicky Hopkins plays piano, Charlie Watts provides drums, while Bill Wyman plays vibraphone and bass. Wyman's vibraphone is mixed onto the left channel together with Hopkins' piano.

Classic Rock History critic Matthew Pollard rated "Monkey Man" as the Rolling Stones' 9th best deep cut, particularly praising the "vibraphone chimes at the beginning [that] give the song its espionage-esque vibes, and Richards' awesome slide solo.

== Personnel ==
- Mick Jagger – vocals
- Keith Richards – electric and slide guitars, backing vocals
- Bill Wyman – bass guitar, vibraphone
- Charlie Watts – drums
- Nicky Hopkins – piano
- Jimmy Miller – tambourine

== Live performances ==
The Rolling Stones performed "Monkey Man" often on their 1994–1995 Voodoo Lounge Tour. A recording from their 2002/03 Licks Tour is included on Live Licks (2004).

== Sampling ==
The distinctive piano progression in the introduction is used as the opening theme "Playing With Fire" on the Stereo MCs' 1992 album Connected.
