= Can't You Hear Me Knocking =

1971 song by the Rolling Stones

Song by the Rolling Stones

from the album Sticky Fingers
- Released: 23 April 1971
- Recorded: March–May 1970
- Studio: Olympic Studios, London
- Genre: Blues rock; hard rock; jazz rock
- Length: 7:15
- Label: Rolling Stones; Atlantic
- Songwriters: Mick Jagger; Keith Richards
- Producer: Jimmy Miller

"Can't You Hear Me Knocking" is a song by English rock band the Rolling Stones from their 1971 album Sticky Fingers, noted for its unique open-tuned riff, extended ending jam, and menacing lyrics. The song has been well-received by critics and is considered one of the group's best songs.

== History ==
"Can't You Hear Me Knocking" was recorded from March to July 1970 at Stargroves with the Rolling Stones Mobile Studio, as well as at Olympic Studios in London. The song's genesis lay in a riff that guitarist Keith Richards had written in his trademark five-string open G tuning. "'Can't You Hear Me Knocking' came out flying," Richards said. "I just found the tuning and the riff and started to swing it...it's no big deal to play, the chopping, staccato bursts of chords, very direct and spare". The lineup included Mick Jagger (vocals), Richards (guitar), Mick Taylor (guitar), Bill Wyman (bass), and Charlie Watts (drums), joined by Bobby Keys (saxophone), Billy Preston (organ), Jimmy Miller (maracas), and Rocky Dijon (congas).

Jagger's vocals are "barbed", delivering drug-infused lyrics referencing a person with "satin shoes" and "plastic boots", who has "cocaine eyes" and a "speed freak jive". The song's second half consists of a jazzy, Latin-tinged jam, which Richards and Taylor said was spontaneous. "Towards the end of the song, I just felt like carrying on playing," Taylor said. "We didn't even know they were still taping," Richards said. "I figured we'd just fade it off". Taylor's extended guitar solo during the jam has drawn parallels to the style of Carlos Santana, and Keys's gritty, virtuoso sax solo added "new color" to the Stones on record.

"Can't You Hear Me Knocking" was played live just once in March 1971, with disastrous results, according to Keys: "It's the only time I've ever been onstage with the Rolling Stones when the wheels just completely came off. So, for about thirty years after that, anytime any mention was made of that song...Mick would just immediately gag. 'No! No, we're not gonna do that again!'" The song would not appear onstage again until the 2002–2003 Licks Tour.

== Reception and legacy ==
In 2004, Rolling Stone magazine listed "Can't You Hear Me Knocking" at number 25 on their "The 100 Greatest Guitar Songs of All Time" list. Vulture ranked it 15th best of the Rolling Stones' 373 songs:

The first two-and-a-half minutes of this song might be the Stones' best two-and-a-half minutes of music. Keith's riffing is so nasty, the rhythm section so locked in, Mick prowling and howling through the verses, and then everything zooms upward during the choruses. That it's followed by four minutes of mesmerizingly minimal Latin jamming? Apparently improvised in the studio? Amazing.

Slash of Guns N' Roses said, "One of the greatest Mick Taylor solos is 'Can't You Hear Me Knocking'...it's very simple stuff, but it's about how the notes are placed and how you approach them". Charlie Watts praised Taylor's "lyrical" playing on the song, and Mick Jagger said: "I think [the] track's really interesting. We've never done anything else like it since".

The song is featured in its entirety in the film Casino (1995) and also appears in Blow (2001), its "inherent menace" helping to underscore the depth and depravity of the films' themes of organised crime and drug trafficking.

== Personnel ==
The Rolling Stones

- Mick Jagger – lead and backing vocals
- Keith Richards – electric guitar, backing vocals
- Mick Taylor – electric guitar
- Bill Wyman – bass guitar
- Charlie Watts – drums

Additional personnel

- Rocky Dijon – congas
- Bobby Keys – tenor saxophone
- Billy Preston – organ
- Jimmy Miller – maracas, producer
- Glyn Johns – engineer
- Andy Johns – engineer

== Certifications ==
Certifications and sales for "Can't You Hear Me Knocking"
Region	Certification	Certified units/sales
Australia (ARIA)	Gold	35,000^{‡}
^{‡} Sales+streaming figures based on certification alone.
