= Start Me Up =

1981 single by The Rolling Stones

Single by the Rolling Stones

from the album Tattoo You
- B-side: "No Use in Crying"
- Released: 14 August 1981
- Recorded: January & March 1978 (basic track); April–June 1981 (vocals and overdubs)
- Genre: Hard rock; rock and roll
- Length: 3:34
- Label: Rolling Stones
- Songwriter: Jagger–Richards
- Producer: The Glimmer Twins

The Rolling Stones singles chronology
| "She's So Cold" (1980) | "Start Me Up" (1981) | "Waiting on a Friend" (1981) |

Music video
- "Start Me Up" on YouTube

Tattoo You track listing
- 11 tracks Side one: 1. "Start Me Up"; 2. "Hang Fire"; 3. "Slave"; 4. "Little T&A"; 5. "Black Limousine"; 6. "Neighbours"; Side two: 7. "Worried About You"; 8. "Tops"; 9. "Heaven"; 10. "No Use in Crying"; 11. "Waiting on a Friend"

"Start Me Up" is a song by the English rock band the Rolling Stones from their sixteenth studio album Tattoo You (1981). The song is a crowd pleaser, often performed by the band at the beginning of their concerts. It has also become a sports anthem.

Released as the album's lead single, it reached the number 1 positions on the Australia, Canada, Spain, and US Billboard Mainstream Rock charts, the number 2 position on US Billboard Hot 100 chart, and the number 7 position on the UK singles chart; and it performed well in other European countries. The music video for "Start Me Up" was placed in heavy rotation on the new MTV channel in 1981, adding to the song's lengthy chart run in the US.

The single's B-side is a slow blues number called "No Use in Crying", which is an album track on Tattoo You.

In 2006, VH1 ranked the song at number 94 on its countdown of "The 100 Greatest Songs of the '80s".

== Writing and recording ==
"Start Me Up" was originally a reggae song recorded in March 1975 during sessions for the Rolling Stones' album Black and Blue before it was re-worked during the January and March 1978 sessions for the Some Girls album. The song began as a reggae rock track named "Never Stop", but after dozens of takes it was abandoned. "Start Me Up" was not chosen for the album and was saved for later use. Keith Richards commented:

It was one of those things we cut a lot of times; one of those cuts that you can play forever and ever in the studio. Twenty minutes go by and you're still locked into those two chords ... Sometimes you become conscious of the fact that, 'Oh, it's "Brown Sugar" again,' so you begin to explore other rhythmic possibilities. It's basically trial and error. As I said, that one was pretty locked into a reggae rhythm for quite a few weeks. We were cutting it for Emotional Rescue, but it was nowhere near coming through, and we put it aside and almost forgot about it.

In 1981, with the band looking to tour, engineer Chris Kimsey proposed to lead singer Mick Jagger that archived songs could comprise the set. While searching through the vaults, Kimsey found the two takes of the song with a more rock vibe among some fifty reggae versions. Overdubs were completed on the track in early 1981 in New York City at the recording studios Electric Lady Studios and The Hit Factory. On the band's recording style for this track in particular, Kimsey commented in 2004:

Including run-throughs, 'Start Me Up' took about six hours to record. You see, if they all played the right chords in the right time, went to the chorus at the right time and got to the middle eight together, that was a master. It was like, 'Oh, wow!' Don't forget, they would never sit down and work out a song. They would jam it and the song would evolve out of that. That's their magic.

The "thump" to the song was achieved using mixer Bob Clearmountain's "bathroom reverb", a process involving the recording of some of the song's vocal and drum tracks with a miked speaker in the bathroom of the Power Station recording studio in New York City. It was there where final touches were added to the song, including Jagger's switch of the main lyrics from "start it up" to "start me up".

The song opens with what has since become a trademark riff for Richards. It is this, coupled with Charlie Watts' steady backbeat and Bill Wyman's echoing bass, that comprises most of the song. Lead guitarist Ronnie Wood can clearly be heard playing a layered variation of Richards' main riff (often live versions of the song are lengthened by giving Wood a solo near the middle of the song, pieces of which can be heard throughout the original recording). Throughout the song Jagger breaks in with a repeated bridge of "You make a grown man cry", followed by various pronouncements of sexual innuendo with automobile terminology. Percussion (cowbell and guiro) by Mike Carabello and handclaps by Jagger, Chris Kimsey and Barry Sage were added during overdub sessions in April and June 1981.

Billboard said that "its catchy refrain easily worms its way into the memory." Record World said that the song is highlighted by "biting, raunchy guitars and a rhythm kick that spanks hard".

A music video was produced for the single, directed by Michael Lindsay-Hogg. According to Lindsay-Hogg's recollection, Jagger and Watts proposed the collaboration to him over lunch with Jagger particularly keen to emulate the style of video shown on MTV, which he regarded as "the future". The subsequent production became one of the most programmed videos of MTV's early years.

== Release ==
"Start Me Up" peaked at number 7 on the UK Singles Charts in September 1981 and remains the last Rolling Stones song to appear in the UK Top 10. In Australia and Spain, the song reached number 1 in November 1981. In the US, "Start Me Up" spent three weeks at number 2 on the Billboard Hot 100 chart in October–November 1981, becoming the Stones' biggest hit of the 1980s in the United States.

The single spent 13 weeks atop the Billboard Top Rock Tracks chart. This set a record that was not broken until 1994 when Stone Temple Pilots' "Interstate Love Song" spent 15 weeks at number 1.

"Start Me Up" is often used to open the Rolling Stones' live shows and has been featured on the live albums Still Life (recorded 1981, released 1982), Flashpoint (recorded 1989, released 1991), Live Licks (recorded 2003, released 2004), Shine a Light (recorded 2006, released 2008), and Hyde Park Live (2013). It is also featured on several Stones live-concert films and DVD/Blu-ray sets: Let's Spend the Night Together (filmed 1981, released 1983), Stones at the Max (filmed 1990, released 1991), The Rolling Stones: Voodoo Lounge Live (filmed 1994, released 1995), Bridges to Babylon Tour '97–98 (filmed 1997, released 1998), Four Flicks (2003), The Biggest Bang (filmed 2006, released 2007), Shine a Light (filmed 2006, released 2008), Sweet Summer Sun: Hyde Park Live (2013), and Havana Moon (2016, bonus track). The song was the first of three songs played by the Stones during halftime at Super Bowl XL in 2006.

The song has been included on every major Stones compilation album since its release, including Rewind (1971–1984), Jump Back, Forty Licks, and GRRR!. Writing for AllMusic, Stewart Mason called it "the last great Rolling Stones song." Rolling Stone magazine ranked it the 8th Best Sports Anthem.

== Personnel ==
Credits sourced from Sound On Sound and the authors Philippe Margotin and Jean-Michel Guesdon.

The Rolling Stones

- Mick Jagger – lead and backing vocals
- Keith Richards – rhythm guitar, backing vocals
- Ronnie Wood – lead guitar, backing vocals
- Bill Wyman – bass guitar
- Charlie Watts – drums

Additional personnel

- Michael Carabello – cowbell, congas
- Chris Kimsey – handclaps
- Barry Sage – handclaps

Technical

- The Glimmer Twins – producers
- Chris Kimsey – associate producer, engineer
- Bob Clearmountain – engineer
- Gary Lyons – engineer
- Barry Sage – assistant engineer

== Charts ==
=== Weekly charts ===
| Chart (1981) | Peak position |
|---|---|
| Australia (Kent Music Report) | 1 |
| Austria (Ö3 Austria Top 40) | 14 |
| Belgium (Ultratop 50 Flanders) | 7 |
| Canadá (CHUM Chart) | 1 |
| Canada Top Singles (RPM) | 2 |
| Ireland (IRMA) | 11 |
| Netherlands (Dutch Top 40) | 9 |
| Netherlands (Single Top 100) | 5 |
| New Zealand (Recorded Music NZ) | 33 |
| Norway (VG-lista) | 8 |
| Sweden (Sverigetopplistan) | 14 |
| Switzerland (Schweizer Hitparade) | 5 |
| UK Singles (Official Charts) | 7 |
| US Billboard Hot 100 | 2 |
| US Billboard Mainstream Rock | 1 |
| US Cashbox Top 100 | 4 |
| West Germany (GfK) | 36 |
| Zimbabwe (ZIMA) | 1 |

=== Year-end charts ===
| Chart (1981) | Position |
|---|---|
| Australia (Kent Music Report) | 13 |
| Belgium (Ultratop 50 Flanders) | 53 |
| Canada Top Singles (RPM) | 5 |
| Netherlands (Single Top 100) | 83 |

== Certifications ==
| Region | Certification | Certified units/sales |
|---|---|---|
| Australia (ARIA) | 3× Platinum | 210,000^{‡} |
| Denmark (IFPI Danmark) | Gold | 45,000^{‡} |
| Italy (FIMI) | Platinum | 70,000^{‡} |
| New Zealand (RMNZ) | 3× Platinum | 90,000^{‡} |
| Spain (Promusicae) | Platinum | 60,000^{‡} |
| United Kingdom (BPI) | Platinum | 600,000^{‡} |
^{‡} Sales+streaming figures based on certification alone.

== Commercial usage ==
Microsoft paid about US$3 million to use this song in their Windows 95 marketing campaign. Due to their well-known unwillingness to using their music for advertising, contemporary reporting has suggested that this was the first time that the Rolling Stones licensed their music for commercials. However this collaboration represented the first time since 1964, as fans unearthed that the band was paid £400 to perform a Rice Krispies television advertisement in the United Kingdom, with a jingle co-written with Brian Jones. In 2012, a remixed version of the song was used as the soundtrack to an Omega advertising campaign for their role as official timekeepers of the 2012 Summer Olympics.

CBS Sports played the song to begin the 2025 NCAA Division I men's basketball tournament Selection Show as a tribute to Greg Gumbel, the longtime host of "March Madness" who had died at the end of 2024.

== See also ==
- List of Billboard Mainstream Rock number-one songs of the 1980s
