= Let It Bleed (song) =

- Japanese single picture sleeve

Song by the Rolling Stones

from the album Let It Bleed
- B-side: "You Got the Silver"
- Released: 5 December 1969
- Recorded: 9 March – 10 June 1969
- Genre: Blues; folk rock; country
- Length: 5:28
- Label: Decca Records/ABKCO
- Songwriter: Mick Jagger/Keith Richards
- Producer: Jimmy Miller

"Let It Bleed" is a song by the English rock band the Rolling Stones. It was written by Mick Jagger and Keith Richards and is featured on the 1969 album of the same name, the first example of a Rolling Stones title track. It was released as a single in Japan in February 1970.

== Composition ==
The song opens with a slide piece and quickly moves into a solo acoustic guitar capo on the 3rd fret strumming the chords of A, D and E before bass, drums and piano join in, respectively. Wyman's autoharp can be heard somewhat faintly during the first verse with noticeable 'ping' sounds coming from it around the 0:40-0:50 mark but it is mostly inaudible throughout the track after the 0:55 ('she said my breasts') minute mark.

== Reception ==
The lyrics include a number of drug and sexual references, including an invitation for "coke and sympathy", a reference to a "junkie nurse" and Jagger's suggestions that we all need someone to "bleed on", "cream on" and "cum on". However, to Allmusic critic Richie Unterberger, the song is mainly about "emotional dependency", with Jagger willing to accept a partner who wants to lean "on him for emotional support".

Unterberger also asserts that "Let It Bleed" may be "the best illustration" of the way the Rolling Stones make "a slightly sloppy approach work for them rather than against them." He also praises Jagger's vocals, stating the song represents "one of his best vocals, with a supremely lazy approach that seems to be both affectionate and mocking at the same time."

== Live performances ==
The song was played for the first time live at the Sir Morgan's Cove club in Worcester, Massachusetts on 14 September 1981, before being performed at every show on the 1981 U.S. Tour and the 1982 Tour of Europe. Ever since, the song has been performed from time to time in concert. It appears in the Hal Ashby-directed concert film Let's Spend the Night Together and on the live albums From The Vault: Hampton Coliseum (Live In 1981) [December 18, 1981] and Let It Bleed (Live At Wembley ‘82) [June 25. 1982].

== Personnel ==
The Rolling Stones

- Mick Jagger – vocals
- Keith Richards – electric, acoustic and slide guitar
- Bill Wyman – bass guitar, autoharp
- Charlie Watts – drums

Additional personnel

- Ian Stewart – piano
