= Barry Sage =

British sound engineer

Barry Sage is a British sound engineer and producer, currently living in Santiago, Chile. Sage has worked with a variety of British and Latin American acts, including the Rolling Stones, Boy George, Pet Shop Boys, Nicole and Charly García.

== Career ==
Sage began his career as a tea boy at Trident Studios in London, later going on to be a tape operator assisting Elton John and Queen, among others.

=== Rolling Stones ===
Initially as the assistant to Chris Kimsey, Sage worked with the Rolling Stones twice, in 1978 (on Some Girls) and 1981 (Tattoo You). Particularly given the drug-use scandal hanging over Keith Richards at the time, the period was frenetic. In a 2014 interview, Sage described long days in the studio and a prolific output of 40 tracks and 80 reels.

During the production of Tattoo You, Mick Jagger and Sage were working alone one night when Jagger asked Sage to record himself clapping for a song. That song, "Start Me Up", would go on to international success, with Sage estimating in a 2017 interview that the lifetime royalties he received for his work on the track totalled some 15 million Chilean pesos (roughly US$22,000).

=== Post-Stones and shift to Spanish pop ===
After the Stones, Sage went on to assist on a considerable number of songs for major musicians, including "Blue Monday" by New Order and the soundtrack for Under the Cherry Moon by Prince, whom Sage described as "very demanding of his musicians". By the late 1980s Sage shifted to Spanish pop amid changes in the British music industry, working with La Oreja de Van Gogh and Sergio Dalma, among others. By 2000, he was searching for a house in Granada.

=== Move to Chile ===
Sage's first involvement with Chilean music came in 1994. He was selected to mix Esperando nada by Nicole. for BMG. Two years later, he would make his first visit to the country, to record the album Play for local rock group Solar. His relationship with Solar frontman Alejandro Gómez proved fruitful when Gómez started a new group, Alamedas, with which Sage also worked. Sage returned to Chile in 2010 for a panel discussion sponsored by the Duoc UC.

In 2012, after labour issues arose in Spain, Sage moved to Santiago. Two years later, he bought a plot of land in Isla Negra to build a recording studio; however, he sold the studio in order to resolve financial matters in England. Sage also cited a better work-life balance in Chile as a reason to relocate, as well as that major artists in the UK increasingly make money from their back catalogue and produce few new recordings.
