= Ian Stewart (musician) =

Scottish keyboardist (1938–1985)

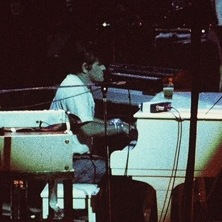
- Stewart performing at Chicago Stadium in Chicago, Illinois, with the Rolling Stones in July 1975

Background information
- Born: Ian Andrew Robert Stewart; 18 July 1938; Pittenweem, Fife, Scotland
- Died: 12 December 1985 (aged 47) London, England
- Genres: Rock; boogie-woogie
- Occupations: Musician; tour manager
- Instruments: Keyboards; percussion
- Years active: 1961–1985
- Formerly of: The Rolling Stones; Rocket 88

Ian Andrew Robert Stewart (18 July 1938 – 12 December 1985) was a Scottish keyboardist and co-founder of the Rolling Stones. He was removed from the lineup in May 1963 at the request of manager Andrew Loog Oldham who felt he did not fit the band's image. He remained as road manager and pianist for over two decades until his death, and was posthumously inducted into the Rock and Roll Hall of Fame along with the rest of the band in 1989.

== Early life ==
Stewart was born at his mother's family farm, Kirklatch, at Pittenweem, in the East Neuk of Fife, Scotland, and raised in Sutton, son of architect John Stewart and Annie, née Black. He attended Tiffin School in Kingston upon Thames. Stewart (often called Stu) started playing piano when he was six. He took up the banjo and played with amateur groups on both instruments.

== Career ==
=== Role in the Rolling Stones ===
Stewart, who loved rhythm & blues, boogie-woogie, blues and big-band jazz, was working as a shipping clerk at a London chemical company when he was the first to respond to Brian Jones's advertisement in Jazz News of 2 May 1962 seeking musicians to form a rhythm & blues group. Mick Jagger and Keith Richards joined in June, and the group, with Dick Taylor (later of the Pretty Things) on bass and Mick Avory (later of the Kinks) on drums, played their first gig under the name the Rollin' Stones at the Marquee Club on 12 July 1962. Richards described meeting Stewart thus: "He used to play boogie-woogie piano in jazz clubs, apart from his regular job. He blew my head off too, when he started to play. I never heard a white piano player play like that before." By December 1962 and January 1963, Bill Wyman and Charlie Watts had joined, replacing a series of bassists and drummers.

During this period, Stewart had a job at Imperial Chemical Industries. None of the other band members had a telephone; Stewart said, "[My] desk at ICI was the headquarters of the Stones organisation. My number was advertised in Jazz News and I handled the Stones' bookings at work." He also bought a van to transport the group and their equipment to their gigs.

In early May 1963, the band's manager, Andrew Loog Oldham, said Stewart should no longer be onstage, that six members were too many for a popular group and that the older, burly, and square-jawed Stewart did not fit the image. He said Stewart could stay as road manager and play piano on recordings. Stewart accepted this demotion. Richards said: "[Stu] might have realised that in the way it was going to have to be marketed, he would be out of sync, but that he could still be a vital part. I'd probably have said, 'Well, fuck you', but he said 'OK, I'll just drive you around.' That takes a big heart, but Stu had one of the largest hearts around."

Stewart loaded gear into his van, drove the group to gigs, replaced guitar strings and set up Watts's drums the way he himself would play them. "I never ever swore at him," Watts said of their relationship. He also played piano and occasionally organ on most of the band's albums in the first decades, as well as providing criticism. Shortly after Stewart's death Mick Jagger said: "He really helped this band swing, on numbers like 'Honky Tonk Women' and loads of others. Stu was the one guy we tried to please. We wanted his approval when we were writing or rehearsing a song. We'd want him to like it."

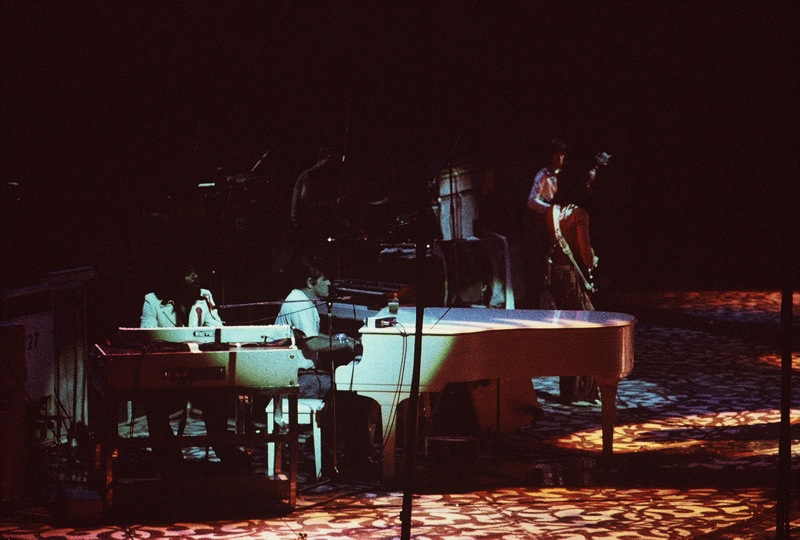
Ian Stewart (centre) and Billy Preston (left) performing with the Rolling Stones

Stewart contributed piano, organ, electric piano, percussion, or a combination of these to all Rolling Stones albums released between 1964 and 1986, except for Their Satanic Majesties Request, Beggars Banquet, and Some Girls. Stewart was not the only keyboard player who worked extensively with the band: Jack Nitzsche, Nicky Hopkins, Billy Preston, and Ian McLagan all supplemented his work. Stewart played piano on numbers of his choosing throughout tours in 1969, 1972, 1975–76, 1978 and 1981–82. Stewart favoured blues and country rockers, and remained dedicated to boogie-woogie and early rhythm & blues. He refused to play in minor keys, saying: "When I'm on stage with the Stones and a minor chord comes along, I lift me hands in protest." In 1976, Stewart stated, "You can squawk about money, but the money the Stones have made hasn't done them much good. It's really gotten them into some trouble. They can't even live in their own country now," referring to band members' tax exile status to minimize tax obligations on their high incomes and royalty payments.

Stewart remained aloof from the band's drug abuse and partying lifestyle. "I think he looked upon it as a load of silliness," said guitarist Mick Taylor. "I also think it was because he saw what had happened to Brian. I could tell from the expression on his face when things started to get a bit crazy during the making of Exile on Main Street. I think he found it very hard. We all did." Stewart played golf, and as road manager showed a preference for hotels with courses. Richards recalls: "We'd be playing in some town where there's all these chicks, and they want to get laid and we want to lay them. But Stu would have booked us into some hotel about ten miles out of town. You'd wake up in the morning and there's the links. We're bored to death looking for some action and Stu's playing Gleneagles."

=== Other work ===
Stewart contributed to Led Zeppelin's "Rock and Roll" from Led Zeppelin IV and "Boogie with Stu" (which was also named after his nickname) from Physical Graffiti, two numbers in traditional rock and roll vein, both featuring his boogie-woogie style. Another was Howlin' Wolf's 1971 The London Howlin' Wolf Sessions album, featuring Eric Clapton, Ringo Starr, Klaus Voormann, Steve Winwood, and Bill Wyman and Charlie Watts. He also played piano and organ on the 1982 Bad to the Bone album of George Thorogood and the Destroyers. He also performed with Ronnie Lane in a televised concert.

On 5 January 1966 Bill Wyman produced "Stu-Ball" for Ian Stewart and the Railroaders at IBC Studios, London with Stewart on piano, Wyman on bass, Keith Richards (guitar) and Tony Meehan (drums).

In 1981 Stewart and Charlie Watts contributed to the song "Bad Penny Blues", which appeared on the album, These Kind of Blues by The Blues Band, and was a founding member, with Watts, of Rocket 88.

== Personal life ==
Stewart married Cynthia Dillane, on 2 January 1967, together they had a son named Giles. Through his son, Stewart has four grandchildren.

== Death and posthumous recognition ==
Stewart contributed to the Rolling Stones' 1983 Undercover, and was present during the 1985 recording for Dirty Work (released in 1986). In early December 1985, Stewart began having respiratory problems. On 12 December, he went to a clinic to have the problem examined, but suffered a massive heart attack and died in the waiting room. Stewart was 47 years old.

The Rolling Stones played a tribute gig with Rocket 88 in February 1986 at London's 100 Club, and included a 30-second clip of Stewart playing the blues standard "Key to the Highway" at the end of Dirty Work. When the Stones were inducted into the Rock and Roll Hall of Fame in 1989, they requested that Stewart's name be included.

In his 2010 autobiography Life, Keith Richards says: "Ian Stewart. I'm still working for him. To me, the Rolling Stones is his band. Without his knowledge and organisation ... we'd be nowhere."

On 19 April 2011, pianist Ben Waters released an Ian Stewart tribute album, entitled Boogie 4 Stu. One of the songs recorded for this album was Bob Dylan's "Watching the River Flow", played by the Rolling Stones featuring Bill Wyman on bass. This was the first time since 1992 that Wyman joined his former band.

Stewart was honoured by the Scottish Music Awards in 2017. Jagger, Richards, Wood and Watts all sent video messages for the ceremony and the award was accepted by Stewart's widow and son.

=== Works inspired by Stewart ===
According to a Sunday Herald article in March 2006, Stewart was the basis for a fictional detective:

... Scottish crime writer Ian Rankin has revealed that John Rebus, the star of 15 novels set in the grimy underbelly of the nation's capital, may have more to do with the Rolling Stones than any detective could have surmised. The award-winning novelist admits during a new Radio 4 series exploring the relationships between crime writers and their favourite music that he took some of his inspiration for the unruly inspector from the "sixth Stone", Ian Stewart.

The lyrics to Aidan Moffat & the Best-Of's song "The Sixth Stone" were written by Ian Rankin about Stewart. The song is included on Chemikal Underground's compilation Ballads of the Book, which featured Scottish authors and poets writing lyrics for contemporary Scottish bands.

== Selected performances ==
- The Rolling Stones: organ on "You Can Make It If You Try" (1964), "2120 South Michigan Avenue" (1964), "Empty Heart" (1964), "Time Is On My Side" (1964), and "Stupid Girl" (1966); piano on "Stoned" (1963), "Around and Around" (1964), "Confessin' the Blues" (1964), "Down the Road Apiece" (1965), "That's How Strong My Love Is" (1965), "Flight 505" (1966), "My Obsession" (1967), "Honky Tonk Women" (1969), "Let It Bleed" (1969), "Little Queenie" (live) (1970), "Brown Sugar" (1971), "Dead Flowers" (1971), "Sweet Virginia" (1972), "Silver Train" (1973), "Star Star" (1973), "It's Only Rock 'n Roll (But I Like It)" (1974), "Short and Curlies" (1974), "Summer Romance" (1980), "Black Limousine" (1981), and "Twenty Flight Rock" (live) (1982); percussion on "Hot Stuff" (1976)
- Led Zeppelin: piano on "Rock and Roll" and "Boogie with Stu" (both recorded in 1971).
- The Yardbirds: piano on "Drinking Muddy Water" (1967).
