= Steel Wheels Live =

Live album by the Rolling Stones
- Released: 25 September 2020
- Recorded: 19 December 1989
- Venues: Convention Center; Atlantic City, New Jersey, U.S.
- Genre: Rock
- Length: 151:45
- Label: Eagle Rock

The Rolling Stones chronology
Honk (2019)	Steel Wheels Live (2020)	El Mocambo 1977 (2022)

Steel Wheels Live is a live album by the English rock band the Rolling Stones. It was broadcast live and recorded on 19 December 1989 on the Steel Wheels/Urban Jungle Tour, promoting Steel Wheels album, and was released in 2020. Flashpoint was another live album from the same tour.

It features appearances by Axl Rose and Izzy Stradlin from Guns N' Roses, Eric Clapton and John Lee Hooker.

The album was released as Blu-ray and DVD video, as well as audio-only on a double CD or four LPs or digital downloads.

Special limited six-disc deluxe version, which included the DVD, Blu-ray, double CD as well as DVD of Tokyo Dome (previously released only in Japan as From the Vault Extra Live in Japan Tokyo Dome 1990.2.24), and an exclusive CD of non-core song performances during the tour, called Steel Wheels Rare Reels.

== Track listing ==
All tracks are written by Mick Jagger and Keith Richards, except where noted.

No.	Title	Writer(s)	Guest	Length
1.	"Intro"			1:06
2.	"Start Me Up"			3:47
3.	"Bitch"			3:28
4.	"Sad Sad Sad"			3:47
5.	"Undercover of the Night"			4:21
6.	"Harlem Shuffle"	Bob Relf; Earl Nelson		4:34
7.	"Tumbling Dice"			4:18
8.	"Miss You"			6:43
9.	"Terrifying"			4:59
10.	"Ruby Tuesday"			3:48
11.	"Salt of the Earth"		Axl Rose; Izzy Stradlin	6:02
12.	"Rock and a Hard Place"			5:05
13.	"Mixed Emotions"			5:18
14.	"Honky Tonk Women"			4:55
15.	"Midnight Rambler"			10:21
16.	"You Can't Always Get What You Want"			7:18
17.	"Little Red Rooster"	Willie Dixon	Eric Clapton	6:20
18.	"Boogie Chillen'"	John Lee Hooker	Eric Clapton; John Lee Hooker	5:32
19.	"Can't Be Seen"			6:06
20.	"Happy"			4:33
21.	"Paint It Black"			3:50
22.	"2000 Light Years from Home"			7:24
23.	"Sympathy for the Devil"			7:41
24.	"Gimme Shelter"			7:32
25.	"It's Only Rock 'n Roll (But I Like It)"			4:49
26.	"Brown Sugar"			4:36
27.	"(I Can't Get No) Satisfaction"			7:26
28.	"Jumpin' Jack Flash"			6:36
Total length:				152:32

A CD with rarely performed songs, exclusive to the special limited six-disc deluxe version.

Steel Wheels: Rare Reels
No.	Title	Writer(s)	Venue	Length
1.	"Play With Fire"	Nanker Phelge	C.N.E. Stadium; Toronto, Ontario, Canada; 3 September 1989
2.	"Dead Flowers"		C.N.E. Stadium; Toronto, Ontario, Canada; 3 September 1989
3.	"Almost Hear You Sigh"	Mick Jagger; Keith Richards; Steve Jordan	Wembley Stadium; London, England; 6 July 1990
4.	"I Just Want to Make Love to You"	Willie Dixon	Wembley Stadium; London, England; 6 July 1990
5.	"Street Fighting Man"		Wembley Stadium; London, England; 6 July 1990

== Personnel ==
The Rolling Stones

- Mick Jagger – lead vocals, guitars, harmonica
- Keith Richards – lead vocals in "Can't Be Seen" and "Happy", guitars
- Ronnie Wood – guitars
- Bill Wyman – bass guitar
- Charlie Watts – drums

Additional personnel

- Matt Clifford – keyboards, French horn
- Chuck Leavell – keyboards, backing vocals
- Bobby Keys – saxophone
- Horns by The Uptown Horns – Arno Hecht, Paul Litteral, Bob Funk, Crispen Cloe
- Bernard Fowler – backing vocals
- Lisa Fischer – backing vocals
- Cindy Mizelle – backing vocals

== Charts ==
Chart performance of Steel Wheels Live
Chart (2020)	Peak position
Austrian Albums (Ö3 Austria)	12
Belgian Albums (Ultratop Flanders)	15
Belgian Albums (Ultratop Wallonia)	13
Dutch Albums (Album Top 100)	9
French Albums (SNEP)	132
German Albums (Offizielle Top 100)	2
Italian Albums (FIMI)	61
Portuguese Albums (AFP)	46
Scottish Albums (Official Charts)	50
US Billboard 200	180
