= Stones at the Max =

1991 concert film

Rolling Stones: Live at the Max
- DVD cover
- Directed by: Julien Temple; David Douglas; Roman Kroitor; Noel Archambault; Christine Strande
- Produced by: Michael Cohl; Nicholas J. Gray; Toni Myers; André Picard; Martin Walters; Robbie Williams
- Starring: The Rolling Stones
- Cinematography: David Douglas; Andrew Kitzanuk
- Edited by: Daniel Blevins; Jim Gable; Lisa Grootenboer; Toni Myers
- Distributed by: IMAX
- Release date: June 1992
- Running time: 89 minutes
- Country: United States
- Language: English
- Box office: $3 million (US/Canada rentals)

Rolling Stones: Live at the Max, or simply Stones at the Max, is a concert film by the Rolling Stones released in 1991. It was specially filmed in IMAX during the Urban Jungle Tour in Europe in 1990. It was the first concert movie shot in the IMAX format.

Rolling Stones: Live at the Max premiered 25 October 1991 in Los Angeles at the California Museum of Science and Industry. In the UK it was shown at the National Museum of Photography, Film and Television in Bradford, Yorkshire in 1992. The tagline was "Larger than life".

== Production ==
Rolling Stones: Live at the Max was the first feature-length film ever to be filmed in IMAX format.

Imaging fed to the jumbotrons at concerts came from trucks where switching equipment was used to control live feeds from an army of video cameras. Midway through post-production, the request came to use some of this video that had been recorded on 3/4" tape in the final IMAX film. This required a series of tests to improve the fidelity of this video footage so that it could be mixed in with the footage captured on IMAX 70 mm film without a significant drop in quality. Test negatives were processed in New York and prints were returned to Toronto for screening at the IMAX theatre at Ontario Place. After many tries, a process was created to improve the video enough to be used. The final release included approximately 6 minutes of this footage.

Originally shot with 8 IMAX cameras outfitted with the first long load film magazines, 5 concerts were recorded in 3 cities. The band's repertoire was so extensive and the setlist so variable that it was impossible to ensure that every song would be played in every show, despite the large number of magazines and the difficulty of loading them. Trying to cut the film on a traditional flatbed editor proved impossible, so an Edit Droid, an early digital non-linear editing system developed, and custom configured by Lucasfilm, was used. 35mm work prints were assembled, transferred to video, and recorded to laser video discs that the Edit Droid could work from. The 8-headed Droid could load all databases and imaging for a single song in all concert locations. The editors could jump to any point in a song, see what was available (or not), and then jump to the same spot in all subsequent concerts.

== Home video ==
VHS, LaserDisc, DVD and Blu-ray versions were released under the title Rolling Stones: Live at the Max.

See also the live album Flashpoint, released in 1991, from the same tour.

== Critical reception ==
On At the Movies, Gene Siskel praised Stones at the Max, highlighting the immersive experience and saying "the Stones have never looked or sounded better on film." Siskel also praised the high definition of the picture, saying the detail was so sharp that he could tell what time it was onstage by reading Ron Wood's watch. Siskel's colleague Roger Ebert was also impressed by the size and scope of the photography, saying, "I could tell you how many cigarettes Keith Richards had left in his package of Marlboro Reds" and predicted other bands would be "jealous" of the groundbreaking film. Both critics gave the film a "thumbs up."

== 2025 IMAX Re-Release ==
In December 2025, Rolling Stones – At the Max received a new limited theatrical re‑release, returning to cinemas exclusively in IMAX for the first time since a 2007 revival. The 1991 concert film was digitally remastered using IMAX’s DMR process and presented with a new IMAX audio mix, with distribution handled by IMAX in partnership with Mercury Studios and Pathé Live.

== Track listing ==
All tracks by Mick Jagger and Keith Richards.

1. "Continental Drift"
2. "Start Me Up"
3. "Sad Sad Sad"
4. "Tumbling Dice"
5. "Ruby Tuesday"
6. "Rock and a Hard Place"
7. "Honky Tonk Women"
8. "You Can't Always Get What You Want"
9. "Happy"
10. "Paint It Black"
11. "2000 Light Years from Home"
12. "Sympathy for the Devil"
13. "Street Fighting Man"
14. "It's Only Rock 'n Roll (But I Like It)"
15. "Brown Sugar"
16. "(I Can't Get No) Satisfaction"

== Stadium venues and dates ==
The list below reflects the sound recording dates. The video is a mix of the listed shows and plus footage from 29 July 1990.

Song title	Date played	Venue
Continental Drift		
Start Me Up	24 August 1990	London, England
Sad Sad Sad	28 July 1990	Turin, Italy
Tumbling Dice	24 August 1990	London, England
Ruby Tuesday	25 August 1990	London, England
Rock and a Hard Place	28 July 1990	Turin, Italy
Honky Tonk Women	28 July 1990	Turin, Italy
You Can't Always Get What You Want	25 August 1990	London, England
Happy	14 August 1990	East Berlin, German Dem. Rep.
Paint It Black	28 July 1990	Turin, Italy
2000 Light Years from Home	28 July 1990	Turin, Italy
Sympathy for the Devil	28 July 1990	Turin, Italy
Street Fighting Man	25 August 1990	London, England
It's Only Rock 'n Roll (But I Like It)	14 August 1990	East Berlin, German Dem. Rep.
Brown Sugar	25 August 1990	London, England
(I Can't Get No) Satisfaction	13 August 1990	East Berlin, German Dem. Rep.

== Personnel ==
The Rolling Stones

- Mick Jagger – lead vocals, guitars, percussion
- Keith Richards – vocals, guitars
- Ronnie Wood – guitars
- Bill Wyman – bass guitar
- Charlie Watts – drums

Additional personnel

- Matt Clifford – keyboards, backing vocals, French horn, percussion
- Chuck Leavell – keyboards, backing vocals, percussion
- Bobby Keys – saxophone
- The Uptown Horns: Arno Hecht, Paul Litteral, Bob Funk, Crispen Cioe – horns
- Bernard Fowler – backing vocals, percussion
- Sophia Jones – backing vocals
- Lorelei McBroom – backing vocals

== Certifications ==
Region	Certification	Certified units/sales
Australia (ARIA)	2× Platinum	30,000^{^}
^{^} Shipments figures based on certification alone.
