= Honk (album) =

Compilation album by the Rolling Stones
- Released: 19 April 2019
- Recorded: 1969–2015 (standard edition); 1969–2019 (deluxe edition)
- Genre: Rock
- Length: 152:39 (standard edition); 196:27 (deluxe edition)
- Label: Promotone BV; Universal Music; Interscope (US)
- Producer: The Glimmer Twins; Chris Kimsey; Steve Lillywhite; Jimmy Miller; Don Was

The Rolling Stones chronology
Voodoo Lounge Uncut (2018)	Honk (2019)	Steel Wheels Live (2020)

Professional ratings
Aggregate scores
Source	Rating
Metacritic	78/100
Review scores
Source	Rating
AllMusic	3.5/5 stars
Classic Rock	3.5/5 stars
Rolling Stone	4.5/5 stars

Honk is a compilation album by the Rolling Stones, released on 19 April 2019 through Promotone BV and Universal Music. It features tracks from each of their studio albums since 1971. Honk includes all 18 tracks from the 1993 compilation Jump Back. The standard edition includes 36 tracks, while the deluxe edition adds 10 bonus tracks of recent live recordings. The iTunes edition contains the Digital deluxe version tracks along with the deluxe edition's live tracks but with the addition of "Living in a Ghost Town" as the album's first track. It reached the top ten in nine countries, peaking at No. 23 in the US.

== Track listing ==
Standard digital edition and physical edition
No.	Title	Original album	Length
1.	"Start Me Up"	Tattoo You (1981)	3:33
2.	"Brown Sugar"	Sticky Fingers (1971)	3:50
3.	"Rocks Off"	Exile on Main St. (1972)	4:32
4.	"Miss You"	Some Girls (1978)	4:48
5.	"Tumbling Dice"	Exile on Main St. (1972)	3:46
6.	"Just Your Fool"	Blue & Lonesome (2016)	2:18
7.	"Wild Horses"	Sticky Fingers (1971)	5:42
8.	"Fool to Cry"	Black and Blue (1976)	5:05
9.	"Angie"	Goats Head Soup (1973)	4:32
10.	"Beast of Burden"	Some Girls (1978)	4:25
11.	"Hot Stuff"	Black and Blue (1976)	5:21
12.	"It's Only Rock 'n Roll (But I Like It)"	It's Only Rock 'n Roll (1974)	5:08
13.	"Rock and a Hard Place"	Steel Wheels (1989)	5:24
14.	"Doom and Gloom"	GRRR! (2012)	3:58
15.	"Love Is Strong"	Voodoo Lounge (1994)	3:47
16.	"Mixed Emotions"	Steel Wheels (1989)	4:38
17.	"Don't Stop"	Forty Licks (2002)	3:59
18.	"Ride 'Em On Down"	Blue & Lonesome (2016)	2:49
19.	"Bitch"	Sticky Fingers (1971)	3:37
20.	"Harlem Shuffle"	Dirty Work (1986)	3:25
21.	"Hate to See You Go"	Blue & Lonesome (2016)	3:22
22.	"Rough Justice"	A Bigger Bang (2005)	3:12
23.	"Happy"	Exile on Main St. (1972)	3:05
24.	"Doo Doo Doo Doo Doo (Heartbreaker)"	Goats Head Soup (1973)	3:27
25.	"One More Shot"	GRRR! (2012)	3:02
26.	"Respectable"	Some Girls (1978)	3:08
27.	"You Got Me Rocking"	Voodoo Lounge (1994)	3:35
28.	"Rain Fall Down"	A Bigger Bang (2005)	4:54
29.	"Dancing with Mr. D."	Goats Head Soup (1973)	4:53
30.	"Undercover of the Night"	Undercover (1983)	4:33
31.	"Emotional Rescue"	Emotional Rescue (1980)	5:40
32.	"Waiting on a Friend"	Tattoo You (1981)	4:35
33.	"Saint of Me"	Bridges to Babylon (1997)	5:15
34.	"Out of Control"	Bridges to Babylon (1997)	4:45
35.	"Streets of Love"	A Bigger Bang (2005)	5:09
36.	"Out of Tears"	Voodoo Lounge (1994)	5:27

Bonus disc: Live tracks
No.	Title	Venue and Date	Length
1.	"Get Off of My Cloud" (live)	Principality Stadium; Cardiff, Wales; 15 June 2018	3:20
2.	"Dancing with Mr. D." (live)	GelreDome; Arnhem, Netherlands; 15 October 2017	4:36
3.	"Beast of Burden" (live featuring Ed Sheeran)	Arrowhead Stadium; Kansas City, Missouri, U.S. 27 June 2015	4:16
4.	"She's a Rainbow" (live)	U Arena; Paris, France; 25 October 2017	3:23
5.	"Wild Horses" (live featuring Florence Welch)	London Stadium; Stratford, London, England; 22 May 2018	4:49
6.	"Let's Spend the Night Together" (live)	Old Trafford; Trafford, Greater Manchester, England; 5 June 2018	4:04
7.	"Dead Flowers" (live featuring Brad Paisley)	Wells Fargo Center; Philadelphia, Pennsylvania, U.S. 18 June 2013	5:24
8.	"Shine a Light" (live)	Johan Cruijff ArenA; Amsterdam, Netherlands; 30 September 2017	4:11
9.	"Under My Thumb" (live)	London Stadium; Stratford, London, England; 22 May 2018	4:30
10.	"Bitch" (live featuring Dave Grohl)	Honda Center; Anaheim, California, U.S. 18 May 2013	5:15

Digital deluxe version track listing
No.	Title	Length
1.	"Start Me Up"
2.	"Doom and Gloom"
3.	"Brown Sugar"
4.	"Beast of Burden"
5.	"Wild Horses"
6.	"Angie"
7.	"Miss You"
8.	"Rocks Off"
9.	"Don't Stop"
10.	"Tumbling Dice"
11.	"Ride 'Em on Down"
12.	"Rain Fall Down"
13.	"Love Is Strong"
14.	"Mixed Emotions"
15.	"Doo Doo Doo Doo Doo (Heartbreaker)"
16.	"It's Only Rock'n'Roll (But I Like It)"
17.	"Emotional Rescue"
18.	"Waiting on a Friend"
19.	"Just Your Fool"
20.	"Dancing With Mr. D."
21.	"Streets of Love"
22.	"Fool to Cry"
23.	"Harlem Shuffle"
24.	"Bitch"
25.	"Hot Stuff"
26.	"Respectable"
27.	"Undercover of the Night"
28.	"Hate to See You Go"
29.	"Out of Control"
30.	"Rock and a Hard Place"
31.	"Happy"
32.	"Out of Tears"
33.	"Rough Justice"
34.	"You Got Me Rocking"
35.	"Saint of Me"
36.	"One More Shot"

Single disc and vinyl editions

1. "Start Me Up" (1981)
2. "Brown Sugar" (1971)
3. "Miss You" (1978)
4. "Tumbling Dice" (1972)
5. "Just Your Fool" (2016)
6. "Fool to Cry" (1976)
7. "Angie" (1973)
8. "Beast of Burden" (1978)
9. "It's Only Rock 'n Roll (But I Like It)" (1974)
10. "Doom and Gloom" (2012)
11. "Love Is Strong" (1994)
12. "Mixed Emotions" (1989)
13. "Don't Stop" (2002)
14. "Harlem Shuffle" (1986)
15. "Happy" (1972)
16. "Rain Fall Down" (2005)
17. "Undercover of the Night" (1983)
18. "Emotional Rescue" (1980)
19. "Saint of Me" (1997)
20. "Wild Horses" featuring Florence Welch, live at London Stadium (2018)

== Charts ==
=== Weekly charts ===
Weekly chart performance for Honk
Chart (2019)	Peak position
Australian Albums (ARIA)	15
Austrian Albums (Ö3 Austria)	5
Belgian Albums (Ultratop Flanders)	6
Belgian Albums (Ultratop Wallonia)	13
Canadian Albums (Billboard)	38
Croatian International Albums (HDU)	1
Czech Albums (ČNS IFPI)	18
French Albums (SNEP)	26
Dutch Albums (Album Top 100)	12
German Albums (Offizielle Top 100)	6
Hungarian Albums (MAHASZ)	36
Irish Albums (IRMA)	30
Italian Albums (FIMI)	47
Japanese Albums (Oricon)	21
Polish Albums (ZPAV)	27
Portuguese Albums (AFP)	9
Scottish Albums (OCC)	2
Spanish Albums (PROMUSICAE)	8
Swiss Albums (Schweizer Hitparade)	6
UK Albums (OCC)	8
US Billboard 200	23
US Top Rock Albums (Billboard)	3

=== Year-end charts ===
Year-end chart performance for Honk
Chart (2019)	Position
Belgian Albums (Ultratop Flanders)	155
Belgian Albums (Ultratop Wallonia)	200
US Top Rock Albums (Billboard)	47

== Certifications ==
Certifications for Honk
Region	Certification	Certified units/sales
United Kingdom (BPI)	Gold	100,000^{‡}
^{‡} Sales+streaming figures based on certification alone.
