= Terrifying (song) =

Single by the Rolling Stones

from the album Steel Wheels
- B-side: "Wish I'd Never Met You"
- Released: March 1990 (EU); 23 July 1990 (UK)
- Recorded: March–June 1989
- Genre: Rock
- Length: 4:53
- Label: Rolling Stones
- Songwriter: Jagger/Richards
- Producers: Chris Kimsey; The Glimmer Twins

The Rolling Stones singles chronology
"Almost Hear You Sigh" (1989)	"Terrifying" (1990)	"Highwire" (1991)

Steel Wheels track listing
- 12 tracks Side one: 1. "Sad Sad Sad"; 2. "Mixed Emotions"; 3. "Terrifying"; 4. "Hold On to Your Hat"; 5. "Hearts for Sale"; 6. "Blinded by Love"; Side two: 7. "Rock and a Hard Place"; 8. "Can't Be Seen"; 9. "Almost Hear You Sigh"; 10. "Continental Drift"; 11. "Break the Spell"; 12. "Slipping Away"

"Terrifying" is a song by the English rock band the Rolling Stones from their 1989 album Steel Wheels.

== Details ==
It was written by Mick Jagger and Keith Richards. The song was also released as a single in 1990 and the B-side was "Wish I'd Never Met You", a non-album track that later was included on the group's 2005 compilation album Rarities 1971–2003.

"Terrifying" peaked at number 82 in the UK charts and at number eight on Billboard's Mainstream Rock Songs chart.

It is a mid-tempo song, performed at 143 beats per minute.

== Personnel ==
The Rolling Stones

- Mick Jagger – lead vocals, shakers
- Keith Richards – guitar, backing vocals
- Ronnie Wood – guitar
- Bill Wyman – bass guitar
- Charlie Watts – drums

Additional musicians

- Chuck Leavell – organ
- Matt Clifford – keyboards
- Lisa Fischer – backing vocals
- Roddy Lorimer – trumpet
- Nick Mason – rototoms (uncredited)
