= Mixed Emotions (Rolling Stones song) =

1989 single by the Rolling Stones

Single by the Rolling Stones

from the album Steel Wheels
- B-side: "Fancy Man Blues"
- Released: 21 August 1989
- Genre: Hard rock
- Length: 4:39 (album version); 4:00 (7-inch version)
- Label: Rolling Stones; CBS
- Songwriter: Jagger/Richards
- Producers: Chris Kimsey; the Glimmer Twins

The Rolling Stones singles chronology
"One Hit (To the Body)" (1986)	"Mixed Emotions" (1989)	"Rock and a Hard Place" (1989)

Steel Wheels track listing
- 12 tracks Side one: 1. "Sad Sad Sad"; 2. "Mixed Emotions"; 3. "Terrifying"; 4. "Hold On to Your Hat"; 5. "Hearts for Sale"; 6. "Blinded by Love"; Side two: 7. "Rock and a Hard Place"; 8. "Can't Be Seen"; 9. "Almost Hear You Sigh"; 10. "Continental Drift"; 11. "Break the Spell"; 12. "Slipping Away"

Music video
- "Mixed Emotions" on YouTube

"Mixed Emotions" is a song by English rock band the Rolling Stones from their 1989 album, Steel Wheels. Written by Mick Jagger and Keith Richards while on vacation on Montserrat, "Mixed Emotions" was a collaborative effort between Jagger and Richards after a period of tension and estrangement. Richards brought his own music to the sessions along with most of the song's lyrics, the rest being filled in by Jagger in the studio.

Released on 21 August 1989 in the United Kingdom, the song reached No. 1 on both the Canadian RPM 100 Singles chart and the US Billboard Album Rock Tracks chart. It also peaked at No. 5 on the Billboard Hot 100 and became a top-10 hit in Finland, the Netherlands, New Zealand and Norway.

== Recording ==
The song is an upfront rocker, with Richards, Jagger and Ronnie Wood sharing guitar duties. Charlie Watts handled drums while Bill Wyman played bass. Additional performers were piano and organ from Chuck Leavell, the Stones' touring keyboardist since the 1980s. Backing vocals are provided by Jagger, Richards, plus Sarah Dash, Lisa Fischer, and Bernard Fowler, the latter two longtime touring vocalists for the Stones. Brass was provided by the Kick Horns while Luis Jardim provided percussion.

== Release ==
Released as the album's first single on 21 August 1989, "Mixed Emotions" entered the top 10 on the US Billboard Hot 100, reaching number five, and was also a number-one hit on the Billboard Album Rock Tracks chart for five weeks and in Canada for one week. The song was the Stones' last top-10 hit in the United States, although they would go on to have more chart hits on the Album Rock Tracks chart. The single's B-side was "Fancy Man Blues", a non-album track recorded during the Steel Wheels sessions.

The song was regularly performed during the 1989–1990 Steel Wheels/Urban Jungle Tour and is included on the live albums Live at The Tokyo Dome and Steel Wheels Live. "Mixed Emotions" appears on all compilation albums, including Jump Back, Forty Licks, GRRR!, and Honk. The 12-inch remix of "Mixed Emotions" by producer Chris Kimsey was rereleased on the Rarities 1971–2003 compilation, in 2005, along with "Fancy Man Blues".

== Music video ==
To match the upbeat nature of the song, the music video featured the Stones, playful and smiling, performing the song as well as recording it. This stands in stark contrast to the band's previous video, 1986's "One Hit (To the Body)", filmed during a time when relations between Jagger and Richards were at an all-time low, and which featured uncomfortable physical sparring between the two.

== Track listing ==
1. "Mixed Emotions" (7-inch version) – 4:00
2. "Mixed Emotions" (Chris Kimsey's 12-inch) – 6:10
3. "Fancy Man Blues" – 4:54

== Personnel ==
Personnel are adapted from the Steel Wheels liner notes.

The Rolling Stones

- Mick Jagger – lead vocals, backing vocals, guitar, shakers
- Keith Richards – guitar, backing vocals
- Ronnie Wood – guitar
- Bill Wyman – bass guitar
- Charlie Watts – drums

Additional musicians

- Chuck Leavell – organ, piano
- Sarah Dash – backing vocals
- Lisa Fischer – backing vocals
- Bernard Fowler – backing vocals
- Luís Jardim – percussion
- The Kick Horns – brass

== Charts ==
=== Weekly charts ===
Chart (1989)	Peak position
Australia (ARIA)	25
Austria (Ö3 Austria Top 40)	17
Belgium (Ultratop 50 Flanders)	14
Canada Top Singles (RPM)	1
Europe (Eurochart Hot 100)	23
Finland (Suomen virallinen lista)	9
France (SNEP)	41
Ireland (IRMA)	17
Italy Airplay (Music & Media)	2
Netherlands (Dutch Top 40)	10
Netherlands (Single Top 100)	9
New Zealand (Recorded Music NZ)	9
Norway (VG-lista)	9
Sweden (Sverigetopplistan)	15
Switzerland (Schweizer Hitparade)	24
UK Singles (Official Charts)	36
US Billboard Hot 100	5
US Alternative Airplay (Billboard)	22
US Mainstream Rock (Billboard)	1
West Germany (GfK)	20

=== Year-end charts ===
Chart (1989)	Position
Canada Top Singles (RPM)	20
Netherlands (Dutch Top 40)	89
Netherlands (Single Top 100)	94
US Album Rock Tracks (Billboard)	38

== Release history ==
Region	Date	Format(s)	Label(s)	Ref.
United Kingdom	21 August 1989	7-inch vinyl; 12-inch vinyl; CD	Rolling Stones; CBS	
United Kingdom	28 August 1989	Limited-edition CD1	Rolling Stones; CBS	
United Kingdom	4 September 1989	Limited-edition CD2	Rolling Stones; CBS	
Japan	7 September 1989	Mini-CD	CBS/Sony	
United Kingdom	18 September 1989	Cassette	Rolling Stones; CBS	
