= Almost Hear You Sigh =

1990 song by The Rolling Stones

Single by the Rolling Stones

from the album Steel Wheels
- B-side: "Wish I'd Never Met You"; "Mixed Emotions"
- Released: 31 January 1990
- Length: 4:37; 4:10 (single edit)
- Label: Rolling Stones
- Songwriters: Mick Jagger; Keith Richards; Steve Jordan
- Producers: Chris Kimsey; the Glimmer Twins

The Rolling Stones singles chronology
"Rock and a Hard Place" (1989)	"Almost Hear You Sigh" (1990)	"Terrifying" (1989)

Steel Wheels track listing
- 12 tracks Side one: 1. "Sad Sad Sad"; 2. "Mixed Emotions"; 3. "Terrifying"; 4. "Hold On to Your Hat"; 5. "Hearts for Sale"; 6. "Blinded by Love"; Side two: 7. "Rock and a Hard Place"; 8. "Can't Be Seen"; 9. "Almost Hear You Sigh"; 10. "Continental Drift"; 11. "Break the Spell"; 12. "Slipping Away"

Music video
- "Almost Hear You Sigh" on YouTube

"Almost Hear You Sigh" is a song by English rock band the Rolling Stones from their 1989 album, Steel Wheels, written by Mick Jagger, Keith Richards, and Steve Jordan. The song was originally a contender for inclusion on Richards' first solo album, Talk Is Cheap, but he decided to play it for Jagger and Chris Kimsey the next year during recording sessions in Montserrat for the Steel Wheels album. With the exception of some lyrical alteration by Jagger, the composition was left in its original form. Released in January 1990 as the third single from Steel Wheels, the song reached No. 50 on the US Billboard Hot 100, No. 1 on the Billboard Album Rock Tracks chart, and No. 31 on the UK Singles Chart.

== Release and reception ==
Released as the album's third single in January 1990, "Almost Hear You Sigh" made it to No. 50 on the US Billboard Hot 100 and No. 1 for one week on the Billboard Album Rock Tracks chart. Given that the Rolling Stones' comeback 1989 North American tour had finished in December, the song got limited radio airplay. A music video was shot in black and white during the band's 1989 visit to Toronto, for two shows at the Skydome.

USA Today music critic Edna Gundersen noted that Jagger's vocals and Richards' guitar playing sounded best on slower Steel Wheels tracks such as "Almost Hear You Sigh". SF Weekly marks it as one of the Stones' best ballads recorded after 1971. However, Parry Gettelman of the Orlando Sentinel marked the track's Grammy nomination as that of a relatively uninspiring song.

== Live performances ==
The song has been performed only on the Urban Jungle Tour leg of the Steel Wheels/Urban Jungle Tour. Since its release, the song has been performed seven times on the 1989 tour, and on all shows of the 1990 tour.

== Personnel ==
Personnel are adapted from the Steel Wheels liner notes.

The Rolling Stones

- Mick Jagger – lead vocals, backing vocals
- Keith Richards – guitar, backing vocals, classical guitar
- Ronnie Wood – guitar, backing vocals
- Bill Wyman – bass guitar
- Charlie Watts – drums

Additional musicians

- Chuck Leavell – keyboards
- Matt Clifford – keyboards
- Sarah Dash – backing vocals
- Lisa Fischer – backing vocals
- Bernard Fowler – backing vocals
- Luís Jardim – percussion
- Chris Jagger – literary editor

== Charts ==
=== Weekly charts ===
Chart (1990)	Peak position
Belgium (Ultratop 50 Flanders)	27
Europe (Eurochart Hot 100)	66
Netherlands (Dutch Top 40)	13
Netherlands (Single Top 100)	11
UK Singles (OCC)	31
US Billboard Hot 100	50
US Mainstream Rock (Billboard)	1
West Germany (GfK)	58

=== Year-end charts ===
Chart (1990)	Position
US Album Rock Tracks (Billboard)	35

== Release history ==
Region	Date	Format(s)	Label(s)	Ref.
United States	31 January 1990	7-inch vinyl	Rolling Stones	
Japan	21 February 1990	Mini-CD	CBS/Sony	
Australia	19 March 1990	7-inch vinyl; cassette	Rolling Stones	
