= Slipping Away (Rolling Stones song) =

Song by the Rolling Stones

from the album Steel Wheels
- Released: 29 August 1989
- Recorded: March – June 1989
- Genre: Rock
- Length: 4:30
- Label: Rolling Stones/Virgin
- Songwriter: Jagger/Richards
- Producers: Chris Kimsey and The Glimmer Twins

Steel Wheels track listing
- 12 tracks Side one: 1. "Sad Sad Sad"; 2. "Mixed Emotions"; 3. "Terrifying"; 4. "Hold On to Your Hat"; 5. "Hearts for Sale"; 6. "Blinded by Love"; Side two: 7. "Rock and a Hard Place"; 8. "Can't Be Seen"; 9. "Almost Hear You Sigh"; 10. "Continental Drift"; 11. "Break the Spell"; 12. "Slipping Away"

"Slipping Away" is a song recorded by the English rock band the Rolling Stones. Written by Mick Jagger and Keith Richards, it is a ballad sung by Richards. It was included as the last track of the band's 1989 studio album Steel Wheels. The Stones have since performed "Slipping Away" during the 1995 leg of the Voodoo Lounge Tour, the 2002-2003 Licks Tour throughout the 2005-2007 A Bigger Bang Tour, on the 14 On Fire tour with former guitarist Mick Taylor guesting, and on the No Filter Tour.

== Music and lyrics ==
Mick Jagger and Keith Richards co-wrote "Slipping Away". The song was recorded by Christopher Marc Potter and Rupert Coulson at both AIR Studios, Montserrat and at Olympic Studios, London. It was mixed by Michael H. Brauer.

Musically, "Slipping Away" is a slow "dreamy" ballad song that features Richards as its lead vocalist, with Jagger singing backing vocals alongside Sarah Dash, Lisa Fischer, and Bernard Fowler. Richards and Ron Wood perform the song's rhythm guitar parts. Bill Wyman provides the prominent bass while Charlie Watts performs drums. The organ and piano are performed by Chuck Leavell and electric piano by Matt Clifford. The song's brass is provided by the Kick Horns.

Richards recorded a re-worked acoustic version for the 1995 live album Stripped. Of the song he said at the time, "(When we recorded it for Stripped) we realized, 'Wow, that song kind of slipped away.' It just kind of tailed off at the end of Steel Wheels. We realized what potential it still had, and the band and especially the horn guys said, 'You've got to do that!' So in a way, I agreed to do it at gun point. But when I got into it, I really liked singing that song. It's got some depth."

== Critical reception ==
In a retrospective article looking over Richards' 20 greatest songs, Rolling Stone's Jon Dolan et al. ranked it number 5, writing that "Slipping Away" was a "moving" song and "somber closing track" for Steel Wheels. In 2019, Jon Dolan wrote in Rolling Stone that "Slipping Away" was the "best song" of the album. Vulture ranked "Slipping Away" in 2017 as the band's 320th best song of all time. Billboard's Joe Lynch wrote that the quality of the song was "enough to prove that even without the Stones, [Richards] could have enjoyed a solo career of renown and relevance".

== Personnel ==
According to the authors Philippe Margotin and Jean-Michel Guesdon.

The Rolling Stones

- Keith Richards – vocals, rhythm guitar, acoustic guitar
- Mick Jagger – backing vocals
- Ronnie Wood – rhythm guitar
- Bill Wyman – bass guitar
- Charlie Watts – drums

Additional personnel

- Chuck Leavell – piano, organ
- Matt Clifford – electric piano, strings
- Sarah Dash – backing vocals
- Lisa Fischer – backing vocals
- Bernard Fowler – backing vocals
- The Kick Horns – horns
- Unknown musician – tambourine

Technical

- Chris Kimsey – producer
- The Glimmer Twins – producers
- Christopher Marc Potter – engineer
- Rupert Coulson – assistant engineer
- Michael Brauer – mixer
