= Rarities 1971–2003 =

Compilation album by The Rolling Stones
- Released: 21 November 2005
- Recorded: 1971–2003
- Genre: Rock
- Length: 79:30
- Label: Virgin
- Producer: The Glimmer Twins; Chris Kimsey; Jimmy Miller; Don Was

The Rolling Stones chronology
A Bigger Bang (2005)	Rarities 1971–2003 (2005)	Shine a Light (2008)

Rarities 1971–2003 is a compilation album by the Rolling Stones that was released in 2005 worldwide by Virgin Records – as well as by the coffee-chain Starbucks in North America – and features a selection of rare and obscure material recorded between 1971 and 2003. The album peaked at No. 76 on the Billboard chart.

Several B-sides were included, such as "Fancy Man Blues", "Anyway You Look at It", "Wish I'd Never Met You", "Through the Lonely Nights", and the band's live rendition of Chuck Berry's "Let It Rock" from 1971.

Track 3, "Wild Horses" (live), from Stripped, and Tracks 6 and 15, taken from the 1981 compilation Sucking in the Seventies, appeared on previously released albums.

In the liner notes, Ronnie Wood acknowledges...

There are songs we've done for albums in the past that I've thought, oh, it's a shame that song didn't make the album. Then you get carried away with promoting it and you forget about it.

== Cover art ==
Although the cover image is from 1978 (from the music video for "Respectable") it only shows the current four members of the band and does not feature bassist Bill Wyman, who was removed from the picture; the original colour image can be seen in the booklet from Forty Licks, showing him standing in the back behind Jagger and Richards.

== Release and reception ==
Professional ratings
Review scores
Source	Rating
AllMusic	3/5 stars
Rolling Stone	4/5 stars
Tom Hull	B

Stephen Thomas Erlewine of AllMusic writes "Rarities 1971–2003 isn't exactly the clearing-house of outtakes, rarities, and B-sides that fans have been waiting for. Not only are there plenty of heavily bootlegged outtakes such as "Blood Red Wine", "Claudine", and "Brown Sugar" with Eric Clapton on guitar missing, but there are plenty of B-sides from these three decades missing." (Notably, "Claudine" and the rare version of "Brown Sugar" were later released on the Deluxe Special Editions of Some Girls and Sticky Fingers.) Another glaring omission was the B-side only track "I Think I'm Going Mad", from the 1984 single for "She Was Hot".

== Track listing ==
All songs by Mick Jagger and Keith Richards, except where noted.

1. "Fancy Man Blues" – 4:48
  - B-side to "Mixed Emotions" in 1989
2. "Tumbling Dice" (Live) – 4:02
  - Hybrid rehearsal/live version, originally intended to be included on Stripped; previously released on the "Wild Horses" single (1996); backstage rehearsal portion recorded at the Paradiso, Amsterdam, 26 or 27 May 1995; live performance recorded at the Olympia, Paris, 3 July 1995
3. "Wild Horses" (Live Stripped Version) – 5:10
  - Originally appeared on Stripped, recorded in rehearsals at EMI-Toshiba Studio, Tokyo, March 1995
4. "Beast of Burden" (Live) – 5:04
  - Live version that originally appeared as the B-side to "Going to a Go-Go" in 1982; recorded live at the Rosemont Horizon, Illinois, 25 November 1981
5. "Anyway You Look at It" – 4:20
  - B-side to "Saint of Me" in 1998
6. "If I Was a Dancer (Dance Pt. 2)" (Mick Jagger, Keith Richards, Ronnie Wood) – 5:50
  - An Emotional Rescue outtake that originally appeared on 1981's Sucking in the Seventies
7. "Miss You" (Dance Version) – 7:32
  - "Special Disco Version" from 1978 originally ran 8:36; this version has been edited.
8. "Wish I'd Never Met You" – 4:39
  - B-side to "Terrifying" in 1990
9. "I Just Wanna Make Love to You" (Live) (Willie Dixon) – 3:55
  - Originally appeared as "I Just Want to Make Love to You" as one of the tracks of the B-side of the Maxi-Single "Highwire" in 1991, recorded live at the Wembley Stadium on 6 July 1990
10. "Mixed Emotions" (12" Version) – 6:12
  - Maxi-Single. Originally appeared as "Mixed Emotions" (Chris Kimsey's 12") in 1989
11. "Through the Lonely Nights" – 4:12
  - B-side to "It's Only Rock 'n Roll (But I Like It)" in 1974
12. "Live with Me" (Live) – 3:47
  - B-side of "Wild Horses" single from 1996, recorded live at Brixton Academy, London, 19 July 1995
13. "Let It Rock" (Live) (Chuck Berry) – 2:46
  - Originally released as an additional track on the B-side of "Brown Sugar" from 1971 in the UK only, recorded live at the University of Leeds, 13 March 1971. Also released on the Spanish 1971 version of Sticky Fingers.
14. "Harlem Shuffle" (NY Mix) (Bob Relf, Earl Nelson) – 5:48
  - Extended Remix. This version has been edited; the original 12" release ran 6:35
15. "Mannish Boy" (Live) (McKinley Morganfield, Ellas McDaniel, Mel London) – 4:28
  - Live recording from Love You Live / edit from Sucking in the Seventies, originally performed at El Mocambo, Toronto, March 1977
16. "Thru and Thru" (Live) – 6:39
  - Recorded live January 2003 at a Madison Square Garden performance featured on the DVD set Four Flicks

== Personnel ==
The Rolling Stones

- Mick Jagger – vocals, guitars
- Keith Richards – guitars, vocals
- Charlie Watts – drums
- Ronnie Wood – guitar, bass guitar, drums, vocals; except on "Through the Lonely Nights" and "Let It Rock"
- Bill Wyman – bass guitar; except on "Tumbling Dice" (Live), "Wild Horses" (Live Stripped Version), "Live with Me" (Live), "Anyway You Look At It" and "Thru and Thru" (Live)
- Mick Taylor – guitars on "Through the Lonely Nights" and "Let It Rock"

Additional musicians

- Billy Preston – electric piano and vocals on "Mannish Boy"
- Lázár János – herepacsi and backing vocals on "Thru and Thru".
- Nicky Hopkins – piano on "Through the Lonely Nights"
- Darryl Jones – bass guitar on "Tumbling Dice" (Live), "Wild Horses" (Live Stripped Version), "Live with Me" (Live), "Anyway You Look at It" and "Thru and Thru" (Live)
- Matt Clifford – keyboards on "Wish I'd Never Met You" and "Mixed Emotions"
- Chuck Leavell – keyboards, vocals on "Fancy Man Blues", "Tumbling Dice" (Live), "Wild Horses" (Live Stripped Version), "Anyway You Look At It", "Wish I'd Never Met You", "Mixed Emotions", "Live with Me" (Live), "Harlem Shuffle" and "Thru and Thru"

== Charts ==
Chart performance for Rarities 1971–2003
Chart (2005)	Peak position
Austrian Albums (Ö3 Austria)	69
Dutch Albums (Album Top 100)	59
French Albums (SNEP)	110
German Albums (Offizielle Top 100)	80
Italian Albums (FIMI)	63
Swedish Albums (Sverigetopplistan)	56
US Billboard 200	76
