= Flashpoint (album) =

Live album by the Rolling Stones
- Released: 8 April 1991
- Recorded: 25 November 1989–28 July 1990; 7–11 January 1991 (studio tracks)
- Genre: Rock
- Length: 76:12
- Label: Rolling Stones/Sony
- Producers: Chris Kimsey, The Glimmer Twins

The Rolling Stones chronology
Steel Wheels (1989)	Flashpoint (1991)	Jump Back: The Best of The Rolling Stones (1993)

Singles from Flashpoint
- 1. "Highwire" Released: 4 March 1991; 2. "Ruby Tuesday" Released: 24 May 1991; 3. "Sex Drive" Released: 19 August 1991

Flashpoint is a live album by the English rock band the Rolling Stones, their first since 1982's Still Life. Compiled from performances on the Steel Wheels/Urban Jungle Tour by Chris Kimsey with the assistance of Chris Potter, it was released in 1991. Steel Wheels Live (2020) includes a complete 1989 concert along with a selection of live rarities.

The tour and the two studio tracks recorded for Flashpoint were the last for bassist and long-time member Bill Wyman as a Rolling Stone.

== History ==
Recorded across North America, Europe and Japan, Flashpoint is also the first Rolling Stones release of the 1990s and, unlike previous live sets, includes two new studio tracks. "Highwire" had been released as a single earlier in 1991 and was a comment on the Gulf War. "Sex Drive" was described by Chris Jagger – Mick's brother – as "basically a dance-track", and got a release in July of that year as the third and last single from the album.

Although the live selections are mostly familiar hits mixed in with new tracks from Steel Wheels, Flashpoint also includes lesser-known songs like "Factory Girl" from 1968's Beggars Banquet and "Little Red Rooster", originally a No. 1 UK hit single in 1964, featured here with special guest Eric Clapton on guitar. According to Chris Jagger, some of the backing vocals were re-recorded and Ron Wood added guitar to three tracks afterwards.

Flashpoint was recorded using binaural recording. This gives the effect that the concert audience is behind the home listener when heard on headphones.

A snippet was taken from the band's 1970 live album Get Yer Ya-Ya's Out!, where a fan shouts: "'Paint It Black', 'Paint It Black', you devil". It is audible between "Ruby Tuesday" and "You Can't Always Get What You Want".

=== Bill Wyman's departure ===
As Flashpoint was the Rolling Stones' final release under their contract with Sony Music, the band signed a new lucrative long-term worldwide deal with Virgin Records in 1991, with the exception of Bill Wyman.

After 30 years with the band, the 55-year-old Wyman decided that he had other interests he wanted to pursue and felt that, considering the size of the recently completed Steel Wheels project and tour, it was fitting to bow out at that time.

Although he would not officially announce his departure until January 1993 – during the interim the rest of the band had repeatedly asked him to reconsider – he had talked about leaving the band for at least ten years.

After Wyman's departure, Ronnie Wood was taken off salary and made a full member of the Rolling Stones partnership, 18 years after he joined the band.

== Release ==
Professional ratings
Review scores
Source	Rating
AllMusic	2/5 stars
Entertainment Weekly	F
Los Angeles Times	3/4 stars
MusicHound Rock	1/5 stars
Rolling Stone	4/5 stars
The Rolling Stone Album Guide	3/5 stars
Tom Hull	B+

Flashpoint was released in late March 1991 and was generally well-received, with "Highwire" becoming a rock radio hit, and managed to reach No. 6 in the UK and No. 16 in the US, where it went gold.

In 1998, Flashpoint was remastered and reissued by Virgin Records, and again in 2010 by Universal Music.

== Track listing ==
All tracks written by Mick Jagger and Keith Richards, except where noted.

=== CD ===
1. "(Intro) Continental Drift" – 0:26
2. "Start Me Up" – 3:54 (26 November 1989; Memorial Stadium; Clemson, South Carolina)
3. "Sad Sad Sad" – 3:33 (19 December 1989; Atlantic City Convention Center; Atlantic City, New Jersey)
4. "Miss You" – 5:55 (25 November 1989; Gator Bowl; Jacksonville, Florida)
5. "Rock and a Hard Place" – 4:52 (25 November 1989; Gator Bowl; Jacksonville, Florida)
6. "Ruby Tuesday" – 3:33 (25 February 1990; Tokyo Dome; Tokyo, Japan)
7. "You Can't Always Get What You Want" – 7:26 (25 November 1989; Gator Bowl; Jacksonville, Florida)
8. "Factory Girl" – 2:47 (6 July 1990; Wembley Stadium; London, England)
9. "Can't Be Seen" – 4:17 (26 November 1989; Memorial Stadium; Clemson, South Carolina)
10. "Little Red Rooster" (Willie Dixon) – 5:15 (19 December 1989; Atlantic City Convention Center; Atlantic City, New Jersey)
11. "Paint It Black" – 4:02 (13 June 1990; Olympic Stadium; Barcelona, Spain)
12. "Sympathy for the Devil" – 5:35 (26 February 1990; Tokyo Dome; Tokyo, Japan)
13. "Brown Sugar" – 4:06 (29 July 1990; Stadio Delle Alpi; Turin, Italy)
14. "Jumpin' Jack Flash" – 5:00 (27 February 1990; Tokyo Dome; Tokyo, Japan)
15. "(I Can't Get No) Satisfaction" – 6:09 (26 November 1989; Memorial Stadium; Clemson, South Carolina)
16. "Highwire" – 4:44
17. "Sex Drive" – 5:07

"Rock and a Hard Place" and "Can't Be Seen", were not included on the vinyl version.

=== Cassette Tape ===
Side one

1. (Intro) "Continental Drift" – 0:29
2. "Start Me Up" – 3:54
3. "Sad Sad Sad" – 3:33
4. "Miss You" – 5:55
5. "Rock and a Hard Place" – 4:52
6. "Ruby Tuesday" – 3:34
7. "You Can't Always Get What You Want" – 7:26
8. "Factory Girl" – 2:48
9. "Sex Drive" – 4:28

Side two

1. "Can't Be Seen" – 4:17
2. "Little Red Rooster" (Dixon) – 5:15
3. "Paint It Black" – 4:02
4. "Sympathy for the Devil" – 5:35
5. "Brown Sugar" – 4:10
6. "Jumpin' Jack Flash" – 5:00
7. "(I Can't Get No) Satisfaction" – 6:08
8. "Highwire" – 4:46

== Other songs/B-sides and charity single ==
The following songs were recorded during the same set of concerts and later released as B-sides:

- "2000 Light Years from Home" – 3:24 (13 June 1990; Olympic Stadium; Barcelona Spain) – Only released on "Highwire" singles
- "Gimme Shelter" – 4:47 (26 November 1989; Memorial Stadium; Clemson, South Carolina) – Charity single released in 1993
- "Harlem Shuffle" (Bob Relf, Ernest Nelson) – 4:35 (27 February 1990; Korakuen Dome; Tokyo, Japan) – Only released on one of the variations of the UK "Ruby Tuesday" single
- "I Just Want to Make Love to You" (Dixon) – 3:58 (6 July 1990; Wembley Stadium; London, England) – Only released on "Highwire" singles
- "Play with Fire" (Nanker Phelge) – 3:31 (26 November 1989; Memorial Stadium; Clemson, South Carolina) – Released on "Ruby Tuesday" single
- "Street Fighting Man" – 3:43 (25 August 1990; Wembley Stadium; London, England) – Only released on "Jumpin' Jack Flash" Maxi-CD singles
- "Tumbling Dice" – 4:12 (24 August 1990; Wembley Stadium; London, England) – Only released on "Jumpin' Jack Flash" singles
- "Undercover of the Night" – 3:59 (19 December 1989; Atlantic City Convention Center; Atlantic City, New Jersey) – Released on the "Ruby Tuesday" single

All tracks besides "Gimme Shelter" released in 1990.

== Personnel ==
The Rolling Stones

- Mick Jagger – lead vocals, guitars, harmonica
- Keith Richards – vocals, guitars
- Ronnie Wood – guitars
- Bill Wyman – bass guitar
- Charlie Watts – drums

Additional personnel

- Matt Clifford – keyboards, French horn
- Chuck Leavell – keyboards, backing vocals
- Bobby Keys – saxophone
- Horns by The Uptown Horns – Arno Hecht, Paul Litteral, Bob Funk, Crispin Cioe
- The Kick Horns - horns on "Rock and a Hard Place"
- Bernard Fowler – backing vocals
- Lisa Fischer – backing vocals
- Cindy Mizelle – backing vocals
- Lorelei McBroom- backing vocals
- Eric Clapton – guitar on "Little Red Rooster"
- Live recordings by Bob Clearmountain, David Hewitt
- Mastered by Bob Ludwig at Gateway Mastering Studios
- Mixed by Christopher Marc Potter
- Bernard Fowler – backing vocals on "Highwire"
- Katie Kissoon – backing vocals on "Sex Drive"
- Tessa Niles – backing vocals on "Sex Drive"
- Studio tracks mixed by Chris Kimsey and Mark Stent
- Engineered by Mark Stent
- Assistant Engineer Nick Hartley on "Sex Drive" and "Highwire"
- Art direction and design by Garry Mouat and David Crow

== Charts ==
=== Weekly charts ===
Weekly chart performance for Flashpoint
Chart (1991)	Peak position
Australian Albums (ARIA)	12
Austrian Albums (Ö3 Austria)	6
Canada Top Albums/CDs (RPM)	9
Dutch Albums (Album Top 100)	5
Finland (The Official Finnish Charts)	6
German Albums (Offizielle Top 100)	5
Italian Albums (Musica e Dischi)	19
Japanese Albums (Oricon)	4
New Zealand Albums (RMNZ)	6
Norwegian Albums (VG-lista)	11
Swedish Albums (Sverigetopplistan)	15
Swiss Albums (Schweizer Hitparade)	7
UK Albums (Official Charts)	6
US Billboard 200	16

1998 weekly chart performance for Flashpoint
Chart (1998)	Peak position
Belgian Albums (Ultratop Flanders)	42
Dutch Albums (Album Top 100)	33
Swedish Albums (Sverigetopplistan)	29

2001 weekly chart performance for Flashpoint
Chart (2001)	Peak position
French Albums (SNEP)	129

=== Year-end charts ===
Year-end chart performance for Flashpoint
Chart (1991)	Position
Dutch Albums (Album Top 100)	12
German Albums (Offizielle Top 100)	40
Swiss Albums (Schweizer Hitparade)	27

== Certifications ==
Certifications for Flashpoint
Region	Certification	Certified units/sales
Austria (IFPI Austria)	Gold	25,000^{*}
Canada (Music Canada)	Gold	50,000^{^}
Germany (BVMI)	Gold	250,000^{^}
Netherlands (NVPI)	Platinum	100,000^{^}
New Zealand (RMNZ)	Platinum	15,000^{‡}
Switzerland (IFPI Switzerland)	Gold	25,000^{^}
United Kingdom (BPI)	Gold	100,000^{‡}
United States (RIAA)	Gold	500,000^{^}
^{*} Sales figures based on certification alone.^{^} Shipments figures based on certification alone.^{‡} Sales+streaming figures based on certification alone.
