= Jump Back: The Best of the Rolling Stones '71–'93 =

Jump Back: The Best of The Rolling Stones '71–'93
- British cover

Greatest hits album by the Rolling Stones
- Released: 22 November 1993
- Recorded: December 1969 – June 1989
- Genre: Rock
- Length: 75:43
- Label: Virgin
- Producer: Jimmy Miller; The Glimmer Twins; Chris Kimsey; Steve Lillywhite

The Rolling Stones chronology
Flashpoint (1991)	Jump Back: The Best of The Rolling Stones '71–'93 (1993)	Voodoo Lounge (1994)

American cover

Jump Back: The Best of The Rolling Stones '71–'93 is the sixth official compilation album by the Rolling Stones. It was initially released worldwide, except in the US, in 1993. The American release came on 24 August 2004.

It was the first Rolling Stones compilation packaged in the compact disc era, and covered the band's career from 1971's Sticky Fingers to then-most recent studio album Steel Wheels in 1989. It was also the band's first release under their contract with Virgin Records, which had been signed in November 1993, while Voodoo Lounge was being recorded. The album reached No. 16 in the UK and became an enduring seller. Despite its very belated release in the US in 2004, it managed to peak at No. 30 and go platinum.

The album artwork was designed by Bill Smith with an inner sleeve collage designed by Len Peltier.

In 2009 it was remastered and reissued by Universal Music, with the album version of "Miss You" being included in place of the single version.

All 18 tracks also appear on the 2019 compilation Honk.

== Track listing ==
All songs by Mick Jagger and Keith Richards, except where noted.

Jump Back: The Best of The Rolling Stones '71–'93 track listing
No.	Title	Original album	Length
1.	"Start Me Up"	Tattoo You, 1981	3:34
2.	"Brown Sugar"	Sticky Fingers, 1971	3:48
3.	"Harlem Shuffle" (Bobby Relf and Earl Nelson)	Dirty Work, 1986	3:25
4.	"It's Only Rock 'n Roll"	It's Only Rock 'n Roll, 1974	5:07
5.	"Mixed Emotions" (Single version)	Steel Wheels, 1989	4:01
6.	"Angie"	Goats Head Soup, 1973	4:31
7.	"Tumbling Dice"	Exile on Main St., 1972	3:45
8.	"Fool to Cry" (Sucking in the Seventies edit)	Black and Blue, 1976	4:06
9.	"Rock and a Hard Place" (Single version)	Steel Wheels	4:05
10.	"Miss You"	Some Girls, 1978	4:48
11.	"Hot Stuff" (Sucking in the Seventies edit)	Black and Blue	3:30
12.	"Emotional Rescue"	Emotional Rescue, 1980	5:39
13.	"Respectable"	Some Girls	3:07
14.	"Beast of Burden" (Sucking in the Seventies edit)	Some Girls	3:28
15.	"Waiting on a Friend"	Tattoo You	4:35
16.	"Wild Horses"	Sticky Fingers	5:43
17.	"Bitch"	Sticky Fingers	3:36
18.	"Undercover of the Night"	Undercover, 1983	4:33

== Charts ==
=== Weekly charts ===
Weekly chart performance for Jump Back: The Best of The Rolling Stones '71–'93
Chart (1993–1994)	Peak position
Austrian Albums (Ö3 Austria)	14
Finnish Albums (Soumen Virallinen)	13
French Albums (SNEP)	6
German Albums (Offizielle Top 100)	19
New Zealand Albums (RMNZ)	4
Norwegian Albums (VG-lista)	15
Swedish Albums (Sverigetopplistan)	10
Swiss Albums (Schweizer Hitparade)	18
UK Albums (OCC)	16

1995 weekly chart performance for Jump Back: The Best of The Rolling Stones '71–'93
Chart (1995)	Peak position
Australian Albums (ARIA)	9
Belgian Albums (Ultratop Flanders)	18
Belgian Albums (Ultratop Wallonia)	25
Dutch Albums (Album Top 100)	10
Swiss Albums (Schweizer Hitparade)	26
UK Albums (OCC)	21

1998 weekly chart performance for Jump Back: The Best of The Rolling Stones '71–'93
Chart (1998)	Peak position
German Albums (Offizielle Top 100)	40

2001 weekly chart performance for Jump Back: The Best of The Rolling Stones '71–'93
Chart (2001)	Peak position
Italian Albums (FIMI)	36

2004 weekly chart performance for Jump Back: The Best of The Rolling Stones '71–'93
Chart (2004)	Peak position
US Billboard 200	30

2010 weekly chart performance for Jump Back: The Best of The Rolling Stones '71–'93
Chart (2010)	Peak position
Spanish Albums (Promusicae)	81

2012 weekly chart performance for Jump Back: The Best of The Rolling Stones '71–'93
Chart (2012)	Peak position
French Albums (SNEP)	159

2014 weekly chart performance for Jump Back: The Best of The Rolling Stones '71–'93
Chart (2014)	Peak position
Italian Albums (FIMI)	95

2016 weekly chart performance for Jump Back: The Best of The Rolling Stones '71–'93
Chart (2016)	Peak position
Polish Albums (ZPAV)	1

=== Year-end charts ===
2005 year-end chart performance for Jump Back: The Best of The Rolling Stones '71–'93
Chart (2005)	Position
US Billboard 200	174

== Certifications ==
Certifications for Jump Back: The Best of The Rolling Stones '71–'93
Region	Certification	Certified units/sales
Argentina (CAPIF)	Gold	30,000^{^}
Australia (ARIA)	4× Platinum	280,000^{‡}
Austria (IFPI Austria)	Gold	25,000^{*}
Belgium (BRMA)	Platinum	50,000^{*}
Brazil (Pro-Música Brasil)	Gold	100,000^{*}
France (SNEP)	Platinum	300,000^{*}
Germany (BVMI)	Gold	250,000^{^}
Netherlands (NVPI)	Platinum	100,000^{^}
New Zealand (RMNZ)	Platinum	15,000^{^}
Poland (ZPAV)	Platinum	20,000^{‡}
Sweden (GLF)	Gold	50,000^{^}
Switzerland (IFPI Switzerland)	Platinum	50,000^{^}
United Kingdom (BPI)	2× Platinum	600,000^{^}
United States (RIAA)	Platinum	1,000,000^{^}
Uruguay (CUD)	Gold	3,000^{^}
^{*} Sales figures based on certification alone.^{^} Shipments figures based on certification alone.^{‡} Sales+streaming figures based on certification alone.
