= Rock and a Hard Place (Rolling Stones song) =

1989 single by the Rolling Stones

Single by The Rolling Stones

from the album Steel Wheels
- B-side: "Cook Cook Blues"
- Released: October 1989
- Length: 5:25 (album version); 4:05 (Single version); 6:57 (12-inch version)
- Label: Rolling Stones; CBS
- Songwriter: Jagger/Richards
- Producers: Chris Kimsey; the Glimmer Twins

The Rolling Stones singles chronology
"Mixed Emotions" (1989)	"Rock and a Hard Place" (1989)	"Almost Hear You Sigh" (1990)

Music video
- "Rock and a Hard Place" on YouTube

Steel Wheels track listing
- 12 tracks Side one: 1. "Sad Sad Sad"; 2. "Mixed Emotions"; 3. "Terrifying"; 4. "Hold On to Your Hat"; 5. "Hearts for Sale"; 6. "Blinded by Love"; Side two: 7. "Rock and a Hard Place"; 8. "Can't Be Seen"; 9. "Almost Hear You Sigh"; 10. "Continental Drift"; 11. "Break the Spell"; 12. "Slipping Away"

"Rock and a Hard Place" is a song by English rock band the Rolling Stones from their 1989 album, Steel Wheels. It was released as the second single from the album and remains the band's most recent top-40 hit in the United States as of 2026, peaking at number 23 on the Billboard Hot 100 chart.

== Recording ==
Credited to Mick Jagger and Keith Richards, "Rock and a Hard Place" was recorded at Montserrat's AIR Studios and London's Olympic Studios in the spring months of 1989. On the song, Richards said in the liner notes to the 1993 compilation album Jump Back (on which it was included), "This was like going back to the way we worked in the early days, before Exile, when we were living round the corner from each other in London. Mick and I hadn't got together in four years since Dirty Work, but as soon as we met up in Barbados for a fortnight, with a couple guitars and pianos, everything was fine." At the time of release, Jagger said, "This is one of those songs like 'Start Me Up', where the minute you hear the opening notes, you head for the dance floor. It's real '70s, in the best possible way."

With Jagger on lead vocals, Richards, Ron Wood and Jagger perform guitars for the recording. Bill Wyman and Charlie Watts perform bass and drums, respectively. Keyboards are played by Matt Clifford and Chuck Leavell. The Kick Horns provided brass for the recording. Lisa Fischer, Sarah Dash and Bernard Fowler all perform backing vocals.

== Release ==
"Rock and a Hard Place" was released as the second single from Steel Wheels on 6 November 1989 in the United Kingdom. "Cook Cook Blues", a slow blues outtake from the 1983 album Undercover, was the B-side. The single reached No. 63 in the UK, No. 23 in the US and No. 1 on the Mainstream Rock Tracks chart. The song has been performed by the Stones sporadically since its release, appearing on the Steel Wheels/Urban Jungle Tour, Voodoo Lounge Tour, Bridges to Babylon Tour, and Licks Tour.

== Music video ==
A music video was shot at Sullivan Stadium, in Foxborough, Massachusetts during the band's three sold out night stand at that venue and directed by Wayne Isham. The video reached the Top 10 of MTV's Top 20 Video Countdown in December 1989.

== Live performances ==
A live recording captured during the Steel Wheels/Urban Jungle Tour was included on the live albums Flashpoint, Live at The Tokyo Dome and Steel Wheels Live.

== Track listing ==
1. "Rock and a Hard Place" – 4:05
2. "Cook Cook Blues" – 4:08

== Personnel ==
Adapted from Steel Wheels liner notes.

The Rolling Stones

- Mick Jagger – lead vocals, guitar
- Keith Richards – guitar
- Ronnie Wood – guitar
- Bill Wyman – bass guitar
- Charlie Watts – drums

Additional musicians

- Chuck Leavell – keyboards
- Matt Clifford – keyboards
- Sarah Dash – backing vocals
- Lisa Fischer – backing vocals
- Bernard Fowler – backing vocals
- The Kick Horns – brass

== Charts ==
=== Weekly charts ===
Weekly chart performance for "Rock and a Hard Place"
Chart (1989–1990)	Peak position
Australia (ARIA)	99
Canada Top Singles (RPM)	10
Netherlands (Dutch Top 40)	27
Netherlands (Single Top 100)	23
UK Singles (Official Charts)	63
US Billboard Hot 100	23
US Mainstream Rock (Billboard)	1

=== Year-end charts ===
Year-end chart performance for "Rock and a Hard Place"
Chart (1989)	Position
US Album Rock Tracks (Billboard)	32

== Release history ==
Release dates and formats for "Rock and a Hard Place"
Region	Date	Format(s)	Label(s)	Ref.
United States	October 1989	7-inch vinyl; 12-inch vinyl; cassette	Rolling Stones; CBS	
United Kingdom	6 November 1989	7-inch vinyl; 12-inch vinyl; CD1	Rolling Stones; CBS	
United Kingdom	20 November 1989	CD2; cassette	Rolling Stones; CBS	
Japan	1 December 1989	Mini-CD	Rolling Stones; CBS/Sony	
