= Highwire (song) =

1991 single by the Rolling Stones

Single by the Rolling Stones

from the album Flashpoint
- B-side: "2000 Light Years from Home" (live)
- Released: 4 March 1991
- Recorded: 7–18 January 1991
- Studio: Hit Factory (London, England)
- Genre: Heartland rock
- Length: 3:41
- Label: Rolling Stones
- Songwriter: Jagger/Richards
- Producers: Chris Kimsey, The Glimmer Twins

The Rolling Stones singles chronology
"Terrifying" (1990)	"Highwire" (1991)	"Ruby Tuesday (live)" (1991)

Music video
- "Highwire" on YouTube

"Highwire" is an anti-war song by English rock band the Rolling Stones, featured on their 1991 live album, Flashpoint. Written by Mick Jagger and Keith Richards, the song is one of the rare examples of the Stones taking on political issues—in this case, the fall-out from Persian Gulf War.

"Highwire" was released as Flashpoint's first single on 4 March 1991. It reached number four in Finland, Norway, and Portugal, number six in the Netherlands, number 10 in Canada, and number 57 in the United States. In the latter country, the single peaked at number one on the Billboard Album Rock Tracks chart for three weeks. An accompanying video directed by Julien Temple was released and depicts the Stones in an industrial set performing the song.

== Background ==
On the song, Jagger said at the time of its release, "It's not about the war. It's about how it started." His brother Chris Jagger noted "it is a sideways swipe at the policies surrounding the Gulf War". Richards continued, saying, "This is not about the war. It's about how you build up some shaky dictator. You can't build them up, 'cause then you've got to slam them down."

The song's lyrics deconstructs the build-up to the war and criticises the politics behind it:

We sell 'em missiles, We sell 'em tanks; We give 'em credit, You can call the bank; It's just a business, You can pay us in crude; You love these toys, just go play out your feuds; Got no pride, don't know whose boots to lick; We act so greedy, makes me sick sick sick.

We walk the highwire; Sending the men up to the front line; Hoping they don't catch the hell fire; With hot guns and cold, cold lies.

== Critical reception ==
Pan-European magazine Music & Media wrote, "Still controversial after all these years -- that is a compliment in itself. This antiwar song sounds as if it was recorded in the days of Exile On Main Street. Richards's mean guitar riff underpins Jagger's biting vocals. No DJ can possibly deny the strong impact of it."

== Music video ==
The accompanying music video for "Highwire" shows the band members performing against an industrial backdrop. The video did not feature Bill Wyman, leading to speculation that he had left the band. "Highwire" proved to be his penultimate single release with the band (he reappeared for the promotional video of the single "Sex Drive"), although his departure was not confirmed until 1993.

== Personnel ==
According to the authors Philippe Margotin and Jean-Michel Guesdon.

The Rolling Stones

- Mick Jagger – vocals, rhythm guitar
- Keith Richards – rhythm and lead guitar
- Ronnie Wood – guitar
- Bill Wyman – bass guitar
- Charlie Watts – drums

Additional personnel

- Bernard Fowler – backing vocals

Technical

- Chris Kimsey – producer
- The Glimmer Twins – producers
- Mark Stent – engineer
- Charlie Smith – engineer

== Charts ==
=== Weekly charts ===
Weekly chart performance for "Highwire"
Chart (1991)	Peak position
Australia (ARIA)	54
Austria (Ö3 Austria Top 40)	23
Belgium (Ultratop 50 Flanders)	13
Canada Top Singles (RPM)	10
Europe (Eurochart Hot 100)	21
Europe (European Hit Radio)	8
Finland (Suomen virallinen lista)	4
France (SNEP)	28
Germany (GfK)	27
Ireland (IRMA)	16
Luxembourg (Radio Luxembourg)	1
Netherlands (Dutch Top 40)	8
Netherlands (Single Top 100)	6
New Zealand (Recorded Music NZ)	32
Norway (VG-lista)	4
Portugal (AFP)	4
Sweden (Sverigetopplistan)	14
Switzerland (Schweizer Hitparade)	14
UK Singles (Official Charts)	29
UK Airplay (Music Week)	11
US Billboard Hot 100	57
US Alternative Airplay (Billboard)	28
US Mainstream Rock (Billboard)	1
US Cash Box Top 100	49
US AOR Tracks (Radio & Records)	1

=== Year-end charts ===
Year-end chart performance for "Highwire"
Chart (1991)	Position
Canada Top Singles (RPM)	89
Europe (European Hit Radio)	63
Italy (Musica e dischi)	98
Netherlands (Dutch Top 40)	82
Netherlands (Single Top 100)	75
Sweden (Topplistan)	95
US Album Rock Tracks (Billboard)	35

== Release history ==
Release dates and formats for "Highwire"
Region	Date	Format(s)	Label(s)	Ref.
United States	4 March 1991	7-inch vinyl; cassette	Rolling Stones	
Australia	11 March 1991	7-inch vinyl; cassette	Rolling Stones	
Japan	21 March 1991	Mini-CD	Rolling Stones	
Australia	25 March 1991	CD	Rolling Stones	
United Kingdom	8 April 1991	12-inch vinyl	Rolling Stones	

== See also ==
- List of anti-war songs
- List of number-one mainstream rock hits (United States)
