= Songs from Liquid Days =

Studio album by Philip Glass
- Released: 1986
- Recorded: The Living Room, New York; The Complex, Los Angeles
- Length: 39:49
- Label: CBS
- Producer: Kurt Munkacsi

Philip Glass chronology
Satyagraha (1985)	Songs from Liquid Days (1986)	Dancepieces (1987)

Professional ratings
Review scores
Source	Rating
AllMusic	4.5/5 stars
Pitchfork	5.4/10

Songs from Liquid Days is a collection of songs composed by composer Philip Glass with lyrics by Paul Simon, Suzanne Vega, David Byrne, and Laurie Anderson. Glass began the project scoring lyrics by Byrne and then thought to collaborate with additional songwriters.

== Details ==
The album was conceived in 1983, but mostly written and recorded in 1985. Glass said, "I was curious. The question I asked myself was: 'If I, a person from the world of concert music and opera, wrote a song, what would it sound like?'"

On the project, Glass said:

The words come first. From these I fashioned a set of six songs which, together, form a cycle of themes ranging from reflections on nature to classic romantic settings. After the music was written, I — along with producer Kurt Munkacsi and conductor Michael Riesman — began the long and difficult process of 'casting' singers for the individual songs. We felt that the interpretation a singer brings to a song is an immense contribution to its character — contributing their own personality to the work perhaps more than any other performer.

The recording features performances by Bernard Fowler, the Kronos Quartet, Janice Pendarvis, Douglas Perry, the Roches, Linda Ronstadt, and the Philip Glass Ensemble, directed by Michael Riesman. The recording was released in 1986 by CBS Records. The song "Lightning" was performed by the Philip Glass Ensemble on Saturday Night Live, March 22, 1986.

The title comes from a lyric written by Byrne. Glass said, "It had a feeling of how the songs flowed into each other, as if each song were a day and the liquidity was the flow of the songs from one to the other. There’s no break between the songs. The end of one becomes the introduction to the next."

== Critical reception ==
Stephen Holden of The New York Times wrote in 1986,

The album's six songs are short, oracular reflections on time and love, with imagery that explicitly evokes mystical connections between people and objects ...

The cycle begins with Paul Simon's Changing Opinion, a mock-solemn meditation on the possible sources of an electrical hum in a room ...

Mr. Byrne's Open the Kingdom resolves the distance between the commonplace and the mystical in a Zen-like lyric whose abbreviated phrases imagine death as a rush into eternity in which sounds become words – a distant roar, turning to speak, turning to hear.

Holden concludes, "But with all its charms, Songs From Liquid Days is still minor Glass."

Freddy Stidean for AllMusic, wrote that "Songs From Liquid Days became Philip Glass' most popular and successful recording," and concluded that "Songs From Liquid Days may be their [the minimalist composers'] single greatest achievement."

== Track listing ==
1. Changing Opinion (Glass, Paul Simon; Bernard Fowler, vocals) – 9:57
2. Lightning (Glass, Suzanne Vega; Janice Pendarvis, vocals) – 6:42
3. Freezing (Glass, Suzanne Vega; The Kronos Quartet; Linda Ronstadt, vocals) – 3:16
4. Liquid Days (Glass, David Byrne; The Roches, vocals) – 4:45
5. Open the Kingdom (Liquid Days, Part Two) (Glass, David Byrne; Douglas Perry, vocals) – 6:59
6. Forgetting (Glass, Laurie Anderson; The Kronos Quartet; Linda Ronstadt, vocals; The Roches, backing vocals) – 8:10

All songs feature the Philip Glass Ensemble under direction of Michael Riesman.

== Artwork ==
Cover photo of Philip Glass is by Robert Mapplethorpe.

== Certifications ==
Region	Certification	Certified units/sales
Netherlands (NVPI)	Gold	15,000^{^}
^{^} Shipments figures based on certification alone.
