= It's Only Rock 'n Roll (But I Like It) =

1974 single by The Rolling Stones

- UK single cover

Single by the Rolling Stones

from the album It's Only Rock 'n Roll
- B-side: "Through the Lonely Nights"
- Released: 26 July 1974
- Recorded: 1973–74
- Genre: Hard rock
- Length: 5:07
- Label: Rolling Stones
- Songwriter: Jagger/Richards
- Producer: The Glimmer Twins

The Rolling Stones singles chronology
"Doo Doo Doo Doo Doo (Heartbreaker)" (1973)	"It's Only Rock 'n Roll (But I Like It)" (1974)	"Ain't Too Proud to Beg" (1974)

"It's Only Rock 'n Roll (But I Like It)" is the lead single by the English rock band the Rolling Stones from their twelfth studio album It's Only Rock 'n Roll (1974). Writing is credited to Mick Jagger and Keith Richards and the single reached the top ten in the UK charts and top 20 in the United States.

== Inspiration and recording ==
Recorded in late 1973 and completed in the spring of 1974, "It's Only Rock 'n Roll (But I Like It)" is credited to the Rolling Stones songwriting team Mick Jagger and Keith Richards, although future Rolling Stones guitarist Ronnie Wood collaborated with Jagger on it. The song was originally recorded one night in a studio at Wood's house, "The Wick" in Richmond, London. David Bowie was backing singer to Jagger's lead, and Willie Weeks played bass with Kenney Jones on drums. The song on the album is similar to that original recording, with the Stones keeping the original rhythm track.

The meaning of the lyrics was summed up by Jagger in the liner notes to the 1993 compilation Jump Back; "The idea of the song has to do with our public persona at the time. I was getting a bit tired of people having a go, all that, 'oh, it's not as good as their last one' business. The single sleeve had a picture of me with a pen digging into me as if it were a sword. It was a lighthearted, anti-journalistic sort of thing."

If I could stick my pen in my heart, And spill it all over the stage;
Would it satisfy ya, would it slide on by ya, Would you think the boy is strange? Ain't he strange?

If I could win ya, if I could sing ya, a love song so divine,
Would it be enough for your cheatin' heart, If I broke down and cried? If I cried?

I said I know it's only rock 'n roll but I like it

Jagger also has said that as soon as he wrote it, he knew it was going to be a single. He said it was his answer to everyone who took seriously what he or the band did. According to Richards there was opposition to it being a single but they persisted, saying it had to be the next single. He said that to him "that song is a classic. The title alone is a classic and that's the whole thing about it."

== Reception ==
Cash Box called it a "hard rocker with the traditional Stones power that displays a really great hook" with "driving instrumentation and Jagger's inimitable vocal style". Record World called it "an r&r anthem of the most footstompin' fantastic proportions." Reviewers of Billboard took this song as "a little put-on on the current glitter rock scene". They wrote: "Title repetition is instantly catching, and this may be the most powerful uptempo thing they’ve done since 'Brown Sugar' some three years ago."

== Music video ==
The song was promoted by a music video directed by Michael Lindsay-Hogg, showing the band dressed in sailor suits and playing in a tent which eventually fills with bubbles. This video was one of Mick Taylor's last appearances as a member of the band as he decided to leave in December 1974 (though he did not play on this song). Ronnie Wood, who does not appear in the video, played acoustic guitar on the recording, alongside Keith Richards on electric guitar.

The froth was detergent and, according to Richards, the idea for the sailor suits came about at the last minute because none of the members wanted to get their own wardrobe ruined. Jagger said the entire filming process was "most unpleasant" and was also extremely lengthy. The cameras and lights could not be inside the tent for fear of electrocution. Because of this risk, in order for the video to be filmed at all, the band had to be insured for quite a reasonable sum. Richards is quoted as saying: "Poor old Charlie [Watts] nearly drowned... because we forgot he was sitting down."

== Live performances ==
The song was initially played frequently throughout the mid-1970s before being dropped by 1978. However, the song would later return to the set in 1989 on the Steel Wheels/Urban Jungle Tour and has remained a staple on every subsequent tour.

Onstage, the song is typically played in a 1950s rock 'n roll style, with Keith Richards also employing a Chuck Berry-inspired guitar intro to the song.

== Personnel ==
According to authors Philippe Margotin and Jean-Michel Guesdon:

- Mick Jagger – vocals
- Keith Richards – electric guitar, backing vocals
- Ronnie Wood – twelve-string acoustic guitar, backing vocals
- Willie Weeks – bass
- Kenney Jones – drums
- David Bowie – backing vocals
- Ian Stewart – piano

== Charts ==
Chart (1974)	Peak position
Australia (Kent Music Report)	17
Canada Top Singles (RPM)	13
Germany (GfK)	36
Ireland (IRMA)	6
Netherlands (Single Top 100)	13
Norway (VG-lista)	8
UK Singles (Official Charts)	10
US Billboard Hot 100	16

== Release ==
Released in July 1974, "It's Only Rock 'n Roll (But I Like It)" reached number sixteen in the United States and number ten on the UK Singles Chart. The B-side was the ballad "Through the Lonely Nights", which was not featured on any album until the 2005 compilation Rarities 1971-2003.

The Rolling Stones regularly perform the song in concert, although in a different key from the studio recording: on their concert albums Love You Live (1977) and Live Licks (2004), the song is in B, whereas the studio track is in E. According to Richards, the song was recorded in the wrong key, but they did not realise this until they played it live.

== Cover versions and references ==
- David Bowie sometimes sang the song's title during performances of his song "Diamond Dogs" during his Diamond Dogs Tour (1974) and Isolar Tour (1976).
- "Weird Al" Yankovic also did a polka cover of the song as the first and longest of his "Hot Rocks Polka", which consists entirely of The Stones' songs. It was used in the soundtrack for his movie UHF.
- Tina Turner performed the song as a duet with Mick Jagger during the Live Aid concert in 1985. Turner also included the song (as well as "Jumpin' Jack Flash") on her 1982 tour and her 2008–2009 50th Anniversary Tour, where she was joined by Lisa Fischer.
- At the Rock and Roll Hall of Fame 25th Anniversary Concert, U2 singer Bono ended the performance of "Vertigo" with the chorus of "It's Only Rock 'n Roll". Later in the same concert U2 and Mick Jagger performed "Gimme Shelter" and "Stuck in a Moment".
- Brothers Osborne and the War and Treaty teamed up to cover the song for the 2023 Stones tribute album Stoned Cold Country and performed the song live at the 56th Annual Country Music Association Awards.

The chorus was parodied as "it's only knock and knowall, but I like it" in "it.", the final song on Genesis' album The Lamb Lies Down on Broadway, released in late 1974.

== Artists for Children's Promise version ==
"It's Only Rock 'n Roll (But I Like It)"

Single by Artists for Children's Promise
- Released: 9 December 1999
- Recorded: 1999
- Genre: Rock
- Length: 5:03
- Label: Universal Music Group
- Songwriter: Jagger/Richards
- Producer: Arthur Baker

In 1999, a cover of "It's Only Rock 'n Roll (But I Like It)" was record by the supergroup Artists for Children's Promise, featuring an international ensemble of artists. The single was released to raise money for Children's Promise. It was released on 9 December 1999 and peaked at number 19 in United Kingdom.

=== Artists for Children's Promise ===
- Keith Richards
- Spice Girls
- Jon Bon Jovi
- Kid Rock
- Mary J. Blige
- Kelly Jones of Stereophonics
- Kéllé Bryan
- Jay Kay of Jamiroquai
- Ozzy Osbourne
- Womack & Womack
- Lionel Richie
- Bonnie Raitt
- Dolores O’Riordan of The Cranberries
- James Brown
- Mick Jagger
- Robin Williams
- Jackson Browne
- Iggy Pop
- Chrissie Hynde
- Skin of Skunk Anansie
- Annie Lennox
- Mark Owen
- Natalie Imbruglia
- Fun Lovin' Criminals
- Dina Carroll
- Gavin Rossdale of Bush
- B. B. King
- Joe Cocker
- The Corrs
- Steve Cradock & Simon Fowler of Ocean Colour Scene
- Ronan Keating
- Ray Barretto
- Herbie Hancock
- Francis Rossi & Rick Parfitt of Status Quo
- S Club 7
- Eric Idle

=== Charts ===
Weekly chart performance for "It's Only Rock 'n Roll (But I Like It)"
Chart (1999)	Peak position
Italy (FIMI)	19
Italy (Musica e Dischi)	10
Netherlands (Dutch Tipparade 40)	6
Netherlands (Single Top 100)	55
Switzerland (Schweizer Hitparade)	92
United Kingdom (OCC)	19
