= Steel Wheels =

Studio album by the Rolling Stones
- Released: 29 August 1989
- Recorded: 29 March – 5 May 1989
- Studios: AIR, Montserrat; The Hit Factory (New York City); Mixed at Olympic, London; The Palace of Ben Abbou (Tangier, Morocco)
- Genres: Rock; hard rock
- Length: 53:03
- Labels: Rolling Stones; Columbia
- Producers: Chris Kimsey, The Glimmer Twins

The Rolling Stones chronology
Dirty Work (1986)	Steel Wheels (1989)	Flashpoint (1991)

The Rolling Stones studio album chronology
Dirty Work (1986)	Steel Wheels (1989)	Voodoo Lounge (1994)

Singles from Steel Wheels
- 1. "Mixed Emotions" Released: August 1989; 2. "Rock and a Hard Place" Released: October 1989; 3. "Almost Hear You Sigh" Released: January 1990 (US); 4. "Terrifying" Released: July 1990 (UK)

Steel Wheels is the nineteenth UK and twenty-first US studio album by the English rock band the Rolling Stones, released on 29 August 1989 in the US and on 11 September in the UK. It was the final album of new material that the band recorded for Columbia Records.

Hailed as a major comeback upon its release, Steel Wheels is notable for the patching up of the working relationship between Mick Jagger and Keith Richards, a reversion to a more classic style of music and the launching of the band's biggest world tour to date. It is also the final full-length studio album to involve long-time bassist Bill Wyman, preceding the announcement of his departure in January 1993. Wyman's final tenure with the band would be on two studio tracks for the 1991 album Flashpoint. Steel Wheels was also the first album since Some Girls not to feature former member and frequent contributor Ian Stewart, who died shortly before the release of their previous album Dirty Work. It was produced by Richards and Jagger, along with Chris Kimsey, who had previously produced the Stones' 1983 Undercover.

After the relative disappointment of their prior two albums, Steel Wheels was a hit, reaching multi-platinum status in the United States, Top 5 status in numerous markets around the world, and spawning two hit singles: "Mixed Emotions", which peaked at No. 1 in Canada and No. 5 in the United States, and "Rock and a Hard Place", the band's last Top-40 hit in the US. Critics were generally lukewarm towards the album, exemplified by Stephen Thomas Erlewine's retrospective assessment: "It doesn't make for a great Stones album, but it's not bad, and it feels like a comeback."

== Background ==
Following the release of 1986's Dirty Work, and Jagger's pursuit of a solo career, relations between him and the Stones-committed Richards worsened considerably. While Jagger released the tepidly received Primitive Cool in 1987, Richards recorded Talk Is Cheap, his solo debut, released in 1988 to positive reviews. The two years apart appeared to have healed the wounds sufficiently to begin resurrecting their partnership and band. Ronnie Wood said of Steel Wheels: "It’s the album that united the band again, after a three year hiatus that was almost permanent".

Meeting in January 1989, just preceding the Stones' induction into the Rock and Roll Hall of Fame, with the chemistry between Jagger and Richards reasserting itself, "their differences were ultimately overcome by the power of their long partnership". After composing some 50 songs in a matter of weeks, Ronnie Wood, Wyman and Charlie Watts were called in to begin recording what would become Steel Wheels, beckoning Undercover co-producer Chris Kimsey to perform the same role.

Recording in Montserrat and London during the spring, Steel Wheels was designed to emulate a classic Rolling Stones sound. One notable exception was "Continental Drift", an Eastern-flavoured piece, with The Master Musicians of Jajouka led by Bachir Attar, recorded in June 1989 in Tangier, coordinated by Cherie Nutting. With much of the past disagreements behind them, sessions for Steel Wheels were fairly harmonious.

== Release and reception ==
Professional ratings
Review scores
Source	Rating
AllMusic	3/5 stars
Christgau's Record Guide	B−
The Great Rock Discography	6/10
MusicHound	2.5/5 stars
Q	4/5 stars
Record Collector	3/5 stars
Rolling Stone	4.5/5 stars
The Rolling Stone Album Guide	3/5 stars
Tom Hull	B−
The Encyclopedia of Popular Music	3/5 stars

The massive, worldwide Steel Wheels Tour was launched in late August 1989, concurrently with Steel Wheels' arrival and the release of lead single "Mixed Emotions", a partially biographical reference to Jagger and Richards' recent woes that proved to be the Rolling Stones' last major hit single in the United States, reaching No. 5. Critical reaction was warm, with Steel Wheels reaching No. 2 in the UK and No. 3 in the US where it went double-platinum. Follow-up singles were "Rock and a Hard Place", "Almost Hear You Sigh" and "Terrifying".

The Steel Wheels Tour, which finished in mid-1990 after being re-titled the Urban Jungle Tour, was a financial success. In 1990, FOX aired a 3-D television special of the Steel Wheels tour. Unlike anaglyphic 3-D which requires the familiar red and green glasses, the method used was the Pulfrich Effect which permitted full-colour video. The film was shot by Gerald Marks of PullTime 3-D in NYC. An IMAX film of the tour was released the next year, which still plays sporadically at IMAX venues around the world.

Anthony DeCurtis of Rolling Stone writes "All the ambivalence, recriminations, attempted rapprochement and psychological one-upmanship evident on Steel Wheels testify that the Stones are right in the element that has historically spawned their best music – a murky, dangerously charged environment in which nothing is merely what it seems. Against all odds, and at this late date, the Stones have once again generated an album that will have the world dancing to deeply troubling, unresolved emotions."

Stephen Thomas Erlewine of AllMusic writes "The Stones sound good, and Mick and Keith both get off a killer ballad apiece with "Almost Hear You Sigh" and "Slipping Away", respectively. It doesn't make for a great Stones album, but it's not bad, and it feels like a comeback – which it was supposed to, after all."

In 2000 it was voted number 568 in Colin Larkin's All Time Top 1000 Albums.

The album was the Rolling Stones' first digital recording. In 1994, Steel Wheels was remastered and reissued by Virgin Records, and again in 2009 by Universal Music. An SHM-CD version was released on 2 December 2015 by Universal Japan, mastered from the original British master tape.

== Track listing ==
All tracks are written by Mick Jagger and Keith Richards, except "Almost Hear You Sigh" co-written by Steve Jordan.

Side one
No.	Title	Length
1.	"Sad Sad Sad"	3:35
2.	"Mixed Emotions"	4:38
3.	"Terrifying"	4:53
4.	"Hold on to Your Hat"	3:32
5.	"Hearts for Sale"	4:40
6.	"Blinded by Love"	4:37
Total length:		25:55

Side two
No.	Title	Length
7.	"Rock and a Hard Place"	5:25
8.	"Can't Be Seen"	4:09
9.	"Almost Hear You Sigh"	4:37
10.	"Continental Drift"	5:14
11.	"Break the Spell"	3:06
12.	"Slipping Away"	4:29
Total length:		27:00

== Personnel ==
Adapted from Steel Wheels liner notes.

The Rolling Stones

- Mick Jagger – lead vocals (except 8 & 12), backing vocals (1, 2, 9, 12), guitar (1, 2, 4–7, 11), harmonica (5, 11), shakers (2, 3), keyboards (10)
- Keith Richards – guitar (except 10), backing vocals (2, 3, 6, 8, 9, 12), acoustic guitar (10), classical guitar (9), lead vocals (8 & 12), bicycle spokes (10)
- Ronnie Wood – guitar (2, 3, 5–9, 12), bass guitar (1, 4, 11), acoustic bass (10), Dobro (11), backing vocals (9)
- Bill Wyman – bass guitar (2, 3, 5–9, 12)
- Charlie Watts – drums (all tracks)

Additional musicians

- Chuck Leavell – organ (1–3, 6, 8, 12), piano (1, 2, 12), keyboards (7, 9), Wurlitzer (8)
- Matt Clifford – electric piano (12), piano (6), keyboards (3, 5, 7, 9, 11), clavinet (8), harmonium (6), percussion programming (10), orchestration (10), strings (12)
- Sarah Dash – backing vocals (2, 7, 9, 10, 12)
- Lisa Fischer – backing vocals (2, 3, 7, 9, 10, 12)
- Bernard Fowler – backing vocals (1, 2, 5–10, 12)
- Luís Jardim – percussion (2, 6, 8, 9)
- Phil Beer – mandolin (6), fiddle (6)
- The Kick Horns – brass (1, 2, 7, 12)
- Roddy Lorimer – trumpet (3)
- The Master Musicians of Jajouka led by Bachir Attar Farafina – African-Moroccan instruments (10)
- Sonia Morgan – backing vocals (10)
- Tessa Niles – backing vocals (10)
- Chris Jagger – literary editor (6, 9)

Technical and design

- Recording engineer – Christopher Marc Potter
- Assistant engineer – Rupert Coulson
- Recorded at AIR Studios, Montserrat
- Mixed by Michael Brauer, Christopher Marc Potter, Chris Kimsey
- Art direction and design – John Warwicker
- Logo design – Mark Morton
- Mastering – Ted Jensen at Sterling Sound, NYC

== Charts ==
=== Weekly charts ===
Weekly chart performance for Steel Wheels
Chart (1989–1990)	Peak position
Australian Albums (ARIA)	7
Austrian Albums (Ö3 Austria)	1
Canada Top Albums/CDs (RPM)	1
Dutch Albums (Album Top 100)	2
Finland (The Official Finnish Charts)	1
French Albums (SNEP)	6
German Albums (Offizielle Top 100)	2
Italian Albums (Musica e Dischi)	5
Japanese Albums (Oricon)	5
New Zealand Albums (RMNZ)	3
Norwegian Albums (VG-lista)	1
Spanish Albums (PROMUSICAE)	6
Swedish Albums (Sverigetopplistan)	2
Swiss Albums (Schweizer Hitparade)	2
UK Albums (Official Charts)	2
US Billboard 200	3

=== Year-end charts ===
1989 year-end chart performance for Steel Wheels
Chart (1989)	Position
Canada Top Albums/CDs (RPM)	13
Dutch Albums (Album Top 100)	37
French Albums (SNEP)	36
Japanese Albums Chart	89

1990 year-end chart performance for Steel Wheels
Chart (1990)	Position
Canada Top Albums/CDs (RPM)	13
Dutch Albums (Album Top 100)	66
US Billboard 200	50

== Certifications and sales ==
Certifications and sales for Steel Wheels
Region	Certification	Certified units/sales
Australia (ARIA)	Platinum	75,000
Austria (IFPI Austria)	Gold	25,000^{*}
Canada (Music Canada)	3× Platinum	300,000^{^}
Finland (Musiikkituottajat)	Gold	25,227
France (SNEP)	2× Gold	200,000^{*}
Germany (BVMI)	Gold	250,000^{^}
Italy (FIMI)	Gold	100,000
Japan (RIAJ)	Gold	167,000
Netherlands (NVPI)	Gold	50,000^{^}
Spain (Promusicae)	Platinum	100,000^{^}
Sweden (GLF)	Gold	50,000^{^}
Switzerland (IFPI Switzerland)	Gold	25,000^{^}
United Kingdom (BPI)	Gold	100,000^{^}
United States (RIAA)	2× Platinum	2,000,000^{^}
^{*} Sales figures based on certification alone.^{^} Shipments figures based on certification alone.
