= Michael Cohl =

- Origin: Canada
- Occupations: Concert promoter, theatrical producer, touring impresario

Michael Cohl is a Canadian concert promoter, theatrical producer and touring impresario. He is the former chairman of Live Nation. Cohl now runs S2BN Entertainment, with offices in New York and Toronto. Having been named the Howard Hughes of rock ‘n’ roll by Fortune magazine, Cohl is most famous for having overseen the tours and related ancillary businesses for more than 150 artists, including Frank Sinatra, Michael Jackson, The Rolling Stones, Prince, Stevie Wonder, Pink Floyd, Crosby, Stills, Nash and Young, The Tragically Hip and U2. He has also been credited with developing the concept of "package" touring. Eliminating the middleman, Cohl worked directly with the artist to strategize and route the tour, promote the dates, and assist in the development and exploitation of the lucrative aftermarket – books, films, DVDs, television specials, and merchandising. He was the lead producer of Spider-Man: Turn Off the Dark, the most expensive musical flop in Broadway history, with music by Bono and The Edge of U2.

In December 1995, The Toronto Star printed a 4,000 word article entitled "King Cohl of Rock'n'Roll and the Tax That Never Was." From conversations with a number of managers of touring bands, the reporter argued that Cohl's Concert Productions International misrepresented to touring artists that it was collecting a tax, while not remitting any such tax to any government body. The tax was a phoney tax Cohl added onto every ticket he sold at Toronto's CNE Stadium. Fans paid an extra $3 per ticket for Springsteen, U2, and Stones tickets. According to Canadian government auditors, that $3 per ticket added up to $5 million, all of which was pocketed by Cohl. He avoided jail time but had to sell back his BCL Entertainment Ltd stock to Labatt's.

== Honours ==
Cohl was inducted into the Canadian Music Hall of Fame, when he received a Walt Grealis Special Achievement Award at the 2002 Juno Awards. Cohl is also a recipient of the 2004 Billboard Legend of Live award, an honour previously bestowed on such artists as Elton John and The Allman Brothers Band. When Spamalot won the 2005 Drama Desk and Tony Award for Best Musical, Cohl was among the producers who received the awards. He was inducted in Canada's Walk of Fame in 2005

== Theatre ==
Cohl has produced several Broadway musicals as well as numerous other international touring shows. These include:

- Spider-Man: Turn Off the Dark
- The Lord of the Rings
- Hairspray
- The Producers
- November
- Spamalot
- La Cage aux Folles
- Bombay Dreams

== Satisfaction: The Life and Times of Michael Cohl ==
CBC Television released a 2006 documentary directed by acclaimed filmmaker Barry Avrich as part of the Life and Times series chronicling Cohl's rise to prominence in the entertainment industry. The film claims "When the Rolling Stones won’t make a move without talking to you first, your name must be Michael Cohl." Mick Jagger, Keith Richards and Bono all make appearances.
