= Steel Wheels/Urban Jungle Tour =

1989–90 concert tour by the Rolling Stones

Steel Wheels Tour/Urban Jungle Tour
- Tour by The Rolling Stones
- Location: Asia; Europe; North America
- Associated album: Steel Wheels
- Start date: 31 August 1989
- End date: 25 August 1990
- Legs: 3
- No. of shows: 115
- Box office: US$175 million (US$431,259,552 in 2025 dollars)

The Rolling Stones concert chronology
- European Tour 1982 (1982); Steel Wheels/Urban Jungle Tour (1989–90); Voodoo Lounge Tour (1994–95)

The Rolling Stones' Steel Wheels Tour was a concert tour which was launched in North America in August 1989 to promote the band's album Steel Wheels; it continued to Japan in February 1990, with ten shows at the Tokyo Dome. The European leg of the tour, which featured a different stage and logo, was called the Urban Jungle Tour; it ran from May to August 1990. These would be the last live concerts for the band with original member Bill Wyman on bass guitar. This tour would also be the longest the band had ever done up to that point, playing over twice as many shows as their standard tour length from the 1960s and 1970s.

The tour was a financial success, cementing the Rolling Stones' return to full commercial power after a seven-year hiatus in touring marked by well publicized acrimony among band members.

== History ==
The Rolling Stones began pre-tour preparations in July 1989 at the Wykeham Rise School, a former boarding school for girls in Litchfield, Connecticut. A 25-member entourage was hired to support the band.

The group performed a pre-tour 'surprise show' that took place on 12 August 1989 at Toad's Place in New Haven, Connecticut, with a local act, Sons of Bob, opening the show for an audience of only 700 people who had purchased tickets for $3.01 apiece. Toad's owner, Mike Spoerndle, had promoted the event as a private birthday party for Jim Koplik, the club's promoter. The official Steel Wheels Tour kicked off later that month at the now-demolished Veterans Stadium in Philadelphia. During the opening show in Philadelphia, the power went out during "Shattered", and caused a slight delay in the show. Jagger came out and spoke to the crowd during the delay. The Stones returned to Vancouver, B.C. in Canada and played two sold-out concerts at B.C. Place Stadium. Fan reaction for tickets was unprecedented. One local radio station, 99.3 The Fox, even had a man (Andrew Korn) sit in front of the station in a bath tub filled with brown sugar and water for free tickets to the concert.

The stage was designed by Mark Fisher with the participation of Charlie Watts and Mick Jagger. Lighting design was by Patrick Woodroffe.

Canadian promoter Michael Cohl made his name buying the concert, sponsorship, merchandising, radio, television, and film rights to the Steel Wheels Tour. It became the most financially successful rock tour in history up to that time. Rival promoter Bill Graham, who also bid on the tour, later wrote that "Losing the Stones was like watching my favourite lover become a whore."

Performances from the tour were documented on the album Flashpoint, and the video Live at the Max, both released in 1991.

Opening acts for the tour included Living Colour, Dan Reed Network, Guns N' Roses and Gun.

The original two dates at Wembley Stadium that originally were set to take place on 13 and 14 July 1990 had to be rescheduled for 24 and 25 August 1990 due to Keith Richards cutting a finger the previous week.

In August 1990, an extra concert in Prague, Czechoslovakia, was added. Czechoslovakia had overthrown the Communist regime nine months earlier, and the Rolling Stones' concert was perceived as a symbolic end of the revolution. Czechoslovakia's new president Václav Havel, a lifelong fan of the band, helped to arrange the event, and met the band at the Prague Castle before the show. Performance expenses were partially covered by Havel and by the Czechoslovak Ministry of Industry. The attendance was over 100,000. The band chose to donate all revenues from the gig (over 4 million Czechoslovak korunas) to the Committee of Good Will, a charity run by Havel's wife Olga Havlová.

== Recordings ==
Released in 1991, Flashpoint is a 17-song live album of material recorded during the Steel Wheels/Urban Jungle Tour.

In July 2020, Eagle Rock Entertainment released a recording and DVD set of the final date of the North American tour titled Steel Wheels Live. The performance, recorded at the Atlantic City Convention Center, features guest appearances by John Lee Hooker, Eric Clapton, Axl Rose and Izzy Stradlin.

== Personnel ==
=== The Rolling Stones ===
- Mick Jagger – lead vocals, guitar, harmonica, percussion
- Keith Richards – rhythm guitars, lead guitars, vocals
- Ronnie Wood – lead guitars
- Bill Wyman – bass guitar
- Charlie Watts – drums

=== Additional musicians ===
- Matt Clifford – keyboards, backing vocals, percussion, French horn
- Bobby Keys – saxophone
- Chuck Leavell – keyboards, backing vocals and musical director
- Bernard Fowler – backing vocals, percussion
- Lisa Fischer – backing vocals on the North American & Japanese tours only
- W. "Bindy" Bindeman – backing vocals, keyboards- Japanese tours only
- Cindy Mizelle – backing vocals on the North American & Japanese tours only
- Pamela Quinlan – backing vocals on North American & European tour only
- Lorelei McBroom – backing vocals on the European tour only
- Sophia Jones – backing vocals on the European tour only
- The Uptown Horns:
1. Arno Hecht – saxophone
2. Bob Funk – trombone
3. Crispin Cioe – saxophone
4. Paul Litteral – trumpet

=== Entourage ===
- Michael Cohl – Tour Director
- Norman Perry – Assistant Tour Director
- Alan Dunn – Logistics
- Arnold Dunn – Band Road Manager
- Timm Wooley – Financial Controller
- Bob Hurwitz – Tour Accountant
- Stan Damas – Police Liaison
- Jim Callaghan – Security Chief
- Rowan Brade – Security
- Bob Bender – Security
- Joe Seabrook – Security
- William Horgan – Security
- Linn Tanzmann – Band Press Representative
- Neil Friedman – Assistant Tour Publicist
- Bennett Kleinberg – Advance Tour Publicist
- Dimo Safari – Tour Photographer
- Beth Kittrell – Administrative Assistant
- Caroline Clements – Makeup
- Robern Pickering – Wardrobe
- Fiona Williams – Stylist
- LaVelle Smith – Choreographer
- Torje Eike – Physiotherapist
- Joseph Sakowicz – Band/Entourage Luggage
- Shelley Lazar – Ticket/Credentials Coordinator
- Miranda Guinness – Asst. to Mick Jagger
- Tony Russell – Asst. to Keith Richards
- Jo Howard – Asst. to Ron Wood
- Tony King – Mick Jagger Press Liaison
- Patricia Aleck – Travel Advance
- Cliff Burnstein – Creative Consultant
- Peter Mensch – Creative Consultant

=== Production ===
- Michael Ahern – Production Manager
- Chuch Magee – Backline Crew Chief
- Roy Lamb – Stage Manager
- Mark Fisher – Set Designer
- Patrick Woodroffe – Lighting Designer
- Benji Lefevre – FOH Sound Engineer
- Chris Wade-Evans – Monitor Sound Engineer
- Gary Epstein - Universal System Engineer
- Pierre De Beauport – Guitar Technician
- Andy Topeka – Keyboard Technician
- Steve Thomas – Production Advance
- Steve Howard – Promoter Production Rep
- Bruce Haynes – Electrician
- Shane Hendrick – Electrician
- David Sinclair – Electrician
- Henry Wetzel – Electrician

== Tour dates ==
List of 1989 concerts
Date	City	Country	Venue	Tickets sold / available	Revenue	Opening act(s)
12 August 1989 (Note: Intimate small club show. This show would spark an ongoing Rolling Stones tradition of playing a small club show before the larger tour venues.)	New Haven	United States	Toad's Place (Note: 700 capacity venue.)	700 / 700	$2,107	Sons of Bob
31 August 1989	Philadelphia	United States	Veterans Stadium	110,556 / 110,556	$3,181,143	Living Colour
1 September 1989	Philadelphia	United States	Veterans Stadium	110,556 / 110,556	$3,181,143	Living Colour
3 September 1989	Toronto	Canada	CNE Stadium	121,897 / 121,897	$3,368,752	Living Colour
4 September 1989	Toronto	Canada	CNE Stadium	121,897 / 121,897	$3,368,752	Living Colour
6 September 1989	Pittsburgh	United States	Three Rivers Stadium	62,939 / 62,939	$1,790,526	Living Colour
8 September 1989	East Troy	United States	Alpine Valley	105,995 / 105,995	$2,941,882	Living Colour
9 September 1989	East Troy	United States	Alpine Valley	105,995 / 105,995	$2,941,882	Living Colour
11 September 1989	East Troy	United States	Alpine Valley	105,995 / 105,995	$2,941,882	Living Colour
14 September 1989	Cincinnati	United States	Riverfront Stadium	53,555 / 53,555	$1,522,536	Living Colour
16 September 1989	Raleigh	United States	Carter–Finley Stadium	52,881 / 52,881	$1,506,393	Living Colour
17 September 1989	St. Louis	United States	Busch Stadium	53,705 / 53,705	$1,528,397	Living Colour
19 September 1989	Louisville	United States	Cardinal Stadium	39,301 / 39,301	$1,120,075	Living Colour
21 September 1989	Syracuse	United States	Carrier Dome	73,828 / 73,828	$2,082,325	Living Colour
22 September 1989	Syracuse	United States	Carrier Dome	73,828 / 73,828	$2,082,325	Living Colour
24 September 1989	Washington, D.C.	United States	Robert F. Kennedy Stadium	105,267 / 105,267	$2,988,142	Living Colour
25 September 1989	Washington, D.C.	United States	Robert F. Kennedy Stadium	105,267 / 105,267	$2,988,142	Living Colour
27 September 1989	Cleveland	United States	Municipal Stadium	61,527 / 61,527	$1,753,520	Living Colour
29 September 1989	Foxborough	United States	Sullivan Stadium	163,308 / 163,308	$4,648,338	Living Colour
1 October 1989	Foxborough	United States	Sullivan Stadium	163,308 / 163,308	$4,648,338	Living Colour
3 October 1989	Foxborough	United States	Sullivan Stadium	163,308 / 163,308	$4,648,338	Living Colour
5 October 1989	Birmingham	United States	Legion Field	63,523 / 63,523	$1,804,348	Living Colour
7 October 1989	Ames	United States	Cyclone Field	55,857 / 55,857	$1,589,273	Living Colour
8 October 1989	Kansas City	United States	Arrowhead Stadium	55,306 / 55,306	$1,576,075	Living Colour
10 October 1989	New York City	United States	Shea Stadium	124,524 / 124,524	$3,735,610	Living Colour
11 October 1989	New York City	United States	Shea Stadium	124,524 / 124,524	$3,735,610	Living Colour
18 October 1989	Los Angeles	United States	Los Angeles Memorial Coliseum	360,069 / 360,069	$9,166,937	Guns N' Roses; Living Colour
19 October 1989	Los Angeles	United States	Los Angeles Memorial Coliseum	360,069 / 360,069	$9,166,937	Guns N' Roses; Living Colour
21 October 1989	Los Angeles	United States	Los Angeles Memorial Coliseum	360,069 / 360,069	$9,166,937	Guns N' Roses; Living Colour
22 October 1989	Los Angeles	United States	Los Angeles Memorial Coliseum	360,069 / 360,069	$9,166,937	Guns N' Roses; Living Colour
25 October 1989	New York City	United States	Shea Stadium	263,213 / 263,213	$7,871,842	Living Colour
26 October 1989	New York City	United States	Shea Stadium	263,213 / 263,213	$7,871,842	Living Colour
28 October 1989	New York City	United States	Shea Stadium	263,213 / 263,213	$7,871,842	Living Colour
29 October 1989	New York City	United States	Shea Stadium	263,213 / 263,213	$7,871,842	Living Colour
1 November 1989	Vancouver	Canada	BC Place Stadium	110,591 / 110,591	$3,065,058	Living Colour
2 November 1989	Vancouver	Canada	BC Place Stadium	110,591 / 110,591	$3,065,058	Living Colour
4 November 1989	Oakland	United States	Oakland–Alameda County Coliseum	117,603 / 117,603	$3,347,518	Living Colour
5 November 1989	Oakland	United States	Oakland–Alameda County Coliseum	117,603 / 117,603	$3,347,518	Living Colour
8 November 1989	Houston	United States	Astrodome	52,278 / 52,278	$1,486,623	Living Colour
10 November 1989	Dallas	United States	Cotton Bowl	119,856 / 119,856	$3,410,856	Living Colour
11 November 1989	Dallas	United States	Cotton Bowl	119,856 / 119,856	$3,410,856	Living Colour
13 November 1989	New Orleans	United States	Louisiana Superdome	59,339 / 59,339	$1,682,220	Living Colour
15 November 1989	Miami	United States	Orange Bowl	107,175 / 110,000	$3,054,488	Living Colour
16 November 1989	Miami	United States	Orange Bowl	107,175 / 110,000	$3,054,488	Living Colour
18 November 1989	Tampa	United States	Tampa Stadium	63,415 / 63,415	$1,802,884	Living Colour
21 November 1989	Atlanta	United States	Grant Field	49,311 / 49,311	$1,401,082	Living Colour
25 November 1989	Jacksonville	United States	Gator Bowl	62,637 / 62,637	$1,779,205	Living Colour
26 November 1989	Clemson	United States	Memorial Stadium	63,784 / 63,784	$1,817,844	Living Colour
29 November 1989	Minneapolis	United States	Hubert H. Humphrey Metrodome	104,780 / 104,780	$2,976,592	Living Colour
30 November 1989	Minneapolis	United States	Hubert H. Humphrey Metrodome	104,780 / 104,780	$2,976,592	Living Colour
3 December 1989	Toronto	Canada	SkyDome	117,446 / 117,446	$3,282,757	Living Colour
4 December 1989	Toronto	Canada	SkyDome	117,446 / 117,446	$3,282,757	Living Colour
6 December 1989	Indianapolis	United States	Hoosier Dome	89,078 / 89,078	$2,533,955	Living Colour
7 December 1989	Indianapolis	United States	Hoosier Dome	89,078 / 89,078	$2,533,955	Living Colour
9 December 1989	Pontiac	United States	Silverdome	100,234 / 100,234	$2,956,834	Living Colour
10 December 1989	Pontiac	United States	Silverdome	100,234 / 100,234	$2,956,834	Living Colour
13 December 1989	Montreal	Canada	Olympic Stadium	123,962 / 123,962	$3,490,126	Living Colour
14 December 1989	Montreal	Canada	Olympic Stadium	123,962 / 123,962	$3,490,126	Living Colour
17 December 1989	Atlantic City	United States	Convention Center	—	—	—
19 December 1989	Atlantic City	United States	Convention Center	—	—	—
20 December 1989	Atlantic City	United States	Convention Center	—	—	—

List of 1990 concerts
Date	City	Country	Venue	Tickets sold / available	Revenue	Opening act(s)
14 February 1990	Tokyo	Japan	Tokyo Dome	—	—	—
16 February 1990	Tokyo	Japan	Tokyo Dome	—	—	—
17 February 1990	Tokyo	Japan	Tokyo Dome	—	—	—
19 February 1990	Tokyo	Japan	Tokyo Dome	—	—	—
20 February 1990	Tokyo	Japan	Tokyo Dome	—	—	—
21 February 1990	Tokyo	Japan	Tokyo Dome	—	—	—
23 February 1990	Tokyo	Japan	Tokyo Dome	—	—	—
24 February 1990	Tokyo	Japan	Tokyo Dome	—	—	—
26 February 1990	Tokyo	Japan	Tokyo Dome	—	—	—
27 February 1990	Tokyo	Japan	Tokyo Dome	—	—	—
18 May 1990	Rotterdam	Netherlands	De Kuip	—	—	Gun
19 May 1990	Rotterdam	Netherlands	De Kuip	—	—	Gun
21 May 1990	Rotterdam	Netherlands	De Kuip	—	—	Gun
23 May 1990	Hanover	West Germany	Niedersachsenstadion	—	—	Gun
24 May 1990	Hanover	West Germany	Niedersachsenstadion	—	—	Gun
26 May 1990	Frankfurt	West Germany	Waldstadion	—	—	Gun
27 May 1990	Frankfurt	West Germany	Waldstadion	—	—	Gun
30 May 1990	Cologne	West Germany	Müngersdorfer Stadion	—	—	Die Toten Hosen
31 May 1990	Cologne	West Germany	Müngersdorfer Stadion	—	—	Die Toten Hosen
2 June 1990	Munich	West Germany	Olympiastadion	—	—	Gun
3 June 1990	Munich	West Germany	Olympiastadion	—	—	Gun
6 June 1990	West Berlin	West Germany	Olympiastadion	—	—	Gun
10 June 1990	Lisbon	Portugal	Estádio José Alvalade	—	—	Gun
13 June 1990	Barcelona	Spain	Estadi Olímpic de Montjuïc	—	—	Gun
14 June 1990	Barcelona	Spain	Estadi Olímpic de Montjuïc	—	—	Gun
16 June 1990	Madrid	Spain	Estadio Vicente Calderón	—	—	Gun
17 June 1990	Madrid	Spain	Estadio Vicente Calderón	—	—	Gun
20 June 1990	Marseille	France	Stade Vélodrome	—	—	Gun
22 June 1990	Paris	France	Parc des Princes	—	—	Gun
23 June 1990	Paris	France	Parc des Princes	—	—	Gun
25 June 1990	Paris	France	Parc des Princes	—	—	Gun
27 June 1990	Basel	Switzerland	St. Jakob Stadium	—	—	Gun
4 July 1990	London	England	Wembley Stadium	—	—	Gun
6 July 1990	London	England	Wembley Stadium	—	—	Gun
7 July 1990	London	England	Wembley Stadium	—	—	Gun
9 July 1990	Glasgow	Scotland	Hampden Park	—	—	Gun
16 July 1990	Cardiff	Wales	Cardiff Arms Park	—	—	Dan Reed Network
18 July 1990	Newcastle	England	St James' Park	—	—	Dan Reed Network
20 July 1990	Manchester	England	Maine Road	—	—	Dan Reed Network
21 July 1990	Manchester	England	Maine Road	—	—	Dan Reed Network
25 July 1990	Rome	Italy	Stadio Flaminio	—	—	Dan Reed Network
26 July 1990	Rome	Italy	Stadio Flaminio	—	—	Dan Reed Network
28 July 1990	Turin	Italy	Stadio delle Alpi	—	—	Dan Reed Network
31 July 1990	Vienna	Austria	Praterstadion	—	—	Dan Reed Network
3 August 1990	Gothenburg	Sweden	Eriksberg	—	—	Dan Reed Network
4 August 1990	Gothenburg	Sweden	Eriksberg	—	—	Dan Reed Network
6 August 1990	Oslo	Norway	Valle Hovin	—	—	Dan Reed Network
7 August 1990	Oslo	Norway	Valle Hovin	—	—	Dan Reed Network
9 August 1990	Copenhagen	Denmark	Københavns Idrætspark	—	—	Dan Reed Network
13 August 1990	East Berlin	East Germany	Radrennbahn Weissensee	—	—	Living Colour
14 August 1990	East Berlin	East Germany	Radrennbahn Weissensee	—	—	Living Colour
16 August 1990	Gelsenkirchen	West Germany	Parkstadion	—	—	—N/a
18 August 1990	Prague	Czechoslovakia	Strahov Stadium	—	—	Dan Reed Network; Vladimír Mišík; Etc...
24 August 1990	London	England	Wembley Stadium	—	—	—
25 August 1990	London	England	Wembley Stadium	—	—	—

== See also ==
- List of highest grossing concert tours
- List of most-attended concert tours
- List of most-attended ticketed multi-night concerts
