= Kick Horns =

British horn section

- Origin: London, UK
- Years active: 1980s–present
- Members: Simon C. Clarke; Tim Sanders; Roddy Lorimer
- Website: kickhorns.com

Kick Horns are a UK horn section based in London. They have worked prolifically as session musicians with a wide variety of performers, and have also recorded as an ensemble. The Kick Horns were established in the 1980s by Simon C. Clarke and Tim Sanders on saxophones, and Roddy Lorimer on trumpet.

== Career highlights ==
They played on the Spice Girls UK Christmas No.1 single "Too Much" in 1997 and their follow up single Stop in 1998. They also played on "Green Light" by Beyoncé, "Let Me Go" by Maverick Sabre and Once Upon a Time in the West by Hard-Fi. They have toured extensively with Eric Clapton and played on his albums From the Cradle and Back Home. Other live work includes stints with The Who, The Waterboys, Baaba Maal, Deacon Blue and German superstar Westernhagen. They also provided horns for recent hits for Sigma feat. Paloma Faith ("Changing", a UK no.1 single in autumn 2014), Little Mix's "Salute", Ella Eyre’s "If I Go", and Olly Murs' "Never Been Better".

Other prominent appearances include Steel Wheels by The Rolling Stones, White City by Pete Townshend and About Face by David Gilmour. Notable contributions were made to Connected by the Stereo MCs, Modern Life Is Rubbish, Parklife and The Great Escape by Blur, Anutha Zone by Dr. John and Want One by Rufus Wainwright. Among many other artists on their CV are The Imagined Village, the Beautiful South, Spice Girls, Levellers, Jamiroquai, Chris Rea, S Club 7, Spiritualized, Groove Armada, Gabrielle, Supergrass, The Verve, It Bites, Dodgy, Shed Seven, Primal Scream, Finley Quaye, China Crisis, Erasure and Little Mix

They are known for their work with African artists including Baaba Maal, Oumou Sangare, Maryam Mursal, Cheb Khaled, Faudel and Rachid Taha, and also have been part of many Africa Express gigs.

They have their own studio, the Tall Place, in Nunhead, South East London. In 2001, they released an album called The Other Foot.
