= Bernard Fowler =

American musician

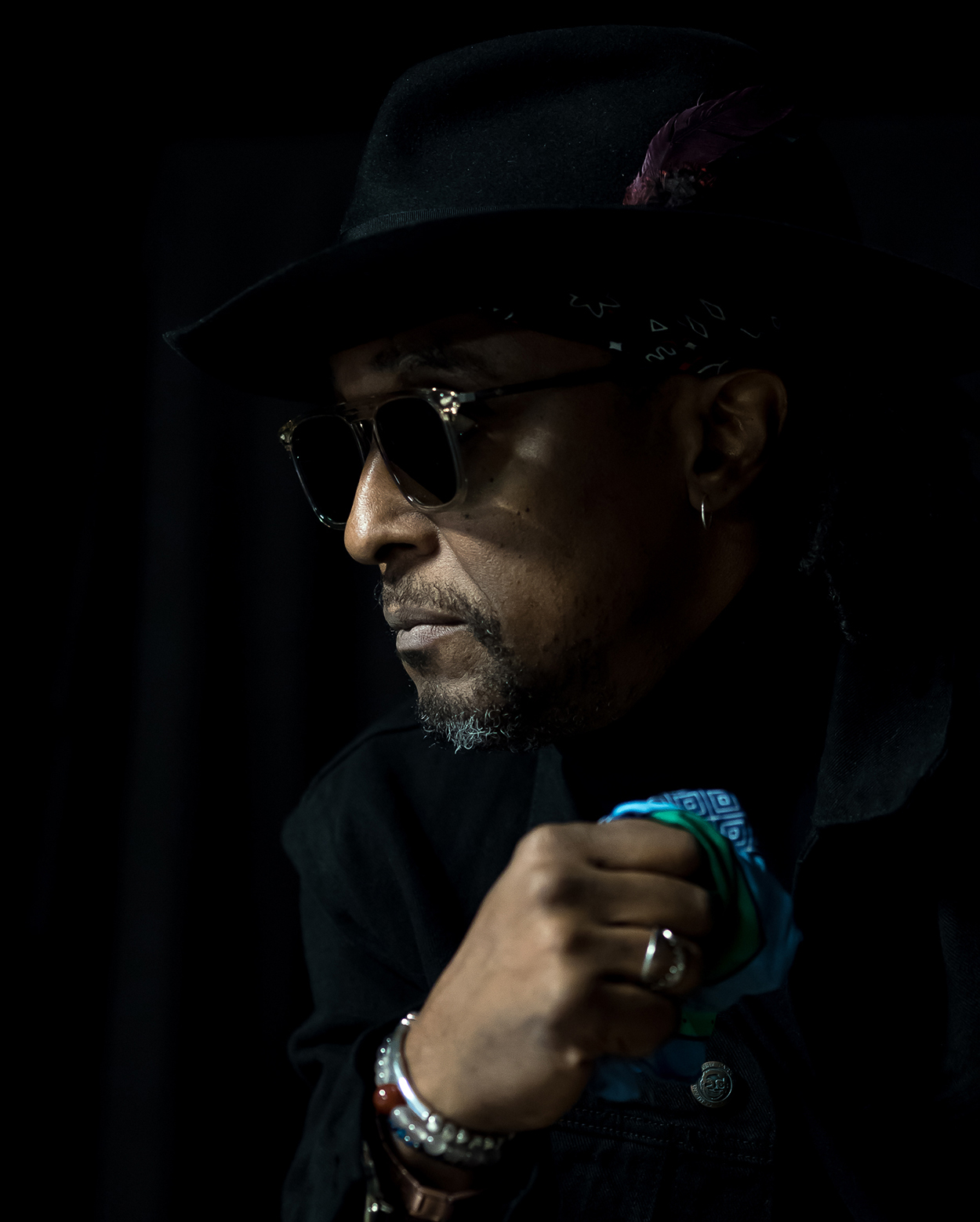
- Bernard Fowler publicity photo, 2019

Background information
- Born: R. Bernard Fowler; January 2, 1960 (age 66); New York City, United States
- Genres: Electro; rock; rock & roll; funk; R&B; blues; country rock; reggae; blues rock; gospel
- Occupations: Musician; producer; songwriter; actor
- Instruments: Vocals; percussion
- Years active: 1974-present
- Labels: Atlantic; Rolling Stones; Sony
- Website: Bernard Fowler.com

Bernard Fowler (born January 2, 1960) is an American musician. He is known for a long association with The Rolling Stones, providing backing vocals since 1989 and on their studio recordings and live tours. Fowler has been a featured guest vocalist on the majority of solo albums released by the members of that band. He has released two solo albums, and he has also been a regular featured singer on other musicians' recordings and tours. Fowler has toured and recorded with the bands Tackhead and Bad Dog and occasionally with Nicklebag and Little Axe.

== Career ==
Fowler's first recordings were with the group The Total Eclipse for the album A Great Combination released 1975. In the early 1980s he was a member of The New York City Peech Boys with DJ Larry Levan and keyboard player Michael De Benedictus. The group had dance hits with tracks like "Don't Make Me Wait" and "Life Is Something Special". He provided vocals for the songs "I'm the One" and "Come Down" from the Material album One Down, where he was credited as a songwriter on several tracks. In 1982 Fowler sang on the Celluloid Records release Do The Smurf For What It's Worth. Fowler guested on Herbie Hancock's classic electro-funk albums Future Shock (1983) and Sound-System (1984), as well as the 1985 albums Compact Disc by Public Image Ltd and Language Barrier by Sly & Robbie. In 1986, he sang a song written by Philip Glass (music) and Paul Simon (lyrics), which appeared on Philip Glass's Songs from Liquid Days. In 1987 he sang backup for James Blood Ulmer on America – Do You Remember the Love?, and the next year he appeared on Bootsy Collins's What's Bootsy Doin'?. Fowler was the lead singer for the group Tackhead for several albums in the late 1980s and early 1990s. He has also appeared on albums from Herb Alpert, Little Axe, Todd Terry, Michael Hutchence, (formerly of INXS) and Tackhead. In 1988 Fowler found himself touring with Steven Seagal.

=== The Rolling Stones ===
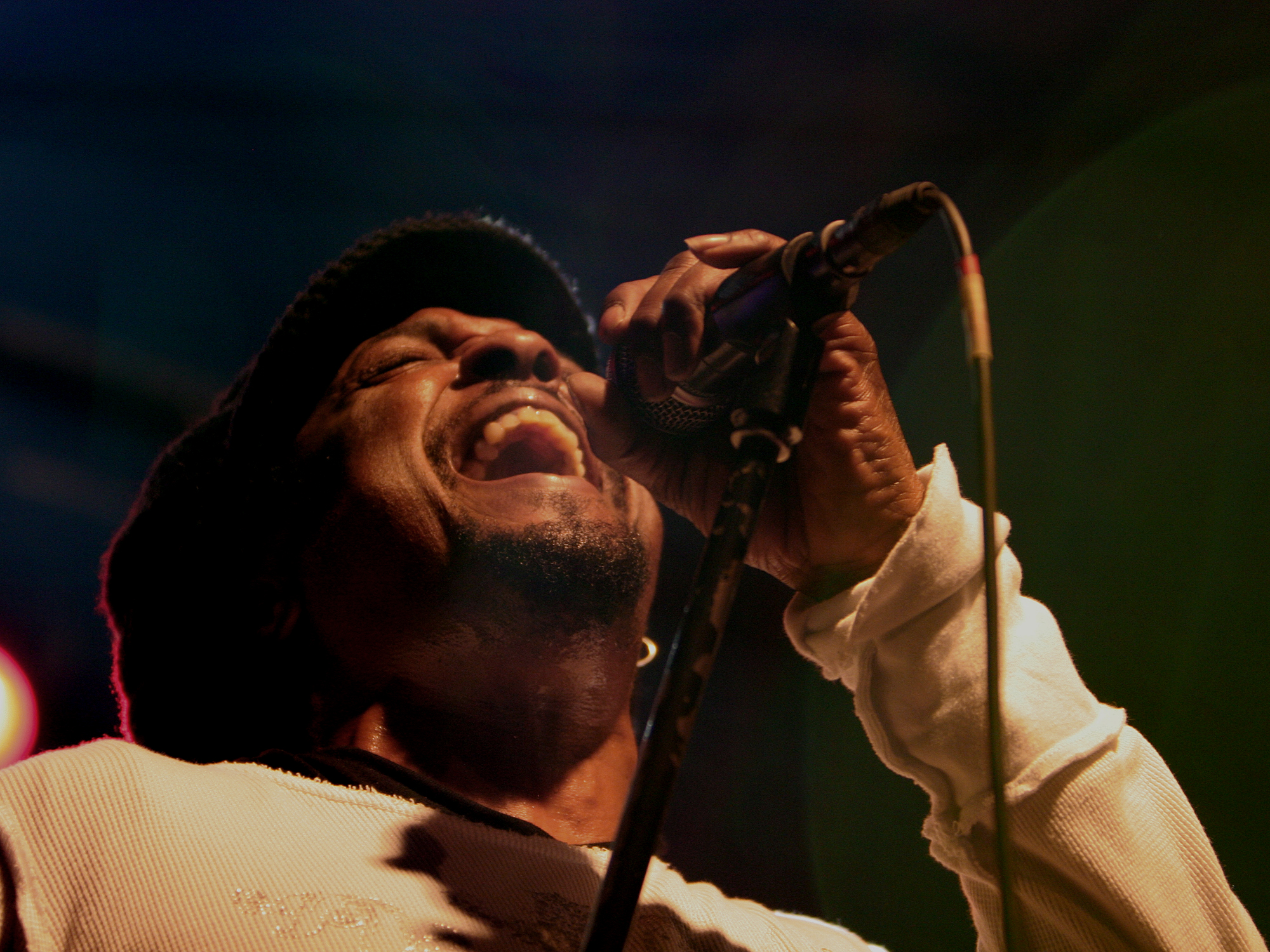
Fowler in Potsdam, Germany; March 8th 2007 performing with The Rolling Stones

In 1985, Fowler was hired to record backing vocals on Mick Jagger's first solo album, She's the Boss. This proved to be the beginning of a lasting business and personal relationship, not only with Jagger, but with all the current members of the Rolling Stones, as he has also performed on the solo albums of Charlie Watts, Keith Richards and Ron Wood. After Fowler had already performed as a session musician with individual members of the Rolling Stones on their solo projects, he was chosen to join the Stones on their Steel Wheels world tour, in 1989. Mick Jagger spoke about his choice of Fowler to sing backing vocals saying that Fowler impressed him because he had a wide vocal range, many musical influences, and stamina.

He has remained as a regular backup singer on tours with the Stones since then. Fowler was a feature vocalist on three of Watts' jazz solo albums. The other members of the Rolling Stones have utilized his vocal talents on their solo projects, including Richards' Main Offender and Wood's solo projects.

== Songwriting and projects ==
Fowler was asked to collaborate on songs from other artists. One such person has been Ron Wood in writing and composing songs for his solo albums. Fowler and Wood have co-written several songs and recorded them on Wood's albums.

In 2006, Fowler released his first solo album, Friends with Privileges, on Sony Japan. This is his first entirely solo effort, however, he has had a significant number of rock and roll and R&B heavyweights in the music industry working with him. They include Ron Wood, Darryl Jones and Lisa Fischer of Rolling Stones fame; studio session musician and record producer Waddy Wachtel, the Red Hot Chili Peppers, Robert Plant, Dave Abbruzzese (formerly of Pearl Jam), Joe Elliot (of Def Leppard), and Ivan Neville. His newest project is called the IMF's.

In May 2011, he appeared as a special guest joining Argentine musician Charly Garcia playing a concert in Montevideo, Uruguay.

== Discography ==
=== With The Rolling Stones and their solo projects ===
- (1985) She's the Boss (Mick Jagger)
- (1989) Steel Wheels (Rolling Stones)
- (1991) Flashpoint (Rolling Stones)
- (1992) Tribute to Charlie Parker with Strings (Charlie Watts)
- (1992) Slide on This (Ronnie Wood)
- (1992) Main Offender (Keith Richards)
- (1993) Warm and Tender (Charlie Watts)
- (1993) Slide on Live: Plugged in and Standing (Ronnie Wood)
- (1993) Jump Back (Rolling Stones)
- (1994) Voodoo Lounge (Rolling Stones)
- (1995) Stripped (Rolling Stones)
- (1996) Long Ago and Far Away (Charlie Watts)
- (1997) Bridges to Babylon (Rolling Stones)
- (1998) No Security (Rolling Stones)
- (2000) Live and Eclectic (Ronnie Wood)
- (2002) Forty Licks (Rolling Stones)
- (2004) Live Licks (Rolling Stones)
- (2005) A Bigger Bang (Rolling Stones)
- (2005) Rarities 1971–2003 (Rolling Stones)
- (2008) Shine a Light (Rolling Stones)
- (2010) I Feel Like Playing (Ronnie Wood)
- (2012) Light the Fuse (Rolling Stones) (a digital download through Google Music)
- (2012) GRRR! (Rolling Stones) compilation album
- (2013) Hyde Park Live (Rolling Stones)
- (2015) From the Vault – Live at the Tokyo Dome (Rolling Stones)
- (2015) Sticky Fingers Live (Rolling Stones)
- (2015) Hyde Park Live (Rolling Stones)
- (2015) Crosseyed Heart (Keith Richards)
- (2016) Totally Stripped (Rolling Stones)
- (2016) Havana Moon (Rolling Stones)
- (2017) Sticky Fingers – Live At The Fonda Theatre 2015 (Rolling Stones)
- (2018) San Jose '99 (Rolling Stones)
- (2018) Voodoo Lounge Uncut (Rolling Stones)
- (2019) Bridges to Bremen (Rolling Stones)
- (2019) HONK (Rolling Stones) compilation album incl. live CD (Lim. ed.)
- (2019) Bridges to Buenos Aires (Rolling Stones)
- (2020) Steel Wheels Live (Rolling Stones)
- (2021) A Bigger Bang Live (10" Vinyl, 2 track, RSD 2021)
- (2021) A Bigger Bang: Live on Copacabana Beach (Rolling Stones)
- (2022) Licked Live in NYC (Rolling Stones)
- (2022) Grrr Live! (Rolling Stones)
- (2023) Anthology (Charlie Watts)
- (2024) Live at the Wiltern (Rolling Stones)
- (2024) Welcome to Shepherd's Bush (Rolling Stones)

=== With others ===
- (1982) Smurf For What It's Worth (The Smurfs)
- (1982) Don't Make Me Wait (Peech Boys)
- (1982) Life Is Something Special (Peech Boys)
- (1982) One Down (Material)
- (1982) Future Shock (Herbie Hancock)
- (1983) I Need You Now (Sinnamon)
- (1983) Crazy Cuts (Grandmixer DST)
- (1984) Do You Believe (The Mariner's Baptist Church Choir) Beat Street soundtrack and movie
- (1984) Sound-System (Herbie Hancock)
- (1985) Starpeace (Yoko Ono)
- (1985) Language Barrier (Sly & Robbie)
- (1986) Futurista (Ryuichi Sakamoto)
- (1986) Media Bahn Live (Ryuichi Sakamoto)
- (1986) Songs from Liquid Days (Philip Glass)
- (1986) Axis (Jonas Hellborg)
- (1986) Album (Public Image, Ltd.)
- (1987) America – Do You Remember the Love? (James Blood Ulmer)
- (1988) What's Bootsy Doin'? (Bootsy Collins)
- (1988) Bass (Jonas Hellborg)
- (1990) Strange Things (Tackhead)
- (1990) Liberty (Duran Duran)
- (1991) Videohead (Tackhead)
- (1991) Johnnie B. Bad (Johnnie Johnson)
- (1992) No Other World (Shining Path)
- (1992) Onobox (Yoko Ono)
- (1993) Stain (Living Colour)
- (1994) Jazz Passengers in Love (Roy Nathanson's Jazz Passengers)
- (1996) 12 Hits and a Bump (Nicklebag)
- (1997) Power Inc. (Tackhead)
- (1999) Michael Hutchence (Michael Hutchence)
- (1999) Colors (Herb Alpert)
- (2000) Hot Night Tonight (Barbara Lynn)
- (2001) Best of Material (Material)
- (2004) Champagne & Grits (Little Axe)
- (2008) Along Came a Spider (Alice Cooper)
- (2008) Ever Changing Times (Steve Lukather)
- (2010) All's Well That Ends Well (Steve Lukather)
- (2010) Bought for a Dollar, Sold for a Dime (Little Axe)
- (2013) Ronin (Tao Of Sound)
- (2023) Heavy Hitters II (George Lynch and Jeff Pilson)

== Personal discography ==
- (2006) Friends With Privileges (Bernard Fowler) (Sony Japan)
- (2015) The Bura (Bernard Fowler) (MRI)
- (2019) Inside Out (Rhyme & Reason Records)

== Personal life ==
Actress Jane Arakawa (Street Trash) met Fowler on Pearl Harbor Day in 1984 and married on 11 December 1988.

== See also ==
- Rock 'n' Roll Guns for Hire: The Story of the Sidemen
