= Brown Sugar (Rolling Stones song) =

1971 single by the Rolling Stones

Single by the Rolling Stones

from the album Sticky Fingers
- B-side: "Bitch"/"Let It Rock" (UK)
- Released: 16 April 1971
- Recorded: 2–4 December 1969
- Studio: Muscle Shoals (Sheffield)
- Genre: Hard rock; rock and roll; blues rock; boogie rock
- Length: 3:50
- Label: Rolling Stones
- Songwriter: Jagger–Richards
- Producer: Jimmy Miller

The Rolling Stones singles chronology
"Honky Tonk Women" (1969)	"Brown Sugar" (1971)	"Wild Horses" (1971)

Official audio
- "Brown Sugar" (Remastered 2009) on YouTube

"Brown Sugar" is a song recorded by the English rock band the Rolling Stones. Written primarily by Mick Jagger, it is the opening track and lead single from their ninth studio album, Sticky Fingers (1971). It became a number one hit in both the United States and Canada. In the United Kingdom and Ireland, it charted at number two. In the United States, Billboard ranked it as the number 16 song for 1971.

Rolling Stone ranked it number 495 on its list of the 500 Greatest Songs of All Time in 2010, number 490 in 2004, and at number five on their list of the 100 Greatest Guitar Songs of All Time (2004).

== Inspiration and recording ==
Though credited to Jagger–Richards, "Brown Sugar" was primarily the work of Jagger, who wrote it sometime during the filming of Ned Kelly in 1969. According to Marsha Hunt, Jagger's girlfriend and the mother of his first child Karis, he wrote the song with her in mind. Former Ikette Claudia Lennear disputes this claim, saying that it was written about her. In 2014, Lennear told The Times that she is the subject of the song because she was dating Jagger when it was written. Bill Wyman stated in his book Rolling with the Stones (2002) that the lyrics were partially inspired by Lennear.

"Brown Sugar" was recorded over a three-day period at Muscle Shoals Sound Studio in Sheffield, Alabama, from 2 to 4 December 1969. The song was not released until over a year later due to legal wranglings with the band's former label. At the request of guitarist Mick Taylor (who had joined the band as Brian Jones's replacement in July 1969), the Stones debuted the number live during the infamous concert at the Altamont Speedway on 6 December 1969.

In the liner notes to the compilation album Jump Back (1993), Jagger says, "The lyric was all to do with the dual combination of drugs and girls. This song was a very instant thing, a definite high point".

In a December 1995 Rolling Stone interview, Jagger spoke at length about the song, its inspiration, and its success, and credited himself with its lyrics. Keith Richards also credits Jagger with the song in his autobiography. Jagger attributed the success of the song to a "good groove". After noting that the lyrics could mean so many lewd subjects, he again noted that the combination of those subjects, the lyrical ambiguity was partially why the song was considered successful. He noted, "That makes it... the whole mess thrown in. God knows what I'm on about on that song. It's such a mishmash. All the nasty subjects in one go... I never would write that song now." When interviewer Jann Wenner asked him why, Jagger replied, "I would probably censor myself. I'd think, 'Oh God, I can't. I've got to stop. I can't just write raw like that.'"

An alternative version was recorded on 18 December 1970 at Olympic Studios in London during a birthday party for Richards and Bobby Keys. It features appearances by Al Kooper on piano, and Eric Clapton on slide guitar. The alternative version, which had previously been available only on bootleg recordings, was released in June 2015 on the Deluxe and Super Deluxe editions of the reissued Sticky Fingers album.

== Release ==
"Brown Sugar" was released in April 1971 as the first single from the album, and the first single offered by the Rolling Stones Records label. While the US single featured only "Bitch" as the B-side, the British release also featured a live rendition of Chuck Berry's "Let It Rock", recorded at the University of Leeds during the 1971 tour of the United Kingdom.

It is one of two Rolling Stones songs (along with "Wild Horses") licensed to both the band and former manager Allen Klein (a result of various business disagreements), resulting in its inclusion on the compilation albums Hot Rocks 1964–1971, Singles Collection: The London Years, Singles 1968–1971, and the 2007 edition of Rolled Gold: The Very Best of the Rolling Stones. The song was also included on a number of the band's non-Klein compilations, including Made in the Shade, Rewind (1971–1984), Jump Back, Forty Licks, GRRR!, and The Singles 1971–2006.

To promote the song, the Rolling Stones performed on Top of the Pops with the performance taped sometime around late March 1971 and broadcast on 15 April and 6 May. They performed "Brown Sugar", "Wild Horses" and "Bitch" for the show's segment dedicated to albums, which was shown on 22 April 1971; due to BBC practices at the time, the other performances were erased and all that remains is "Brown Sugar". Saxophone player Trevor Lawrence mimes to Bobby Keys's actual solo.

In the United Kingdom and the United States, the single was originally issued in mono using a rarely heard studio chatter. This mono mix is different from the album's stereo mix, and has not been released on any compilation.

The song was first performed live during the free concert at Altamont, and was performed routinely during the Rolling Stones' 1970 European tour, occupying a prominent spot near the end of the set list even though audiences were unfamiliar with it. The band opened the shows of their infamous 1972 American tour with "Brown Sugar", and it has since become a Stones concert staple. However, Jagger has changed some of the more controversial lyrics when performing the song live. For example, the first verse line "I hear him whip the women just around midnight" has been replaced with "you should have heard him just around midnight."

== Critical reception ==
Writing for Sounds in 1971, Penny Valentine praised "Brown Sugar", stating that it was her "choice as the best track". Cash Box described the song as returning to "the fresh blues sound of the team's pre-Satanic days" with a "sax break, gritty wailing and the unique stones rhythm work." Record World said that it "is firmly in [the Rolling Stones'] hallowed tradition of gritty, groovy music." Writing for The Rag, rock critic Mike Saunders found the single to be the "only especially noteworthy" track of Sticky Fingers (1971).

The lyrical subject matter has been a point of interest and controversy. Described by rock critic Robert Christgau as "a rocker so compelling that it discourages exegesis", the song's popularity has often overshadowed its provocative lyrics, which explore a number of controversial subjects, including slavery, interracial sex, cunnilingus, and drug use.

In 2021, the band announced that the song would be removed from the setlist of their US tour.

== Cover versions ==
Little Richard recorded a rendition of "Brown Sugar" for his album The King of Rock and Roll, released in 1971.

== Chart performance ==
=== Weekly charts ===
Chart (1971)	Peak position
Australia	5
Austria (Ö3 Austria Top 40)	10
Belgium (Ultratop 50 Flanders)	7
Canada Top Singles (RPM)	1
Finland (Suomen Virallinen)	11
Germany (GfK)	4
Ireland (IRMA)	2
New Zealand (Listener)	11
Norway (VG-lista)	4
Netherlands (Single Top 100)	1
Rhodesia (Lyons Maid)	7
South Africa	20
Spain Singles Chart	5
Sweden (Tio i Topp)	11
Switzerland (Schweizer Hitparade)	1
UK Singles (Official Charts)	2
US Billboard Hot 100	1

=== Year-end charts ===
Chart (1971)	Rank
Australia	38
Canada	3
Netherlands (Dutch Top 40)	22
US Billboard Hot 100	18
US Cash Box	38

== Certifications ==
Region	Certification	Certified units/sales
Australia (ARIA)	Platinum	70,000^{‡}
United Kingdom (BPI) Physical	Silver	250,000^{^}
United Kingdom (BPI) Digital	Platinum	600,000^{‡}
^{^} Shipments figures based on certification alone.^{‡} Sales+streaming figures based on certification alone.

== Personnel ==
Credits adapted from Philippe Margotin and Jean-Michel Guesdon's The Rolling Stones: All the Songs, Andy Babiuk and Greg Prevost's Rolling Stones Gear, Martin Elliott's The Rolling Stones Complete Recording Sessions, and the official album liner notes.

The Rolling Stones

- Mick Jagger – lead and backing vocals, percussion
- Keith Richards – electric guitar, acoustic guitar, backing vocals
- Mick Taylor – electric guitar
- Bill Wyman – bass guitar
- Charlie Watts – drums

Additional personnel

- Ian Stewart – piano
- Bobby Keys – tenor saxophone
- Jimmy Miller – producer
- Jimmy Johnson – engineer
- Glyn Johns – engineer
- Andy Johns – engineer
