= Gendel =

Gendel is a surname, a transliteration from Russian spelling 'Гендель' of the German surnames Hendel and Händel. Notable people with the surname include:

- Milton Gendel (1918–2018), American photographer and art critic
- Morgan Gendel (born 1952), American screenwriter and television producer
- Sam Gendel, American saxophonist and music producer

== See also ==
- Handel/Händel, Haendel, Handl/Händl, Heindel, Heindl, Hendel, Gendel
