= Millinsky =

French designer and entrepreneur

Alexandre Daillance
- Born: Alexandre Daillance; 1997 (age 28–29)
- Education: Wesleyan University
- Occupation: Designer
- Years active: 2014-present
- Notable work: Rolling Stones tongue redesign for No Filter Tour, NasaSeasons
- Website: millinsky.com

Alexandre Daillance (born 1997), also known by his stage name Millinsky, is a French designer and entrepreneur. Millinsky has worked with various artists, including the Rolling Stones on a redesign of the band's Tongue and lips logo for their No Filter Tour, and was named to the Forbes 30 Under 30 list in 2019.

== Early life ==
Alexandre Daillance was born in the Paris suburb of Neuilly-sur-Seine in 1997 and attended Wesleyan University in Middletown, Connecticut.

== Career ==
=== NasaSeasons ===
Millinsky co-founded the party brand Nasa collective together with friends, though found he was more interested in design. In 2014, he founded the streetwear clothing label NasaSeasons (stylized NASASEASONS) with five friends. Speaking of his inspirations for the brand, he told Vice that he was a "fan of Tumblr, of the street wear aesthetic" in third grade and spent his "time looking up the images." Millinsky has used Instagram as his primary marketing tool, private messaging celebrities in hopes of getting his products featured. NasaSeasons first gained notoriety the following year, when a picture of Rihanna wearing one of his branded hats was published. Shortly after this, Millinsky declined a large contract with Urban Outfitters as it "would have killed the underground aspect of the brand." In following years, the brand has become popular with other celebrities, including Wiz Khalifa, Rita Ora, Tyga, Beyoncé, and Kanye West. In 2018, the brand collaborated with Rimowa.

As of 2017, NasaSeasons was carried by "more than a dozen" retailers worldwide, including Colette. The strategy behind their placement is to create exclusivity. That year Millinsky also founded a consulting firm called Lawrence Parker, which "helps brands speak and sell to his social media generation."

=== Prospect 100 ===
During the beginning of the COVID-19 pandemic in 2020, Millinsky and two friends founded the fashion contest Prospect 100 to help showcase young designers. The following year the competition partnered with Kering to design sustainable clothing and with Nickelodeon to "reimagine" the Teenage Mutant Ninja Turtles, with the winner's work being turned into official merchandise. Following the start of the 2022 Russian invasion of Ukraine, Prospect 100 launched a competition to design non-fungible tokens that would be sold to raise funds for the Ukrainian armed forces.

=== Other work ===
Millinsky collaborated with the Rolling Stones in 2018, designing "a special capsule collection" and a No Filter Tour-specific redesign of the band's tongue and lips logo for the tour's European leg. Speaking with Vogue the previous fall, he had told the magazine that designing a "time capsule collection" for the Stones was his "fashion dream", citing his love of their "style and energy" and the band's impact on fashion during the 1960s and 1970s. He subsequently designed a capsule collection for Paul McCartney's Freshen Up tour in 2019 and collaborated on a streetwear clothing capsule collection with Eminem in 2021.

=== Recognition ===
He was named by Forbes magazine to the 2019 Forbes 30 Under 30 in its art and style category.
