= Haendel (surname) =

Haendel is a German-language surname of multiple possible origins, derived from a number of given names or nicknames, similarly to Händel of Heindel. Notable people with the surname include:

- Ida Haendel (1928–2020), Polish-British violinist
- Karl Haendel (born 1976), American artist
- Melissa Haendel, American bioinformaticist

== See also ==
- Handel/Händel, Haendel, Heindel, Heindl, Hendel, Handl/Händl
