= Tongue and lips logo =

Logo of The Rolling Stones

- John Pasche's copyrighted initial design

- Craig Braun's final redesign and trademarked version
- Product type: Logo
- Current owner: Musidor B.V.
- Produced by: John Pasche and Craig Braun of Sound Packaging Corporation
- Country: England
- Introduced: 1971; 55 years ago
- Markets: Music merchandise etc.
- Previous owners: John Pasche
- Registered as a trademark in: UK Intellectual Property Office Trade mark numbers: UK00001051130/1 Registered 20 August 1975; IP Australia Trademark number: 292286 Registered 19 November 1975; United States Patent and Trademark Office Registration Number: 1071347 Description of Mark: The Mark Consists of a Fanciful “Tongue and Lip Design.” Filing Date: 7 June 1976 Registration Date: 16 August 1977
- Website: rollingstoneslogo.com

The tongue and lips logo or alternatively the lips and tongue logo, also known as the Hot Lips logo, or the Rolling Stones Records logo, or simply the Rolling Stones logo, is a logo designed by the English art designer John Pasche for the rock band The Rolling Stones in 1970. It has been called the most famous logo in the history of popular music. The logo has remained on all post-1970 albums and singles by the Rolling Stones, in addition to the band's merchandise (from T-shirts to fire lighters) and their stage sets.

== History ==
The Rolling Stones needed a poster for their 1970 European Tour, but they were unhappy with the designs that were offered to them by their then-record company Decca Records. The band began to look for a design student to design not only the poster, but also a logo or symbol which could be used on note paper, a programme cover and a cover for the press book. John Pasche was in his third and final year at the time on his Master of Arts degree at the Royal College of Art in London 1970 when Mick Jagger approached him, having seen his designs at the final degree show. Having accepted the commission, Pasche started working on the poster. Jagger accepted his second and final version.

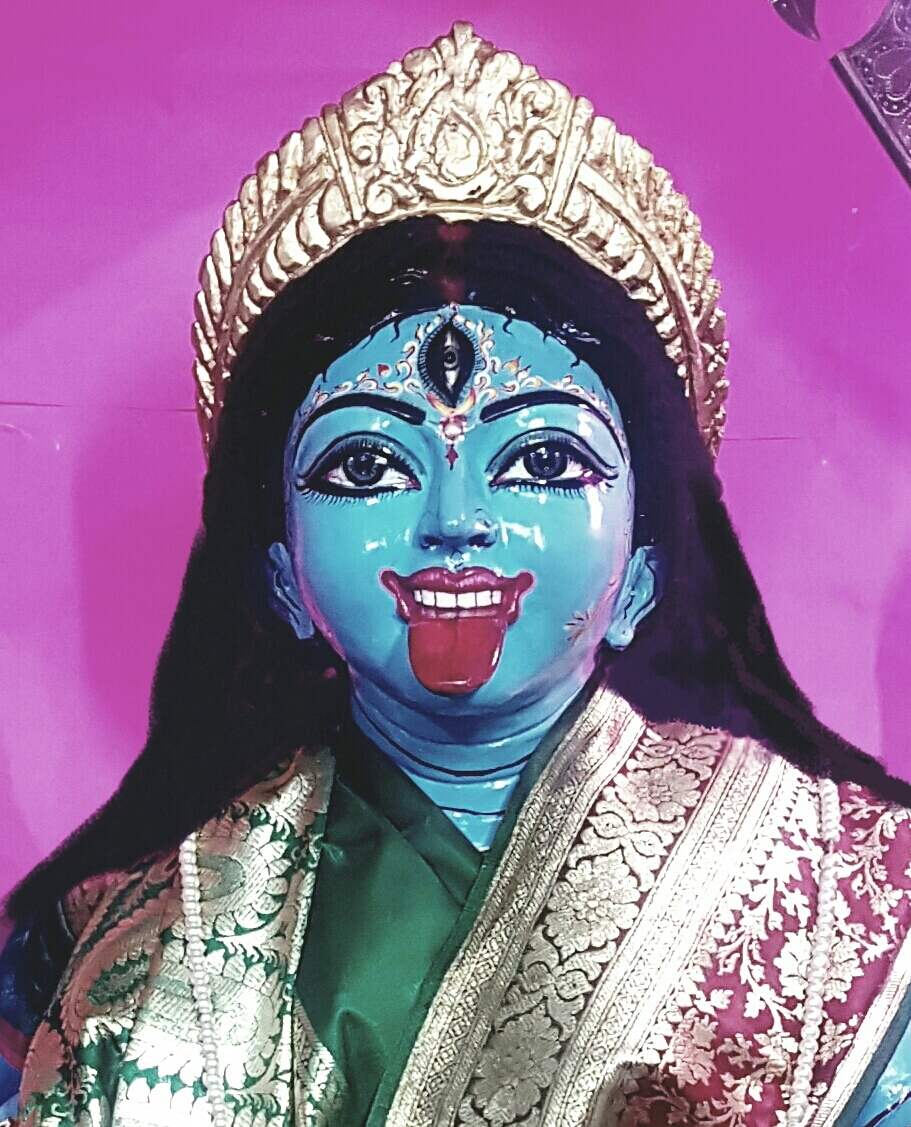
Kali sticking out her red tongue

For the logo, Jagger had suggested the tongue of the Hindu goddess Kali. Pasche said at the time, "The design concept for the tongue was to represent the band's anti-authoritarian attitude, Mick's mouth, and the obvious sexual connotations. I designed it in such a way that it was easily reproduced and in a style I thought could stand the test of time." In an interview with The New York Times, Pasche recalled that, "I didn't want to do anything Indian, because I thought it would be very dated quickly, as everyone was going through that phase at the time". However, it did inspire him to his design. This was seen as highly disrespectful to Hindu sentiments once this was revealed to the public, due to the superimposition of the sacred symbol of deep spiritual significance of a powerful Goddess with a vulgar sexual connotation, and is criticised till today.

In New York, Craig Braun as the owner and creative director of the Sound Packaging Corporation, had a deadline to complete the artwork for the band's Sticky Fingers album and he needed the logo from Pasche.

He (Pasche) had only completed some sketches, rough sketches of it. And Marshall Chess, the newly-named president of Rolling Stones Records, was in London said, All I have is a rubber stamp from the sketch, so I said for him to stamp it a few times, put it on a fax which, on a thermal fax machine, the quality is just shit, but I could see the silhouette of it, where the art student was going, very fuzzy, and about 3/4 of an inch, so I blew that up to about 12" and I had an illustrator working for me and I said, 'I want you to re-draft this for me'. After many a back-and-forth, trial-and-error fleshing-out with the illustrator, the Rolling Stones' tongue and lip logo as we now know it was being hatched. Pasche hadn't finished his logo, so I told them to use his on the English album. Ultimately, it ended up being my version, not his, they use everywhere. They use mine for the tours, merchandising, licensing. Ironically, the V&A Museum paid Pasche almost £100,000 for his original logo art, but it's not the official Stones version. – Craig Braun

Illustrators at Craig Braun's Sound Packaging Corporation finished the logo by narrowing the tongue, adding more white around the lips and tongue, with black to highlight the throat, then blew it up to cover the entire inside sleeve of the American release of Sticky Fingers album. Pasche's version was used internationally. The poster by Pasche for the 1970 European Tour was completed, although the first time that the logo was used was on 26 March 1971, when it appeared on VIP passes to the concert at the Marquee Club, which was at the end of their 1971 UK Tour.

Pasche was paid just £50 in 1970 for the logo, he was paid a further £200 in 1972. In 1984 Pasche sold his copyright of the logo to the Rolling Stones' commercial arm, Musidor BV, for £26,000. In 2008, London's Victoria and Albert Museum (V&A) bought Pasche's original artwork of the Rolling Stones tongue and lips logo for £51,000 ($92,500). The Art Fund paid half towards the artwork at Chicago online auction house, Mastro Auctions. Victoria Broakes, head of exhibitions at the V&A said, "The Rolling Stones' Tongue is one of the first examples of a group using branding and it has become arguably the world's most famous rock logo."

The 50th anniversary tongue and lips logo

In 2012, the band commissioned Shepard Fairey to update the logo for their 50th anniversary.

In my opinion, the Stones' tongue logo is the most iconic, potent and enduring logo in rock & roll history. I think the logo not only captures Mick Jagger's signature lips and tongue, but also the essence of rebellion and sexuality that is the allure of all rock & roll at its finest. When Mick Jagger reached out to me about designing a logo to mark the Rolling Stones' 50th anniversary I was quite overwhelmed. Mick said he was open to any of my ideas. One of the first things I asked Mick was, "Don't you think the tongue HAS to be included?" He responded, "Yeah, I guess it ought to be." I worked on this project as a fan knowing that the Stones' tongue was the focus and the starting point. – Shepard Fairey

After the death of Charlie Watts in 2021, the logo was changed to black for the No Filter Tour in his memory.

=== Creator dispute ===
While The New York Times and others have previously stated that John Pasche created the tongue and lips logo, older sources have indicated otherwise. New York Daily News, Florida Today, CNN, and The Hill state it was Ruby Mazur who created the logo, while the Ottawa Citizen has listed both Mazur and Andy Warhol as probable creators.

== Accolades ==
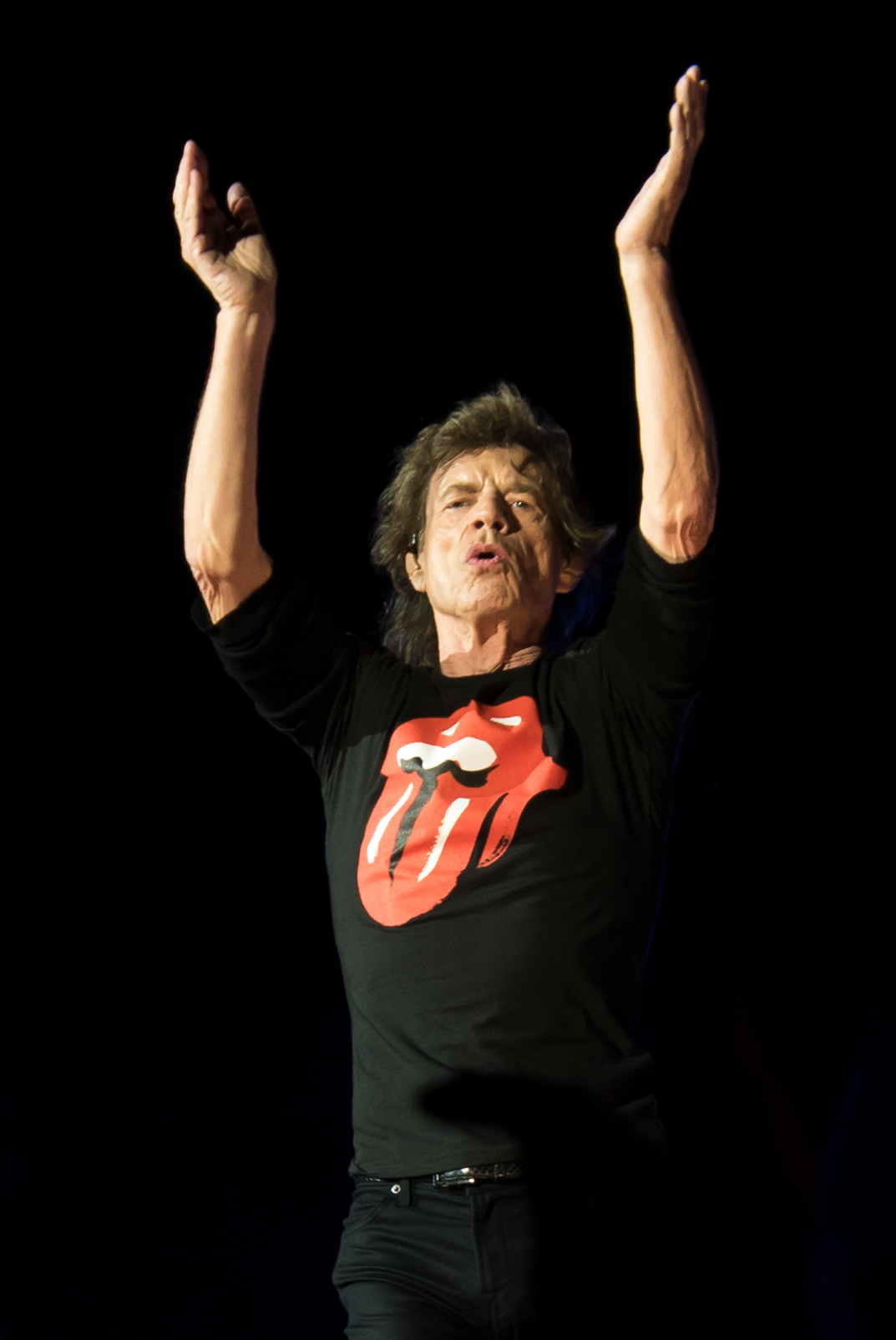
Mick Jagger wearing the tongue and lips logo t-shirt

In a poll of 2,000 UK adults, carried out in 2018 by via OnePoll for Day2, the tongue and lip logo came top in the 50 Most Iconic T-Shirt Designs of All Time, ahead of the image of Che Guevara, the Hard Rock Cafe logo and I ❤ NY.

Sean Egan in his book The Mammoth Book of the Rolling Stones said of the logo, "Regardless of its provenance, the logo is superb. Without using the Stones' name, it instantly conjures them, or at least Jagger, as well as a certain lasciviousness that is the Stones' own... It quickly and deservedly became the most famous logo in the history of popular music."

Tailor Brands named the logo the Best Band Logo in History and the "most iconic band logo in all of rock history".

In 2020, Joobin Bekhrad of The New York Times wrote "It began life as a tiny emblem, something to adorn a 45 r.p.m. single or the band’s letterhead. It quickly became ubiquitous and, ultimately, the most famous logo in rock ’n’ roll. Over 50 years, the legendary “tongue and lips” of the Rolling Stones has been emblazoned on everything."

Creative Review compiled a list of the top commercial logos of all time, with the tongue and lips logo coming in 15th position.

The Sticky Fingers album was the first to feature the logo on the record label for Rolling Stones Records and on the inside cover. The logo was part of a package that, in 2003, VH1 named the "No. 1 Greatest Album Cover" of all time.

== Usage and merchandise ==
The use of the logo has gone far beyond its original use on an album cover, record label, and tour poster; it has become the logo of the band itself, being widely used on Rolling Stones merchandise including, but not limited to, T-shirts, sweatshirts, socks, coasters, luggage tags, whisky flasks, belts, baseball caps, and credit cards. The logo has even been used on the band's aircraft for their concerts tours. The logo has been used on all post-1970 Rolling Stones releases, both on Rolling Stones Records since 1970 and when the band signed to Virgin Records. In 2017, Remi Matsuo designed a variation of the logo for merchandise sold as part of a collaboration between the Rolling Stones and her band Glim Spanky. In 2022, the logo was created in Lego for the Lego Art theme, as part of the band's 60th anniversary.

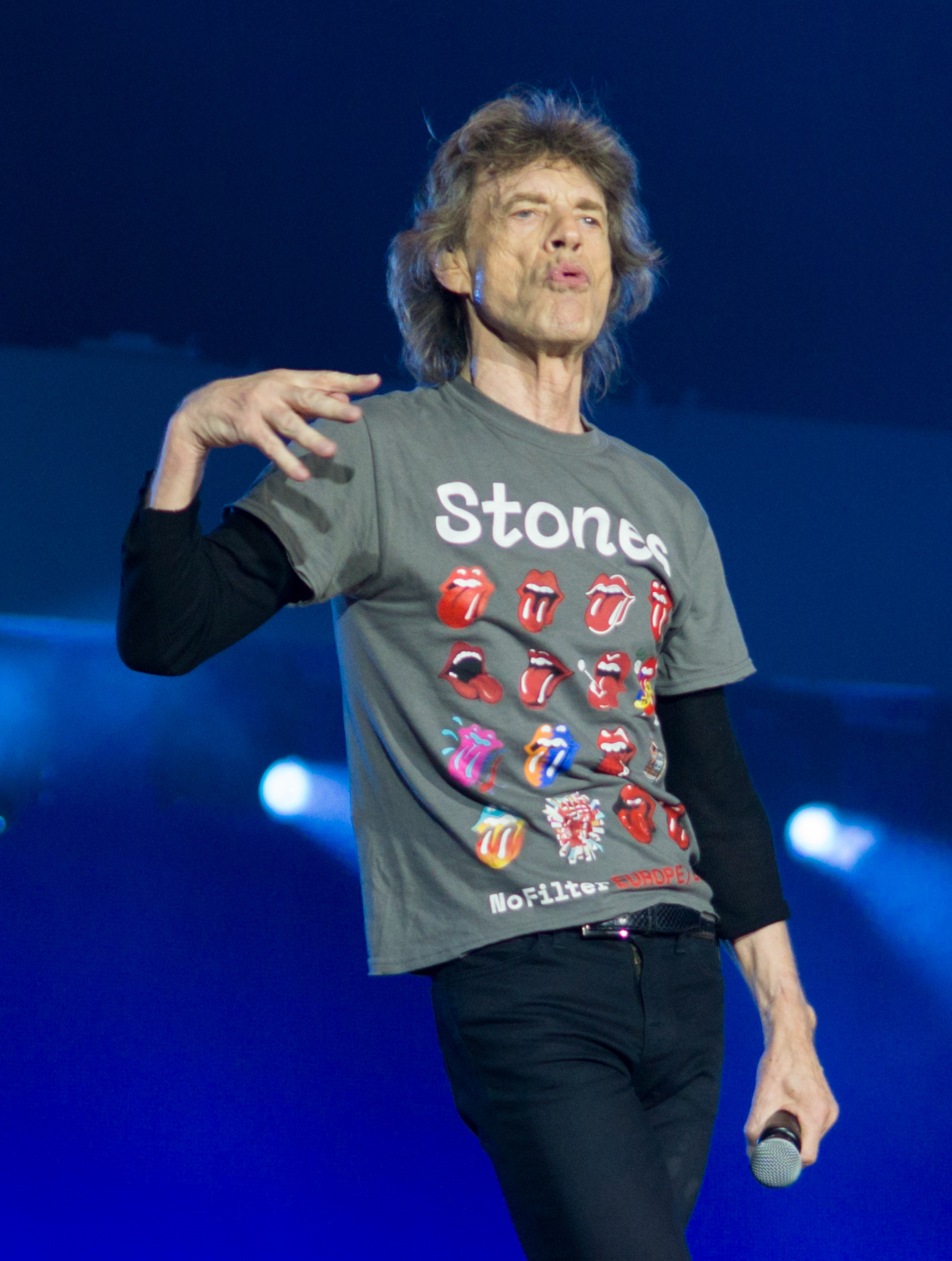
Mick Jagger wearing variations of the logo during the No Filter Tour in Paris, France

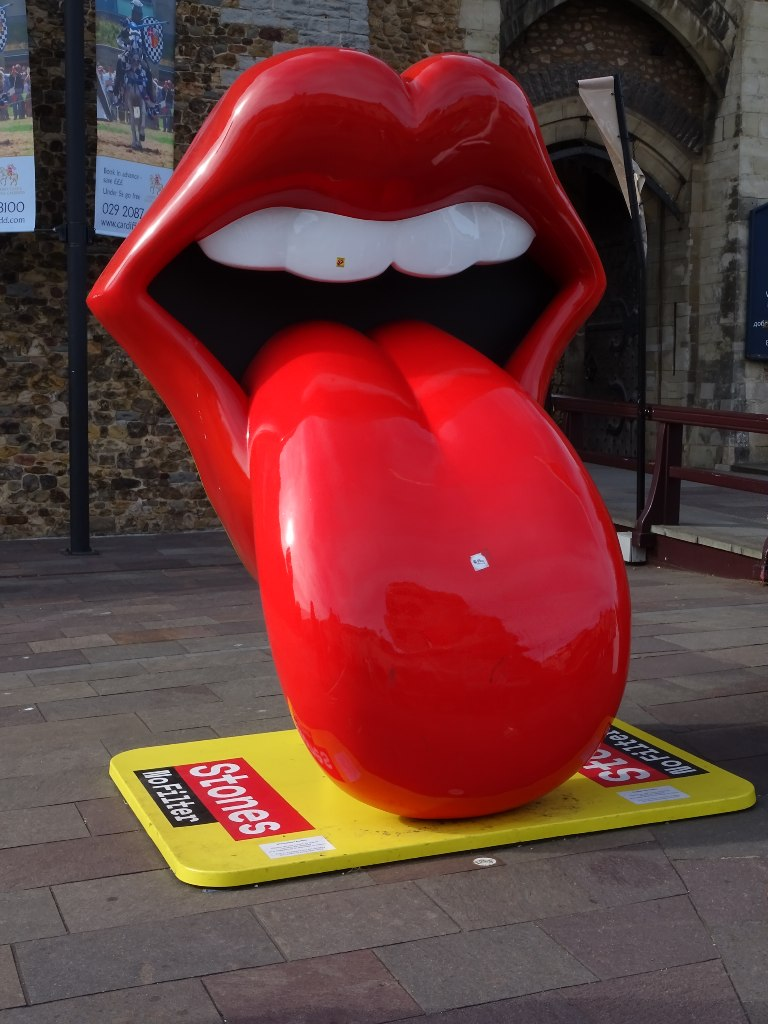
Model of the logo outside Cardiff Castle, Wales, during the No Filter Tour

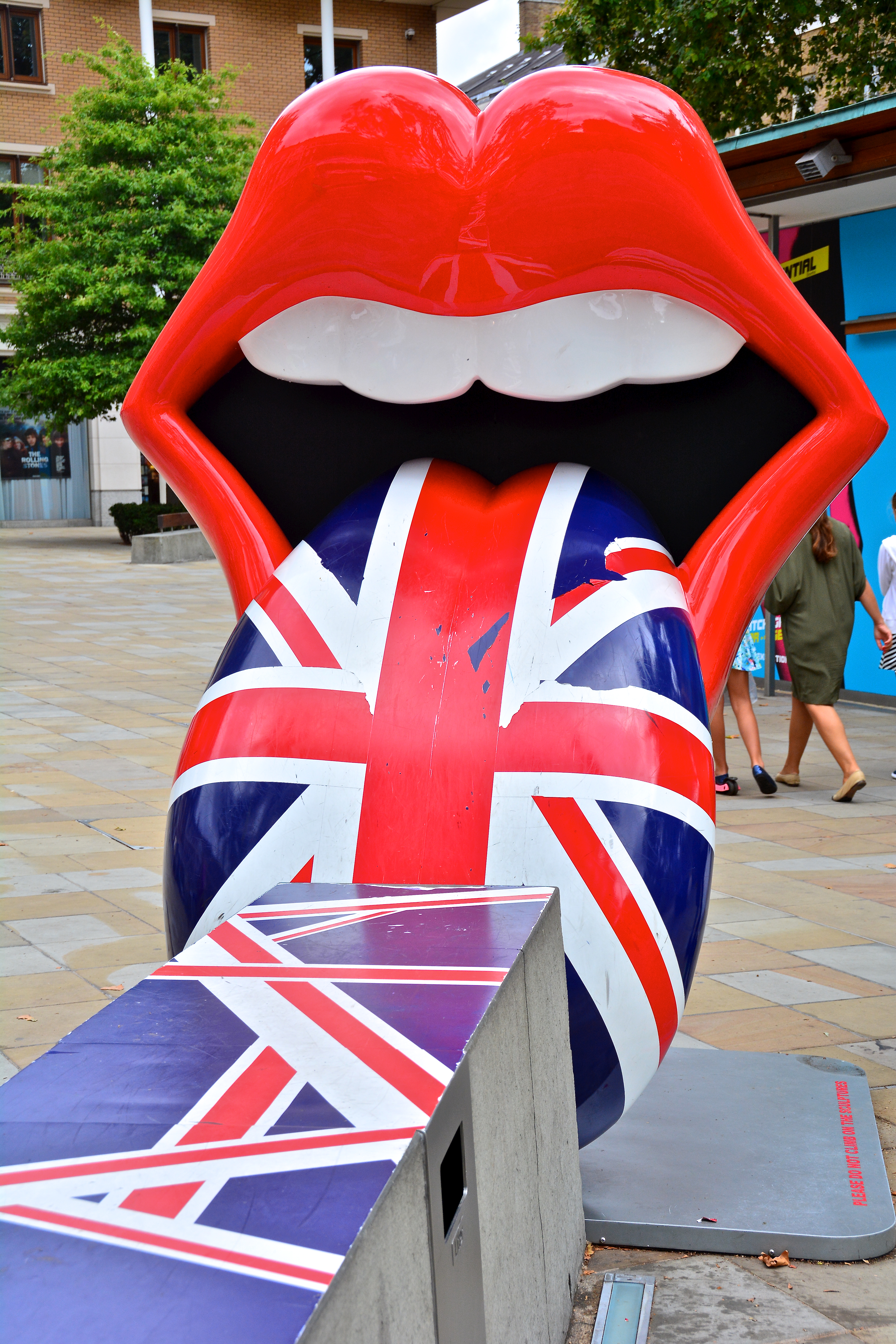
Model of logo with a variation of the UK flag on tongue on the King's Road, London

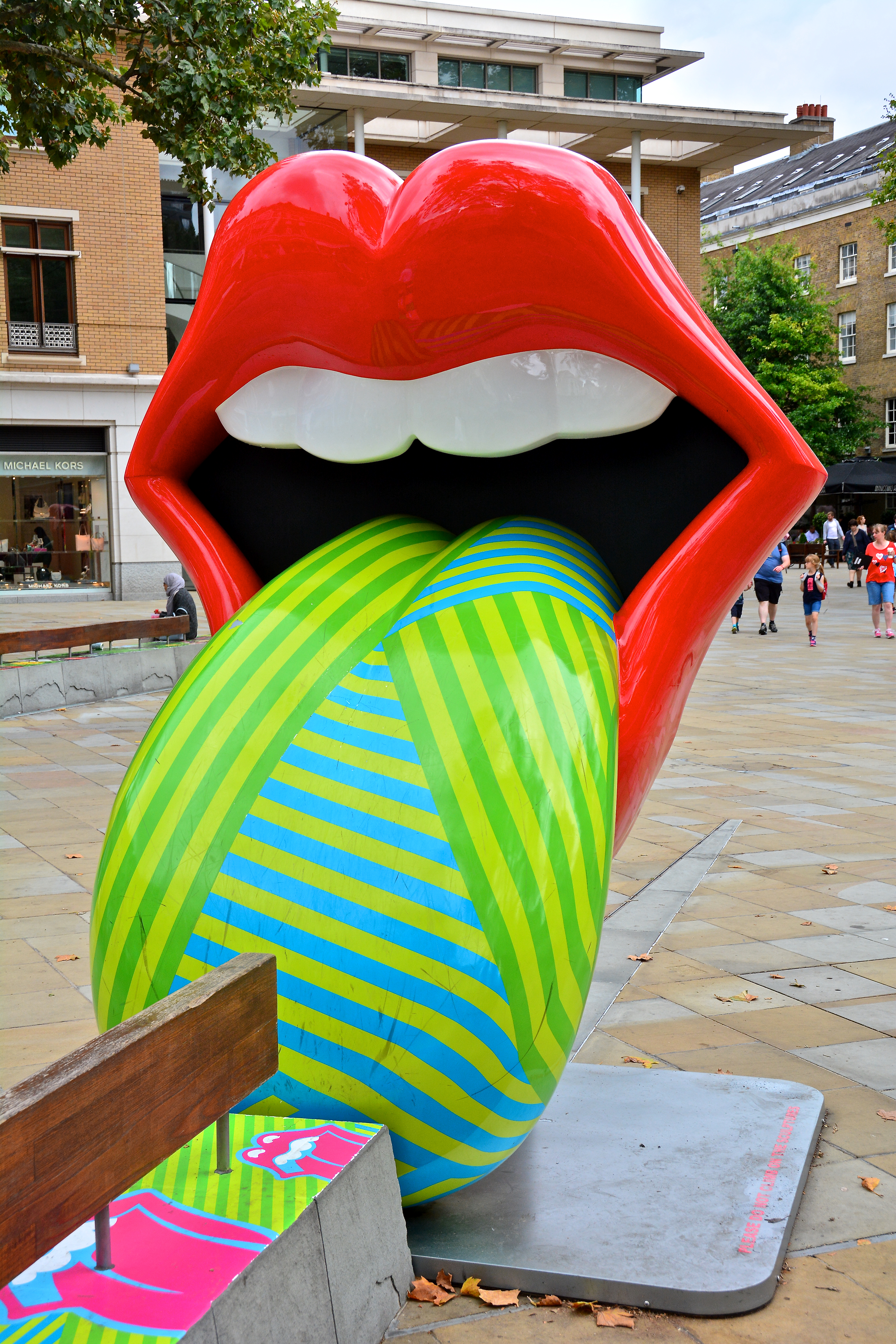
Model of logo with a variation on tongue on the King's Road, London

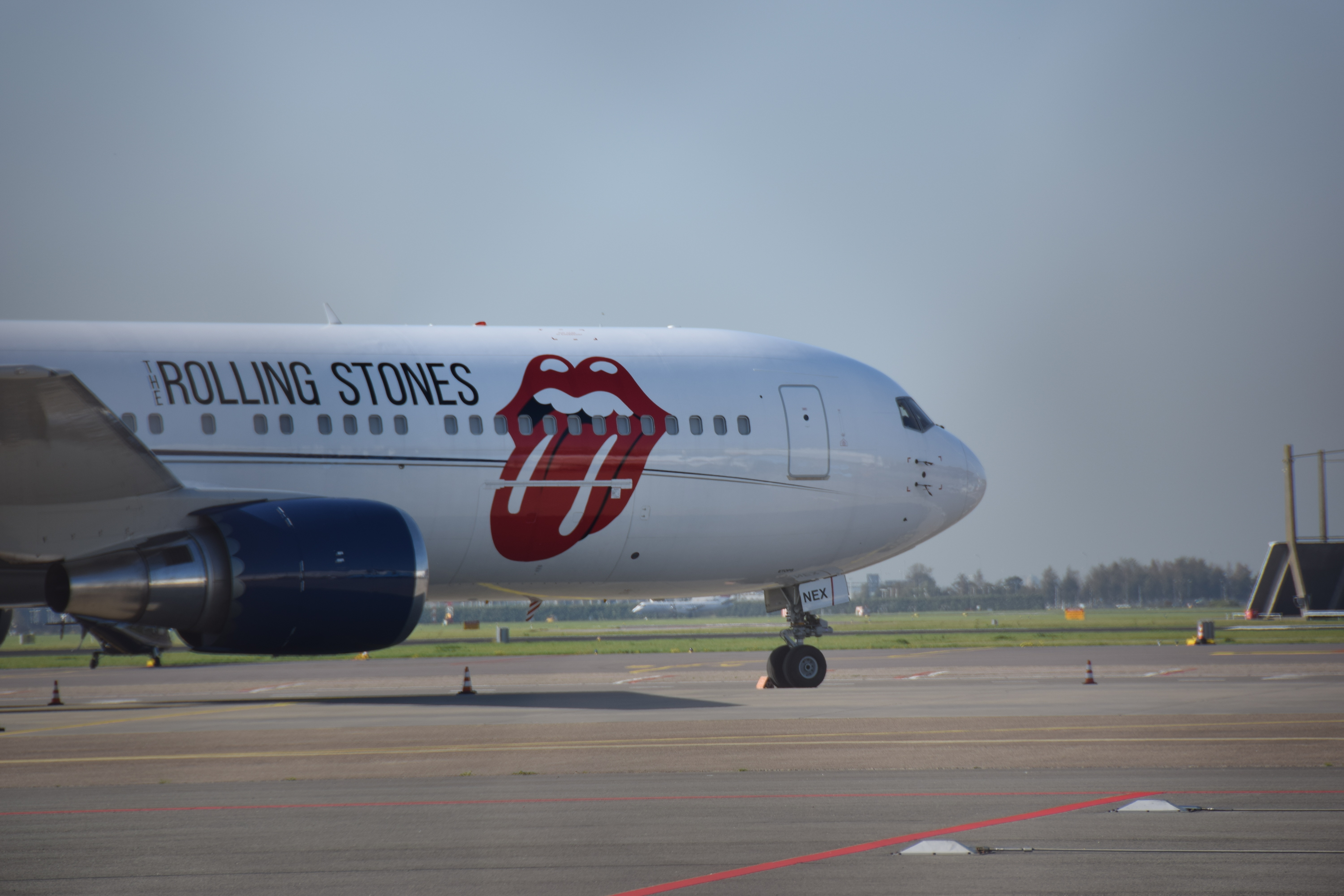
The logo on the Rolling Stones Boeing 767 airplane at Amsterdam Airport Schiphol, the Netherlands

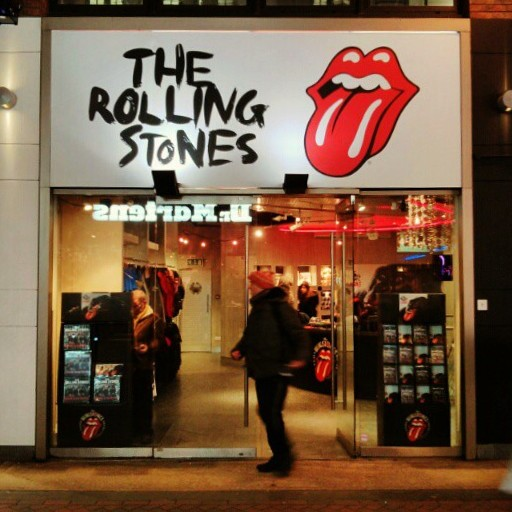
The former Rolling Stones pop-up shop in Carnaby Street, London (since replaced in September 2020 by 'RS No. 9 Carnaby' at 9 Carnaby Street)

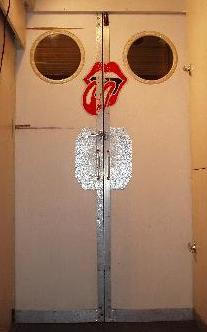
Logo on the entrance to the former Rolling Stones Mobile Studio

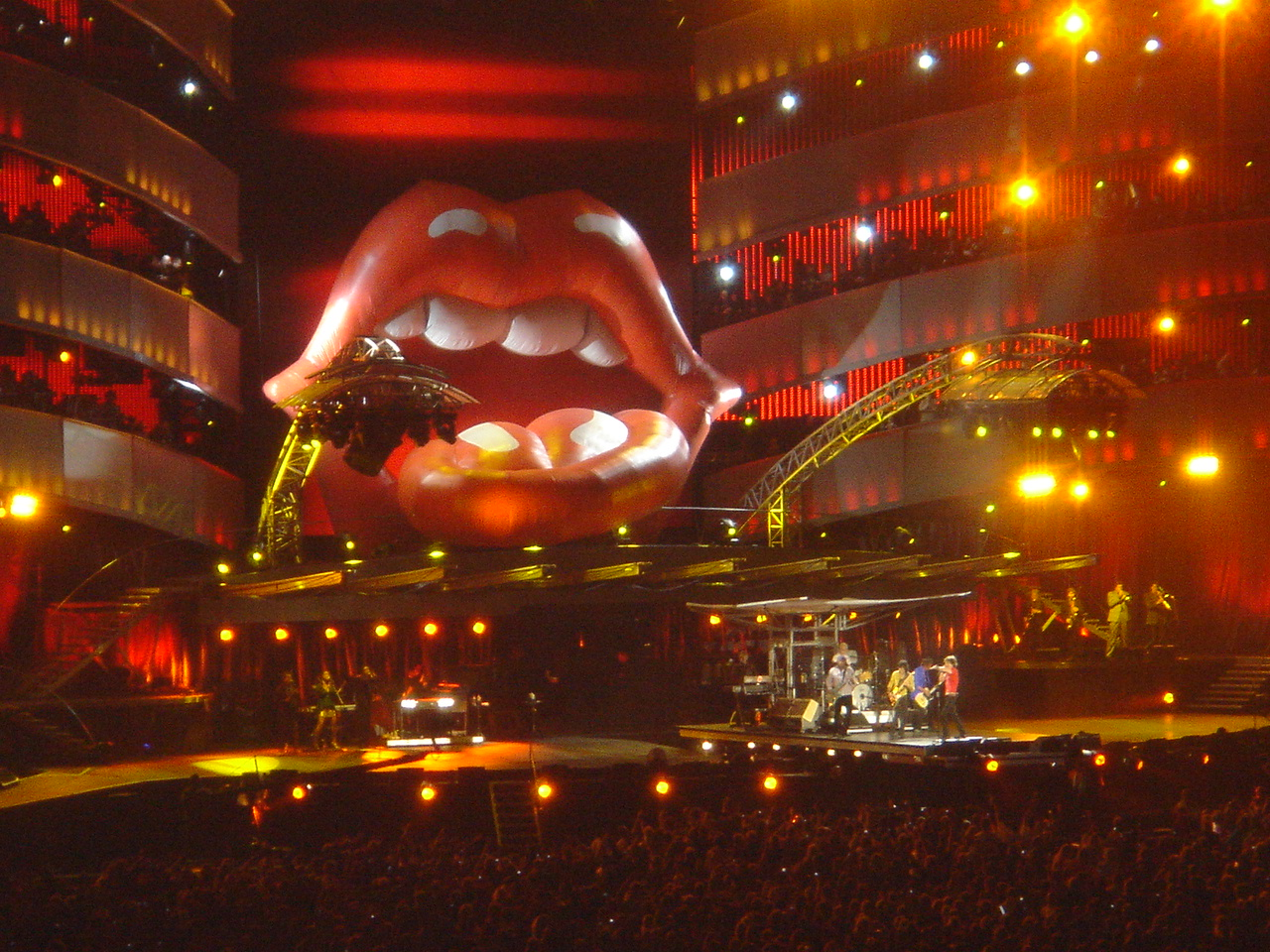
Logo used on the A Bigger Bang Tour, Twickenham Stadium, London, England

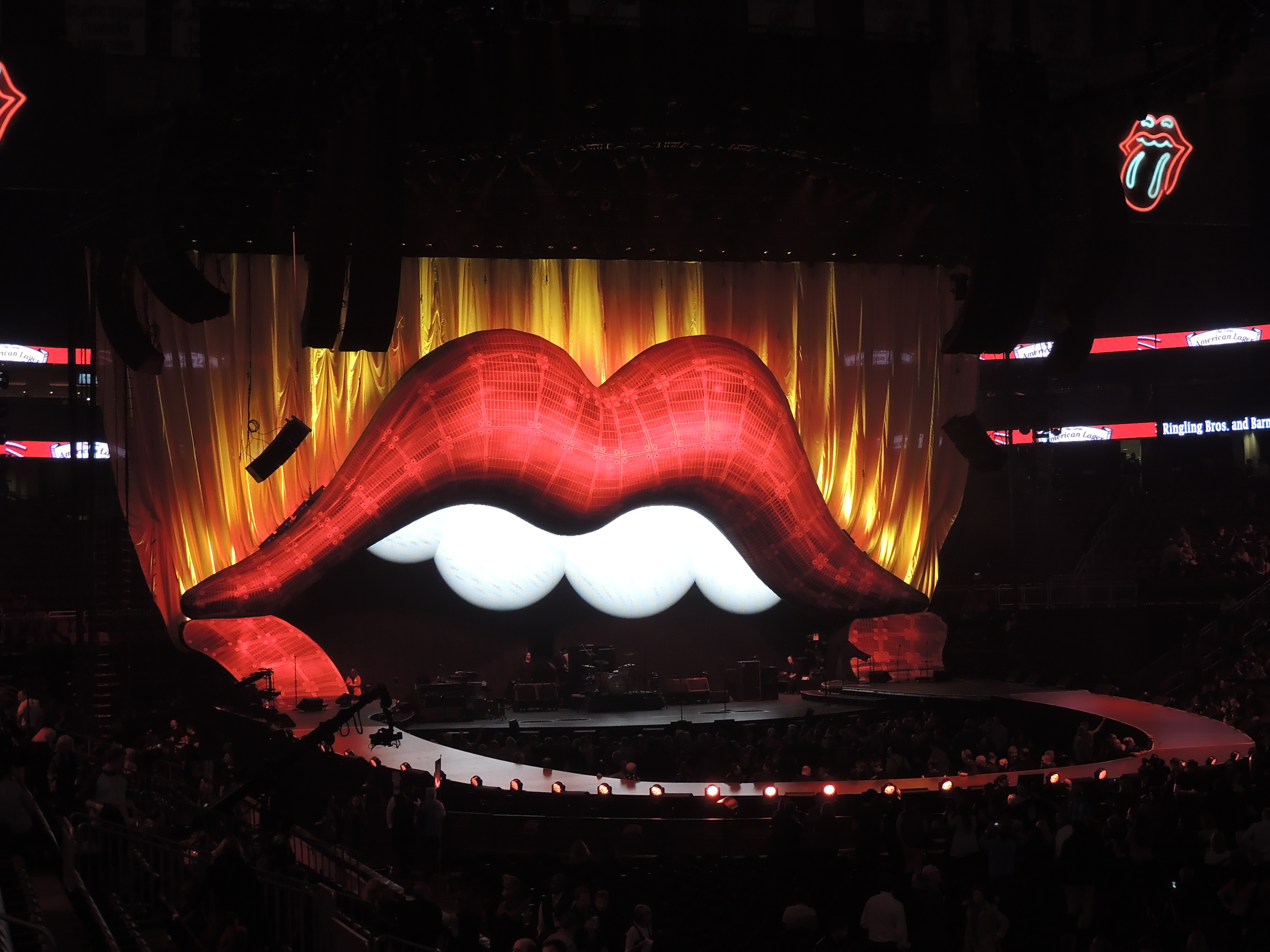
Logo used on the 50 & Counting tour, Prudential Center, Newark, New Jersey, USA

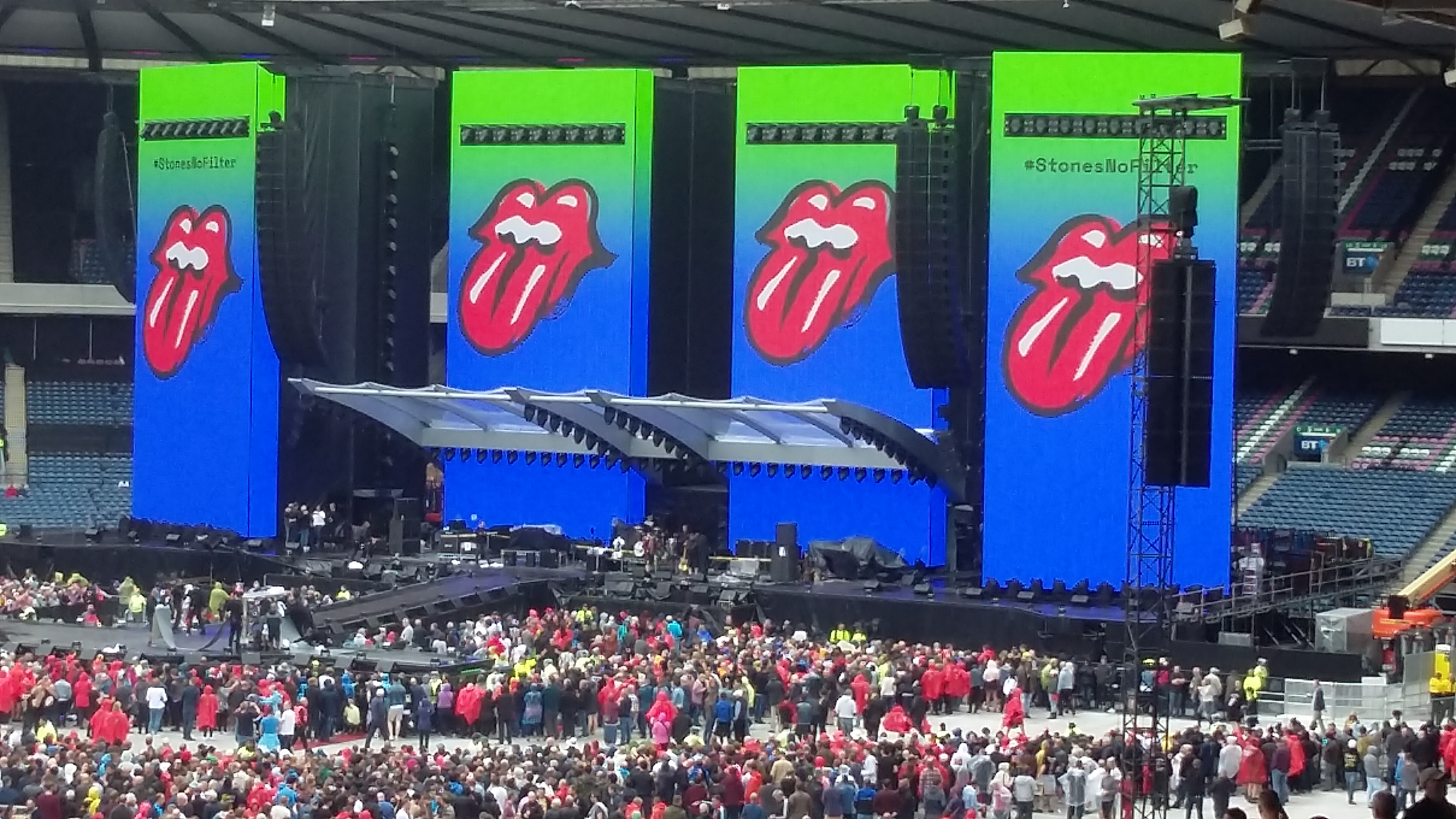
The logo used on the No Filter Tour, Murrayfield Stadium, Edinburgh, Scotland

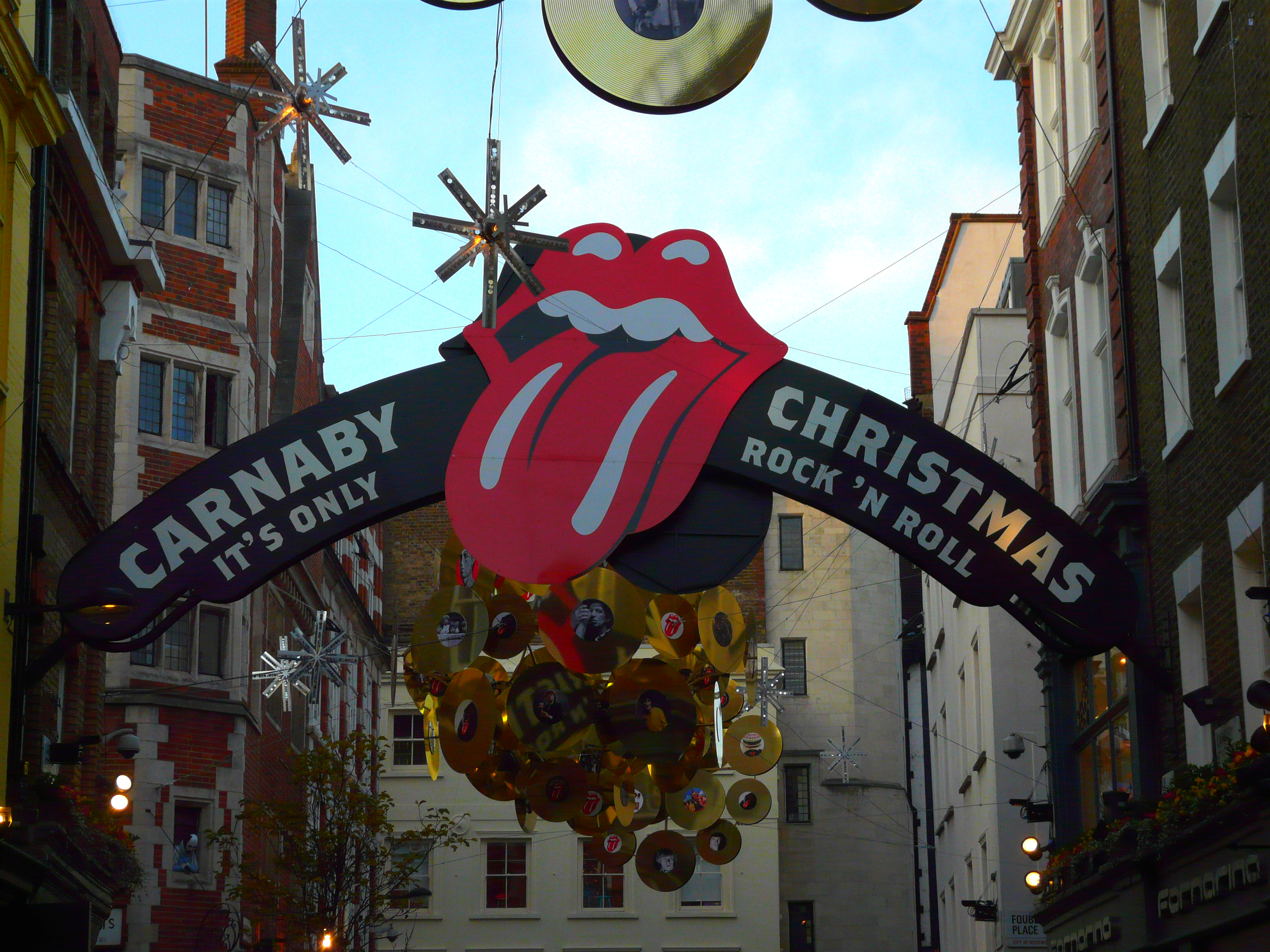
The logo displayed in Carnaby Street, London, in December 2012

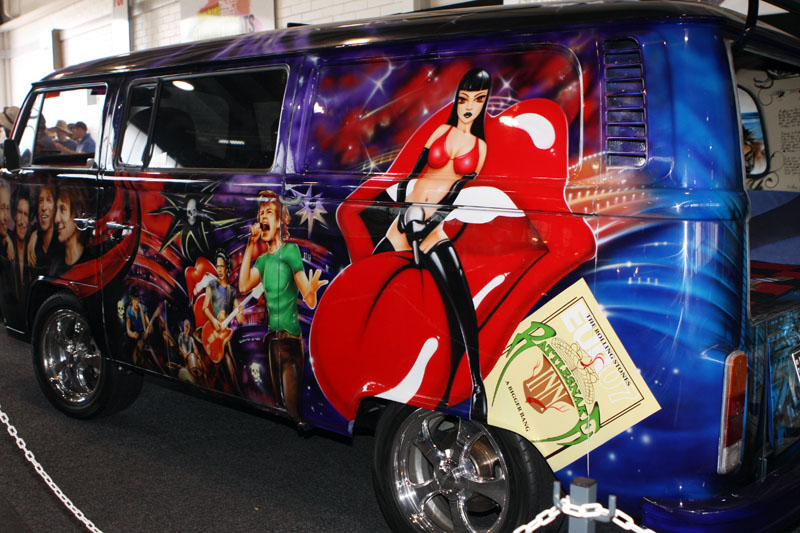
Volkswagen Type 2 van decorated with John Pasche's initial design at Summernats, Canberra, Australia

== See also ==
- Yes bubble logo, logo of the band Yes
- Flying W logo, logo of Waylon Jennings
