= John Pasche =

British art designer (born 1945)

- Born: April 24, 1945 (age 80)
- Education: BA in graphic design, Brighton College of Art; MA in Arts, Royal College of Art
- Occupations: Graphic designer; art director
- Known for: Designing the Rolling Stones' tongue and lips logo
- Notable work: The Rolling Stones logo; Tour posters and promotional material for The Rolling Stones; Logo for Van der Graaf Generator
- Website: johnpasche.com

John Pasche (born 24 April 1945) is a British graphic designer and art director. A Brighton College of Art graduate with an MA from the Royal College of Art, Pasche is best known for being the designer of the tongue and lips logo for The Rolling Stones. Aside from their logo, he has also worked with The Rolling Stones on some of their tour posters and other promotional material throughout the early to mid 1970s.

== Life and career ==
Pasche completed his BA degree in graphic design from the Brighton College of Art between 1963 and 1967. He completed his MA at the Royal College of Art in London from 1967 to 1970.

While in his last year of study in 1970, Pasche was recommended by the college to design a poster for The Rolling Stones for their 1970 European tour. That same year, he was asked by Mick Jagger to design the logo for the band. Using Jagger's mention of Kali in the singer's design brief as inspiration, Pasche designed a tongue and lips logo that evoked the Hindu goddess' common depiction with her tongue sticking out. He was paid just £50 and a further £200 in 1972. Pasche sold his copyright of the logo to the Rolling Stones via its commercial arm (Musidor BV) for £26,000 in 1984. In 2008 the original artwork of the logo was sold in the US to the Victoria and Albert Museum for $92,500, about £71,000 in 2020. The design was revised by Craig Braun while he was designing the album package and was originally reproduced on the U.S. inner sleeve and cover of Sticky Fingers album released in April, 1971. In August 2008, the design was voted the greatest band logo of all time in an online poll conducted by Gigwise. Pasche worked with the Rolling Stones from 1970 until 1974 while he was Junior Art Director at Benton & Bowles advertising agency.

Between 1974 and 1977 he founded and managed Gull Graphics. Pasche later worked with Paul McCartney, The Who, The Stranglers and Dr. Feelgood. He also created the M. C. Escher–inspired band logo of Van der Graaf Generator that first appeared on their album Godbluff. He was art director at United Artists Music Division from 1978 until 1981. From 1981 to 1991 he was Creative Director of Chrysalis Records and he was Creative Director at the South Bank Centre from 1994 until 2005.
