= Heindel =

Heindel is a surname. Notable people with the surname include:

- David Heindel, American labor union leader
- Max Heindel (1865–1919), Danish-American Christian occultist, astrologer, and mystic
- Ned D. Heindel (born 1937), American chemist
- Robert Heindel (1938–2005), American painter, illustrator, and stage designer

== See also ==
- Handel/Händel, Haendel, Heindel, Heindl, Hendel, Handl/Händl
