= Handl =

Handl or Händl is a German surname of multiple origins. Notable people with the surname include:

- Alois Handl
- Irene Handl (1901–1987), English character actress
- Jan František Händl
- Johannes Handl
- Jacobus Handl (1550–1591), late-Renaissance composer
- Klaus Händl (born 1969), Austrian actor, director, and writer
- Richard Handl

== See also ==
- Handel/Händel, Haendel, Handl/Händl, Heindel, Heindl, Hendel, Gendel
