= Handel (name) =

Handel is a surname of German origin. The word "Handel" means "trade" or "commerce" in German and as such has no plural form. The name (like the famous composer's and his father's) was originally rather spelled "Händel" (with umlaut) which as a plural noun means something like "affairs". "Händel" is also a southern German variant of "Händlein" which means "little hand". The surname was later, in English-speaking places, also used as a given name.

== Surname ==
- Bill Handel (born 1951), founder of the Center for Surrogate Parenting and an AM radio personality
- Georg Händel (1622–1697), barber-surgeon and father of the composer George Frideric Handel
- George Frideric Handel (born Georg Friedrich Händel, 1685–1759), German/British Baroque composer
- Karen Handel (born 1962), American politician
- Steven Handel (born 1945), American restoration ecologist and Rutgers University professor
- Thomas Händel (born 1953), German politician

== Given name ==
- Handel Cossham (1824–1890), British colliery owner, lay preacher and Liberal politician
- Handel Greville (1921–2014), Welsh international rugby union fly-half

== See also ==
- Handel/Händel, Haendel, Handl/Händl, Heindel, Heindl, Hendel, Gendel
