= Tommy (London Symphony Orchestra album) =

1972 album

Studio album by London Symphony Orchestra and the English Chamber Choir
- Released: October 1972
- Genre: Classical
- Length: 70:38
- Label: Ode
- Producer: Lou Reizner

Tommy is a 1972 album by the London Symphony Orchestra and English Chamber Choir, conducted and directed by David Measham, performing arrangements by Wil Malone of The Who's 1969 album Tommy with additional arrangements by James Sullivan. The project was conceived and produced by Lou Reizner, initially with Rod Stewart singing Roger Daltrey's main role. As Pete Townshend and Daltrey became more involved, Stewart's role was reduced to singing "Pinball Wizard".

The studio version of the orchestral Tommy was issued in boxed-set LP format. It featured original artwork and photography, which used a pinball as its main motif, was designed by Tom Wilkes and Craig Braun and won the Best Album Package Grammy in 1974. The art was by Richard Amsel, Robert Heindel, Jim Manos, Alex Gnidziejko, Wilson McLean, Doug Johnson, David Edward Byrd, Robert Grossman, Charles White III, Richard Harvey and Mark English.

Though it yielded no hit singles, the album fared well on Billboard's Top Pop Albums chart, debuting on 9 December 1972, peaking at #5, and remaining on the chart for 38 weeks.

On 9 December 1972, Reizner presented a concert version of the orchestrated Tommy at the Rainbow Theatre, London. There were two performances on the same evening. The concerts featured the Who, plus a guest cast, backed by the London Symphony Orchestra conducted by Measham. A second run occurred in mid-December with some different singers. In March 1973 Reizner and Measham took the concert version to Australia, performing with Keith Moon as Uncle Ernie, and a cast of Australian singers and musicians.

== Track list ==
All tracks are written by Pete Townshend, except where noted.

Side One
No.	Title	Featured performer(s)	Length
1.	"Overture"	The Chamber Choir, Pete Townshend, London Symphony Orchestra
2.	"It's a Boy"	The Chamber Choir, Sandy Denny
3.	"1921"	Graham Bell, Maggie Bell, The Chamber Choir, Roger Daltrey, Steve Winwood
4.	"Amazing Journey"	Chamber Choir, Pete Townshend
5.	"Sparks"	The Chamber Choir
6.	"Eyesight to the Blind" (Sonny Boy Williamson II)	The Chamber Choir, Richie Havens
7.	"Christmas"	Pete Townshend, London Symphony Orchestra, The Chamber Choir, Roger Daltrey, Steve Winwood

Side Two
No.	Title	Featured performer(s)	Length
1.	"Cousin Kevin" (John Entwistle)	The Chamber Choir, John Entwistle
2.	"The Acid Queen"	The Chamber Choir, Merry Clayton
3.	"Underture"	The Chamber Choir
4.	"Do You Think It's Alright?"	Maggie Bell, The Chamber Choir, Steve Winwood
5.	"Fiddle About" (John Entwistle)	The Chamber Choir, Ringo Starr
6.	"Pinball Wizard"	The Chamber Choir, Rod Stewart

Side Three
No.	Title	Featured performer(s)	Length
1.	"There's a Doctor I've Found"	The Chamber Choir, Steve Winwood
2.	"Go to the Mirror Boy"	Richard Harris (narration), The Chamber Choir, Roger Daltrey, Steve Winwood, Wil Malone
3.	"Tommy Can You Hear Me?"	Maggie Bell, The Chamber Choir
4.	"Smash the Mirror"	Maggie Bell, The Chamber Choir
5.	"I'm Free"	The Chamber Choir, Roger Daltrey
6.	"Miracle Cure"	The Chamber Choir
7.	"Sensation"	The Chamber Choir, Roger Daltrey

Side Four
No.	Title	Featured performer(s)	Length
1.	"Sally Simpson"	The Chamber Choir, Pete Townshend
2.	"Welcome"	The Chamber Choir, Roger Daltrey
3.	"Tommy's Holiday Camp" (Keith Moon)	The Chamber Choir, Ringo Starr
4.	"We're Not Gonna Take It"	The Chamber Choir, Roger Daltrey
5.	"See Me, Feel Me" (Finale from "We're Not Gonna Take It")	The Chamber Choir, Roger Daltrey

== Guest soloists in order of appearance ==
- Narrator: Pete Townshend
- Nurse: Sandy Denny
- Lover: Graham Bell
- Father: Steve Winwood
- Mother: Maggie Bell
- Hawker: Richie Havens
- Acid Queen: Merry Clayton
- Tommy: Roger Daltrey
- Cousin Kevin: John Entwistle
- Uncle Ernie: Ringo Starr
- Local Lad: Rod Stewart
- Doctor: Richard Harris

== Charts ==
Chart (1972/73)	Position
Australia (Kent Music Report)	4
United States (Billboard's Top Pop Albums)	5
