= Hendel =

Hendel is a surname, and may refer to:

- Andy Hendel (born 1961), American footballer
- Charles W. Hendel (1890–1982), American Hume scholar
- Frank B. Hendel (1892–1973), American politician from New York
- Friedrich Georg Hendel (1874–1936), Austrian high school director and entomologist
- Geerd Hendel (1903–1998), German naval architect
- Henriette Hendel-Schütz (1772–1849), German actress
- Neal Hendel (born 1952), Israeli judge
- Nechama Hendel (1936–1998), Israeli singer
- Paolo Hendel (born 1952), Italian actor
- Rudolf Hendel (1947–2023), German judoka
- Yehudit Hendel (1921–2014), Israeli author
- Yoaz Hendel (born 1975), Israeli military historian, journalist and politician
- Zvi Hendel (born 1949), Israeli politician

== See also ==
- Handel/Händel, Haendel, Handl/Händl, Heindel, Heindl, Hendel, Gendel
