= The Rolling Stones UK Tour 1971 =

1971 concert tour by the Rolling Stones

- Continental tour by The Rolling Stones
- Location: Europe
- Start date: 4 March 1971
- End date: 26 March 1971
- Legs: 1
- No. of shows: 18

The Rolling Stones concert chronology
- European Tour 1970; UK Tour 1971; American Tour 1972

The Rolling Stones' 1971 UK Tour was a brief concert tour of England and Scotland that took place over three weeks in March 1971.

== History ==
The Stones had not staged a tour proper in their homeland since autumn 1966. Now they were going out after having announced on the day of their first show that they were becoming tax exiles and decamping to the South of France, which they did shortly after finishing the tour. As a result, this tour was also called the Good-Bye Britain Tour or formulations thereof.

The tour was not lengthy, but audience numbers were enlarged by playing two shows on almost every night. Although Sticky Fingers was still not released, the group expanded the number of selections from it played compared with the previous Fall's European Tour; "Wild Horses" and "Bitch" were among those added. Nicky Hopkins took over from Ian Stewart the role of stage keyboardist.

The Brighton, Liverpool, Leeds and London performances were recorded with the Rolling Stones mobile studio by the Rolling Stones crew. Almost the entire Leeds show was later broadcast in mono by the BBC. A stereo version of the Chuck Berry cover "Let It Rock" from the same concert was officially released on the Spanish edition of Sticky Fingers in 1971. A recording of "Let It Rock" from the Leeds concert appeared on the "Brown Sugar" maxi single in the UK.

Press opportunities focused on the usual banter with lead singer Mick Jagger:

Reporter: "Many remark on the tendency of Mick Jagger to be as feminine as masculine. Would you like to be a woman?"
Jagger: "If God wants me to become a woman, then a woman I will become."

The Groundhogs were the supporting act for the shows.

== Bootlegs and official releases ==
The Leeds Concert has been released unofficially numerous times, making it one of the most well-known bootleg recordings of the Rolling Stones to date, most famously with the title of Get Your Leeds Lungs Out! (a reference to the Rolling Stones official live record Get Yer Ya-Ya's Out! made by Mick Jagger during that concert, just before beginning the performance of "Honky Tonk Women"). All of these bootleg recordings however omitted the concert's first two songs, "Jumpin' Jack Flash" and "Live with Me", and most of them were released in mono. The 2015 re-release of the album Sticky Fingers has seen an inclusion of the Leeds performance in stereo, remastered and complete (comprehending the two missed tracks, thus making a total of 13 songs) under the name of Get Yer Leeds Lungs Out, as a release exclusively attached to the super deluxe edition.

The Marquee Club and Roundhouse Gigs have also surfaced on various bootleg records. Whilst the bonus material from the 2015 re-release of Sticky Fingers contains five tracks from the performance at the Roundhouse (as well as studio outtakes from the album). Subsequently the Marquee Club has been released separately on 19 June 2015 in CD and vinyl format including a BD or DVD of the performance.

== Personnel ==
=== The Rolling Stones ===
- Mick Jagger – lead vocals, harmonica
- Keith Richards – guitar, backing vocals
- Mick Taylor – guitar
- Bill Wyman – bass
- Charlie Watts – drums

=== Additional musicians ===
- Nicky Hopkins – piano
- Bobby Keys – saxophone
- Jim Price – trumpet

== Tour set list ==
Set List:

1. Live With Me
2. Dead Flowers
3. I Got The Blues
4. Let It Rock
5. Midnight Rambler
6. (I Can't Get No) Satisfaction
7. Bitch
8. Brown Sugar

Encore:

1. I Got The Blues (Take 1)
2. I Got The Blues (Take 2)
3. Bitch (Take 1)
4. Bitch (Take 2)

For the rest of the tour some songs were dropped, at certain shows. "Wild Horses" was likely played at the 1st Newcastle show and definitely at the 2nd Newcastle show. It was likely played at other shows as well. Sympathy For The Devil may have been played as the first encore, with Let It Rock as the second encore, at the 2nd Newcastle show. It may have been played at other shows. Through interviews with Mick Jagger and Bobby Keys it appears the band attempted Can't You Hear Me Knocking at least once early in the tour.

== Tour dates ==
| Date | City | Country | Venue | Opening act(s) |
|---|---|---|---|---|
| 4 March 1971 (2 shows) | Newcastle upon Tyne | England | Newcastle City Hall | The Groundhogs |
| 5 March 1971 (2 shows) | Manchester | England | Free Trade Hall | The Groundhogs |
| 6 March 1971 (2 shows) | Coventry | England | Criterion Theatre | The Groundhogs |
| 8 March 1971 (2 shows) | Glasgow | Scotland | Green's Playhouse | The Groundhogs |
| 9 March 1971 (2 shows) | Bristol | England | Colston Hall | The Groundhogs |
| 10 March 1971 (2 shows) | Brighton | England | Regent Cinema | The Groundhogs |
| 12 March 1971 (2 shows) | Liverpool | England | Liverpool Empire Theatre | The Groundhogs |
| 13 March 1971 | Leeds | England | University of Leeds Refectory | The Groundhogs |
| 14 March 1971 (2 shows) | London | England | Roundhouse | The Groundhogs |
| 26 March 1971 (Note: The concert on 26 March 1971 at the Marquee Club was the Rolling Stones final concert in England in 1971. It was not officially part of the tour, but the Melody Maker said that it was performed "before a small but elite audience that included Eric Clapton, Jimmy Page, Ric Grech, and Andrew Oldham". It was also the first time that the tongue and lips logo was ever used, when it appeared on VIP passes to the concert.) | London | England | Marquee Club | The Groundhogs |
