= Craig Braun =

American artist (born 1939)

- Born: 1939 (age 86–87); Chicago, U.S.
- Occupations: Actor; graphic designer
- Years active: 1964–present
- Known for: Rolling Stones logo
- Children: 3, including Nicholas Braun

Craig Braun (born June 1, 1939) is an American actor and former graphic designer. Famous for his album covers with Andy Warhol and Tom Wilkes, he and Wilkes won a Grammy in 1974 for Tommy, an award Braun had been nominated for twice previously. His first nomination was with Warhol for the Sticky Fingers design that included Braun's contributions to the Rolling Stones' tongue and lips logo. He also designed the logo for the Carpenters. Braun is said to have transformed the medium of album covers from two-dimensional works to creative, interactive experiences during the golden age of vinyl.

== Early and personal life ==
Craig Braun was born in 1939 to a working-class family in Chicago. He became friends with Marshall Chess as children in Chicago; Chess became a record executive and the two would later work together. Braun went to university. Braun, who socialized with artists and rock and roll musicians in his career, became addicted to cocaine, something he would recover from after being indicted for tax evasion in 1974, leading his work to dry up and giving a friend the chance to take him to an AA meeting in Los Angeles. At the height of his career, he had a rare Porsche collection and a lavish house in Manhattan that then-girlfriend Diane von Fürstenberg described as "the epitome of cool".

In 2017 he hosted the Alex Awards, and in 2018 the Making Vinyl Packaging Awards, music industry awards for album packaging.

His sons include Timothy, Nicholas, and Christopher Deyo. He sent Tim to the Malcolm Gordon School boys' boarding school. Tim Braun was a producer of Good Morning America and later founded Braun Production; Nicholas appeared on Good Morning America as a child and is an Emmy-nominated actor (for Succession in 2020). Braun introduced Nick to acting and coached him through the Meisner technique "as though it was a sport". Deyo is an indie musician, and has created R&B music with Nicholas under the stage name BRAUN.

== Design ==
=== 1964–1971: Sound Packaging Corporation, Craig Braun Inc. ===
Braun began his design career in 1964, working as a die cutter and printer. He invented the "gimmick" of using stickers on album cover shrink wrap to promote them, and started a merchandising company for promotions in record stores. He moved into album cover design shortly afterwards, despite having no design experience, when he was approached by London Records USA to make an album cover for American distribution. He learned album design by going to large stores and looking at as many album covers as possible, which also led him to realize that he had an opportunity to take the design format and do something out-of-the-ordinary with it. He started a new company, Album Graphics, in Chicago, and then a design studio on the West Coast. When early partnerships did not work out, he started Sound Packaging Division (Sound Packaging Corporation). The company did both designs and the construction of record packages; Braun gifted the designs to the bands in return for being hired to create them, which paid much better.

He designed his first major cover when MGM Records approached him to assist Andy Warhol with the removable banana peel featured on the cover of The Velvet Underground & Nico; with his adhesive experience, Braun developed the materials used to create the cover. Warhol then became something of a mentor to Braun in the late 1960s. In 1970, he created the moving parts of the Zacron-designed packaging for Led Zeppelin III.

In 1970 and 1971, Braun worked with Warhol to create the cover art for the Rolling Stones' album Sticky Fingers. When John Pasche faxed his design for the band's tongue and lips logo to Braun for the back cover, it had become grainy and had no color; Braun "slightly modified" the design to make it printworthy. He elongated the logo and added highlights, which is the version officially used. He had been told by Chess, the album's record producer, that Pasche was designing a logo for Mick Jagger, and demanded to use it on the cover design; his haste was the cause of the version he received being low-quality. In making the design printable, Braun took inspiration from an illustration by Alan Aldridge of a girl licking an ice pop with a "huge tongue", which was representing the Beatles' "Day Tripper" in The Beatles Illustrated Lyrics; he then worked with illustrator Walter Velez to combine the designs. Craig Braun, Inc. had a merchandise imprint, Rockreations, which licensed the logo for three years.

Braun had originally been against the zipper design, thinking it could damage the record inside and having several other ideas in mind; one of the ideas was to wrap the album in Bambú brand rolling paper, which he was using to roll a joint after photographing a different idea. Though Chess liked the Bambu idea, they agreed to stick with the zipper, and Braun pitched the Bambu cover to Lou Adler as a Cheech & Chong album cover idea. To prevent record damage by the zipper, Braun suggested adding another image behind, and proposed using an underwear shot of the same model wearing the jeans on the cover to Warhol; the concept was used, but Braun does not think Warhol used the same model. Braun said in 2021 that the jeans model was Corey Grant Tippin, and that he is 90% sure the underwear model was Glenn O'Brien. When he was told the records were still being damaged due to shipping stacked, he had them produced with the zipper pulled down, which he felt also improved the design. The cover has been named one of the best album covers of all time, including by Billboard. Braun and Warhol were nominated for a Grammy for Best Recording Package for the album in 1972; Braun was incredulous when it did not win, and went to the bathroom to take drugs to console himself.

Carpenters logo

At the same time as he was working on Sticky Fingers, Braun was also designing the album packaging for Grand Funk Railroad's E Pluribus Funk, which he hired an actual coin stamper to make, and the Carpenters' third album, Carpenters. Capitol Records' VP for marketing said that the E Pluribus Funk design promotion was the "most total and comprehensive marketing campaign [Capitol had] ever undertaken". Braun's design for Carpenters stylized the duo's name and album title, and Richard Carpenter decided to use it as their logo going forward. Braun had also designed a crate-like stand to display the Carpenters record by cash registers, though A&M Records did not go with it.

=== 1972–1974: Wilkes & Braun ===
Braun began working with Tom Wilkes as Wilkes & Braun in 1972, changing the direction of his corporations to offer more services to music companies, specifically in marketing. He scaled back his operations in New York to work more in Los Angeles, telling Billboard that it was the new center of the recording industry. The new company took on Braun's existing clients and record commitments, with Braun saying at the time that the merger would not mean they would take on more or bigger clients, instead planning to offer a bespoke service. Rockreations began producing non-musician celebrity merchandise, while Wilkes & Braun also took on graphic design for the Robert Altman film The Long Goodbye. Wilkes & Braun were nominated for the Best Recording Package Grammy in 1973 for School's Out, which opened out into a school desk and was similar in cover art to the 1971 Hotlegs record Thinks: School Stinks. Braun's original packaging for School's Out included a pair of paper underwear, which had to be recalled for being a fire hazard.

With Wilkes, Braun won the Best Recording Package Grammy in 1974 for the London Symphony Orchestra version of Tommy, which Braun has said is his "favorite package of all." His son remembers that there was some mix-up at the award ceremony, and so the trophy Braun received was engraved for Carly Simon's "You're So Vain".

He had been friends with Jimi Hendrix, and designed the covers of the posthumous Hendrix albums Crash Landing and Midnight Lightning, which he finds evocative despite the traditional art medium.

Shortly after his Grammy win, Braun was indicted for tax evasion. Though he did not go to jail, it effectively ended his career for several years.

=== 1981–2001: Music videos and corporate roles ===
In 1981, Braun and director Albert Fisher created Fisher/Braun Communications as a music video concept company, which also provided recording and presentation services. By 1984, he owned video company Braun Communications, Inc., which was still operational as Craig Braun, Inc. again, and a member of the American Federation of Television and Radio Artists, in 1989.

When the music industry became corporate in the 1980s, Braun was hired to head the marketing department of Warner-Elektra-Atlantic. Though he did contribute to promotion and advertising, they wanted him more to design special edition CDs; Braun said he sees this era as a separate career from when he had his own company and could focus on design and having fun. In the early 1990s, he was working as a branch sales manager for Sony Music Distribution.

== Acting ==
After taking early retirement in 2001 from Warner Music Group, leaving as Creative and Marketing Director, Braun became an actor and lifetime member of The Actors Studio, working in stage, film and television. He is based in Los Angeles.

He played literary agent Nelson in the 2021 film Erotic Fire of the Unattainable, a semi-improvisational story about an older woman struggling with love and her writing career.
