= Melissa Haendel =

American bioinformaticist

Melissa Anne Haendel
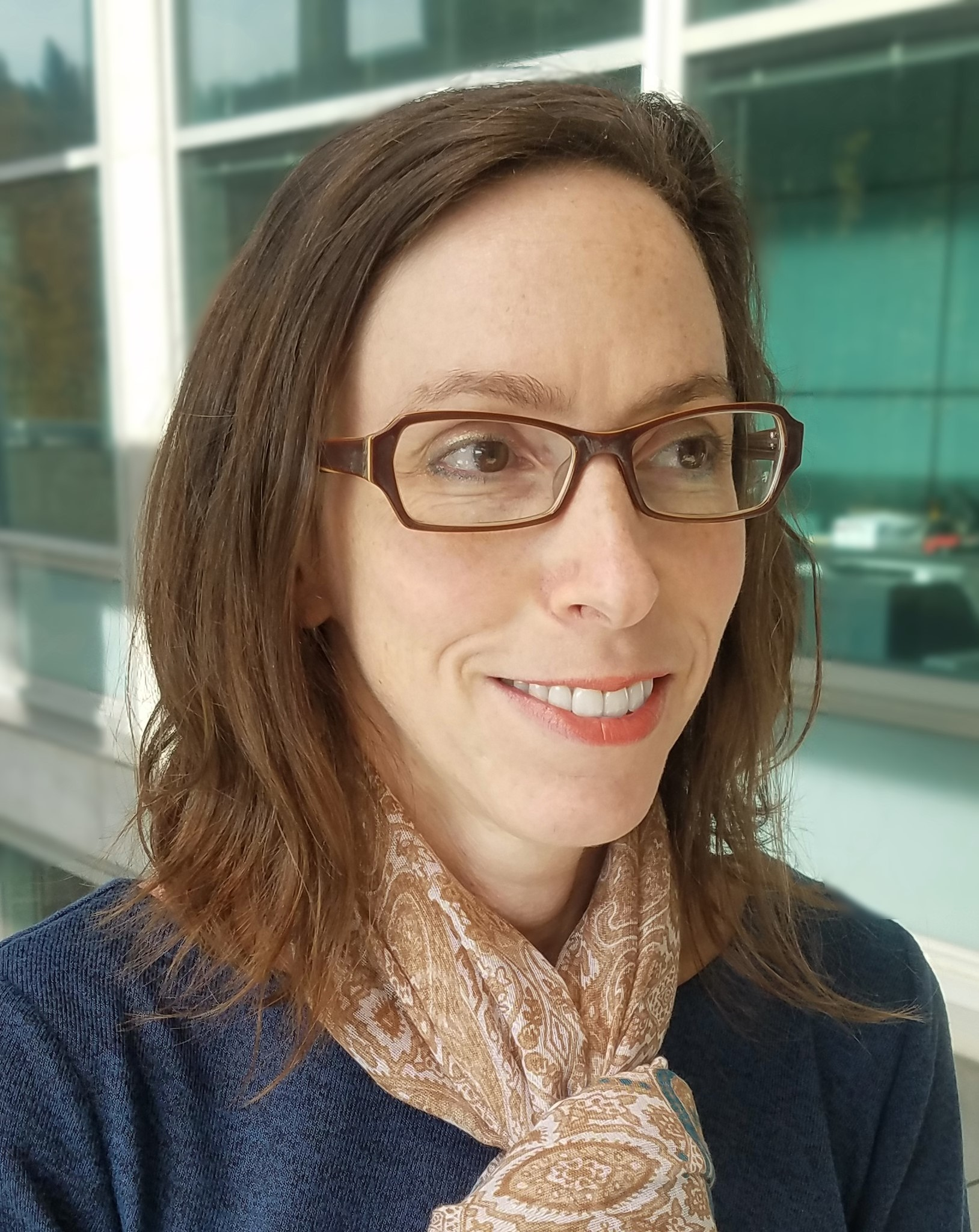
- Haendel in 2020
- Education: Reed College; University of Wisconsin–Madison
- Known for: Bioinformatics
- Scientific career
- Workplaces: Anschutz Medical Campus; Oregon Health & Science University; Oregon State University
- Thesis: Identification and characterization of the novel gene, axotrophin, using an in vitro gene trap preselection method (1999)

Melissa Anne Haendel is an American bioinformaticist who is the Sarah Graham Kenan Distinguished Professor at the UNC School of Medicine. She is also the Director of Precision Health & Translational Informatics, deputy director of Computational Science at The North Carolina Translational and Clinical Sciences Institute. She serves as Director of the Center for Data to Health (CD2H). Her research makes use of data to improve the discovery and diagnosis of diseases. During the COVID-19 pandemic, Haendel joined with the National Institutes of Health to launch the National COVID Cohort Collaborative (N3C), which looks to identify the risk factors that can predict severity of disease outcome and help to identify treatments.

== Early life and education ==
Haendel earned her undergraduate degree in chemistry at Reed College. Her undergraduate dissertation looked at designing pharmaceuticals using molecular electrostatic potentials (MEPs) to construct quantitative structure-activity relationships. She moved to the University of Wisconsin–Madison for her graduate studies, where she used in vitro gene trapping to study the gene axotrophin. Her early career focussed on genetics and molecular biology. In 2000 she moved to the University of Oregon as a postdoctoral researcher studying the role of thyroid hormones in the neural development of zebrafish.

== Research and career ==
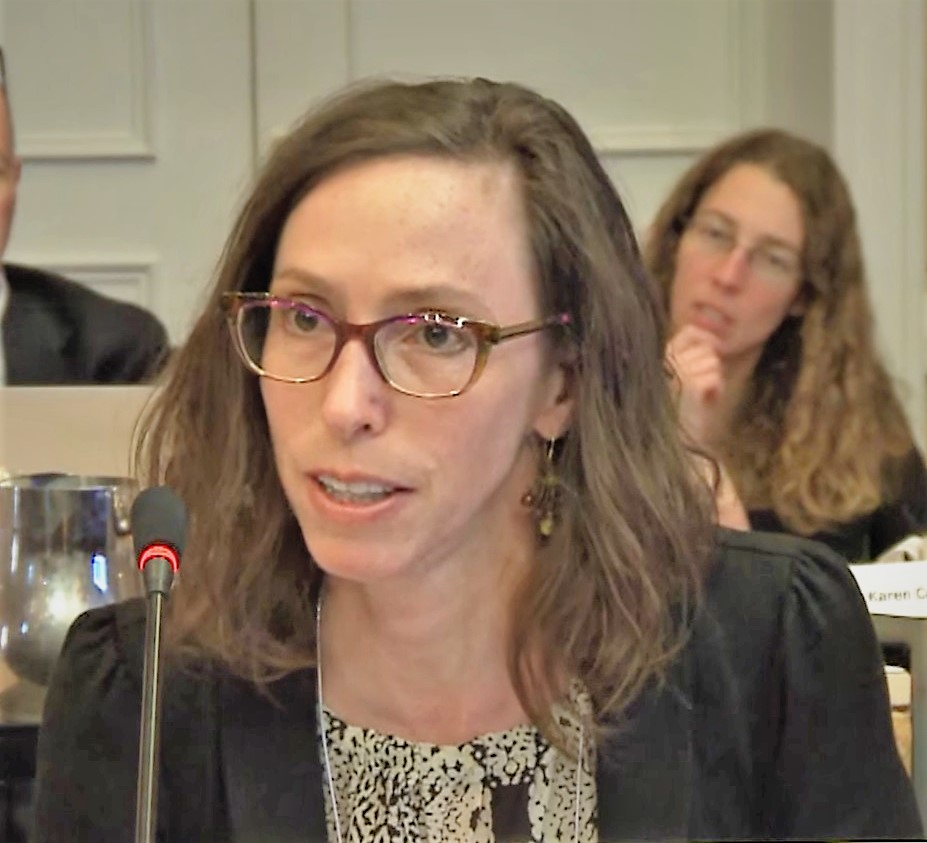
Haendel speaks at the National Human Genome Research Institute in 2016

Haendel started working in healthcare informatics in 2004. She switched the focus of her research from neuroscience and the biology of zebrafish to the development of resources for the Oregon Health & Science University library. She was promoted to associate professor of Medical Informatics in 2015.

Haendel's research considers ontology development, biocuration and data harmonization. Biocuration assembles information from patient records, research outputs and medical literature to create a quality-controlled, computable format. She was previously the Director of Translational Data Science at the Linus Pauling Institute. She previously held the position of Chief Research Informatics Officer at the University of Colorado Anschutz Medical Campus.

Haendel believes that a globally consistent set of criteria, more comprehensive data collection, sharing and analysis will help to diagnose rare diseases. Rare diseases are thought to impact 10% of the global population, meaning that there are considerable numbers of patients who are underserved by their healthcare systems. In 2019, Haendel and the CD2H were awarded almost $9 million to make data related to cancer research more centralised and organised. The Center for Cancer Data Harmonization makes use of a cloud-based portal to share data between physicians and cancer researchers across the country.

During the COVID-19 pandemic, the United States had no standardised means to collect and share clinical data. Haendel was concerned that the number of deaths and infections were not being accurately counted, and that this might compromise safe reopening. In June 2020, Haendel formed the National COVID Cohort Collaborative (N3C), which collates and analyses the medical record data of people with coronavirus disease. The N3C looks to identify the risk factors that can predict severity of coronavirus disease and help to identify potential treatments. The collaborative has work streams in data partnership, phenotypes, collaborative analytics, data harmonisation and data synthesis.

== Selected publications ==
- Mungall, Christopher J; Torniai, Carlo; Gkoutos, Georgios V; Lewis, Suzanna E; Haendel, Melissa A (2012). "Uberon, an integrative multi-species anatomy ontology". Genome Biology. 13 (1): R5. doi:10.1186/gb-2012-13-1-r5. ISSN 1465-6906. PMC 3334586. PMID 22293552. S2CID 15453742.
- Day-Richter, J.; Harris, M. A.; Haendel, M.; Lewis, S. (2007-06-01). "OBO-Edit an ontology editor for biologists". Bioinformatics. 23 (16): 2198–2200. doi:10.1093/bioinformatics/btm112. ISSN 1367-4803. PMID 17545183.
- Shimoyama, Mary; Dwinell, Melinda; Jacob, Howard (2009-08-05). "Multiple Ontologies for Integrating Complex Phenotype Datasets". Nature Precedings. doi:10.1038/npre.2009.3554 (inactive 18 July 2025). ISSN 1756-0357.
