= No Filter Tour =

2017–21 concert tour by the Rolling Stones

- Tour by The Rolling Stones
- Promotional poster for the tour
- Location: Europe; North America
- Associated album: Blue & Lonesome
- Start date: 9 September 2017
- End date: 23 November 2021
- Legs: 4
- No. of shows: 58
- Attendance: 2,867,799
- Box office: $546.5 million

The Rolling Stones concert chronology
- América Latina Olé (2016); No Filter Tour (2017–2021); Sixty (2022)

The No Filter Tour was a European/North American concert tour by the Rolling Stones which began on 9 September 2017 in Hamburg, Germany. The tour was scheduled to conclude in 2020 but had to be postponed due to the COVID-19 pandemic. The tour resumed in September 2021. A few weeks before the tour resumed, the Stones announced that drummer Charlie Watts had undergone an unspecified medical procedure and that he would likely be unable to join the tour due to a lengthy recovery. Watts ultimately died on 24 August 2021. The band announced on 5 August that longtime Stones associate Steve Jordan would fill in as drummer for the 2021 dates.

== Overview ==
The No Filter Tour was announced on 9 May 2017, with fourteen shows in twelve different venues across Europe in September and October of the same year. On 26 February 2018, fourteen new dates were added throughout Europe and the UK. The Stones logo was redesigned for the European leg by French designer Millinsky. With an overall attendance of 1,506,259 fans grossing $237.8 million, the tour was one of the most commercially successful concert tours of 2017 and 2018. The North American leg of the tour was officially announced on 19 November 2018 and was set to play 17 shows across the United States and one in Canada, beginning on 20 April 2019 in Miami, Florida.

On 30 March 2019, it was announced that Mick Jagger would be receiving treatment for an unspecific medical condition, which forced the Stones to postpone the 17-date North American leg of the tour. The procedure took place in April 2019 at a New York City hospital. As a result, the band's headline performance at the New Orleans Jazz Festival had to be cancelled. It was initially announced that Fleetwood Mac would headline in place of the Stones, but they were also forced to cancel due to Stevie Nicks contracting influenza. The slot was filled by Widespread Panic.

On 4 April 2019, it was announced that Jagger's procedure was successful. On 16 May, the Rolling Stones announced that No Filter Tour would resume on 21 June with the 17 postponed dates rescheduled up to the end of August.

On 6 February 2020, fifteen additional North American dates were announced.

On 17 March 2020, the fifteen North American dates for May–July 2020 were postponed due to the coronavirus pandemic. The tour was rescheduled and resumed in September 2021, without Charlie Watts who had to undergo a medical procedure and died before the final leg of the tour. The band confirmed on 26 August that the tour will continue as planned. Steve Jordan took his place in the lineup for the remainder of the tour.

== Stage design ==
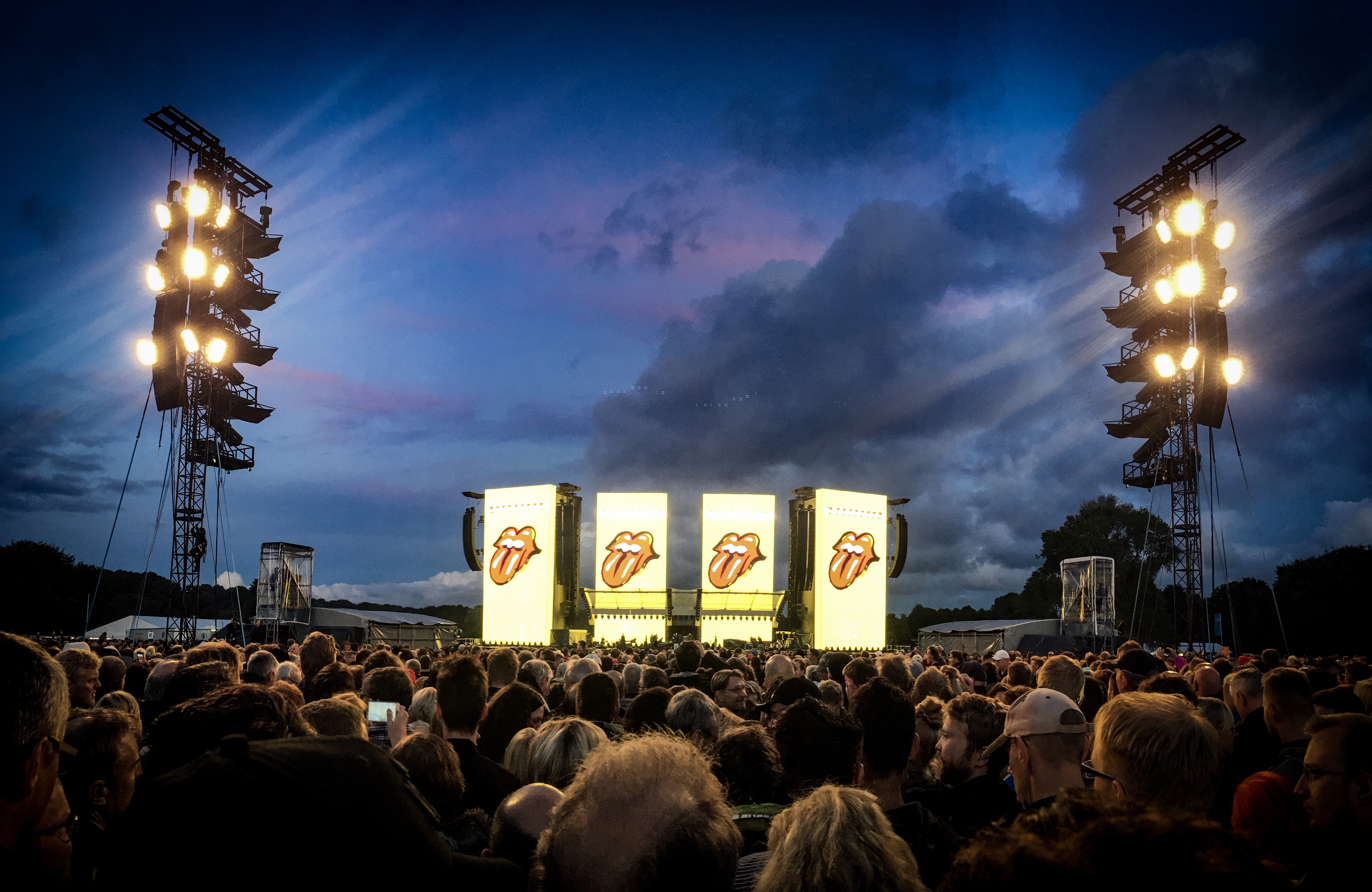
Stage at Hamburg Stadtpark shortly before the concert.

The stage was designed by Stufish Entertainment Architects and built by Stageco and WIcreations. The stage consists of four LED video columns measuring 22 metres (72 ft) tall and 11 metres (36 ft) wide. Two metres (6.6 ft) below the top of the LED screens is an 8-metre (26 ft) wide gap to accommodate a row of nine moving spotlights with a transparent rain cover. A transparent roof structure covers the main stage to offer protection from weather. The main stage measures 60 metres (200 ft) wide. In 2017 and 2018, there was a 28-metre-long (92-foot) T-shaped catwalk and B-stage. For the 2019 leg of the tour, the B-stage was changed to a round design and the far ends of the main stage were extended into the crowd.

== Set list ==
These setlists were performed at the 19 October 2017 concert held at the U Arena, Nanterre, the 22 May 2018 concert at London Stadium, London, and at the 5 August 2019 concert at MetLife Stadium, East Rutherford. These do not represent all shows throughout the tour.

=== 2017 ===
1. "Sympathy for the Devil"
2. "It's Only Rock 'n Roll (But I Like It)"
3. "Tumbling Dice"
4. "Just Your Fool"
5. "Ride 'Em On Down"
6. "Under My Thumb"
7. "Let's Spend the Night Together"
8. "You Can't Always Get What You Want"
9. "Paint It Black"
10. "Honky Tonk Women"
11. "Happy"
12. "Slipping Away"
13. "Miss You"
14. "Midnight Rambler"
15. "Street Fighting Man"
16. "Start Me Up"
17. "Brown Sugar"
18. "Jumpin' Jack Flash"
19. "Gimme Shelter"
20. "(I Can't Get No) Satisfaction"

=== 2018 ===
1. "Street Fighting Man"
2. "It's Only Rock 'n Roll (But I Like It)"
3. "Tumbling Dice"
4. "Paint It Black"
5. "Ride 'Em On Down"
6. "Under My Thumb"
7. "Fool To Cry"
8. "You Can't Always Get What You Want"
9. "Honky Tonk Women"
10. "Before They Make Me Run"
11. "Slipping Away"
12. "Sympathy for the Devil"
13. "Miss You"
14. "Midnight Rambler"
15. "Start Me Up"
16. "Jumpin' Jack Flash"
17. "Brown Sugar"
18. "Gimme Shelter"
19. "(I Can't Get No) Satisfaction"

=== 2019 ===
1. "Jumpin' Jack Flash"
2. "You Got Me Rocking"
3. "Tumbling Dice"
4. "Harlem Shuffle"
5. "Monkey Man"
6. "You Can't Always Get What You Want"
7. "Let It Bleed" (B-stage acoustic)
8. "Dead Flowers" (B-stage acoustic)
9. "Sympathy for the Devil"
10. "Honky Tonk Women"
11. "You Got the Silver"
12. "Before They Make Me Run"
13. "Miss You"
14. "Midnight Rambler"
15. "Paint It Black"
16. "Start Me Up"
17. "Brown Sugar"
18. "Gimme Shelter"
19. "(I Can't Get No) Satisfaction"

== Tour dates ==
List of 2017 concerts
Date (2017)	City	Country	Venue	Opening act(s)	Attendance	Gross
9 September	Hamburg	Germany	Hamburg Stadtpark	Kaleo	81,193 / 81,193	$11,954,300
12 September	Munich	Germany	Olympiastadion	Kaleo	72,637 / 72,637	$11,792,289
16 September	Spielberg	Austria	Red Bull Ring	Kaleo; John Lee Hooker Jr.	95,004 / 95,004	$11,202,349
20 September	Zürich	Switzerland	Letzigrund	The Struts	48,963 / 48,963	$10,304,275
23 September	Lucca	Italy	Mura Storiche	The Struts	55,604 / 55,604	$7,618,277
27 September	Barcelona	Spain	Estadi Olímpic Lluís Companys	Los Zigarros	58,622 / 58,622	$8,769,703
30 September	Amsterdam	Netherlands	Amsterdam Arena	De Staat	54,791 / 54,791	$8,762,079
3 October	Copenhagen	Denmark	Telia Parken	Rival Sons	47,002 / 47,002	$8,510,736
9 October	Düsseldorf	Germany	Esprit Arena	Rival Sons	43,295 / 43,295	$8,487,199
12 October	Stockholm	Sweden	Friends Arena	Hellacopters	53,770 / 53,770	$7,880,697
15 October	Arnhem	Netherlands	GelreDome	Leon Bridges	35,338 / 35,338	$6,146,461
19 October	Nanterre	France	U Arena	Cage the Elephant	109,126 / 109,126	$18,529,324
22 October	Nanterre	France	U Arena	Cage the Elephant	109,126 / 109,126	$18,529,324
25 October	Nanterre	France	U Arena	Cage the Elephant	109,126 / 109,126	$18,529,324

List of 2018 concerts
Date (2018)	City	Country	Venue	Opening act(s)	Attendance	Gross
17 May	Dublin	Republic of Ireland	Croke Park	The Academic	64,823 / 64,823	$8,771,102
22 May	London	England	London Stadium	Liam Gallagher	137,475 / 137,475	$20,496,695
25 May	London	England	London Stadium	Florence and the Machine	137,475 / 137,475	$20,496,695
29 May	Southampton	England	St Mary's Stadium	The Vaccines	26,582 / 26,582	$3,676,860
2 June	Coventry	England	Ricoh Arena	The Specials	31,599 / 31,599	$4,120,042
5 June	Manchester	England	Old Trafford	Richard Ashcroft	46,898 / 46,898	$7,321,969
9 June	Edinburgh	Scotland	BT Murrayfield Stadium	Richard Ashcroft	54,221 / 54,221	$8,187,100
15 June	Cardiff	Wales	Principality Stadium	Elbow	48,716 / 48,716	$6,635,778
19 June	London	England	Twickenham Stadium	James Bay	55,000 / 55,000	$11,105,252
22 June	Berlin	Germany	Olympiastadion	The Kooks	67,295 / 67,295	$12,113,470
26 June	Marseille	France	Orange Vélodrome	The Glorious Sons	53,409 / 53,409	$9,591,041
30 June	Stuttgart	Germany	Mercedes-Benz Arena	The Kooks	43,291 / 43,291	$8,785,685
4 July	Prague	Czech Republic	Letňany	Gotthard; Prazsky vyber	65,250 / 65,250	$8,674,940
8 July	Warsaw	Poland	PGE Narodowy	Trombone Shorty & Orleans Avenue	52,355 / 52,355	$8,364,676

List of 2019 concerts (Note: All the North American dates were postponed from their original events due to Mick Jagger recovering from a heart procedure)
Date (2019)	City	Country	Venue	Opening act(s)	Attendance	Gross
21 June	Chicago	United States	Soldier Field	St. Paul and the Broken Bones	98,228 / 98,228	$21,741,564
25 June	Chicago	United States	Soldier Field	Whiskey Myers	98,228 / 98,228	$21,741,564
29 June	Oro-Medonte	Canada	Burl's Creek Event Grounds	The Beaches; The Glorious Sons; Sloan; Dwayne Gretzky	—	—
3 July (Note: The concert in Landover on 3 July 2019 was originally scheduled to take place on 31 May 2019.)	Landover	United States	FedExField	Ghost Hounds	39,082 / 39,082	$9,257,202
7 July (Note: The concert in Foxborough on 7 July 2019 was originally scheduled to take place on 8 June 2019.)	Foxborough	United States	Gillette Stadium	Gary Clark Jr	49,669 / 49,669	$11,675,732
15 July (Note: The concert in New Orleans on 15 July 2019 was originally scheduled to take place on 14 July 2019, but postponed due to the Hurricane Barry.)	New Orleans	United States	Mercedes-Benz Superdome	Ivan Neville's Dumpstaphunk; The Soul Rebels	35,023 / 35,023	$7,163,692
19 July (Note: The concert in Jacksonville on 19 July 2019 was originally scheduled to take place on 24 April 2019.)	Jacksonville	United States	TIAA Bank Field	The Revivalists	50,358 / 50,358	$10,198,392
23 July (Note: The concert in Philadelphia on 23 July 2019 was originally scheduled to take place on 4 June 2019.)	Philadelphia	United States	Lincoln Financial Field	Des Rocs	51,115 / 51,115	$11,741,373
27 July (Note: The concert in Houston on 27 July 2019 was originally scheduled to take place on 28 April 2019.)	Houston	United States	NRG Stadium	Bishop Gunn	45,958 / 45,958	$11,068,397
1 August (Note: The concerts in East Rutherford on 1 and 5 August 2019 were originally scheduled to take place on 13 and 17 June 2019 respectively.)	East Rutherford	United States	MetLife Stadium	The Wombats	104,964 / 104,964	$25,510,438
5 August	East Rutherford	United States	MetLife Stadium	Lukas Nelson & Promise of the Real	104,964 / 104,964	$25,510,438
10 August (Note: The concert in Denver on 10 August 2019 was originally scheduled to take place on 26 May 2019.)	Denver	United States	Broncos Stadium at Mile High	Nathaniel Rateliff & the Night Sweats	58,846 / 58,846	$13,494,183
14 August (Note: The concert in Seattle on 14 August 2019 was originally scheduled to take place on 22 May 2019.)	Seattle	United States	CenturyLink Field	Lukas Nelson & Promise of the Real	53,363 / 53,363	$11,835,818
18 August (Note: The concert in Santa Clara on 18 August 2019was originally scheduled to take place on 18 May 2019.)	Santa Clara	United States	Levi's Stadium	Vista Kicks	47,578 / 47,578	$11,496,719
22 August (Note: The concert in Pasadena on 22 August 2019 was originally scheduled to take place on 11 May 2019.)	Pasadena	United States	Rose Bowl	Kaleo	56,974 / 56,974	$13,113,319
26 August (Note: The concert in Glendale on 26 August 2019 was originally scheduled to take place on 7 May 2019.)	Glendale	United States	State Farm Stadium	Kaleo	52,726 / 52,726	$9,747,170
30 August (Note: The concert in Miami on 31 August 2019 was originally scheduled to take place on 20 April 2019. Ultimately, due to the weather forecast, the concert was moved forward ahead of the impending hurricane to the day before i.e. on 30 August 2019. This concert was the last public performance of the band with Charlie Watts.)	Miami Gardens	United States	Hard Rock Stadium	Juanes	40,768 / 40,768	$9,762,771

List of 2021 concerts
Date (2021)	City	Country	Venue	Opening act(s)	Attendance	Gross
20 September (Note: The concert in Foxborough on 20 September 2021 was a private show hosted by Robert Kraft.)	Foxborough	United States	Gillette Stadium	—N/a	—N/a	—N/a
26 September (Note: The concert in St. Louis on 26 September 2021 was originally scheduled to take place on 27 June 2020.)	St. Louis	United States	The Dome at America's Center	The Revivalists	38,669 / 38,669	$7,203,265
30 September (Note: The concert in Charlotte on 30 September 2021 was originally scheduled to take place on 1 July 2020.)	Charlotte	United States	Bank of America Stadium	Ghost Hounds	42,577 / 42,577	$9,074,182
4 October (Note: The concert in Pittsburgh on 4 October 2021 was originally scheduled to take place on 23 June 2020.)	Pittsburgh	United States	Heinz Field	Ghost Hounds	43,702 / 43,702	$8,781,607
9 October (Note: The concert in Nashville on 9 October 2021 was originally scheduled to take place on 20 May 2020.)	Nashville	United States	Nissan Stadium	Ghost Hounds	42,964 / 42,964	$8,947,952
14 October	Los Angeles	United States	SoFi Stadium	Ghost Hounds	81,676 / 81,676	$18,887,679
17 October	Los Angeles	United States	SoFi Stadium	The Glorious Sons	81,676 / 81,676	$18,887,679
24 October (Note: The concert in Minneapolis on 24 October 2021 was originally scheduled to take place on 16 May 2020.)	Minneapolis	United States	U.S. Bank Stadium	Black Pumas	38,727 / 38,727	$8,039,757
29 October (Note: The concert in Tampa on 29 October 2021 was originally scheduled to take place on 5 July 2020.)	Tampa	United States	Raymond James Stadium	Ghost Hounds	52,075 / 52,075	$11,378,033
2 November (Note: The concert in Dallas on 2 November 2021 was originally scheduled to take place on 29 May 2020.)	Dallas	United States	Cotton Bowl	Juanes	42,469 / 42,469	$8,965,725
6 November	Las Vegas	United States	Allegiant Stadium	Måneskin	42,600 / 42,600	$14,804,562
11 November (Note: The concert in Atlanta on 11 November 2021 was originally scheduled to take place on 9 July 2020.)	Atlanta	United States	Mercedes-Benz Stadium	Zac Brown Band	49,915 / 49,915	$11,125,641
15 November (Note: The concert in Detroit on 15 November 2021 was originally scheduled to take place on 10 June 2020.)	Detroit	United States	Ford Field	Ayron Jones	40,250 / 40,250	$8,289,779
20 November (Note: The concert in Austin on 20 November 2021 was originally scheduled to take place on 24 May 2020.)	Austin	United States	Circuit of the Americas	Ghost Hounds	54,854 / 54,854	$10,078,193
23 November	Hollywood	United States	Hard Rock Live	Ghost Hounds	6,725 / 6,725	$5,330,360
Total					2,867,799	$546,515,799

=== Cancelled shows ===
List of cancelled concerts
Date	City	Country	Venue
2 May 2019 (Note: The concerts on 2 May 2019 and 13 October 2021 were due to be part of the New Orleans Jazz & Heritage Festival.)	New Orleans	United States	Fair Grounds Race Course
8 May 2020	San Diego	United States	SDCCU Stadium
12 May 2020	Vancouver	Canada	BC Place
6 June 2020	Buffalo	United States	New Era Field
14 June 2020	Louisville	United States	Cardinal Stadium
19 June 2020	Cleveland	United States	FirstEnergy Stadium
13 October 2021	New Orleans	United States	Fair Grounds Race Course

== Personnel ==
=== The Rolling Stones ===
- Mick Jagger – lead vocals, guitar, harmonica, percussion
- Keith Richards – guitars, backing vocals
- Ronnie Wood – guitars
- Charlie Watts – drums (2017–2019)

=== Additional musicians ===
- Darryl Jones – bass
- Steve Jordan – drums (2021, replacing Charlie Watts)
- Chuck Leavell – musical director, keyboards, backing vocals
- Sasha Allen – backing vocals
- Karl Denson – saxophone
- Tim Ries – saxophone, keyboards
- Matt Clifford – keyboards, percussion, French horn, show introduction voice
- Bernard Fowler – backing vocals, percussion

== See also ==
- List of Billboard Boxscore number-one concert series of the 2020s
- List of highest-grossing concert tours
