= Robert Heindl =

German criminologist and lawyer

Robert Heindl (24 July 1883 – 25 September 1958) was a German criminologist and lawyer, most noted for his advocacy of fingerprinting. This began after he read an article in 1902 on Edward Henry's use of the method in India - he requested the relevant files from the British imperial authorities in Calcutta, studied them extensively and then proposed to all the main police authorities in Germany that they adopt the technique. He was born in Munich and died in Irschenhausen. In 1953 he was awarded the Cross of Merit of the Order of Merit of the Federal Republic of Germany.
