= The Rolling Stones European Tour 1970 =

1970 concert tour by the Rolling Stones

- Continental tour by The Rolling Stones
- Location: Europe
- Start date: 30 August 1970
- End date: 9 October 1970
- Legs: 1
- No. of shows: 23

The Rolling Stones concert chronology
- American Tour 1969; European Tour 1970; UK Tour 1971

The Rolling Stones' 1970 European Tour was a concert tour of Continental Europe that took place during the late summer and early autumn 1970.

== History ==
This was the Stones' first tour in Europe since 1967, and became part of a pattern (not always followed) wherein the group would play North America, continental Europe, and the United Kingdom on a three-year rotating cycle.

Shows were similar to that of the 1969 American Tour, but with the material more familiar to audiences as Let It Bleed had now been out for some months. The Stones continued to preview new material, however, as "Brown Sugar", "Dead Flowers", and "You Gotta Move" were set list regulars; they would not appear on record until Sticky Fingers was released a half year later. Unlike many of the group's tours of this era, here the group only played one show a night with only one exception (Milan). The band played "Gimme Shelter" only once, in Malmo, Sweden (the first show of the tour). It can be heard on the bootleg Secrets Travel Fast, and features solos by Keith Richards, Bobby Keys, and Mick Taylor.

This was the first time the Rolling Stones toured with Staging including Lighting and Sound Systems. The Staging was composed of aluminium scaffolding sections to erect 2 tower structures and a "bridge" between that would be raised carrying back lights and curtains. It was designed by Martin Frances, Chip Monck and Bruce Byall. The Key Lights were 2 prototypes of the huge GLADIATOR (carbon arc) SpotLight (supplied by Strong Electric). 8 Super Trouper Spotlights were also used for front lighting.

Following a tradition set since the band's earliest days, the tour was not without its altercations. The show at Råsunda stadion in Stockholm on 4 September was interrupted by police who feared that fans, provoked by Jagger, would storm the stage. The singer duly responded by pointing the microphone to the police on stage and soon after suggested the audience would sit down for the next song (the slower "Love in Vain"). On 14 September a thousand or so forged tickets were rejected at a show at Ernst-Merck-Halle in Hamburg; two hundred policemen were needed to handle disappointed fans. Two days later at Deutschlandhalle in West Berlin, there were nasty battles between assorted youths and the police before the show, and some 50 arrests were made. Then on 1 October at Milan's Palazzo Dello Sport, two thousand youths tried to crash the gates to get into the show. Police had to use tear gas to quell the riot; there were injuries among both the cops and the crowd, and 63 arrests were made.

No live recordings of the tour have been officially released; there is only one known soundboard recording from Paris.

== Personnel ==
=== The Rolling Stones ===
- Mick Jagger – lead vocals, harmonica
- Keith Richards – guitar, backing vocals
- Mick Taylor – guitar
- Bill Wyman – bass guitar
- Charlie Watts – drums

=== Additional musicians ===
- Ian Stewart – piano
- Bobby Keys – saxophone
- Jim Price – trumpet, trombone
- Stephen Stills – piano (only on 9 October, most likely for the entire show)

== Tour set list ==
The fairly typical set list for the tour was:

1. "Jumpin' Jack Flash"
2. "Roll Over Beethoven"
3. "Sympathy for the Devil"
4. "Stray Cat Blues"
5. "Love in Vain"
6. "Prodigal Son"
7. "You Gotta Move"
8. "Dead Flowers"
9. "Midnight Rambler"
10. "Live With Me"
11. "Let It Rock"
12. "Little Queenie"
13. "Brown Sugar"
14. "Honky Tonk Women"
15. "Street Fighting Man"

== Tour dates ==
Date	City	Country	Venue
30 August 1970	Malmö	Sweden	Baltiska hallen
2 September 1970	Helsinki	Finland	Helsinki Olympic Stadium
4 September 1970	Stockholm	Sweden	Råsunda Stadium
6 September 1970	Gothenburg	Sweden	Liseberg
9 September 1970	Aarhus	Denmark	Vejlby-Risskov Hallen
11 September 1970	Copenhagen	Denmark	Forum Copenhagen
12 September 1970	Copenhagen	Denmark	Forum Copenhagen
14 September 1970	Hamburg	West Germany	Ernst-Merck-Halle
16 September 1970	West Berlin	West Germany	Deutschlandhalle
18 September 1970	Cologne	West Germany	Sporthalle
20 September 1970	Stuttgart	West Germany	Killesbergpark
22 September 1970	Paris	France	Palais des Sports
23 September 1970	Paris	France	Palais des Sports
24 September 1970	Paris	France	Palais des Sports
26 September 1970	Vienna	Austria	Wiener Stadthalle
29 September 1970	Rome	Italy	Palazzo dello Sport
1 October 1970 (2 shows)	Milan	Italy	Palazzetto Lido Sport
3 October 1970	Lyon	France	Palais des Sports de Gerland
5 October 1970	Frankfurt	West Germany	Festhalle Frankfurt
6 October 1970	Frankfurt	West Germany	Festhalle Frankfurt
7 October 1970	Essen	West Germany	Grugahalle
9 October 1970	Amsterdam	Netherlands	RAI Amsterdam Convention Centre
