= Robert Heindel =

American painter (1938–2005)

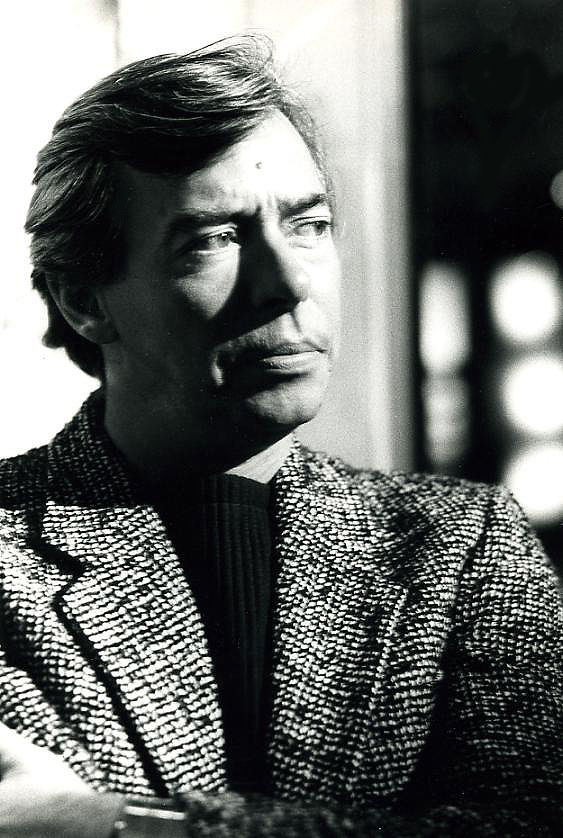
- artist Robert Heindel c. 1980
- Born: October 1, 1938; Toledo, Ohio
- Died: July 3, 2005 (aged 66); Guilford, Connecticut
- Education: Famous Artists School
- Known for: Painting; Illustration
- Awards: Hamilton King Award; Society of Illustrators Hall of Fame

Robert Heindel (October 1, 1938 – July 3, 2005) was an American painter, illustrator, and stage designer best known for his paintings of dance and performing arts. Heindel created over 1300 paintings and drawings of dance and performing arts during a twenty-five year period in the late twentieth century. He was described as the best painter of dance of his time.

Well-known patrons of dance and the performing arts collected Heindel's works and sponsored his exhibitions, including Princess Diana, Princess Margaret, Princess Caroline, Prince and Princess Takamado, and Andrew Lloyd Webber. His works are found in the permanent collections of museums including the Smithsonian National Portrait Gallery, the National Portrait Gallery, London, the Norman Rockwell Museum, and the Glasgow Museums.

== Early life and career ==
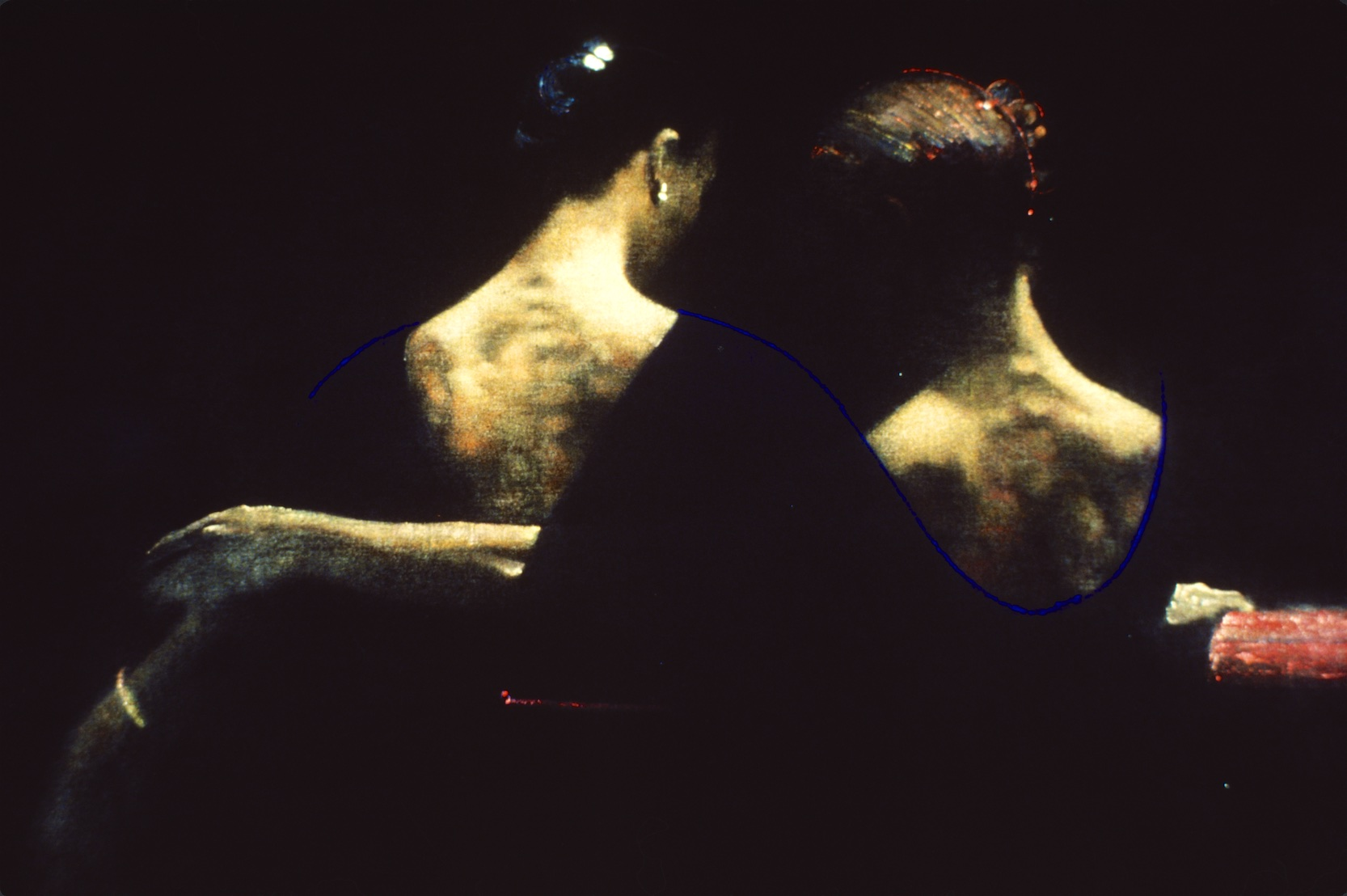
Two Dancers, 1975, Oil on canvas

Heindel was born in Toledo, Ohio, the oldest of three adopted sons, to working-class parents Charlotte and Robert Heindel. His mother worked at the local Willy's Jeep factory assembling carburetors. His father was an engineer and piano player. Heindel began painting at an early age, encouraged by his parents, though especially his mother who believed him to be gifted. Heindel enrolled at the Famous Artists School at 16, eventually becoming one of its most celebrated graduates.

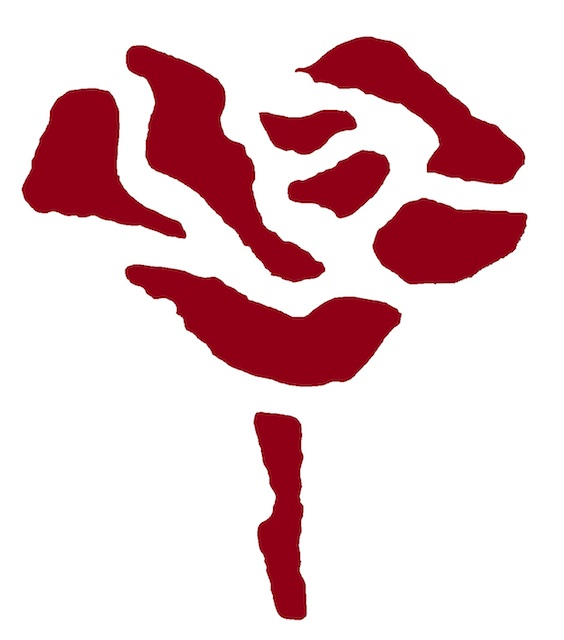

Heindel married Rosalie (Rose) Petres in 1959. They had three sons: Toby (born February 28, 1960, died September 20, 1990), Troy (born December 1, 1961) and Todd (born September 7, 1966). Heindel often signed his paintings with the symbol of his wife Rose.

During his 25-year illustration career Heindel was friends with and competed against the best illustrators of the late twentieth century, including Bob Peak, Bernie Fuchs, Mark English, Fred Otnes, and Alan E. Cober. Together, they created an annual educational event called the Illustrator's Workshop to teach young illustrators about the illustration business.

Heindel reached the top of the illustration business in the early 1980s, his work having appeared in nearly every major print magazine such as 'Sports Illustrated', 'TV Guide', 'Ladies Home Journal', 'Redbook', the 'Saturday Evening Post', and 'Time' magazine. Heindel's 'Time' magazine cover of Daniel Ellsberg resides in the permanent collection of The Smithsonian National Portrait Gallery. In 2011, he was posthumously inducted into the Illustrators Hall of Fame. While Heindel benefited from advances in photography and publishing, he foresaw the impact technology would ultimately have on the commercial illustration business. Heindel was known to comment to students that they needed to be prepared for a change in the illustration business, comparing 20th century illustrators to West Virginia coal miners. At the height of his illustration career in the 1980s, Heindel pivoted into fine art; instead of painting American football players for 'Sports Illustrated,' he began to paint dancers, something he had wanted to do since first seeing the Royal Ballet's Rudolph Nureyev and Margot Fonteyn dance 'Paradise Lost' in 1962.

== Fine Art, Dance and Set Design ==
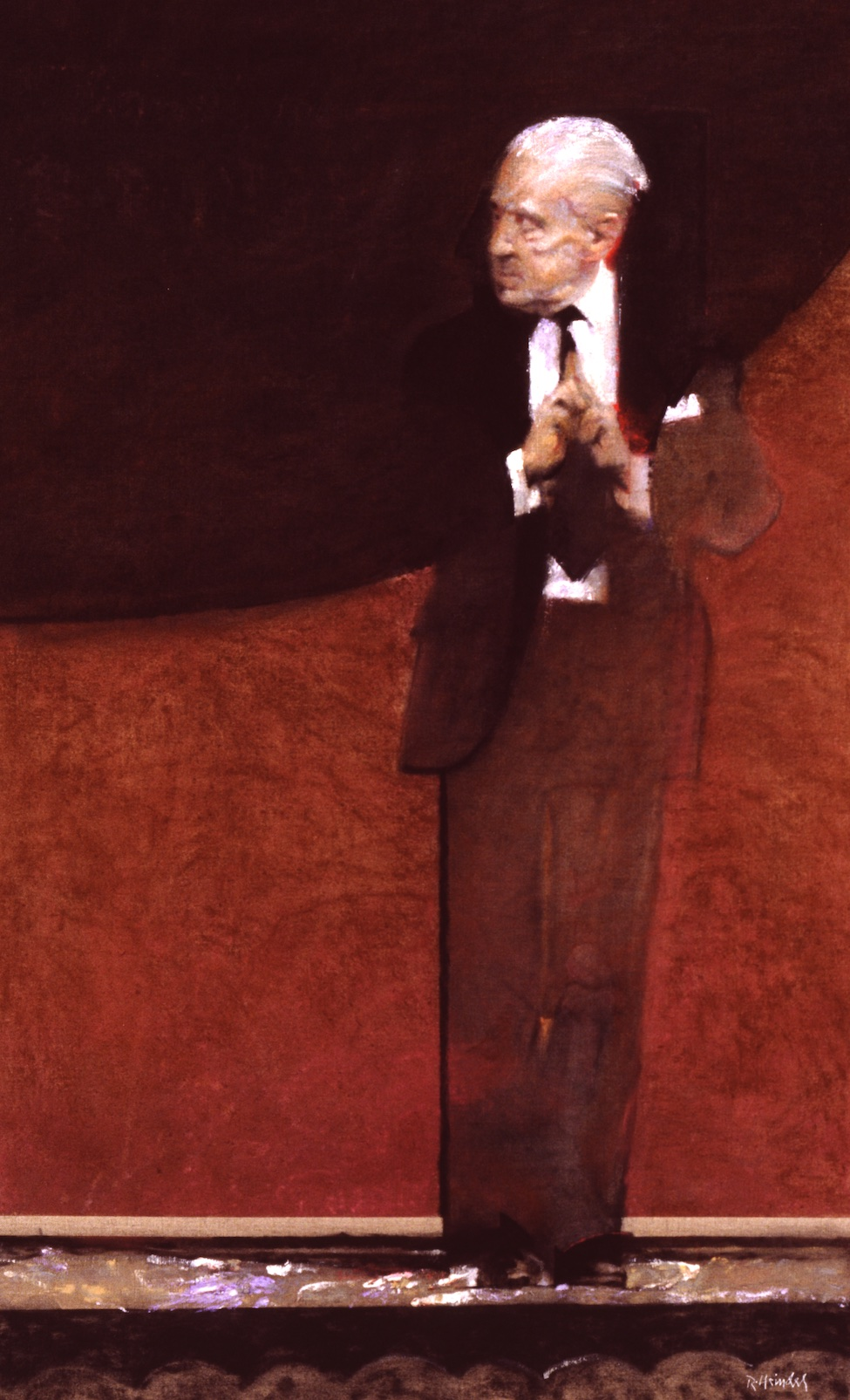
Sir Frederick Ashton, 1985, National Portrait Gallery, London

At 44, Heindel was considered too old to be entering the world of fine art, access that was often controlled by established New York galleries. Heindel adopted a strategy of collaboration, study, and contemporaneous exhibition that would gain him access to the best dancers and performing arts companies around the world. Heindel would spend one to two years preparing for a major exhibition. Months before entering the studio to paint, he would partner with a ballet company, working closely with the artistic director, choreographer and principal dancers, observing and photographing rehearsals. Heindel rarely created images from final performances, preferring instead to paint dancers at rehearsal.

After gathering material, Heindel would retreat to his studio in Easton, CT for six to nine months, creating studies and paintings, capturing the major themes of the performance. Exhibition of the paintings, 30 to 100 paintings and drawings, would take place at or near the performance venue at about the same time as the first performance.

Anthony Dowell, artistic director of The Royal Ballet, said of Heindel's method:

Sometimes, during the weary hours of rehearsal, the last thing a dancer needs is an intruder with a sketch book or camera recording all the trials and secret worries that we all have whilst trying to accomplish the impossible. Robert Heindel, apart from being one of the most courteous and charming of men, manages to camouflage himself into the studio setting, somehow hiding his 'spying' eyes. Many silent photos later, and after the magic process has taken place in his studio, one is presented with not only a true image of oneself but with a beautiful study and record of the private moments that one thought had been hidden.

Heindel was commissioned in 1987 by Andrew Lloyd Webber to paint impressions from the musicals Cats and The Phantom of the Opera.

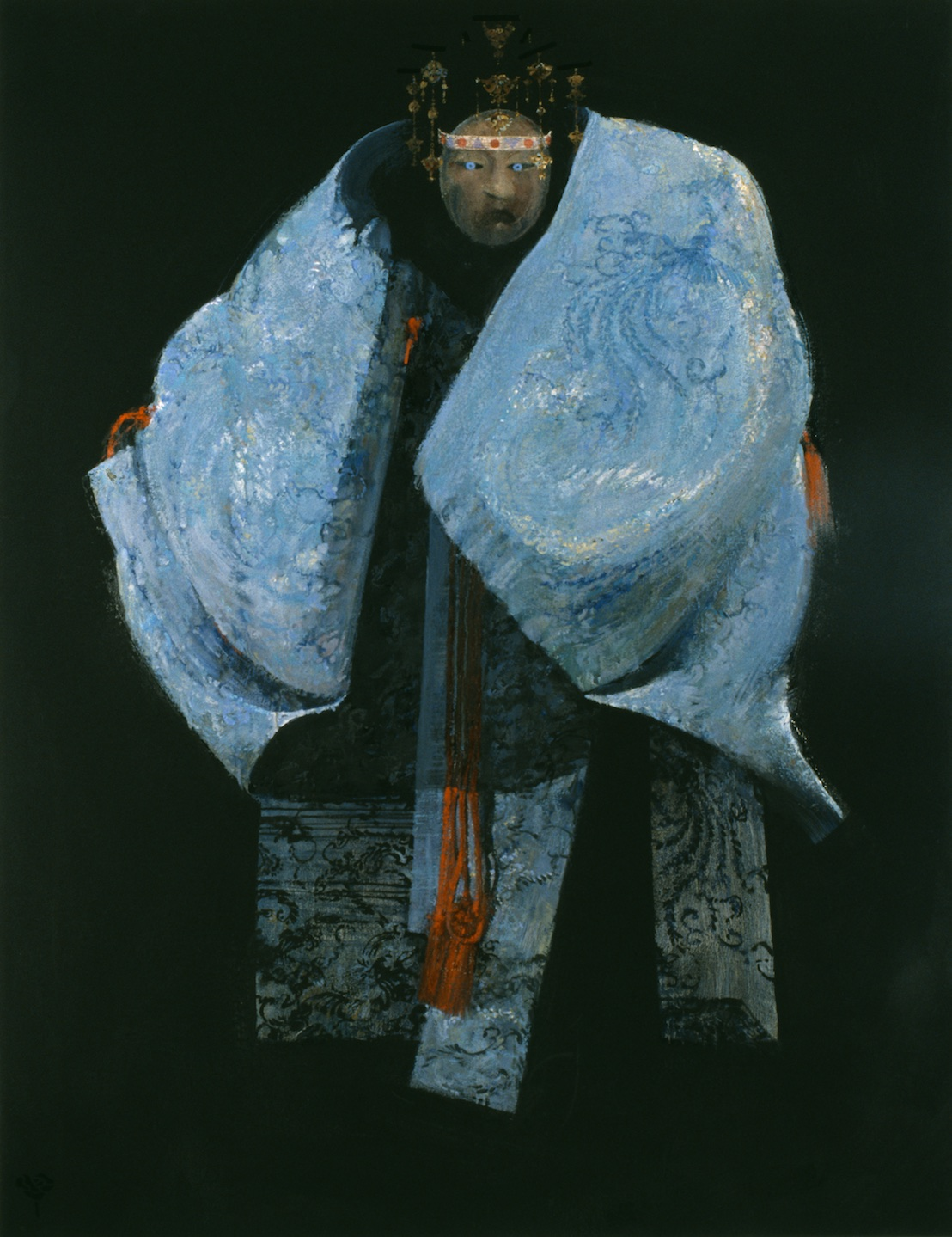
Noh Painting No. 12, 1996, private collection

In 1996, Heindel had the opportunity to produce paintings from a Kabuki production. The occasion was a performance of the Kabuki dance Yasuna, performed by Onoe Kikugoro VII. The story of Yasuna, who loses his fiancée just before their marriage and then, insane with grief, wanders around the countryside in spring wearing her fiancee's silk kimono, touched the memory of the grief Heindel felt when he lost his son Toby six years before.

"I'm always very interested," Heindel said, "in cultural differences. My involvement with dance and the theater usually means I am driven into some creative activity. In Japanese culture, I am also most interested in dance. However, once I pursue any of the themes that grip us, like love or defeat, life or death, I feel almost no difference between the cultures." Heindel tried to cast the world of Kabuki within the context of the universal themes that humankind shares and that go beyond East or West within the world of his own paintings.

== Death ==
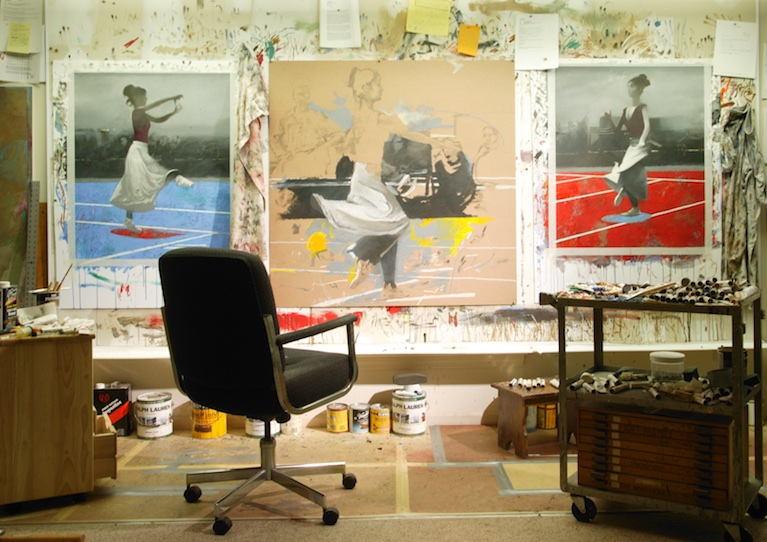
Heindel's studio, 2005, shortly after his death

Robert Heindel died at his home in Guilford, Connecticut on July 3, 2005, after a 10-year struggle with emphysema. There were three unfinished dance paintings in his studio. Prior to his death, Heindel had commented that once he could no longer climb the stairs to his studio to paint, it would be time for him to leave
