= Heindl =

Heindl is a German surname. Notable people with the surname include:

- Bill Heindl Sr. (1922–1979), Canadian ice hockey player
- Bill Heindl Jr. (1946–1992), Canadian ice hockey player
- Elmer Heindl (1910–2006), U.S. Army chaplain
- Robert Heindl (1883–1958), German criminologist and lawyer
- Sebastian Heindl (born 1997), German organist
