= Live in Texas '78 =

The Rolling Stones Some Girls Live In Texas '78
- Directed by: Bob Clearmountain
- Produced by: Mick Jagger; Keith Richards; Charlie Watts; Ronnie Wood
- Production company: Eagle Studio
- Release date: November 21, 2011
- Running time: 105 minutes
- Country: United States
- Language: English

Live In Texas '78 is a 2011 documentary film about the recording of The Rolling Stones 1978 tour of the US in support of that year's Some Girls album.

== Track list ==
All songs are written by Mick Jagger and Keith Richards, except the ones which are noted.

1. "Let It Rock" (Chuck Berry)
2. "All Down the Line"
3. "Honky Tonk Women"
4. "Star Star"
5. "When the Whip Comes Down"
6. "Beast of Burden"
7. "Miss You"
8. "Just My Imagination" (Norman Whitfield/Barrett Strong)
9. "Shattered"
10. "Respectable"
11. "Far Away Eyes"
12. "Love in Vain" - (Robert Johnson)
13. "Tumbling Dice"
14. "Happy"
15. "Sweet Little Sixteen" (Chuck Berry)
16. "Brown Sugar"
17. "Jumpin' Jack Flash"
