= The Singles 1971–2006 =

Box set by The Rolling Stones
- Released: 26 April 2011
- Recorded: December 1969 – June 2005
- Genre: Rock
- Length: 823:46
- Label: Promotone/Universal
- Producers: Jimmy Miller, The Glimmer Twins, Chris Kimsey, Steve Lillywhite, Don Was, The Dust Brothers

The Rolling Stones chronology
The Rolling Stones Box Set (2010)	The Singles 1971–2006 (2011)	Brussels Affair (Live 1973) (2011)

Professional ratings
Review scores
Source	Rating
AllMusic	3.5/5 stars

The Singles 1971–2006 is a box set compilation of singles by the Rolling Stones spanning the years 1971 to 2006. It covers their output with both Rolling Stones Records and Virgin Records labels.

A sequel of sorts to ABKCO's three boxes of singles replicas from the band's first decade (Singles 1963–1965, Singles 1965–1967, Singles 1968–1971), Universal's The Singles: 1971–2006 is a 45-disc box set consisting of 173 tracks as single replicas of both sleeves and labels for every 45 the Rolling Stones released between Sticky Fingers and A Bigger Bang.

This first edition of the set contained a skip around the four-second mark on the B-side, "I Think I'm Going Mad". The error was fixed in a subsequent edition.

== Track listing ==
All songs by Mick Jagger and Keith Richards, except where noted.

Disc one

1. "Brown Sugar" – 3:50
2. "Bitch" – 3:36
3. "Let It Rock" (Live) (Chuck Berry) – 2:39
  - Recorded live at Leeds, 13 March 1971

Disc two

1. "Wild Horses" – 5:43
2. "Sway" – 3:25

Disc three

1. "Tumbling Dice" – 3:44
2. "Sweet Black Angel" – 2:54

Disc four

1. "Happy" – 3:05
2. "All Down the Line" – 3:57
  - Mono single mix

Disc five

1. "Angie" – 4:33
2. "Silver Train" – 4:27

Disc six

1. "Doo Doo Doo Doo Doo (Heartbreaker)" – 3:27
2. "Dancing with Mr. D." – 4:51

Disc seven

1. "It's Only Rock 'n Roll (But I Like It)" – 5:09
2. "Through the Lonely Nights" – 4:12

Disc eight

1. "Ain't Too Proud to Beg" (Norman Whitfield/Eddie Holland) – 3:30
2. "Dance Little Sister" – 4:07

Disc nine

1. "Fool to Cry" – 5:07
2. "Crazy Mama" – 4:35

Disc ten

1. "Hot Stuff" – 5:23
2. "Fool to Cry" – 5:05

Disc eleven

1. "Miss You" – 3:37
2. "Far Away Eyes" – 3:46
3. "Miss You" (12" Version) – 8:35

Disc twelve

1. "Beast of Burden" – 4:27
2. "When the Whip Comes Down" – 4:20

Disc thirteen

1. "Respectable" – 3:10
2. "When the Whip Comes Down" – 4:21

Disc fourteen

1. "Shattered" – 3:49
2. "Everything Is Turning to Gold" (Jagger/Richards/Ronnie Wood) – 4:06

Disc fifteen

1. "Emotional Rescue" – 5:40
2. "Down in the Hole" – 3:57

Disc sixteen

1. "She's So Cold" – 4:13
2. "Send It to Me" – 3:43

Disc seventeen

1. "Start Me Up" – 3:34
2. "No Use in Crying" (Jagger/Richards/Wood) – 3:26

Disc eighteen

1. "Waiting on a Friend" – 4:36
2. "Little T&A" – 3:21

Disc nineteen

1. "Hang Fire" – 2:24
2. "Neighbours" – 3:32

Disc twenty

1. "Going to a Go-Go" (Live) (William Robinson/Warren Moore/Robert Rogers/Marvin Tarplin) – 3:26
2. "Beast of Burden" (Live) – 5:03

Disc twenty-one

1. "Time Is on My Side" (Live) (Norman Meade) – 3:44
2. "Twenty Flight Rock" (Live) (Eddie Cochran/Ned Fairchild) – 1:47
3. "Under My Thumb" (Live) – 4:06

Disc twenty-two

1. "Undercover of the Night" – 4:33
2. "All the Way Down" – 3:14
3. "Undercover of the Night" (Dub Version) – 6:24
4. "Feel On Baby" (Instrumental Dub) – 6:30

Disc twenty-three

1. "She Was Hot" – 4:44
2. "I Think I'm Going Mad" – 4:22

Disc twenty-four

1. "Too Tough" – 3:50
2. "Miss You" – 3:36

Disc twenty-five

1. "Harlem Shuffle" (Bob Relf/Ernest Nelson) – 3:26
2. "Had It with You" (Jagger/Richards/Wood) – 3:20
3. "Harlem Shuffle" (NY Mix) (Relf/Nelson) – 6:36
4. "Harlem Shuffle" (London Mix) (Relf/Nelson) – 6:21

Disc twenty-six

1. "One Hit (To the Body)" (Jagger/Richards/Wood) – 4:10
2. "Fight" (Jagger/Richards/Wood) – 3:11
3. "One Hit (To the Body)" (London Mix) (Jagger/Richards/Wood) – 7:02

Disc twenty-seven

1. "Mixed Emotions" – 4:04
2. "Fancy Man Blues" – 4:55
3. "Mixed Emotions" (Chris Kimsey's 12") – 6:13
4. "Tumbling Dice" – 3:44
5. "Miss You" – 3:37

Disc twenty-eight

1. "Rock and a Hard Place" – 4:12
2. "Cook Cook Blues" – 4:12
3. "Rock and a Hard Place" (Dance Mix) – 6:54
4. "Rock and a Hard Place" (Oh-Oh Hard Dub Mix) – 6:55
5. "Rock and a Hard Place" (Michael Brauer Mix) – 7:06
6. "Rock and a Hard Place" (Bonus Beats Mix) – 4:09
7. "Emotional Rescue" – 5:36
8. "Some Girls" – 4:38
9. "It's Only Rock 'n Roll (But I Like It)" – 5:07
10. "Rocks Off" – 4:31

Disc twenty-nine

1. "Almost Hear You Sigh" (Jagger/Richards/Steve Jordan) – 4:37
2. "Break the Spell" – 3:07
3. "Wish I'd Never Met You" – 4:44
4. "Mixed Emotions" – 4:03
5. "Beast of Burden" – 4:26
6. "Angie" – 4:32
7. "Fool to Cry" – 5:05
8. "Miss You" – 3:36
9. "Waiting on a Friend" – 4:35

Disc thirty

1. "Terrifying" (7" Remix) – 4:11
2. "Rock and a Hard Place" (7" Version) – 4:10
3. "Terrifying" (12" Remix) – 6:56
4. "Rock and a Hard Place" (Dance Mix) – 6:54
5. "Harlem Shuffle" (London Mix) (Relf/Nelson) – 6:21
6. "Wish I'd Never Met You" – 4:42
7. "Harlem Shuffle" (LP Version) (Relf/Nelson) – 3:24

Disc thirty-one

1. "Highwire" – 3:47
2. "2000 Light Years from Home" (Live) – 3:29
3. "Highwire" (Full Length Version) – 4:44
4. "Sympathy for the Devil" (Live) – 5:24
5. "I Just Want to Make Love to You" (Live) (Willie Dixon) – 4:03
6. "Play with Fire" (Live) (Nanker Phelge) – 3:30
7. "Factory Girl" (Live) – 2:35
  - Tracks 2 & 4–7 recorded during Steel Wheels/Urban Jungle 1989–90 World Tour

Disc thirty-two

1. "Ruby Tuesday" (Live) – 4:13
2. "Play with Fire" (Live) (Phelge) – 3:21
3. "You Can't Always Get What You Want" (Live) – 7:06
4. "Undercover of the Night" (Live) – 4:11
5. "Rock and a Hard Place" (Live) – 5:13
6. "Harlem Shuffle" (Live) (Relf/Nelson) – 4:04
7. "Winning Ugly VI" (London Mix) – 7:53

Disc thirty-three

1. "Sex Drive" (Single Edit) – 4:29
2. "Undercover of the Night" (Live) – 4:17

Disc thirty-four

1. "Love Is Strong" (Album Version) – 3:38
2. "The Storm" – 2:45
3. "So Young" – 3:22
4. "Love Is Strong" (Bob Clearmountain Remix) – 3:49
5. "Love Is Strong" (Teddy Riley Radio Remix) – 4:07
6. "Love Is Strong" (Teddy Riley Extended Remix) – 5:05
7. "Love Is Strong" (Teddy Riley Extended Rock Remix) – 4:48
8. "Love Is Strong" (Teddy Riley Dub Remix) – 4:06
9. "Love Is Strong" (Joe The Butcher Club Mix) – 5:24
10. "Love Is Strong" (Teddy Riley Instrumental) – 4:46

Disc thirty-five

1. "You Got Me Rocking" – 3:36
2. "Jump on Top of Me" – 4:23
3. "You Got Me Rocking" (Perfecto Mix) – 5:02
4. "You Got Me Rocking" (Sexy Disco Dub Mix) – 6:16
5. "You Got Me Rocking" (Trance Mix) – 4:59

Disc thirty-six

1. "Out of Tears" (Don Was Edit) – 4:22
2. "I'm Gonna Drive" – 3:42
3. "Out of Tears" (Bob Clearmountain Remix Edit) – 4:21
4. "So Young" – 3:22
5. "Sparks Will Fly" (Radio Clean Version) – 3:15

Disc thirty-seven

1. "I Go Wild" (LP Version) – 4:21
2. "I Go Wild" (Scott Litt Remix) – 4:35
3. "I Go Wild" (Live) – 6:30
  - Recorded in Miami, Florida, on 25 November 1994
4. "I Go Wild" (Luis Resto Straight Vocal Mix) – 5:40

Disc thirty-eight

1. "Like a Rolling Stone" (Live) (Album Version) (Bob Dylan) – 5:38
  - Recorded in London on 19 July 1995
2. "Black Limousine" (Live) (Jagger/Richards/Wood) – 3:28
3. "All Down the Line" (Live) – 4:24
4. "Like a Rolling Stone" (Live) (Edit) (Dylan) – 4:20

Disc thirty-nine

1. "Anybody Seen My Baby?" (LP Edit) (Jagger/Richards/k.d. lang/Ben Mink) – 4:08
2. "Anybody Seen My Baby?" (Soul Solution Remix Edit) (Jagger/Richards/lang/Mink) – 4:24
3. "Anybody Seen My Baby?" (Armand's Rolling Steelo Mix) (Jagger/Richards/lang/Mink) – 10:28
4. "Anybody Seen My Baby?" (Soul Solution Remix) (Jagger/Richards/lang/Mink) – 9:29
5. "Anybody Seen My Baby?" (Bonus Roll) (Jagger/Richards/lang/Mink) – 5:58
6. "Anybody Seen My Baby?" (Album Version) (Jagger/Richards/lang/Mink) – 4:32

Disc forty

1. "Saint of Me" (Radio Edit) – 4:11
2. "Anyway You Look at It" – 4:20
3. "Gimme Shelter" (Voodoo Lounge Tour) – 6:53 (Mistakenly credited as recorded on the Live Licks Tour on the sleeve)
4. "Saint of Me" (Deep Dish Grunge Garage Remix Parts 1 & 2) – 13:34
5. "Saint of Me" (Deep Dish Grunge Garage Dub) – 7:25
6. "Saint of Me" (Deep Dish Rolling Dub) – 7:17
7. "Anybody Seen My Baby?" (Bonus Roll) (Jagger/Richards/lang/Mink) – 6:01
8. "Anybody Seen My Baby?" (Phil Jones Remix) (Jagger/Richards/lang/Mink) – 4:26
9. "Saint of Me" (Deep Dish Club Mix) – 7:30
10. "Saint of Me" (Deep Dish Grunge Dub) – 7:23
11. "Saint of Me" (Todd Terry Extended Remix) – 5:57

Disc forty-one

1. "Out of Control" (Album Radio Edit) – 3:48
2. "Out of Control" (In Hand with Fluke Radio Edit) – 4:33
3. "Out of Control" (Bi-Polar at the Controls) – 5:12
4. "Out of Control" (Bi-Polar Outer Version) – 5:11
5. "Out of Control" (In Hand with Fluke Instrumental) – 5:54
6. "Out of Control" (In Hand with Fluke Full Version) – 8:27
7. "Out of Control" (Bi-Polar's Fat Controller Mix) – 5:24
8. "Out of Control" (Saber Final Mix) – 5:44

Disc forty-two

1. "Don't Stop" (Edit) – 3:31
  - Mixed by Bob Clearmountain
2. "Don't Stop" (New Rock Mix) – 4:02
  - Mixed by Jack Joseph Puig
3. "Miss You" (Remix) – 8:34
  - Mixed by Bob Clearmountain

Disc forty-three

1. "Streets of Love" – 5:10
2. "Rough Justice" – 3:11

Disc forty-four

1. "Rain Fall Down" (will.i.am Remix) – 4:06
2. "Rain Fall Down" (Radio Edit) – 4:02
3. "Rain Fall Down" (Ashley Beedle's 'Heavy Disco' Radio Edit) – 4:04
4. "Rain Fall Down" (Ashley Beedle's 'Heavy Disco' Vocal Re-Edit) – 6:10

Disc forty-five

1. "Biggest Mistake" – 4:07
2. "Dance (Pt. 1)" (Live) (Jagger/Richards/Wood) – 6:02
3. "Before They Make Me Run" (Live) – 3:56
4. "Hand of Fate" (Live) – 4:03
  - Tracks 2–4 recorded at the Olympic Theatre, Paris, 2003
