= The Rolling Stones US Tour 1978 =

1978 concert tour by the Rolling Stones

- National tour by The Rolling Stones
- Location: United States
- Associated album: Some Girls
- Start date: 10 June 1978
- End date: 26 July 1978
- Legs: 1
- No. of shows: 25

The Rolling Stones concert chronology
- Tour of Europe '76; US Tour 1978; American Tour 1981

The Rolling Stones' US Tour 1978 was a concert tour of the United States that took place during June and July 1978, immediately following the release of the group's 1978 album Some Girls. Like the 1972 and 1975 U.S. tours, Bill Graham was the tour promoter. One opening act was Peter Tosh, who was sometimes joined by Mick Jagger for their duet "Don't Look Back". The Outlaws backed up Peter Tosh. Another act opening was Etta James, famous for her song "At Last".

== History ==
The tour used a stripped back, minimal stage show compared to the previous Tour of the Americas '75 and Tour of Europe '76, possibly due to the emergence of the punk rock scene and its emphasis solely on music and attitude rather than presenting a grandiose stage extravaganza.

Continuing a schedule started in 1966 of touring the United States exactly every three years, the Stones played in a mixture of theatres, sometimes under a pseudonym (i.e., at the start of the 1978 US Tour in Lakeland, Florida, as well as in Fort Worth on July 18, The Stones were billed on the tickets as "The London Green Shoed Cowboys"), arenas, and stadiums, a practice that they would follow for many of their future tours as well. The tour was the first in which Charlie Watts used the famous Gretsch drum set that he continued to play with the Stones until his death, as well as his first employment of a China crash cymbal. The concerts featured backing vocals by Ronnie Wood and Keith Richards, something that the Stones would get away from beginning with their next tour when Richards handled the majority of the backing vocals himself.

Plans were made to bring this tour to Europe, with several locations in major cities booked, but plans were scrapped for financial reasons. This broke the group's similar schedule of performing in Europe every three years, which had started in 1967. This gap-year from touring prompted Keith Richards to join Ronnie Wood on his 1979 United States solo tour, to promote his then-album Gimme Some Neck, in the process forming the band The New Barbarians.

== Reception ==
Rock critic Robert Christgau wrote that the 1978 Tour was an improvement over the group's previous go-around, "especially when Mick [Jagger] stopped prancing long enough to pick up a guitar and get into the good new songs from Some Girls." The tour is widely believed among fans to be one of the band's greatest, largely because it was in many ways back to basics both in musical and visual terms. It meant a return to a mixture of classic Stones numbers ("Tumbling Dice", "Star Star", "Happy", "Brown Sugar", etc.) mixed with blues numbers and Chuck Berry covers ("Let it Rock and "Sweet Little Sixteen" in particular) as well as including a large number of songs from the then-newly released Some Girls LP. It was the first tour featuring songs written with Ronnie Wood as an official member of the Rolling Stones, and his contributions from this period are considered by many Stones fans as some of his greatest with the band. While no live album was released immediately following this tour, a fair number of bootleg releases showcased its musical qualities – most notably the multi-show King Biscuit Flower Hour FM recording often known as "Handsome Girls". In 2011, a CD and DVD set was released of a July 1978 performance from Fort Worth, Texas entitled Some Girls: Live in Texas '78. In addition to the complete concert, the DVD included the three songs played on the Saturday Night Live television show in October 1978.

Guest artists that played with the Stones during individual shows included Linda Ronstadt, Eddie Money, Doug Kershaw, Bobby Keys and Nicky Hopkins. Opening acts included Van Halen, Journey, Peter Tosh, Patti Smith, Southside Johnny and the Asbury Jukes, Foreigner, Eddie Money, Kansas, Etta James, Furry Lewis, Atlanta Rhythm Section, April Wine, The Outlaws, and the Doobie Brothers.

== Personnel ==
=== The Rolling Stones ===
- Mick Jagger – lead vocals, guitar, keyboards
- Keith Richards – guitars, vocals
- Ronnie Wood – guitars, pedal steel guitar, backing vocals
- Bill Wyman – bass guitar
- Charlie Watts – drums

=== Additional musicians ===
- Ian Stewart – piano
- Ian McLagan – keyboards, backing vocals

== Tour set list ==
A typical set list for the tour, with minor variations involving one or two of the numbers being omitted:

1. "Let It Rock" (Chuck Berry)
2. "All Down the Line"
3. "Honky Tonk Women"
4. "Star Star"
5. "When the Whip Comes Down"
6. "Beast of Burden"
7. "Lies"
8. "Miss You"
9. "Just My Imagination (Running Away with Me)"
10. "Shattered"
11. "Respectable"
12. "Far Away Eyes"
13. "Love in Vain"
14. "Tumbling Dice"
15. "Happy"
16. "Sweet Little Sixteen (Chuck Berry)"
17. "Brown Sugar"
18. "Jumpin' Jack Flash"
19. Encore: "(I Can't Get No) Satisfaction", "Street Fighting Man" (most shows had no encore).
1. "Hound Dog" (played only in Lexington and Memphis)

== Tour dates ==
List of tour dates with date, city, country, venue, references
| Date (1978) | City | Country | Venue | Attendance | Gross | Support act(s) |
|---|---|---|---|---|---|---|
| 10 June | Lakeland | United States | Lakeland Civic Center | —N/a | | Henry Paul Band |
| 12 June | Atlanta | United States | Fox Theatre | —N/a | | Patti Smith Group |
| 14 June | Passaic | United States | Capitol Theatre | 3,506 / 3,506 | $36,813 | Etta James |
| 15 June | Washington, D.C. | United States | Warner Theatre | —N/a | | Etta James |
| 17 June | Philadelphia | United States | John F. Kennedy Stadium | —N/a | | Foreigner; Peter Tosh |
| 19 June | New York City | United States | Palladium | —N/a | | Peter Tosh |
| 21 June | Hampton | United States | Hampton Roads Coliseum | —N/a | | Peter Tosh |
| 22 June | Myrtle Beach | United States | Myrtle Beach Convention Center | —N/a | | |
| 26 June | Greensboro | United States | Greensboro Memorial Coliseum | 15,744 / 15,744 | $152,030 | Etta James |
| 28 June | Memphis | United States | Mid-South Coliseum | 11,999 / 11,999 | $118,240 | —N/a |
| 29 June | Lexington | United States | Rupp Arena | 24,928 / 24,928 | $213,613 | Eddie Money |
| 1 July (Note: The concert on 1 July was a part of the World Series of Rock.) | Cleveland | United States | Cleveland Stadium | 82,500 / 82,500 | $1,025,037 | Peter Tosh; Kansas |
| 4 July | Orchard Park | United States | Rich Stadium | Journey; Atlanta Rhythm Section; April Wine | | |
| 6 July | Detroit | United States | Detroit Masonic Temple | —N/a | | |
| 8 July | Chicago | United States | Soldier Field | 70,725 / 70,725 | $919,425 | Journey; Peter Tosh; Southside Johnny |
| 10 July | Saint Paul | United States | Saint Paul Civic Center | 18,000 / 18,000 | $180,000 | Peter Tosh |
| 11 July | St. Louis | United States | Kiel Opera House | 3,557 / 3,557 | $35,570 | Peter Tosh |
| 13 July | New Orleans | United States | Louisiana Superdome | 80,173 | $1,060,000 | The Doobie Brothers; Van Halen |
| 16 July | Boulder | United States | Folsom Field | 60,000 / 60,000 | $690,000 | Kansas; Eddie Money; Peter Tosh |
| 18 July | Fort Worth | United States | Will Rogers Memorial Center | —N/a | | |
| 19 July | Houston | United States | Sam Houston Coliseum | 12,271 / 12,271 | $122,710 | Peter Tosh |
| 21 July | Tucson | United States | Tucson Community Center | 10,875 / 10,875 | $108,750 | Etta James |
| 23 July | Anaheim | United States | Anaheim Stadium | —N/a | | Outlaws, Etta James, Peter Tosh |
| 24 July | Anaheim | United States | Anaheim Stadium | —N/a | | Outlaws, Etta James, Peter Tosh |
| 26 July (Note: The concert on 26 July was a part of Day on the Green.) | Oakland | United States | Oakland–Alameda County Coliseum | 60,000 / 60,000 | $750,000 | Santana; Eddie Money; Peter Tosh |
| TOTAL | | | | 359,779 | $4,268,911 | |

== See also ==
- Live in Texas '78, documentary film about the recording of tour
