= Shine a Light (Rolling Stones album) =

Live album by the Rolling Stones
- Released: 1 April 2008
- Recorded: 29 October and 1 November 2006,
- Venues: Beacon Theatre, New York City, United States
- Genre: Rock
- Length: 101:12
- Label: Polydor
- Director: Martin Scorsese
- Producers: The Glimmer Twins, Bob Clearmountain

The Rolling Stones chronology
Rarities 1971–2003 (2005)	Shine a Light (2008)	The Rolling Stones Box Set (2010)

Professional ratings
Review scores
Source	Rating
AllMusic	3/5 stars
PopMatters	8/10
Q	4/5 stars
Rolling Stone	4/5 stars
Tom Hull	B

Shine a Light is the soundtrack to the Rolling Stones' concert film of the same name, directed by Martin Scorsese. It was released on 1 April 2008 in the UK by Polydor Records and one week later in the United States by Interscope Records. Double disc and single disc versions were issued.

== History ==
Shine a Light is the 10th concert album released by the Rolling Stones. Like the two 2006 shows from which it was culled, it features no songs from their 2005 album A Bigger Bang. The two-disc version features all but two of the songs played on the two nights; the missing numbers are "Undercover of the Night" (included as a bonus track on the Japanese edition and as a download on iTunes Store) and "Honky Tonk Women".

Shine a Light features guest musicians Jack White on "Loving Cup", Christina Aguilera on "Live with Me" and Buddy Guy on "Champagne and Reefer".

The album was well-received, especially in the UK, where it debuted at No. 2, selling 23,013 copies in its first week – the best chart position for a Rolling Stones concert album since Get Yer Ya-Ya's Out! in 1970. In the United States, it debuted at No. 11 on the Billboard charts with 37,117 copies sold – the band's highest US debut for a concert album since 1995's Stripped.

== Reception ==
"Maybe they've been fired up by Scorsese's fan worship, or it's simple professional pride," wrote Mark Blake in Q, "but everyone seems to have raised their game. In an era when a Rolling Stones live show can sometimes become a pantomime, Shine a Light is closer to a proper rock 'n' roll circus."

"Buddy Guy was incredible," remarked Charlie Watts. "Jack White was great. And I thought Christina Aguilera was amazing, because often those girls freeze when they dance with Mick. We've had some great people – including our dear Amy [Winehouse], although I don't think she was quite well – who were never as good as Christina."

== Track listing ==
All songs by Mick Jagger and Keith Richards, except where noted.

=== Double-disc edition ===
Disc one
No.	Title	Writer(s)	Length
1.	"Jumpin' Jack Flash"		4:23
2.	"Shattered"		4:06
3.	"She Was Hot"		4:44
4.	"All Down the Line"		4:35
5.	"Loving Cup" (with Jack White)		4:02
6.	"As Tears Go By"	Jagger; Richards; Andrew Loog Oldham	3:32
7.	"Some Girls"		4:19
8.	"Just My Imagination"	Norman Whitfield; Barrett Strong	6:39
9.	"Far Away Eyes"		4:37
10.	"Champagne and Reefer" (with Buddy Guy)	Muddy Waters	5:58
11.	"Tumbling Dice"		4:24
12.	"Band introductions"		1:39
13.	"You Got the Silver"		3:22
14.	"Connection"		3:31

Disc two
No.	Title	Length
1.	"Martin Scorsese introduction"	0:12
2.	"Sympathy for the Devil"	5:56
3.	"Live with Me" (with Christina Aguilera)	3:54
4.	"Start Me Up"	4:05
5.	"Brown Sugar"	5:25
6.	"(I Can't Get No) Satisfaction"	5:37
7.	"Paint It Black"	4:28
8.	"Little T&A"	3:31
9.	"I'm Free"	4:37
10.	"Shine a Light"	4:05

Japanese and iTunes Store edition bonus track
No.	Title	Length
1.	"Undercover of the Night"	4:24

=== Single-disc edition ===
Disc one
No.	Title	Writer(s)	Length
1.	"Jumpin' Jack Flash"		4:23
2.	"Shattered"		4:06
3.	"She Was Hot"		4:44
4.	"All Down the Line"		4:35
5.	"Loving Cup" (with Jack White)		4:02
6.	"As Tears Go By"	Jagger; Richards; Andrew Loog Oldham	3:32
7.	"Some Girls"		4:19
8.	"Just My Imagination"	Norman Whitfield; Barrett Strong	6:39
9.	"Far Away Eyes"		4:37
10.	"Champagne and Reefer" (with Buddy Guy)	Muddy Waters	5:58
11.	"Band introductions"		1:39
12.	"You Got the Silver"		3:22
13.	"Connection"		3:31
14.	"Sympathy for the Devil"		5:56
15.	"Live with Me" (with Christina Aguilera)		3:54
16.	"Start Me Up"		4:05
17.	"Brown Sugar"		5:25

== Personnel ==
The Rolling Stones

- Mick Jagger – lead vocals, guitar, harmonica
- Keith Richards – guitar, backing vocals on "Far Away Eyes" and "I'm Free", lead vocals on "You Got The Silver", "Connection" and "Little T&A"
- Ron Wood – guitar, pedal steel guitar on "Far Away Eyes"
- Charlie Watts – drums

Additional musicians

- Darryl Jones – bass guitar
- Christina Aguilera – vocals on "Live with Me"
- Buddy Guy – guitar and vocals on "Champagne and Reefer"
- Jack White – guitar and vocals on "Loving Cup"
- Chuck Leavell – keyboards, backing vocals
- Lisa Fischer – backing vocals
- Bernard Fowler – backing vocals, percussion
- Blondie Chaplin – backing vocals, percussion, acoustic guitar
- Bobby Keys – saxophone
- Michael Davis – trombone
- Kent Smith – trumpet
- Tim Ries – saxophone, keyboards

== Charts ==
=== Weekly charts ===
Weekly chart performance for Shine a Light
Chart (2008)	Peak position
Australian Albums (ARIA)	28
Austrian Albums (Ö3 Austria)	3
Belgian Albums (Ultratop Flanders)	12
Belgian Albums (Ultratop Wallonia)	42
Canadian Albums (Billboard)	9
Danish Albums (Hitlisten)	7
Dutch Albums (Album Top 100)	7
Finnish Albums (Suomen virallinen lista)	30
French Albums (SNEP)	27
German Albums (Offizielle Top 100)	7
Hungarian Albums (MAHASZ)	19
Irish Albums (IRMA)	10
Italian Albums (FIMI)	10
Japanese Albums (Oricon)	10
New Zealand Albums (RMNZ)	18
Norwegian Albums (VG-lista)	10
Portuguese Albums (AFP)	9
Scottish Albums (Official Charts)	4
Spanish Albums (Promusicae)	24
Swedish Albums (Sverigetopplistan)	6
Swiss Albums (Schweizer Hitparade)	16
UK Albums (Official Charts)	2
US Billboard 200	11
US Top Rock Albums (Billboard)	4
US Indie Store Album Sales (Billboard)	6

=== Year-end charts ===
Year-end chart performance for Shine a Light
Chart (2008)	Position
Austrian Albums (Ö3 Austria)	68

== Certifications ==
Certifications for Shine a Light
Region	Certification	Certified units/sales
Poland (ZPAV)	Gold	10,000^{*}
United Kingdom (BPI)	Gold	100,000^{^}
^{*} Sales figures based on certification alone.^{^} Shipments figures based on certification alone.
