= Shine a Light (film) =

2008 documentary film directed by Martin Scorsese

- Theatrical release poster
- Directed by: Martin Scorsese
- Produced by: Steve Bing; Michael Cohl
- Starring: Mick Jagger; Keith Richards; Charlie Watts; Ronnie Wood; Christina Aguilera; Buddy Guy; Jack White III
- Cinematography: Robert Richardson
- Music by: The Rolling Stones
- Production companies: Shangri-La Entertainment; Concert Productions International
- Distributed by: Paramount Classics (United States); 20th Century Fox (United Kingdom, Australia and New Zealand); Fortissimo Films (International)
- Release date: April 4, 2008
- Running time: 122 minutes
- Countries: United States; United Kingdom
- Language: English
- Budget: $1 million
- Box office: $16.2 million

Shine a Light is a 2008 concert film directed by Martin Scorsese documenting the Rolling Stones' 2006 Beacon Theatre performances during their A Bigger Bang Tour. The film also includes archive footage from the band's career and makes use of digital cinematography for backstage sequences, the first time Scorsese used the technology in a film. The film takes its title from the song of the same name, featured on the band's 1972 album Exile on Main St. A soundtrack album was released in April 2008 on the Universal label. It is the final film to be distributed by Paramount Classics, as the company subsequently merged into its sister company Paramount Vantage.

== Production ==
Martin Scorsese filmed the Rolling Stones at the Beacon Theatre on October 29 and November 1, 2006, but the performance footage used in the film is all from the second show. The music was recorded, mixed and co-produced by Bob Clearmountain. The audio recording was done on the Silver Truck with David Hewitt. The concert footage is preceded by a brief semi-fictionalized introduction about the preparations for the shows, and is intercut with historical news clips and archival interviews with band members.

The shows, which were added to the tour schedule for the purposes of the film shoot, featured a different set list than was typical of other shows on the tour (see below), and were noted for their star-studded crowds, including former United States President Bill Clinton and his wife, Hillary Clinton, who was then a United States senator, and former President of Poland Aleksander Kwasniewski.

The performances benefitted the Clinton Foundation, a charity founded by Bill Clinton, who gave a short speech at the October 29 performance. The film also shows Jack White, Buddy Guy and Christina Aguilera performing with the Stones.

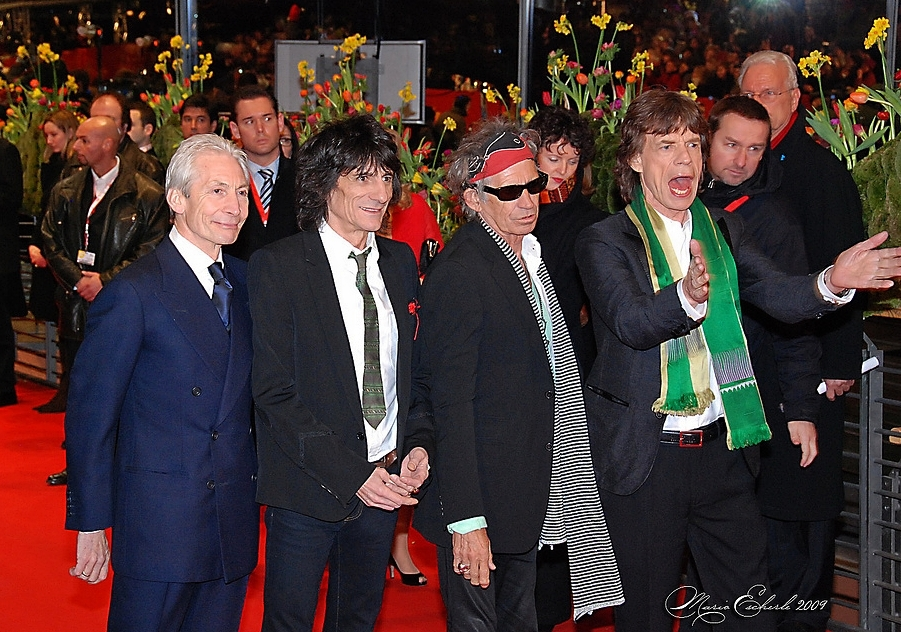
The Rolling Stones (from left to right: Charlie Watts, Ron Wood, Keith Richards, Mick Jagger) at the Berlin Film Festival (Filmfestspiele Berlin/Berlinale) in 2008 for the world premiere of the concert documentary.

Prior to the October 29 show, 83-year-old Ahmet Ertegun, a co-founder and executive of Atlantic Records and chairman of the Rock and Roll Hall of Fame and museum, was backstage in a VIP social area, the "Rattlesnake Inn," when he tripped and fell, striking his head on the concrete floor. He was rushed to the hospital, and died on December 14, 2006. The film was dedicated to his memory.

According to keyboardist Chuck Leavell's tour diary, Mick Jagger had been ill with throat problems, forcing a postponement of the Stones scheduled Atlantic City concert and the October 31 Beacon Theatre show was moved to November 1, to allow Jagger to recuperate.

Worthy of note is lyrics omitted from "Sympathy for the Devil." Perhaps due to Clinton's presence, Jagger does not sing, "I shouted out, who killed the Kennedys? When after all, it was you and me."

== Performances ==
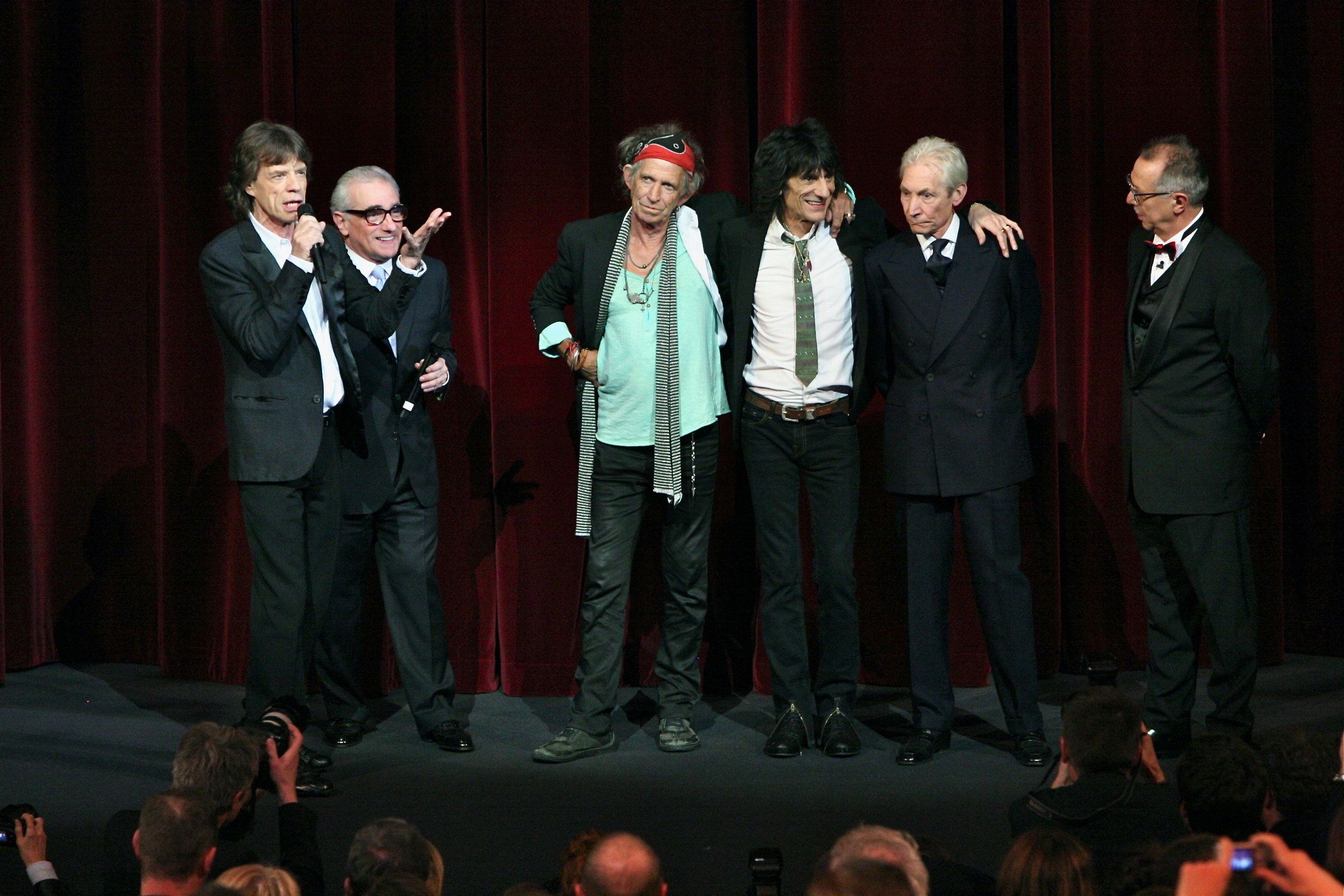
From left to right: Mick Jagger, Martin Scorsese, Keith Richards, Ron Wood, Charlie Watts and Berlinale director Dieter Kosslick before the world premiere of Shine a Light.

Most of the performance footage was culled from the second night of filming. "The first night we had Bill Clinton there," Charlie Watts recalled. "I don't know why the Clinton bit's in the movie... That was a bit dull, because they weren't really rock 'n' roll people. But Mick was on fire. You can tell in the third song when Lisa Fisher (sic), the singer, does a shimmy with him and you see the look on her face. He dances like Fred Astaire, going backwards."

All tracks are by Mick Jagger and Keith Richards, except where noted.

1. "Jumpin' Jack Flash"
2. "Shattered"
3. "She Was Hot"
4. "All Down the Line"
5. "Loving Cup" – with Jack White
6. "As Tears Go By" (Jagger/Richards/Oldham)
7. "Some Girls"
8. "Just My Imagination" (Norman Whitfield/Barrett Strong)
9. "Far Away Eyes"
10. "Champagne & Reefer" (Muddy Waters) – with Buddy Guy; Richards can be seen giving his guitar to Guy when the song ends.
11. "Tumbling Dice" (followed by band introductions)
12. "You Got the Silver"
13. "Connection" (incomplete/cut with 1999 interview clips)
14. "Sympathy for the Devil"
15. "Live with Me" – with Christina Aguilera
16. "Start Me Up"
17. "Brown Sugar"
18. "(I Can't Get No) Satisfaction"
19. "Shine a Light" (incomplete; audio only)

Additional acoustic instrumental numbers are also played during the closing credits:

- "Wild Horses"
- "Only Found Out Yesterday" (Richards)

Noting the director's frequent use of Stones music in his films, Jagger joked that Shine a Light may be the only Scorsese film that does not include "Gimme Shelter".

== Release ==
=== Theaters ===
Shine a Light was initially scheduled for release on September 21, 2007, but Paramount Classics postponed it until April 2008. The world premiere was at the 58th Berlin International Film Festival on February 7, 2008. The film was also screened in some IMAX cinemas. The IMAX version of the film was the second IMAX Stones concert film, the first being Live at the Max, released in 1991.

=== Home media ===
From Paramount Home Entertainment, Shine a Light was released on DVD and Blu-ray July 29, 2008.

Bonus features:

- A "featurette" with backstage and rehearsal footage
- "Undercover of the Night"
- "Paint It Black" (mistitled "Black" on some editions)
- "Little T&A" (mistitled "She's my little rock and roll" on some editions)
- "I'm Free" (mistitled "Free to do what I want" on some editions)

== Reception ==
=== Box office ===
Shine a Light grossed $5.5 million in the United States and Canada and $10.7 million in other territories for a worldwide total of $16.2 million, against a production budget of $1 million.

=== Critical response ===
Shine a Light received mostly positive reviews from critics. On the review aggregator website Rotten Tomatoes, 85% of 124 critics' reviews are positive, with an average rating of 7.3/10. The website's consensus reads: "It may offer little new for fans, but Martin Scorsese's document of the Rolling Stones' electrifying live show should provide satisfaction to audiences." On Metacritic, which uses a weighted average, the film has an average score of 76 out of 100 based on 36 critics, indicating "generally favorable reviews".

The Telegraph considered Shine a Light to be "Scorsese's tribute to the music that has shaped his career", noting its departure from the "trappings" of traditional documentary filmmaking to instead focus on capturing "the essence of the Rolling Stones, namely, their live performance." The paper considered the film "electric", referencing its near universal acclaim at its Berlin Film Festival debut.
