= The Rolling Stones Box Set =

Box set by The Rolling Stones
- Released: 17 May 2010
- Recorded: 1970–2005
- Genre: Rock
- Label: Polydor

The Rolling Stones chronology
Shine a Light (2008)	The Rolling Stones Box Set (2010)	The Singles 1971–2006 (2011)

The Rolling Stones Box Set comprises all 14 post-1970 studio albums released by the Rolling Stones. It includes the single disc version of Exile on Main St..

== Albums ==
- All studio albums currently available in the box set. Titles 1–11 released on Rolling Stones Records and titles 12–14 released on Virgin Records.
1. Sticky Fingers (1971)
2. Exile on Main St. (1972)
3. Goats Head Soup (1973)
4. It's Only Rock 'n Roll (1974)
5. Black and Blue (1976)
6. Some Girls (1978)
7. Emotional Rescue (1980)
8. Tattoo You (1981)
9. Undercover (1983)
10. Dirty Work (1986)
11. Steel Wheels (1989)
12. Voodoo Lounge (1994)
13. Bridges to Babylon (1997)
14. A Bigger Bang (2005)
