= Blue Blazes (album) =

Studio album by Sugar Blue
- Released: 1994
- Genre: Blues
- Label: Alligator
- Producer: Sugar Blue, Fred Breitberg

Sugar Blue chronology
| Absolutely Blue (1991) | Blue Blazes (1994) | In Your Eyes (1995) |

Blue Blazes is an album by the American musician Sugar Blue, released in 1994. Alligator Records secured the rights to the album from the Japanese King label. Blue supported the album with a North American tour.

== Production ==
The album was coproduced by Fred Breitberg. Blue was left alone in the studio to record the album he wanted. He typically played his harmonica solos without any vibrato. Lurrie Bell accompanied Blue on acoustic guitar on the cover of Jimmy Rogers' "That's All Right". The Chicago Horns appeared on a couple of tracks. "Miss You" is a cover of the Rolling Stones song; Blue played on the original track. "Back Door Man" was written by Willie Dixon. "Help Me" is a version of the Sonny Boy Williamson II song. "I Ain't Got You" is a cover of the Billy Boy Arnold single. "Country Blues" and "Out Till Dawn" were cowritten by Blue; they were influenced by his appreciation of country music.

== Critical reception ==
Professional ratings
Review scores
| Source | Rating |
|---|---|
| AllMusic | 4/5 stars |
| Edmonton Journal | 2.5/4 stars |
| MusicHound Blues: The Essential Album Guide | 3.5/5 stars |
| The Penguin Guide to Blues Recordings | 2/4 stars |
| Pittsburgh Post-Gazette | 3/4 stars |
| The Press of Atlantic City | 2.5/4 stars |
| Tri-City Herald | 3.5/5 stars |

The Edmonton Journal wrote that Blue "does blow a powerful, wailing harp sound tune after hopping tune." The Pittsburgh Post-Gazette said that "Blue's smoky, passionate vocals can be just as torchy or tough, a fine complement to his harp." The Washington Post noted that, "when the music is moody, it often a conjures a familiar shade of blues... And when the music is hot, it's ablaze alright, fueled by the sort of incendiary, upper-register runs that ignite the solo on 'Out Till Dawn'." The Boston Globe stated that "few blues artists in recent years have come up with a sound this personable and recognizable, or pushed the frontiers of their instrument this far."

The Press of Atlantic City deemed the album "both old and new, uptown and down-home" with "a solid rock flavoring." The Journal & Courier called it "typical Alligator Records fare—substantial, if not a little slick." The Austin American-Statesman opined that "guitarist Motaoki Makino is especially sharp." The Detroit Free Press wrote that Blue's "sexy blues vocals are driven by some of the sweetest high-end harmonica around."

AllMusic determined that "harmonica player and vocalist Sugar Blue isn't a singer who doubles on harp; he's an extraordinary instrumentalist who's also a quality vocalist."

== Track listing ==
| No. | Title | Length |
|---|---|---|
| 1. | "I Ain't Got You" |
| 2. | "Help Me" |
| 3. | "Miss You" |
| 4. | "I Just Got to Know" |
| 5. | "One More Mile to Go" |
| 6. | "That's All Right" |
| 7. | "Country Blues" |
| 8. | "Back Door Man" |
| 9. | "Just to Be with You" |
| 10. | "Out Till Dawn" |
