= Lies (Rolling Stones song) =

Song by the Rolling Stones

from the album Some Girls
- Released: 9 June 1978
- Recorded: 10 October – 21 December 1977; Pathé Marconi Studios, Paris
- Genre: Punk rock
- Length: 3:28
- Label: Rolling Stones/Virgin
- Songwriter: Jagger/Richards
- Producer: The Glimmer Twins

Some Girls track listing
- 10 tracks Side one: 1. "Miss You"; 2. "When the Whip Comes Down"; 3. "Just My Imagination (Running Away with Me)"; 4. "Some Girls"; 5. "Lies"; Side two: 6. "Far Away Eyes"; 7. "Respectable"; 8. "Before They Make Me Run"; 9. "Beast of Burden"; 10. "Shattered"

"Lies" is a song by the English rock band the Rolling Stones from their 1978 album Some Girls.

The song is a fast-paced rocker is about a man being fed up with his girlfriend's lying and cheating. As with most of Some Girls, it features the five core Stones members, with Jagger, Richards and Ronnie Wood sharing electric guitar duties.

== Personnel ==
According to the authors Philippe Margotin and Jean-Michel Guesdon.

The Rolling Stones

- Mick Jagger – vocals, rhythm guitar
- Keith Richards – rhythm guitar
- Ronnie Wood – rhythm and lead guitar
- Bill Wyman – bass guitar
- Charlie Watts – drums

Technical

- The Glimmer Twins – producers
- Chris Kimsey – engineer
- Barry Sage – assistant engineer
- Ben King – assistant engineer

Note: Margotin and Guesdon are unsure if Richards and Wood sung backing vocals.

== Use in television ==
The track was featured on WKRP in Cincinnati on the episode "Pilot: Part Two". However, "Lies", although performed during the 1978 US tour, was the only track on Some Girls to be permanently dropped from live setlists after the last dates supporting its parent album.
