= Zip Code (tour) =

2015 concert tour by the Rolling Stones

- Continental tour by The Rolling Stones
- Promotional poster for the tour
- Location: North America
- Associated album: Sticky Fingers (deluxe edition)
- Start date: 20 May 2015
- End date: 15 July 2015
- Legs: 1
- No. of shows: 17
- Box office: $109.7 million ($149 million in 2025 dollars)

The Rolling Stones concert chronology
- 14 On Fire (2014); Zip Code (2015); América Latina Olé (2016)

Zip Code was a concert tour by English rock band the Rolling Stones. It began on 24 May 2015 in San Diego and travelled across North America before concluding on 15 July 2015 in Quebec City. The tour was announced on 31 March 2015 with tickets going on sale to the general public two weeks later. The name is a reference to the jeans-related artwork for Sticky Fingers, which received a special re-release in 2015, and had its entire track list played during the Zip Code Tour.

== History ==
On 31 March 2015, the Rolling Stones announced the Zip Code tour, a new United States & Canada tour subtitled Tour of North America 2015. The tour featured stadium concerts after extensive usage of said venues during the 14 On Fire European tour. Mick Jagger had declared that the band would extend the tour to South America "but it's kind of difficult to put together." Given the tour started the same year the Sticky Fingers album received a deluxe re-release, "Zip Code" is a reference to how that album's cover features the crotch of a man wearing jeans, which in the original vinyl release had a working zipper.

On 20 May 2015, the Rolling Stones performed a surprise L.A. concert at The Fonda Theatre (an intimate 1,300-person-capacity venue) in Hollywood, California, playing sixteen songs in total, including the entire ten-song track list of Sticky Fingers. The show was filmed and later released on Blu-Ray, DVD, CD and LP.

On 27 May 2015, the Rolling Stones performed a private show at Belly Up Tavern, Solana Beach, California, playing a shorter set of fifteen songs. The Stones played the Indianapolis Motor Speedway on The Fourth of July. The concert included a massive fireworks display.

== Set list ==
This set list is representative of the performance on 9 June 2015. It does not represent all concerts for the duration of the tour.

1. "Start Me Up"
2. "It's Only Rock 'n Roll (But I Like It)"
3. "All Down the Line"
4. "Tumbling Dice"
5. "Doom and Gloom"
6. "Can't You Hear Me Knocking"
7. "You Gotta Move"
8. "Some Girls"
9. "Honky Tonk Women"
10. "Before They Make Me Run"
11. "Happy"
12. "Midnight Rambler"
13. "Miss You"
14. "Gimme Shelter"
15. "Jumpin' Jack Flash"
16. "Sympathy for the Devil"
17. "Brown Sugar"
  Encore
18. "You Can't Always Get What You Want"
19. "(I Can't Get No) Satisfaction"

== Tour dates ==
List of 2015 concerts
Date	City	Country	Venue	Opening act(s)	Attendance	Revenue
20 May	Los Angeles	United States	Fonda Theatre	—N/a	—N/a	—N/a
24 May	San Diego	United States	Petco Park	Gary Clark Jr.	40,944 / 40,944	$8,465,082
27 May	Solana Beach	United States	Belly Up Tavern	—N/a	—N/a	—N/a
30 May	Columbus	United States	Ohio Stadium	Kid Rock	59,038 / 59,038	$7,911,843
3 June	Minneapolis	United States	TCF Bank Stadium	Grace Potter	41,517 / 41,517	$8,328,199
6 June	Arlington	United States	AT&T Stadium	Grace Potter	47,535 / 47,535	$9,294,552
9 June	Atlanta	United States	Bobby Dodd Stadium	St. Paul & the Broken Bones	42,320 / 42,320	$7,625,554
12 June	Orlando	United States	Orlando Citrus Bowl	The Temperance Movement	47,262 / 47,262	$9,367,879
17 June	Nashville	United States	LP Field	Brad Paisley	47,242 / 47,242	$8,416,049
20 June	Pittsburgh	United States	Heinz Field	Awolnation	54,136 / 54,136	$9,125,120
23 June (Note: The 23 June 2015 concert in Milwaukee, United States is a part of the 2015 Summerfest.)	Milwaukee	United States	Marcus Amphitheater	Buddy Guy	22,545 / 22,545	$4,939,823
27 June	Kansas City	United States	Arrowhead Stadium	Ed Sheeran	49,502 / 49,502	$7,187,255
1 July	Raleigh	United States	Carter–Finley Stadium	Avett Brothers	40,428 / 40,428	$7,947,996
4 July	Speedway (Note: Labelled as Indianapolis in promotional material.)	United States	Indianapolis Motor Speedway	Rascal Flatts; Saints of Valory	50,000 / 50,000	$6,187,966
8 July	Detroit	United States	Comerica Park	Walk the Moon	36,712 / 36,712	$6,282,151
11 July	Orchard Park	United States	Ralph Wilson Stadium	St. Paul & The Broken Bones	49,552 / 49,552	$8,634,557
15 July (Note: The 15 July 2015 concert in Quebec City, Canada is a part of the 2015 Quebec City Summer Festival.)	Quebec City	Canada	Plains of Abraham	—N/a	102,000 / 102,000	—N/a
Total					730,733 / 730,733	$109,714,026

== Personnel ==
=== The Rolling Stones ===
- Mick Jagger – lead vocals, rhythm guitar, harmonica, percussion
- Keith Richards – rhythm and lead guitars, backing vocals
- Charlie Watts – drums
- Ronnie Wood – lead and rhythm guitars

=== Additional musicians ===
- Darryl Jones – bass guitar, backing vocals
- Chuck Leavell – keyboards, backing vocals
- Lisa Fischer – backing vocals, percussion
- Karl Denson – saxophone
- Tim Ries – saxophone, keyboards
- Matt Clifford – French horn, show introduction voice
- Bernard Fowler – backing vocals, percussion

== See also ==
- The Rolling Stones concerts
