= No Spare Parts =

Single by The Rolling Stones

from the album Some Girls (reissue)
- B-side: "Before They Make Me Run"
- Released: 13 November 2011
- Recorded: 10 October – 21 December 1977; Pathé Marconi Studios, Paris; 2011
- Genre: Rock, country rock
- Length: 4:30
- Label: Universal Music
- Songwriter(s): Jagger/Richards
- Producer(s): The Glimmer Twins

The Rolling Stones singles chronology
| "Plundered My Soul" (2010) | "No Spare Parts" (2011) | "Doom and Gloom" (2012) |

"No Spare Parts" is a song by the English rock band the Rolling Stones, featured as a bonus track on the 2011 re-release of their 1978 album Some Girls. It is one of twelve previously unreleased songs that appear on the reissue, and features newly recorded vocals from Mick Jagger. The song reached number 2 on Billboard's Hot Singles chart.

A music video for the song was released on 19 December 2011 and was directed by Mat Whitecross.

== Personnel ==
- Mick Jagger – vocals, electric piano, percussion
- Ronnie Wood – pedal steel guitar
- Keith Richards – acoustic guitar, piano, background vocals
- Bill Wyman – bass guitar
- Charlie Watts – drums
