= I Don't Trust Myself =

I Don't Trust Myself may refer to:

- "I Don't Trust Myself", a song by Sara Evans from the album Words
- "I Don't Trust Myself", a song by Willie Dixon from the album Hidden Charms
- "I Don't Trust Myself (With Loving You)", a song by John Mayer from the album Continuum
