= Sugar Blue =

American blues harmonica player (born 1949)

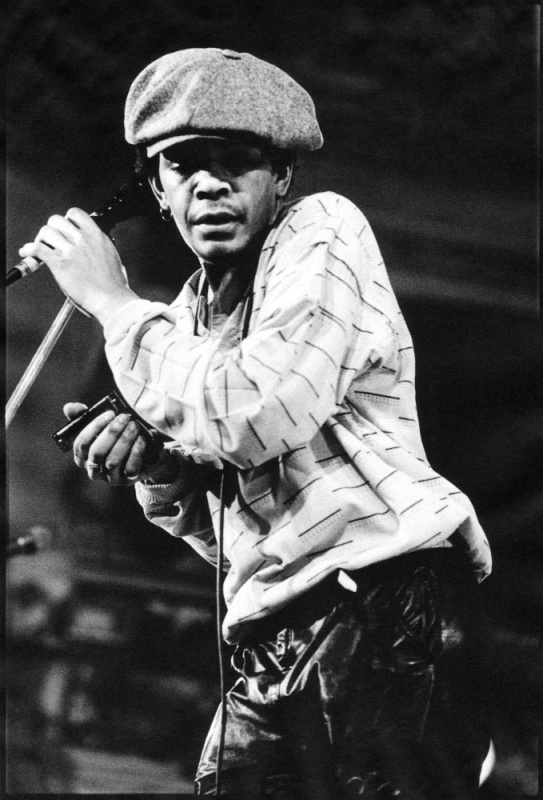
- Blue at the Lucerna Music Bar, Prague, 1988

Background information
- Born: James Joshua Whiting; December 16, 1949 (age 75); New York City, U.S.
- Genres: Blues; rock
- Occupations: Musician; singer; songwriter
- Instruments: Harmonica; vocals
- Years active: Late 1960s–present
- Website: www.sugar-blue.com

James Joshua Whiting (born December 16, 1949), known professionally as Sugar Blue, is an American blues harmonica player. He is best known for playing on the 1978 Rolling Stones album Some Girls, and well as his partnership with blues guitarist Louisiana Red.

The Chicago Tribune said, "The sound of Sugar Blue's harmonica could pierce any night...it's the sound of a musician who transcends the supposed limitations of his instrument."

== Biography ==
Whiting was born in New York City in 1949. In the mid-1970s, Whiting played as a session musician on Johnny Shines's Too Wet to Plow (1975) and with Roosevelt Sykes. While in the company of the latter, he met Louisiana Red, and the two toured and recorded in 1978.

Taking advice from Memphis Slim, in the late 1970s Whiting traveled to Paris, France. According to Ronnie Wood, Whiting was found by Mick Jagger busking on the city streets. This led to him playing on several of the tracks on the Rolling Stones' Some Girls and Emotional Rescue albums: "Some Girls", "Send It to Me", "Down in the Hole" and "Miss You".

Trombonist Mike Zwerin backed Whiting on his solo debut album, Crossroads (1979). Following the release of his From Chicago to Paris (1982), Whiting joined Willie Dixon's Chicago Blues All Stars. In 1984, Whiting's track "Another Man Done Gone", appeared on the compilation album Blues Explosion. It won a Grammy in 1985 for Best Traditional Blues Album.

Whiting appeared with Brownie McGhee in the film Angel Heart (1987).

Whiting joined as a side musician recording with Willie Dixon on the Grammy Award winning album, Hidden Charms (1988).

His next album, Blue Blazes, was released in 1994 and it included his version of "Miss You". It was followed by In Your Eyes (1995) and Code Blue (2007).

He played on the album Down Too Long, by Southside Denny and the Skintones, in 1988. Whiting's next album, Threshold, was released by Beeble Music on January 26, 2010.

Writing in the Chicago Tribune, music critic Howard Reich said, "There's no mistaking Sugar Blue incendiary virtuosity. The speed and ferocity of his playing are matched by its inventiveness, with Blue packing nearly every phrase with trills, glissandos, clusters and chords. At times, it sounds as if two harps were working at once... intense, melodically ornate, punctuated by growls and swooping pitches, it's the sound of a musician who transcends the limitations of his instrument."

== Discography ==
=== Albums ===
Year	Title	Label	Number	Notes
1978	Red, Funk and Blue	Black Panther	BP-1001	Duo with Louisiana Red
1979	King Bee	JSP	1006	Duo with Louisiana Red
1980	Crossroads	Blue Silver	BS-3004	France; recorded 1979
1982	From Chicago to Paris	Blue Silver	BS-3012, BS-3332	France; recorded 1980 with Slim Pezin, Earl Howell
1984	High Voltage Blues	JSP	1081	with Louisiana Red
1988	Hidden Charms	Capitol	90595	As sideman with Willie Dixon
1993	Absolutely Blue	Seven Seas/King	KICP-341	Japan, recorded 1982
1994	Blue Blazes	Alligator	AL-4819	Reissue of Absolutely Blue
1995	In Your Eyes	Seven Seas/King; Alligator	KICP-426; AL-4831	
2006	Right Now	Kozel		Switzerland; George Kay Band featuring Sugar Blue
2007	Code Blue	Beeble	801	
2010	Threshold	Beeble	802	
2012	Raw Sugar - Live	Beeble	803	
2016	Blue Voyage	M.C. Records	0079	
2019	Colors	Beeble	805	

=== Compilations and reissues ===
Year	Title	Label	Number	Notes
1979	Stars of the Streets	Whale Productions / Egg Records (France)	Egg 900582 Compilation	Performances of several street musicians were recorded live outdoors in the streets and parks of New York City. Track 1 : "Pontiac Blues" by Sugar Blue
1980	Jazz Gala '80	Kingdom Jazz	Gate 7010	Recorded at the Palm Beach Casino, Cannes, France
1984	Blues Explosion (various artists)	Atlantic	80149	Grammy winner; recorded live at Montreux, July 1982
1992	From Paris to Chicago	EPM Blues Collection	756	Reissue of Crossroads and From Chicago to Paris
1998	The Blues Spectrum of Louisiana Red	JSP	803	UK recording
2007	Another Man Done Gone	WNTS/Believe Digital	MP3 download	Reissue of Crossroads and From Chicago to Paris

== See also ==
- List of harmonica blues musicians
- List of Chicago blues musicians
- List of contemporary blues musicians
- List of harmonicists
