= Some Girls (Rolling Stones song) =

Song by the Rolling Stones

from the album Some Girls
- Released: 9 June 1978
- Recorded: 10 October – 21 December 1977
- Studio: Pathé-Marconi, Paris
- Genre: Rock: Blues rock
- Length: 4:37
- Label: Rolling Stones; Virgin
- Songwriter: Jagger/Richards
- Producer: The Glimmer Twins

Some Girls track listing
- 10 tracks Side one: 1. "Miss You"; 2. "When the Whip Comes Down"; 3. "Just My Imagination (Running Away with Me)"; 4. "Some Girls"; 5. "Lies"; Side two: 6. "Far Away Eyes"; 7. "Respectable"; 8. "Before They Make Me Run"; 9. "Beast of Burden"; 10. "Shattered"

"Some Girls" is the title track of the English rock band the Rolling Stones' 1978 album Some Girls. It marked the third time a song on one of the band's albums also served as the album's title.

== Inspiration ==
In a 1978 interview, Jagger spoke at length about the song and its inspiration :

"It was just a joke. The thing was that I was with these two black ladies from Africa and we were in Paris recording, and I was in the studio with these black girls and we'd been up all night. We'd been making love all night long. I came to the studio completely tired and they knew it, and they were giggling at me. And that song I made up on the spur of the moment. I mean, it sounds a bit like it, to be honest. I went on for 11 minutes originally and I was just making up lines. You know, the funniest lines I could come up with. You can go on forever - 'Some girls like to do this, some girls like to do that.' And I just turned around and said, "Black girls just want to get fucked all night/ I just don't have that much jam" and they all giggled. It was just for them. You know, white girls don't come off so well, either. It really was just a joke."

== Lyrics ==
Like "Under My Thumb", "Brown Sugar", and "Star Star", the lyrics to "Some Girls" created controversy because of the way it depicted women. The line "black girls just want to get fucked all night" was the most controversial. In its review of the album, Rolling Stone writer Paul Nelson called it "...a sexist and racist horror..." but added "...it's also terrifically funny and strangely desperate in a manner that gets under your skin and makes you care."

Civil rights leader Jesse Jackson met with Ahmet Ertegun, chair of the board of Atlantic Records (the record's distributor). The record company refused to edit the song for future releases and the band issued a statement saying the lyrics actually mocked stereotypical feelings towards women. Ertegun said: "Mick assured me that it was a parody of the type of people who hold these attitudes. Mick has great respect for blacks. He owes his whole being, his whole musical career, to black people" and the band-issued statement declared "It never occurred to us that our parody of certain stereotypical attitudes would be taken seriously by anyone who heard the entire lyric of the song in question. No insult was intended, and if any was taken, we sincerely apologize."

Humorously, Saturday Night Live cast member Garrett Morris commented on the controversy with a mock-editorial on the show's Weekend Update segment: After giving the impression that he was going to openly criticize the Stones, he quoted a sanitized version of the "Black girls just..." line, then stated, "Now, Mr. Jagger, there is only one question I want to ask you – Jaggs. And you better have the answer, man, you better have the answer, since you have besmirched the character of black women. Therefore, here is my question, Jaggs. Where are all of these black broads, man? Hey, like, where ARE they, baby? You got any phone numbers for me, baby? Please send 'em to me. Thank you."

When the Stones performed the song in Martin Scorsese's 2008 film Shine a Light, however, the line was not included.

== Live Performances ==
The song was not performed live until 1999 on the band's No Security tour. It was last played in 2015 during the Zip Code tour.

== Personnel ==
Personnel taken from the Some Girls CD credits and the authors Philippe Margotin and Jean-Michel Guesdon.

The Rolling Stones

- Mick Jagger – lead and backing vocals, rhythm guitar
- Keith Richards – rhythm and lead guitar, bass guitar, backing vocals
- Ronnie Wood – rhythm and lead guitars, backing vocals
- Bill Wyman – synthesiser
- Charlie Watts – drums

Additional personnel

- Sugar Blue – harmonica

Technical

- The Glimmer Twins – producers
- Chris Kimsey – engineer
- Barry Sage – assistant engineer
- Ben King – assistant engineer

== See also ==
- Race (human categorization)
