= Hidden Charms (Willie Dixon album) =

Studio album by Willie Dixon
- Released: 1988
- Studios: Ocean Way, Hollywood
- Genre: Blues
- Label: Bug/Capitol
- Producer: T Bone Burnett

Willie Dixon chronology
Willie Dixon: Live (Backstage Access) (1985)	Hidden Charms (1988)	Ginger Ale Afternoon (1989)

Hidden Charms is a blues album by Willie Dixon, released in 1988 on Bug/Capitol Records. It won a 1989 Grammy Award.

== Production ==
The album was produced by T Bone Burnett. The band was made up of Cash McCall and Burnett on guitars, Sugar Blue on harmonica, Red Callender on bass, Lafayette Leake on piano, and Earl Palmer on drums. "Study War No More" was cowritten by Dixon's grandson.

== Critical reception ==
Professional ratings
Review scores
Source	Rating
AllMusic	3/5 stars
The Encyclopedia of Popular Music	3/5 stars
Orlando Sentinel	4/5 stars
The Philadelphia Inquirer	3/4 stars
The Rolling Stone Album Guide	2/5 stars

The Globe and Mail wrote that "the band is excellent - rootsy and tough but not overpowering - and, while Dixon's hardly a mesmerizing singer, his gruff grandfatherly voice has a plaintive soulfullness that suits his more recent songs." The Kingston Whig-Standard wrote that "Leake's unique playing is alone worth the price of the album."

The Rolling Stone Album Guide called the album "a solid if unspectacular outing." Paste deemed it "a collection of overlooked Dixon gems."

== Track listing ==
All tracks composed and arranged by Willie Dixon, except where indicated

1. "Blues You Can't Lose" 5:44
2. "I Don't Trust Myself" 4:23
3. "Jungle Swing" (Willie Dixon, Leonard Caston) 5:27
4. "Don't Mess with the Messer" 7:10
5. "Study War No More" (Willie Dixon, Alex Dixon) 4:33
6. "I Love the Life I Live (I Live the Life I Love)" 3:11
7. "I Cry for You" 4:40
8. "Good Advice" (Willie Dixon, J.B. Lenoir) 5:13
9. "I Do the Job" 6:22

== Personnel ==
- Willie Dixon - vocals
- Cash McCall - electric guitar, National Steel resonator guitar, harmony vocals, associate producer
- T Bone Burnett - dobro
- Red Callender - bass guitar
- Lafayette Leake - piano
- Earl Palmer - drums
- Sugar Blue - harmonica

Technical

- Rik Pekkonen - recording, mixing
- Larry Hirsch - additional engineer
- Nancy Meyer - project coordinator
- Marc Norberg - front cover portrait
