= Don't Stop (Rolling Stones song) =

Single by the Rolling Stones

from the album Forty Licks
- B-side: "Miss You" (remix)
- Released: 30 September 2002
- Recorded: May–June 2002
- Genre: Pop rock
- Length: 3:59
- Label: Rolling Stones/Virgin
- Songwriter: Jagger–Richards
- Producers: Don Was, The Glimmer Twins

The Rolling Stones singles chronology
"Out of Control" (1998)	"Don't Stop" (2002)	"Sympathy for the Devil (remix)" (2003)

"Don't Stop" is a single by rock band the Rolling Stones featured on their 2002 compilation album Forty Licks.

== History ==
Credited to singer Mick Jagger and guitarist Keith Richards, "Don't Stop" was largely the work of Jagger. Writing began during Jagger's preparations for his 2001 album Goddess in the Doorway. At the time of release, he commented: "For me, doing a solo album or a Stones album is all the same, with one proviso: that when I'm writing for the Rolling Stones I don't mind if the song sounds like the ones the Stones do, whereas if I'm writing, but not recording with the Rolling Stones, I don't want the song to contain too many of the clichés that one associates with the Rolling Stones, so I try quite hard to avoid them. Before the release of Forty Licks, I wrote "Don't Stop" in the same period that I was writing the songs for my solo album, and I just put it to one side and said to myself, 'This sounds very much like the Rolling Stones to me. It might be very useful in the coming months, but I'll leave it for now and I won't record it because I think it's going to be better for the Stones.'"

A straightforward rocker featuring a trademark opening riff from Richards, "Don't Stop" tells of a rough love affair between the singer and his lover:

The way you bit my lip and you drew first blood
It warmed my cold, cold heart
And you wrote your name right on my back
Boy, your nails were sharp

Well I'm losing you, I know your heart is miles away
There's a whisper there where once there was a storm
And all that's left is that image that I've filed away
And some memories have tattered as they've torn

=== Recording and release ===
Recording began on "Don't Stop" in the early summer of 2002 at Guillaume Tell Studios, in Suresnes, France. On the recording, Richards said at the time, "Don't Stop" is basically all Mick. He had the song when we got to Paris to record. It was a matter of me finding the guitar licks to go behind the song, rather than it just chugging along. We don't see a lot of each other. I live in America, he lives in England. So when we get together, we see what ideas each has got: 'I'm stuck on the bridge.' 'Well, I have this bit that might work.' A lot of what Mick and I do is fixing and touching up, writing the song in bits, assembling it on the spot. In "Don't Stop", my job was the fairy dust.' With Jagger on lead vocals, both Richards and Ronnie Wood accompany on guitars. "Don't Stop" is one of the many later Stones songs to feature Jagger on rhythm guitar. Wood provides the two solos near the middle and at the end. Charlie Watts plays drums, Darryl Jones bass, and Chuck Leavell on keyboards.

Released on 16 December 2002, "Don't Stop" reached No. 36 in the UK Top 75 singles chart and No. 1 on the Billboard Heritage Rock chart. The song was performed heavily during the Licks Tour of 2002–03 in support of Forty Licks, and was also included on the albums GRRR! and Honk..

== Personnel ==
Rolling Stones

- Mick Jagger: lead vocals, rhythm guitar;
- Keith Richards: rhythm guitar;
- Charlie Watts: drums;
- Ronnie Wood: lead guitar, main solo guitar;

Musicos Adicionais

- Darryl Jones: Bass guitar;
- Chuck Leavell: keyboards And backing vocals;

== Track listing ==
1. "Don't Stop" (edit) – 3:29
2. "Don't Stop" (New Rock Mix) – 4:00
3. "Miss You" (Remix) – 8:35

== Charts ==
Chart performance for "Don't Stop"
Chart (2002)	Peak position
Belgium (Ultratip Bubbling Under Wallonia)	17
Croatia (HRT)	5
France (SNEP)	97
Germany (GfK)	52
Italy (FIMI)	48
Netherlands (Single Top 100)	45
Sweden (Sverigetopplistan)	58
Switzerland (Schweizer Hitparade)	29
UK Singles (Official Charts)	36
US Heritage Rock (Billboard)	1
US Adult Alternative Airplay (Billboard)	5
US Mainstream Rock (Billboard)	21
