= Respectable (Rolling Stones song) =

Single by the Rolling Stones

from the album Some Girls
- B-side: "When the Whip Comes Down"
- Released: 15 September 1978
- Recorded: 10 October – 21 December 1977; Pathé Marconi Studios, Paris
- Genre: Punk rock, rock and roll
- Length: 3:07
- Label: Rolling Stones
- Songwriter: Jagger–Richards
- Producer: The Glimmer Twins

The Rolling Stones singles chronology
"Beast of Burden" (1978)	"Respectable" (1978)	"Shattered" (1978)

Some Girls track listing
- 10 tracks Side one: 1. "Miss You"; 2. "When the Whip Comes Down"; 3. "Just My Imagination (Running Away with Me)"; 4. "Some Girls"; 5. "Lies"; Side two: 6. "Far Away Eyes"; 7. "Respectable"; 8. "Before They Make Me Run"; 9. "Beast of Burden"; 10. "Shattered"

"Respectable" is a song by the English rock band the Rolling Stones from their 1978 album Some Girls. It was written by Mick Jagger and Keith Richards. In the liner notes to the 1993 compilation album Jump Back: The Best of The Rolling Stones (on which it was included), Jagger said, "It's important to be somewhat influenced by what's going on around you and on the Some Girls album, I think we definitely became more aggressive because of the punk thing..."

== Inspiration and recording ==
Recorded from October through December 1977, "Respectable" was originally written by Mick Jagger to be a slower song, but guitarist Richards saw the advantages of speeding up the tempo and crafting a rocker out of the song. Jagger continued in the liner notes, "On ["Respectable"] I was banging out three chords incredibly loud on the electric guitar, which isn't always a wonderful idea but was fun here. This is a punk meets Chuck Berry number..." This resulted in Jagger and Richards having arguments over the song's tempo.

The biting lyrics talk of a woman rising into high society and Jagger's attempts to remind her of where she came from. Jagger said at the time of its release, "'Respectable' really started off as a song in my head about how respectable we as a band were supposed to have become, 'We're so respectable'. As I went along with the singing, I just made things up and fit things in. Now we're respected in society... I really meant [the band]. My wife's a very honest person, and the songs's not about her... It's very rock & roll. It's not like Bob Dylan's 'Sara'. 'Respectable' is very lighthearted when you hear it. That's why I don't like divorcing the lyrics from the music. 'Cause when you actually hear it sung, it's not what it is, it's the way we do it..."

== Release and aftermath ==
"Respectable" was released as a single in the United Kingdom in 1978, where it peaked at no. 23 on the UK Singles Chart. A memorable music video, which was directed by Michael Lindsay-Hogg, was made for the single, featuring a more "punk" Stones on display. A still from this video—with departed bassist Bill Wyman edited out—was used as the cover for the band's 2005 compilation album Rarities 1971–2003. It also appeared on later compilations such as Jump Back, and GRRR!

A live version from their 1997–1998 Bridges to Babylon Tour was released on the album No Security.

The Stones were joined on stage by John Mayer to play a live version during their 50 and Counting Tour on 13 December 2012 at the Prudential Center in Newark, New Jersey.

== Charts ==
Chart (1978)	Peak position
Ireland (IRMA)	16
Netherlands (Dutch Top 40)	18
Netherlands (Single Top 100)	16
UK Singles (OCC)	23

== Personnel ==
According to the liner notes of the 2011 deluxe edition and the authors Philippe Margotin and Jean-Michel Guesdon.

The Rolling Stones

- Mick Jagger – lead vocals, rhythm guitar
- Keith Richards – rhythm and lead guitar
- Ronnie Wood – rhythm and lead guitar
- Bill Wyman – bass guitar
- Charlie Watts – drums

Technical

- The Glimmer Twins – producers
- Chris Kimsey – engineer
- Barry Sage – assistant engineer
- Ben King – assistant engineer
