= Before They Make Me Run =

Song by the Rolling Stones

from the album Some Girls
- Released: 9 June 1978
- Recorded: March 1978; Pathé Marconi Studios, Paris
- Genre: Rock and roll; hard rock
- Length: 3:25
- Label: Rolling Stones
- Songwriter: Jagger–Richards
- Producer: The Glimmer Twins

Some Girls track listing
- 10 tracks Side one: 1. "Miss You"; 2. "When the Whip Comes Down"; 3. "Just My Imagination (Running Away with Me)"; 4. "Some Girls"; 5. "Lies"; Side two: 6. "Far Away Eyes"; 7. "Respectable"; 8. "Before They Make Me Run"; 9. "Beast of Burden"; 10. "Shattered"

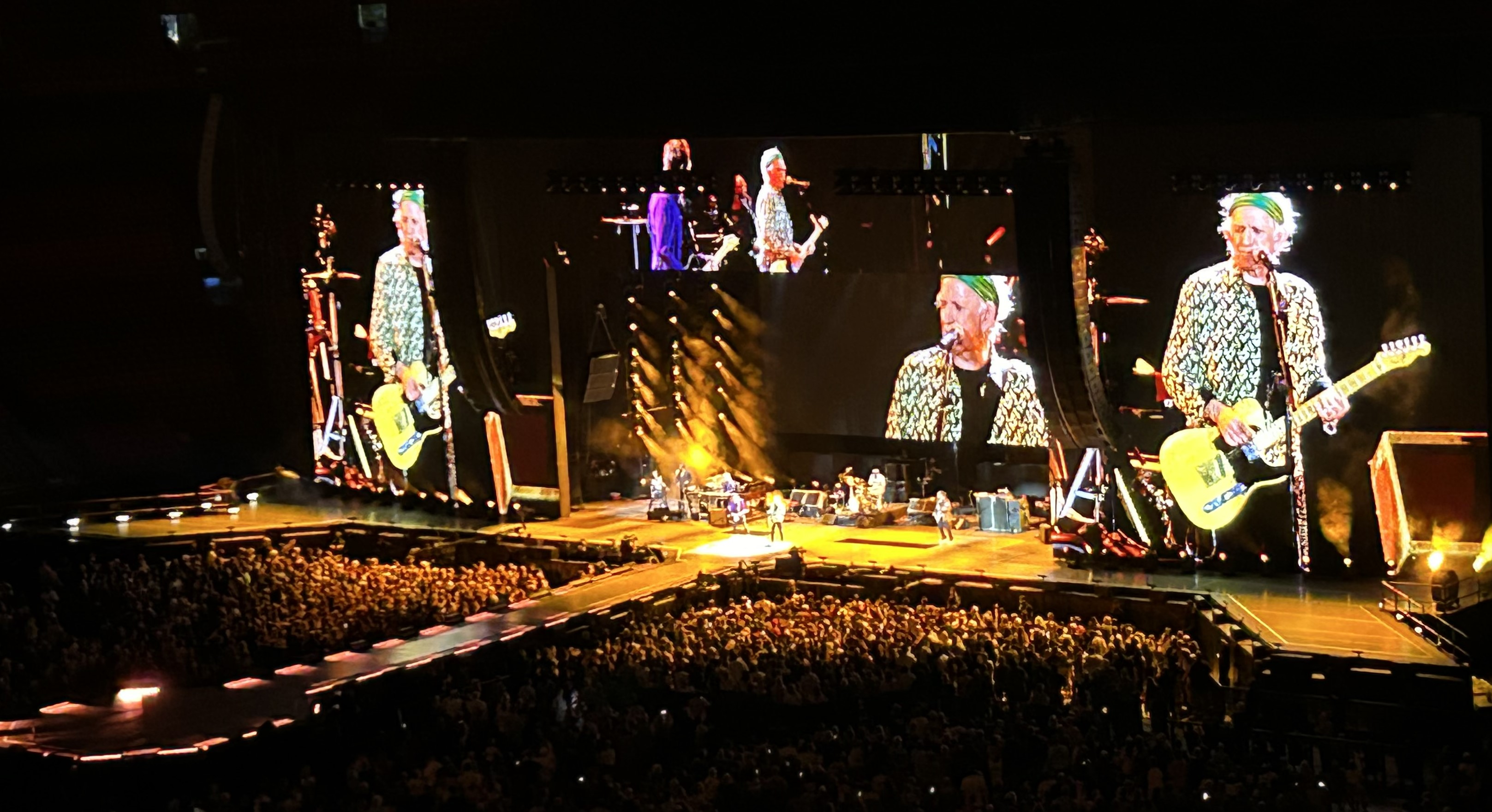
The Rolling Stones performing "Before They Make Me Run" on July 5, 2024 at BC Place in Vancouver

"Before They Make Me Run" is a song by English rock band the Rolling Stones, featured on their 1978 album Some Girls.

Written by guitarist Keith Richards, the song is a response to his arrest for heroin possession in Toronto in February 1977. The criminal charges and prospect of a prison sentence loomed over the Some Girls recording sessions and endangered the future of the Rolling Stones.

In the lyrics, Richards reflects unapologetically on his lifestyle up to that point. The line "it's another goodbye to another good friend" in the first verse can be interpreted as referring to Gram Parsons, Richards's close friend who died in 1973 from a drug overdose, and/or to heroin itself: Richards had sought medical treatment for heroin addiction following his arrest in Toronto, and his resolution to overcome his addiction would be a significant factor in his upcoming trial.

Richards recorded the song in five days without sleeping. The song was recorded in a Paris studio in March 1978 during one of Mick Jagger's absences from the Some Girls sessions. The completed track, "a high-energy rock & roller", features Richards on lead vocals, acoustic and electric guitars, and bass; Ronnie Wood on pedal steel guitar, slide guitar and backing vocals; Charlie Watts on drums; and Jagger on backing vocals.

Richards first performed the song in concert on the New Barbarians' tour of North America in 1979; it was not until the Steel Wheels Tour in 1989 that it entered the Rolling Stones' concert repertoire. Like "Happy", the song has become one of Richards' "signature tunes", performed on most Rolling Stones tours since 1989; he also played it on the X-Pensive Winos' 1992–93 tours promoting his album Main Offender.

Cash Box said that "the beat is perky, and the rhythm and lead guitar work are masterful."

Live performances of the song are included in the Stones' 2003 Four Flicks DVD collection and as bonus tracks in their 2013 and 2016 DVD and Blu-ray sets Sweet Summer Sun: Hyde Park Live and Havana Moon.

Steve Earle has also performed the song in concert and recorded it as part of a split single with the Supersuckers.

== Personnel ==
According to the authors Philippe Margotin and Jean-Michel Guesdon.

The Rolling Stones

- Keith Richards – lead vocals, rhythm guitar, bass guitar
- Mick Jagger – backing vocals
- Ronnie Wood – slide guitar, pedal steel guitar
- Charlie Watts – drums

Technical

- The Glimmer Twins – producers
- Chris Kimsey – engineer
- Barry Sage – assistant engineer
- Ben King – assistant engineer

Note: Margotin and Guesdon are unsure if Richards played acoustic guitar and if Wood sang backing vocals.
