= Some Girls =

Studio album by the Rolling Stones
- Released: 9 June 1978
- Recorded: 10 October 1977 – 2 March 1978
- Studio: Pathé Marconi (Paris)
- Genres: Rock; punk rock; soul; disco; rock and roll
- Length: 40:45
- Label: Rolling Stones
- Producer: The Glimmer Twins

The Rolling Stones chronology
Love You Live (1977)	Some Girls (1978)	Time Waits for No One: Anthology 1971–1977 (1979)

The Rolling Stones studio album chronology
Black and Blue (1976)	Some Girls (1978)	Emotional Rescue (1980)

Singles from Some Girls
- 1. "Miss You" Released: 19 May 1978; 2. "Beast of Burden" Released: 28 August 1978 (US); 3. "Respectable" Released: 15 September 1978 (UK); 4. "Shattered" Released: 29 November 1978 (US)

Some Girls is the fourteenth studio album by the English rock band the Rolling Stones, released on 9 June 1978 by Rolling Stones Records. It was recorded in sessions held from October 1977 to February 1978 at Pathé Marconi Studios in Paris and produced by the band's chief songwriters – lead vocalist Mick Jagger and guitarist Keith Richards (credited as the Glimmer Twins) – with Chris Kimsey engineering the recording.

By 1976, the Rolling Stones' popularity was in decline as the music industry was dominated by disco and newer rock bands. In addition, the punk rock movement was an emerging cultural force in the UK. Due to legal troubles surrounding Richards, Jagger is generally regarded as the principal creative force behind Some Girls. With him drawing influence from dance music, most notably disco, the recording sessions were highly productive, resulting in numerous outtakes that appeared on subsequent albums.

It was the first album to feature guitarist Ronnie Wood as a full-time member; Wood had contributed to some tracks on the band's prior two albums, It's Only Rock 'n Roll (1974) and Black and Blue (1976). With a stable lineup in place for the first time in several years, the album marked a return to basics for the Rolling Stones and did not feature many guest musicians, unlike many of their prior albums. Notable contributions to the album, however, come from blues harmonica player Sugar Blue on "Miss You" and the title track.

Despite controversy surrounding its cover artwork and lyrical content, Some Girls was a commercial success, peaking at number two on the UK Albums Chart and number one on the US Billboard Top LPs & Tapes chart. It became the band's top-selling album in the United States, having been certified by the Recording Industry Association of America (RIAA) for selling six million copies by 2000 in the country. Several hit singles emerged from the album, which became rock radio staples for decades, including "Beast of Burden" (US number eight), "Shattered" (US number 31), "Respectable" (UK number 23), highlighted by "Miss You", which reached number one in the United States and number three in the UK.

Rebounding from the relative critical disappointment of Black and Blue, Some Girls was a critical success, with many reviewers calling it a classic return to form for the band and their best album since Exile on Main St. (1972). It became the only Rolling Stones album to be nominated for a Grammy Award in the Album of the Year category. Retrospectively, it has continued to receive acclaim, with many commending the band's ability to blend contemporary music trends with their older signature style. Some Girls is considered one of the band's finest records, and Rolling Stone has included it in their lists of the "500 Greatest Albums of All Time".

== Background ==
By 1976, the Rolling Stones' popularity was in decline as the charts were dominated by disco and newer bands such as Aerosmith and Kiss. In the UK, the punk rock movement was a rising force and made most artists connected with the 1960s era seem obsolete. The group had also failed to produce a critically acclaimed album since 1972's Exile on Main St.

On 7 February 1977, the Stones were scheduled to play El Mocambo in Toronto, Ontario; however, Keith Richards and his partner Anita Pallenberg were arrested for possession of heroin and suspected of drug trafficking. With the help of Jimmy Carter, who obtained visas, the pair was permitted to leave Canada so that Richards could undergo detoxification in the United States. During this time, Richards obtained a conditional visa for France and met the rest of the Stones in Paris to begin work on what became Some Girls. Facing the possibility of Richards receiving a seven-year sentence in Canada, Jagger and Richards both believed that the Stones might be forced to disband and that Some Girls could be the last album. During Richards' trial, the courtroom was filled with Stones fans and it became clear to reporters present that he would not be "sent to jail". Overseeing the trial, Judge Lloyd Graburn stated that while "heroin addicts should go to prison if they commit theft to support their habit, or make no effort to kick the habit...Richards was different. He made so much money as a rock star, he didn't need to steal, and his effort to remove himself from the drug culture was an example to others." Graburn issued Richards a one-year probation and ordered that he play a benefit concert for the Canadian National Institute for the Blind within six months; Graburn chose this sentencing option after speaking with a blind fan whom Richards had befriended years earlier and ensured her safe passage to and from concerts. Tickets were provided for free to the blind and other tickets were made available for sighted fans at regular price.

Later in February 1977, the Stones renewed their contract with Atlantic Records for US distribution, and out of patriotic feelings originating from this being the year of Queen Elizabeth II's Silver Jubilee, signed with EMI for distribution to the rest of the world.

== Writing and recording ==
The inspiration for [Some Girls] was really based in New York and the ways of the town. I think that gave it an extra spur and hardness. And then, of course, there was the punk thing that had started in 1976. Punk and disco were going on at the same time, so it was quite an interesting period. New York and London, too. Paris—there was punk there. Lots of dance music. Paris and New York had all this Latin dance music, which was really quite wonderful. Much more interesting than the stuff that came afterward.

— Mick Jagger, 1995

Mick Jagger is generally regarded as the principal creative force behind Some Girls. Keith Richards was in legal trouble for much of 1977, which resulted in the band being inactive on the touring circuit during that year, except for two shows in Canada during the spring for the live album Love You Live. Jagger solely wrote "Miss You", as well as "Lies" and "When the Whip Comes Down". In addition to punk, Jagger claims to have been influenced by dance music, most notably disco, during the recording of Some Girls, and cites New York City as a major inspiration for the album, an explanation for his lyrical preoccupation with the city throughout.

At least as important for the band's reinvigoration was the addition of Ronnie Wood to the lineup, as Some Girls was the first album recorded with him as a full member. Unlike the guitar style of Mick Taylor, Wood's guitar playing style meshed with that of Richards, and slide guitar playing became one of the band's hallmarks. His unconventional uses of the instrument featured prominently on Some Girls and he contributed to the writing process. Wood later recalled that working with the Stones was a different experience from with his former band the Faces, stating, "I had never worked so intensely before on a project." In addition, Jagger, who had learned to play guitar over the previous decade, contributed a third guitar part to many songs.

For the first time since 1968's Beggars Banquet, the core band – now Jagger, Richards, Wood, Charlie Watts, and Bill Wyman – were the main musicians on a Rolling Stones album, with few extra contributors. Ian McLagan, Wood's bandmate from the Faces, played keyboards, and harmonica player Sugar Blue contributed to several songs, in addition to saxophonist Mel Collins and Simon Kirke, who played percussion. The band decided not to use studio musicians, including Billy Preston and Nicky Hopkins, as Richards felt that while these musicians were "technically superior" they ultimately led the band into experimental territory and away from their basic sound. Jagger's guitar contributions caused the band's road manager, Ian Stewart, to be absent from many of the sessions, as he felt piano would be superfluous, making this a rare Rolling Stones album on which he did not appear.

Rehearsals for Some Girls began in October 1977 and lasted a month before recording commenced in November, breaking before Christmas and starting up again after New Year's before finishing in March 1978. Under their new British distribution contract with EMI (remaining with Warner Music Group in North America only), they were able to record at EMI's Pathé Marconi Studios in Paris, a venue at which they would record frequently for the next several years. Three studios were made available to the band – two large studios featuring high ceilings and 24-track recording capabilities and a more modest studio with 16-track capabilities. The band opted to use the latter as a rehearsal space, and despite Jagger wanting to move to the larger studios, opted to remain in the smaller one and use it for recording. According to Richards, songs were written on a day-by-day basis. The band ended up recording about 50 new songs, several of which turned up in altered forms on Emotional Rescue (1980) and Tattoo You (1981). Chris Kimsey was the engineer for the sessions. Kimsey's direct method of recording, together with the entrance of the then state-of-the-art Mesa/Boogie Mark I amplifiers instead of the Ampeg SVT line of amps, yielded a bright, direct, and aggressive guitar sound.

== Packaging and artwork ==
The album cover for Some Girls was a collaborative effort involving the design by Peter Corriston and illustrations by Hubert Kretzschmar. Kretzschmar recalled the album originally had the working title "Lies". The two would design the band's next three album covers. An elaborate die-cut design, with the colours on the sleeves varying in different markets, it featured the Rolling Stones' faces alongside those of select female celebrities inserted into a copy of an old Valmor Products Corporation advertisement. The first printing of the album was censored as The Rolling Stone lawyers could not get permission to use those actors' images. The cover design was challenged legally when Lucille Ball, Farrah Fawcett, Liza Minnelli (representing her mother Judy Garland), Raquel Welch, and the estate of Marilyn Monroe threatened to sue for the use of their likenesses without permission. Similarly, Valmor did take legal action and were given a monetary award for the use of their design.

The album was quickly reissued with a redesigned cover that removed all the celebrities, whether they had complained or not. The celebrity images were replaced with black and punk-style garish colours with the phrase "Pardon our appearance – cover under reconstruction". Jagger later apologised to Minnelli when he encountered her during a party at the famous discothèque Studio 54. The only celebrity whose face was not removed was former Beatle George Harrison. As with the original design, the colour schemes on the redesigned sleeves varied in different markets.

A third version of the album cover with the hand-drawn faces from the original Valmor ad was used on the 1986 CD reissue.

== Marketing and sales ==
The lead single, "Miss You", was released on 19 May 1978 by the band's own Rolling Stones label, with the album track "Far Away Eyes" as the B-side; a longer, 12" edit appeared on 2 June. The single was a commercial success, spending seven weeks on the UK Singles Chart, eventually peaking at number three. It fared better in the US, spending 20 weeks on the Billboard Hot 100 – longer than any prior Rolling Stones single – eventually peaking at number one, the band's final single to top the chart. Despite its commercial success, its disco sound alienated part of the fanbase. Regarding this, Jagger stated:

There were a lot of people that were very narrow-minded about it. To me, I wasn't brought up on rock music so much as blues and soul music, and lot of that music was dance music. It was specifically made to dance to... You don't really play the grooves of yesteryear when you make records, you play the grooves of now. And that sort of beat was the thing that was going around at the time. For some people it was a very big hit, but not everyone liked it.

Some Girls was released on 9 June 1978, (Note: Egan writes the album's UK release date as 16 June 1978 and its US release date as 17 June.) with the catalogue number CUN 39108 (UK) and COC 39108 (US). The record continued the band's commercial success. It spent 25 weeks on the UK Albums Chart, peaking at number two the week of 24 June, being kept off the top spot by the Saturday Night Fever soundtrack. It fared better in the US, peaking at number one on the Billboard Top LPs & Tape chart and spending 88 weeks on the chart. "Beast of Burden", backed by "When the Whip Comes Down", was released as the second single on 28 August 1978 in the US, where it reached number eight on the Billboard Hot 100. "Respectable", again backed by "When the Whip Comes Down", was released as the third single in the UK on 15 September, while "Shattered", backed by "Everything is Turning to Gold", appeared as the fourth and final single in the US on 29 November 1978. Both became Top 40 hits.

=== Controversy ===
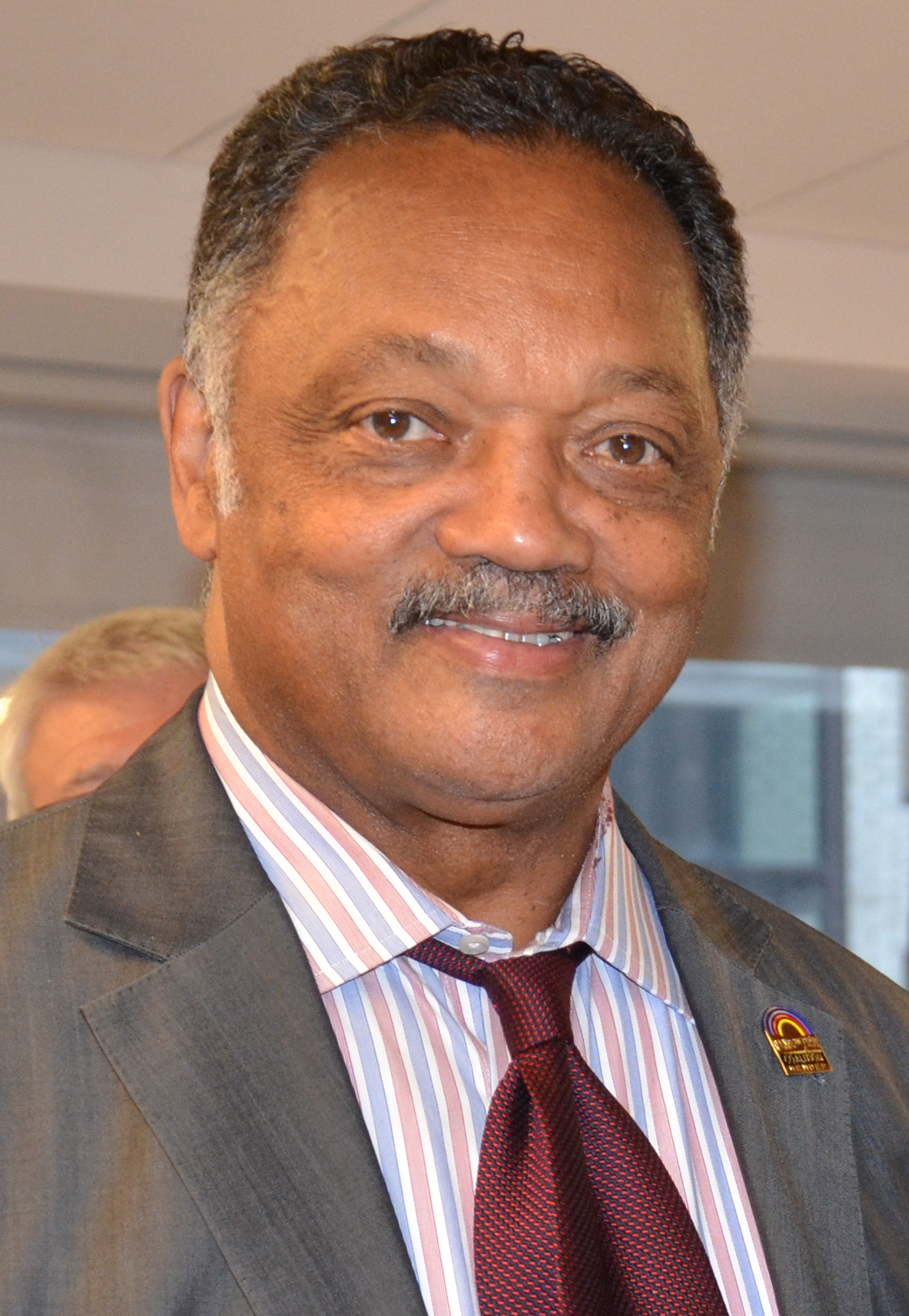
A lyric in the title track attracted controversy from Reverend Jesse Jackson (pictured in 2013), who declared the song to be a "racial insult".

Immediately following its release, Some Girls attracted controversy. According to Cyrus Patell, a prominent black music station WBLS in New York City refused to play "Miss You" due to what the station deemed to be "the offensive racial attitudes of the album and the band." Additionally, the title track attracted controversy with the line "Black Girls just want to get fucked all night/I just don't have that much jam." Regarding the line, Ahmet Ertegun, the chairman of Atlantic Records (the US distributor of Rolling Stones Records), stated: "When I first heard the song, I told Mick it was not going to go down well. Mick assured me that it was a parody of the type of people who hold these attitudes. Mick has great respect for blacks. He owes his whole being, his whole musical career, to black people." Incidentally, black-oriented radio stations began to boycott "Some Girls", leading Jagger to tell Rolling Stone: "Atlantic tried to get us to drop it, but I refused. I've always been opposed to censorship of any kind, especially by conglomerates. I've always said, 'If you can't take a joke, it's too fucking bad.'"

On 6 October 1978, Ertegun met with Reverend Jesse Jackson, then leader of Operation PUSH (People United to Save Humanity) to discuss the lyric. The meeting ended with Jackson declaring the song to be a "racial insult" that "degrades blacks and women", threatening to boycott the record until a resolution was met. Ertegun concurred, saying, "It is not our wish to in any way demean, insult, or make less of the people without whom there would be no Atlantic Records." After discussing the matter with Atlantic officials, who considered censoring the line, Earl McGrath, president of Rolling Stones Records, released a statement on 12 October on behalf of the band:

It never occurred to us that our parody of certain stereotypical attitudes would be taken seriously by anyone who heard the entire lyric of the song in question. No insult was intended, and if any was taken, we sincerely apologise.

=== Tour ===
The Stones embarked on their summer US Tour 1978 in support of the album, which for the first time had them mount several small-venue shows, sometimes under a pseudonym. This was shorter and less ambitious than previous Stones tours, with only 26 shows performed over one and a half months, all of them in the US. Nonetheless, Some Girls became the third-best represented album in Stones' concert setlists after Let It Bleed and Exile on Main St. All its 10 songs have been played live – a distinction it shares only with Let It Bleed and Sticky Fingers (Note: In the case of Sticky Fingers, it might be noted that "Sway" was never played live until 2005, whereas every track on Some Girls had been performed six years before that.) – although the title song was never performed until 1999, and only "Lies" was never played after the last dates in support of the album.

== Critical reception and legacy ==
Professional ratings
Initial reviews
Review scores
Source	Rating
Record Mirror	3/5 stars
The Rolling Stone Record Guide (1979, 1st ed.)	(Note: Some Girls received the same score in the second edition of The Rolling Stone Record Guide, titled The New Rolling Stone Record Guide (1983).)
The Village Voice	A

Upon release, Some Girls received extremely positive reviews from music critics, with many agreeing it was the Stones' best work since Exile on Main St. Music critic Pete Bishop wrote for The Pittsburgh Press that Some Girls was "the best album the Rolling Stones have done for years". Robert Hilburn ranked Some Girls one of the band's best works in the Los Angeles Times, calling it a "splendid return to form". Reviewing for The Village Voice in 1978, Robert Christgau said,

The Stones' best album since Exile on Main St. is also their easiest since Let It Bleed or before. They haven't gone for a knockdown uptempo classic, a 'Brown Sugar' or 'Jumpin' Jack Flash'—just straight rock and roll unencumbered by horn sections or Billy Preston. Even Jagger takes a relatively direct approach, and if he retains any credibility for you after six years of dicking around, there should be no agonizing over whether you like this record, no waiting for tunes to kick in. Lyrically, there are some bad moments—especially on the title cut, which is too fucking indirect to suit me—but in general the abrasiveness seems personal, earned, unposed, and the vulnerability more genuine than ever. Also, the band is a real good one. Real good.

In his review of the album for Rolling Stone in June 1978, Paul Nelson wrote that while Some Girls may have been the band's finest LP since its "certified masterpiece", Exile on Main St., "what I won't buy is that the two albums deserve to be mentioned in the same breath. [...] Some Girls is like a marriage of convenience: when it works — which is often — it can be meaningful, memorable and quite moving, but it rarely sends the arrow straight through the heart." Fellow critic Dave Marsh was also negative towards the record, citing inconsistent song quality and band performances. Three months later, in September, Rolling Stone editor Jann Wenner published his own review, rebutting that of Nelson. He heaped praise on the "Miss You" single, writing that the song "exemplifies the polish, power, and passion of the Stones", equalled 'Tumbling Dice' and 'Brown Sugar', and "may even set new standards for the band." At the end of the year, Rolling Stone named both the band and Some Girls their top artist and album of the year, respectively.

Writing for Circus magazine, Nick Tosches gave praise to the record, calling it their best in five years: "After five years, the rhythm is back, and satisfaction and shelter are once again just out of reach." He further wrote that Some Girls more than makes up for the group's prior works. After Black and Blue, Richard Riegel of Creem called Some Girls a return to "refreshingly kinetic rock 'n' roll". He further gave praise to Jagger's vocal performances and Wood's contributions on guitar. In Sounds, Peter Silverton spoke positively of the record, highlighting "Miss You" as the standout. He concluded: "Because they recorded so quickly (by their standards) they've achieved an immediacy on this which has been sorely lacking on their last few studio albums. It's far from great but it's certainly better than we had any right to expect after all these years." Kris Needs, in a review for ZigZag magazine, complimented the album's consistency when compared to its three predecessors. Needs further praised the lyrics as improvements over their prior works. NME's Charles Shaar Murray gave the album a more mixed assessment. Although he agreed it was their finest work since Exile on Main St., he felt it was more a Jagger solo record than a proper Rolling Stones record, praising his singing and Watts's drumming. Nevertheless, he considered the production a step up from Black and Blue and gave high praise to "Shattered".

At the end of the year, Rolling Stone ranked Some Girls the best album of 1978. Other publications, including Sounds and NME, placed the album at numbers 4 and 18 in their respective lists of the year's best albums.

=== Reappraisal ===
Professional ratings
Retrospective reviews
Review scores
Source	Rating
AllMusic	5/5 stars
The Encyclopedia of Popular Music	4/5 stars
The Great Rock Discography	7/10
MusicHound Rock	4/5 stars
Music Story	3/5 stars
NME	9/10
Rolling Stone	4.5/5 stars
The Rolling Stone Album Guide	(Note: The Rolling Stone Album Guide (1992, 3rd ed.).) (Note: (The New) Rolling Stone Album Guide (2004, 4th ed.).)
Tom Hull – on the Web	A
Uncut	5/5 stars

Some Girls has continued to receive critical acclaim, with many reviewers commending the band's ability to blend punk and disco influences with their older signature style. Writing for AllMusic, Stephen Thomas Erlewine praised the album, calling it "a tough, focused, and exciting record, full of more hooks and energy than any Stones record since Exile on Main St." Commending the group's performance compared to their previous works, Erlewine felt the rock tracks sound "harder and nastier than they have in years". He concluded his review stating: "Some Girls may not have the back-street aggression of their '60s records, or the majestic, drugged-out murk of their early-'70s work, but its brand of glitzy, decadent hard rock still makes it a definitive Stones album." After a period of decline due to emerging music trends, Jeff Giles of Ultimate Classic Rock credits Some Girls as successfully reinvigorating the band's sound and keeping its own identity, writing: "While the record incorporated elements familiar to longtime Stones fans...it infused the group's staid sonic aesthetic with disco rhythms and a dash of jagged punk aggression." Giles concluded that the album proved that "when they put their minds to it, the Stones were still capable of earning the title of the World's Greatest Rock 'n' Roll Band."

Yahoo! Music's Lÿndsey Parker described Some Girls as one of the band's "toughest, rawest, hookiest, cockiest, Stonesiest, most attitudinal albums ever". She further commented that it stands as one of few Stones albums to have "held up as sonically, and still sound as gritty and urban and sexy and just downright cool, as their 1978 disco/punk/country/blues masterwork". In The A.V. Club, Steven Hyden commented that the record was not a case of selling out, but rather showcased that the band "could pull off the old magic using some flashy new tricks". Hyden further praised Richards' guitar performance, particularly on "Beast of Burden" and "Before They Make Me Run", writing that he is "healthier and more prominent on Some Girls than on any Stones record since Exile On Main St." Matthew Fiander of PopMatters commented that after Exile on Main St., the Stones were beginning to feel "safe" and "comfortable". He writes that Goats Head Soup led to two records that weren't as innovative as their prior works. Upon the emergence of punk rock, Jagger led the band to create what he calls "the band's most impassioned and fiery record of the '70s" (excluding Sticky Fingers and Exile). Praising the band's performance, particularly Wood, Fiander writes: "What's so amazing about this album is that, though it dabbles in newer trends...it still feels very much like a Rolling Stones record, a fresh angle on their long-time loves of blues and rock and roll traditions."

=== Rankings ===
Some Girls has frequently appeared on several "best-of" lists by multiple publications. In 2000, it was voted number 300 in writer Colin Larkin's book All Time Top 1000 Albums. In 2003 Some Girls was ranked number 269 on Rolling Stone magazine's list of the 500 Greatest Albums of All Time, 270 in a 2012 revised list, and 468 in the 2020 revised list. In 2015, Ultimate Classic Rock included the album in their list of the top 100 rock albums of the '70s, while a year later, Classic Rock magazine placed the album at number seven on its list of the 100 greatest albums of the '70s.

== Reissues ==
Professional ratings
2011 deluxe edition
Aggregate scores
Source	Rating
Metacritic	93/100
Review scores
Source	Rating
The A.V. Club	A
Blurt	9/10 stars
Consequence	A+
Entertainment Weekly	B−
Filter	79%
The Guardian	4/5 stars
MSN Music (Expert Witness)	A−
PopMatters	8/10 stars
Rolling Stone	5/5 stars
Tom Hull – on the Web	A−

In 1986, the first compact disc version of the album was issued by the Stones' new label distributor, Columbia Records, as Rolling Stones/Columbia CK-40449. In 1994, with the acquisition of the Rolling Stones Records catalogue by Virgin Records, Some Girls was remastered and re-issued. The first pressing was packaged in a replica of the die-cut vinyl packaging, representing the redesigned 1978 cover in a pale color scheme. In 2009, the album was remastered and reissued by Universal Music; the reissue restored one of the brighter color schemes of the redesigned 1978 cover.

Some Girls was re-issued on 21 November 2011 as a 2-CD deluxe edition, including twelve songs originally recorded during the two sessions for the album (with the exception of "Tallahassee Lassie" from August–September 1978 and "We Had It All" from 1979). A Super-Deluxe edition also included a DVD with live footage & promo videos, a 100-page book, five postcards, a poster, and a 7" 180-gram replica vinyl single of "Beast of Burden". Most of the backing tracks were recorded in Paris between October 1977 and March 1978 with mostly newly recorded vocals by Jagger, which were recorded sometime during 2010 and 2011. The album re-entered the charts at No. 58 in the UK and No. 46 in the US. "No Spare Parts" was released as a single on 13 November, which went to No. 2 on Billboard's Hot Singles Sales. "So Young" was the second single from the Some Girls reissue, released briefly for free on iTunes the same day "No Spare Parts" was released. A video for "No Spare Parts" was produced and later released on 19 December 2011.

In 2012, it was released by Universal Music Enterprises in a Japanese-only SHM-SACD version.

== Track listing ==
All tracks are written by Mick Jagger and Keith Richards, except where noted.

Side one
No.	Title	Writer(s)	Length
1.	"Miss You"		4:48
2.	"When the Whip Comes Down"		4:20
3.	"Just My Imagination (Running Away with Me)"	Norman Whitfield, Barrett Strong	4:38
4.	"Some Girls"		4:36
5.	"Lies"		3:11

Side two
No.	Title	Length
1.	"Far Away Eyes"	4:24
2.	"Respectable"	3:06
3.	"Before They Make Me Run"	3:25
4.	"Beast of Burden"	4:25
5.	"Shattered"	3:48
Total length:		40:45

Note

- North American copies of the album on 8-track tape format contain extended versions of "Miss You" and "Beast of Burden" and edited versions of the songs "Far Away Eyes", "Shattered" and "Just My Imagination (Running Away with Me)".

=== 2011 Deluxe Edition ===
Disc two – bonus material
No.	Title	Writer(s)	Length
1.	"Claudine"		3:42
2.	"So Young"		3:18
3.	"Do You Think I Really Care?"		4:22
4.	"When You're Gone"	Mick Jagger, Keith Richards, Ronnie Wood	3:51
5.	"No Spare Parts"		4:30
6.	"Don't Be a Stranger"		4:06
7.	"We Had It All"	Troy Seals, Donnie Fritts	2:54
8.	"Tallahassee Lassie"	Bob Crewe, Frank Slay, Freddy Cannon	2:37
9.	"I Love You Too Much"		3:10
10.	"Keep Up Blues"		4:20
11.	"You Win Again"	Hank Williams	3:00
12.	"Petrol Blues"		1:35

== Personnel ==
Album credits per the 2011 deluxe edition liner notes. Track numbers noted in parentheses below are based on the CD track numbering.

The Rolling Stones

- Mick Jagger – lead vocals (all but 8), backing vocals (1–3, 6, 8–10), electric guitar (1–5, 7), piano (6), percussion (10)
- Keith Richards – electric guitar (all tracks), backing vocals (1–3, 6, 8–10), acoustic guitar (4, 6, 8–9), bass guitar (4, 8), piano (6), lead vocals (8)
- Ronnie Wood – electric guitar (all but 6), backing vocals (1–3, 6, 8, 10), pedal steel (2, 6, 10), acoustic guitar (4, 9), bass guitar (10), bass drum (10)
- Bill Wyman – bass guitar (1–3, 5–7, 9), synthesiser (4)
- Charlie Watts – drums (all tracks)

Additional personnel

- Sugar Blue – harmonica (1, 4)
- Ian McLagan – electric piano (1), organ (3)
- Mel Collins – saxophone (1)
- Simon Kirke – congas (10)
- Chris Kimsey – mixing engineer
- Ted Jensen – vinyl mastering
- Greg Calbi – 1986 CD mastering at Sterling Sound
- Bob Ludwig – 1994 remastering at Gateway Mastering
- Stephen Marcussen, Stewart Whitmore – 2009 remastering at Marcussen Mastering

Additional personnel on 2011 bonus disc

- Ian Stewart – bonus tracks: piano on "Claudine", "So Young", "Do You Think I Really Care?", "Tallahassee Lassie", "You Win Again", and "Petrol Blues"
- Chuck Leavell – bonus tracks: piano solo on "So Young"
- Don Was – bonus tracks: bass guitar on "Don't Be a Stranger"; handclaps on "Tallahassee Lassie"
- John Fogerty – bonus tracks: handclaps on "Tallahassee Lassie"
- Matt Clifford – bonus tracks: percussion on "Don't Be a Stranger"
- Sugar Blue – bonus tracks: harmonica on "Don't Be a Stranger" and "We Had It All"

== Charts ==
=== Weekly charts ===
Original release

1978–79 weekly chart performance for Some Girls
Chart (1978)	Peak position
Australian Albums (Kent Music Report)	3
Austrian Albums (Ö3 Austria)	4
Canada Top Albums/CDs (RPM)	1
Dutch Albums (Album Top 100)	3
Finland (The Official Finnish Charts)	11
German Albums (Offizielle Top 100)	6
Italian Albums (Musica e Dischi)	6
Japanese Albums (Oricon)	11
New Zealand Albums (RMNZ)	2
Norwegian Albums (VG-lista)	3
Spanish Albums (PROMUSICAE)	5
Swedish Albums (Sverigetopplistan)	3
UK Albums (Official Charts)	2
US Billboard 200	1

Reissue

2011 weekly chart performance for Some Girls
Chart (2011)	Peak position
Australian Albums (Kent Music Report)	93
Austrian Albums (Ö3 Austria)	38
Belgian Albums (Ultratop Flanders)	83
Dutch Albums (Album Top 100)	25
French Albums (SNEP)	61
German Albums (Offizielle Top 100)	14
Japanese Albums (Oricon)	46
New Zealand Albums (RMNZ)	33
Norwegian Albums (VG-lista)	39
Spanish Albums (Promusicae)	59
Swedish Albums (Sverigetopplistan)	41
Swiss Albums (Schweizer Hitparade)	48
UK Albums (Official Charts)	58
US Billboard 200	46

=== Year-end charts ===
1978 year-end chart performance for Some Girls
Chart (1978)	Position
Australian Albums (Kent Music Report)	9
Austrian Albums (Ö3 Austria)	10
Canadian Albums (RPM)	3
Dutch Albums (MegaCharts)	22
French Albums (SNEP)	26
German Albums (Offizielle Top 100)	24
New Zealand Albums (RMNZ)	6
UK Albums (OCC)	26
US Billboard Pop Albums	43

1979 year-end chart performance for Some Girls
Chart (1979)	Position
Canadian Albums (RPM)	89
US Billboard Pop Albums	22

== Certifications and sales ==
Certifications and sales for Some Girls
Region	Certification	Certified units/sales
France (SNEP)	Gold	100,000^{*}
Greece	—	15,000
Japan (RIAJ)	Gold	100,000^{^}
Netherlands (NVPI)	Platinum	100,000^{^}
New Zealand (RMNZ)	Platinum	15,000^{^}
United Kingdom (BPI)	Gold	100,000^{^}
United States (RIAA)	6× Platinum	6,000,000^{^}
^{*} Sales figures based on certification alone.^{^} Shipments figures based on certification alone.

== See also ==
- Some Girls: Live in Texas '78
