= Beast of Burden (song) =

1978 song by The Rolling Stones

- Cover of the 1978 US single

Single by the Rolling Stones

from the album Some Girls
- B-side: "When the Whip Comes Down"
- Released: 28 August 1978 (US)
- Recorded: 10 October–21 December 1977; Pathé Marconi Studios
- Genre: Blues rock; soul; soft rock
- Length: 4:24 (album version); 3:28 (single edit)
- Label: Rolling Stones
- Songwriter: Jagger–Richards
- Producer: The Glimmer Twins

The Rolling Stones singles chronology
"Miss You" (1978)	"Beast of Burden" (1978)	"Respectable" (1978)

Some Girls track listing
- 10 tracks Side one: 1. "Miss You"; 2. "When the Whip Comes Down"; 3. "Just My Imagination (Running Away with Me)"; 4. "Some Girls"; 5. "Lies"; Side two: 6. "Far Away Eyes"; 7. "Respectable"; 8. "Before They Make Me Run"; 9. "Beast of Burden"; 10. "Shattered"

"Beast of Burden" is a song by the English rock band the Rolling Stones from their 1978 album Some Girls. In 2004, Rolling Stone magazine ranked the song No. 435 on their list of "The 500 Greatest Songs of All Time".

== Background ==
A "beast of burden" is an animal, usually domesticated, that labours for the benefit of man, such as an ox or horse. The music and some lyrics were primarily written by Keith Richards. In the liner notes to the 1993 compilation disc Jump Back, Richards said "Beast of Burden" "was another one where Mick (Jagger) just filled in the verses. With the Stones, you take a long song, play it and see if there are any takers. Sometimes, they ignore it; sometimes, they grab it and record it. After all the faster numbers of Some Girls, everybody settled down and enjoyed the slow one."

In those same notes, Jagger says, "Lyrically, this wasn't particularly heartfelt in a personal way. It's a soul-begging song, an attitude song. It was one of those where you get one melodic lick, break it down and work it up; there are two parts here which are basically the same." The song can be seen as allegorical, with Richards saying in 2003, "When I returned to the fold after closing down the laboratory [referring to his drug problems throughout the 1970s], I came back into the studio with Mick ... to say, 'Thanks, man, for shouldering the burden' - that's why I wrote 'Beast of Burden' for him, I realise in retrospect."

"Beast of Burden" was recorded between October and December 1977. Although some of the original lyrics were written before the Stones entered the studio, a lot of the verses were improvised by Jagger during the sessions to match the smooth guitar riffs created by Richards and Ronnie Wood. Characteristically, Richards and Wood trade off rolling, fluid licks. Neither of them is playing lead or rhythm guitar exclusively, as they both complement each other by alternating between high and low harmony lines. By then, they had made a habit of slipping in and out of playing lead and rhythm, resulting in a cohesive sound greater than the sum of its parts. The song is another Some Girls song that features each band member playing his respective instrument without any outside performers; both Richards and Wood play acoustic and electric guitars, with Wood performing the solo. Ultimate Classic Rock critic Michael Gallucci said of Charlie Watts' drumming that "he locks into a groove immediately after the great opening guitar riff, giving the mid-tempo song a worthy backbeat to carry it through to the end," also saying that it is a "typically subtle, but absolutely brilliant, performance."

== Personnel ==
According to the authors Philippe Margotin and Jean-Michel Guesdon.

The Rolling Stones

- Mick Jagger – lead vocals
- Keith Richards – rhythm guitar, backing vocals
- Ronnie Wood – rhythm and lead guitar
- Bill Wyman – bass guitar
- Charlie Watts – drums

Technical

- The Glimmer Twins – producers
- Chris Kimsey – engineer
- Barry Sage – assistant engineer
- Ben King – assistant engineer

Note: Margotin and Guesdon are unsure if Jagger played rhythm guitar.

== Release and aftermath ==
The song was released as the second single off the album. Billboard praised its "seductive lyrics" and "catchy R&B flavor". Cash Box said it is "a slow but perky ballad" with "tasty guitar licks". Record World said it "should be equally endearing to both their new and old audiences" as "Miss You".

At US major charts, It reached No. 8 in Billboard Hot 100, No. 7 in Cashbox Top 100 and No. 11 in Record World. A live version was recorded during their 1981 American Tour and was released as a B-side to "Going to a Go-Go", as well as being reissued on Rarities 1971-2003 in 2005. Another live version was recorded during their 2002-2003 Licks Tour, which was released on Live Licks. The single edit of "Beast of Burden" was included on the compilation albums Sucking in the Seventies, Rewind (1971–1984), Jump Back, Forty Licks and GRRR!. A 5:20 version of the song with extra lyrics circulates among collectors. It was taken from the eight-track mix of Some Girls, which features significant differences from all other versions of the album. The song was included in the 1983 film Christine.

== Charts ==
Weekly chart performance for "Beast of Burden"
Chart (1978)	Peak position
US Billboard Hot 100	8
US Rock Singles Best Sellers (Billboard)	12
US Cash Box Top 100	7
US Record World Singles Chart	11

== Certifications ==
Certifications and sales for "Beast of Burden"
Region	Certification	Certified units/sales
Australia (ARIA)	3× Platinum	210,000^{‡}
New Zealand (RMNZ)	3× Platinum	90,000^{‡}
United Kingdom (BPI)	Gold	400,000^{‡}
^{‡} Sales+streaming figures based on certification alone.

== Bette Midler version ==
"Beast of Burden"

Single by Bette Midler

from the album No Frills
- B-side: "Come Back, Jimmy Dean"
- Released: 10 February 1984
- Length: 3:48
- Label: Atlantic
- Songwriter: Jagger/Richards
- Producers: Chuck Plotkin, Brock Walsh, Danny Goldberg

Bette Midler singles chronology
"Favorite Waste of Time" (1983)	"Beast of Burden" (1984)	"Under the Boardwalk" (1988)

Music video
- "Beast of Burden" on YouTube

In 1984, "Beast of Burden" was covered by Bette Midler. Her version modifies several lines of lyric (for example, changing "Pretty, pretty, girls" to "my little sister is a pretty, pretty girl"). The track appeared on Midler's No Frills album. Midler's version peaked at No. 71 on the US Billboard Hot 100 and entered the top 10 in several countries, including Norway and Sweden, where it reached No. 2.

Cash Box said that "Midler appropriately switches from sensitive to sassy vocal delivery" and that "the production is faithful to the original."

A music video was created for this version of the song. It started with Bette Midler and Mick Jagger having a conversation in her dressing room before they both came out and performed the song together on stage. Towards the end of the song, someone throws a cream pie at Jagger, and Midler laughs until she is hit with a pie herself. The video concludes with a picture of them both covered in pie, which appears in a newspaper with the headline "Just desserts."

=== Track listing ===
7-inch single

1. "Beast of Burden" - 3:48
2. "Come Back, Jimmy Dean" - 3:51

=== Charts ===
==== Weekly charts ====
Weekly chart performance for "Beast of Burden"
Chart (1984)	Peak position
Australia (Kent Music Report)	12
Belgium (Ultratop 50 Flanders)	15
Netherlands (Dutch Top 40)	10
Netherlands (Single Top 100)	11
New Zealand (Recorded Music NZ)	4
Norway (VG-lista)	2
Sweden (Sverigetopplistan)	2
US Billboard Hot 100	71
West Germany (GfK)	15

==== Year-end charts ====
Year-end chart performance for "Beast of Burden"
Chart (1984)	Position
Australia (Kent Music Report)	64
