= When the Whip Comes Down =

Song by The Rolling Stones

from the album Some Girls
- Released: 9 June 1978
- Recorded: October–December 1977
- Genre: Rock and roll
- Length: 4:20
- Label: Rolling Stones/Virgin
- Songwriter: Jagger/Richards
- Producer: The Glimmer Twins

Some Girls track listing
- 10 tracks Side one: 1. "Miss You"; 2. "When the Whip Comes Down"; 3. "Just My Imagination (Running Away with Me)"; 4. "Some Girls"; 5. "Lies"; Side two: 6. "Far Away Eyes"; 7. "Respectable"; 8. "Before They Make Me Run"; 9. "Beast of Burden"; 10. "Shattered"

Official audio"When the Whip Comes Down" (Remastered) on YouTube

"When the Whip Comes Down" is a song by the English rock and roll band the Rolling Stones from their 1978 album Some Girls.

"When the Whip Comes Down" was written by Mick Jagger and Keith Richards, although Jagger handled the song's lyrics.

== Background ==
Quite unusual, even for the late 1970s, the lyrics deal openly with the perspective of a gay man:

Yeah, mama and papa told me I was crazy to stay/ I was gay in New York, I was a fag in L.A./ So I saved my money and I took the plane/ Wherever I go, they just treat me the same.

In a 1978 interview with Rolling Stone magazine to mark the release of Some Girls, Jagger responded to questions regarding the song's lyrics: "...There is one song that's a straight gay song—"When the Whip Comes Down"—but I have no idea why I wrote it. It's strange - the Rolling Stones have always attracted a lot of men... I don't know why I wrote it. Maybe I came out of the closet {laughs}. It's about an imaginary person who comes from L.A. to New York City and becomes a garbage collector... I sure hope the radio stations will play [it]." The lyrics could be taken to imply that the singer becomes a male prostitute:

Yeah I go to 53rd Street and they spit in my face/ But I'm learning the ropes, yeah, I'm learning a trade/ The East River truckers is churning with trash/ I've got so much money but I spend it so fast.

Yeah, some call me garbage when I'm sweeping up the street/ But I never roll and I never cheat/ And I'm filling a need, yeah, I'm plugging a hole/ My mama's so glad I ain't on the dole.

"When the Whip Comes Down" was recorded at the Pathé Marconi studio in Paris, France, between the months of October and December 1977. It was another of the famed Some Girls songs to feature just the core members of the Rolling Stones at the time. Jagger performed vocals plus guitar alongside Richards and Ronnie Wood. Wood would also contribute pedal steel guitar to the number, an instrument that also appears on the Some Girls songs "Shattered" and "Far Away Eyes". Bill Wyman performs bass while Charlie Watts plays the song's distinctive, driving drum beat. There are versions of both the base instrumental track and the fully developed backing track with additional lyrics, that run over ten minutes, widely available on bootlegs.

The song is seen by some Rolling Stones fans as the closest the Stones came to outright punk music on the album that many call the Stones' "punk album". It is also one of a few songs on the album to carry a heavy New York City influence.

Classic Rock History critic Matthew Pollard rated it as the Rolling Stones' 7th best deep cut, saying that it "demonstrates the squalid grandeur of their rock and roll appeal".

A recording from a live show at the Detroit Masonic Temple, on 6 July 1978, was released on the 1981 compilation album Sucking in the Seventies, which covered much of their later 1970s material. It also acted as album mate "Respectable"'s B-side. A live recording from their 2002–2003 Licks Tour was captured and released on the 2004 live album Live Licks.

When the Whip Comes Down is also the name of a 16-track Nine Inch Nails bootleg album taken from their performance at the Woodstock '94 music festival.

== Personnel ==
According to the authors Philippe Margotin and Jean-Michel Guesdon.

The Rolling Stones

- Mick Jagger – lead vocals, rhythm guitar
- Keith Richards – rhythm guitar, backing vocals
- Ronnie Wood – lead guitar, backing vocals
- Bill Wyman – bass guitar
- Charlie Watts – drums

Technical

- The Glimmer Twins – producers
- Chris Kimsey – engineer
- Barry Sage – assistant engineer
- Ben King – assistant engineer

Note: Margotin and Guesdon are unsure if Ronnie Wood played slide guitar or pedal steel guitar.
