= Just My Imagination (Running Away with Me) =

1971 single by the Temptations

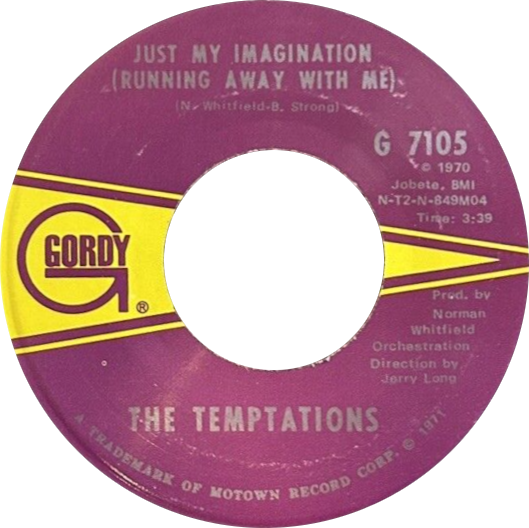
- One of label variants of the US single

Single by The Temptations

from the album Sky's the Limit
- B-side: "You Make Your Own Heaven and Hell Right Here on Earth"
- Released: January 14, 1971
- Recorded: November 24, 1970 and December 3, 1970
- Studio: Golden World (Studio B)
- Genre: Soul; R&B
- Length: 3:54
- Label: Gordy (G 7105)
- Songwriters: Norman Whitfield; Barrett Strong
- Producer: Norman Whitfield

The Temptations singles chronology
"Ungena Za Ulimwengu (Unite the World)" (1970)	"Just My Imagination (Running Away with Me)" (1971)	"It's Summer" (1971)

Official audio"Just My Imagination (Running Away With Me)" (Lyric Video) on YouTube

"Just My Imagination (Running Away with Me)"
Album version of "Just My Imagination (Running Away with Me)", performed by The Temptations.

"Just My Imagination (Running Away with Me)"

Song by The Rolling Stones

from the album Some Girls
- Released: June 9, 1978
- Recorded: October – December 1977
- Studio: Pathé Marconi (Paris)
- Genre: Blues rock
- Length: 4:38
- Label: Rolling Stones; Virgin
- Songwriters: Norman Whitfield; Barrett Strong
- Producer: The Glimmer Twins

Some Girls track listing
- 10 tracks Side one: 1. "Miss You"; 2. "When the Whip Comes Down"; 3. "Just My Imagination (Running Away with Me)"; 4. "Some Girls"; 5. "Lies"; Side two: 6. "Far Away Eyes"; 7. "Respectable"; 8. "Before They Make Me Run"; 9. "Beast of Burden"; 10. "Shattered"

Official audio"Just My Imagination (Running Away with Me)" (Remastered) on YouTube

"Just My Imagination (Running Away with Me)" is a song by American soul group the Temptations, written by Norman Whitfield and Barrett Strong. Released on the Gordy (Motown) label, and produced by Norman Whitfield, it features on the group's 1971 album, Sky's the Limit. When released as a single, "Just My Imagination" became the third Temptations song to reach number one on the US Billboard Hot 100. The single held the number one position on the Billboard Pop Singles Chart for two weeks in 1971, from March 28 to April 10. "Just My Imagination" also held the number one spot on the Billboard R&B Singles chart for three weeks, from February 27 to March 20 of that year.

Today, "Just My Imagination" is considered one of the Temptations' signature songs, and is notable for recalling the sound of the group's 1960s recordings. It is also the final Temptations single to feature founding members Eddie Kendricks and Paul Williams. During the process of recording and releasing the single, Kendricks left the group to begin a solo career, while the ailing Williams was forced to retire from the act for health reasons. In 2010, Rolling Stone magazine listed "Just My Imagination" as number 399 on its list of The 500 Greatest Songs of All Time but exited after the 2021 update. The song was covered by the Rolling Stones on their Some Girls album in 1978.

== Composition and lyrics ==
A full orchestral arrangement with strings and French horns adorning a bluesy rhythm track and bass line provides the instrumentals. Music critic Stephen Thomas Erlewine of AllMusic notes that the song is narrated by a man who imagines a relationship with the woman he loves, is canny enough to realize that his daydreams are fiction, yet is overwhelmed by them. The lyrics capture his resignation to his fantasies. The song as a whole captures their full emotional effect on him. The first two verses establish the theme and explore the narrator's daydreams, in which he and the object of his affections are lovers preparing to be married, to "raise a family" and build "a cozy little home / out in the country / with two children, maybe three". In the bridge, the narrator prays that he will never lose her love to another, or he will "surely die". By introducing this doubt, the musical bridge simultaneously connects the movement from dream to reality, completed when the final lines shift from imagery to bald statement: "But in reality / she doesn't even know me". For Erlewine, "the Temptations' performance has a dream-like quality, quietly drifting through the singer's hopes and desires."

== Origins ==
During the late 1960s and early 1970s, producer/composer Norman Whitfield and lyricist Barrett Strong crafted a string of "psychedelic soul" tracks for the Temptations. By 1970, the Temptations had released psychedelically influenced hits such as "Runaway Child, Running Wild", "Psychedelic Shack", "Ball of Confusion (That's What the World Is Today)", and the Grammy Award-winning "Cloud Nine". In a 1991 interview, Eddie Kendricks recalled that many of the Temptations' fans were "screaming bloody murder" after the group delved into psychedelia, and demanded a return to their original soul sound.

"Just My Imagination" was the result of one of the few times that Whitfield relented and produced a ballad as a single for the group. Whitfield and Strong wrote the song in 1969, but with the Temptations' psychedelic soul singles consistently keeping them in the US Top 20, Whitfield and Strong decided to shelve the composition and wait for the right time to record it. In late 1970, the Temptations' single "Ungena Za Ulimwengu (Unite the World)", a psychedelic soul song about world peace, failed to reach the Top 30, and Whitfield decided to record and release "Just My Imagination" as the next single. He approached Barrett Strong, and asked him to pull out "that song we were messing around with a year ago... because I'm going to record it today." Except for their late 1960s duets with Diana Ross & the Supremes, the Temptations had not released a single that was not based in psychedelia since "Please Return Your Love to Me" from The Temptations Wish It Would Rain in 1968.

== Recording ==
Norman Whitfield began the recording of "Just My Imagination" by preparing the song's instrumental track. Whitfield arranged and recorded the non-orchestral elements of the instrumental with Motown's studio band, The Funk Brothers, who for this recording included Eddie Willis and Dennis Coffey on guitar, Jack Ashford on marimba, Jack Brokensha on timpani, Andrew Smith on drums, and Bob Babbitt on bass. Jerry Long, an arranger who had previous experience with scoring films in Paris, worked on the orchestral arrangement and conducted several members of the Detroit Symphony Orchestra in performing the horns and strings for the recording. The Temptations had heard the Funk Brothers' tracks and loved them, but were "totally knocked out", according to Otis Williams, when they heard "the finished record with all the strings".

The Temptations added their vocals at Motown's Hitsville USA headquarters. While all five Temptations usually sang lead on singles during the psychedelic soul era, "Just My Imagination" is primarily a showcase for Eddie Kendricks, who sang lead on such Temptations hits as "Get Ready", "The Way You Do the Things You Do", and "You're My Everything". The Temptations remained at Hitsville overnight recording "Just My Imagination", and while the other four members went home at six o'clock in the morning, Kendricks remained in the studio, spending several additional hours recording takes for his lead vocal.

The song was recorded in the midst of a bitter feud between Kendricks and the Temptations' de facto leader, Otis Williams. Dissatisfied and frustrated with Williams' leadership, Kendricks began to withdraw from the group, and picked several fights with either Williams or his best friend, bass singer Melvin Franklin. When Kendricks told his friend ex-Temptation David Ruffin about his problems in the group, Ruffin convinced Kendricks that he should begin a solo career. After a final altercation during a November 1970 Copacabana engagement, both Kendricks and Williams agreed that it would be best for Kendricks to leave the group. By the time "Just My Imagination" was recorded, Williams and Kendricks were no longer on friendly speaking terms. Nevertheless, Williams was impressed by Kendricks' performance on the recording, and in his 1988 Temptations biography referred to "Just My Imagination" as "Eddie's finest moment".

Paul Williams, the Temptations' original lead singer and Kendricks' lifelong best friend, who sings the first line in the bridge ("Every night, on my knees, I pray..."), had suffered for three years from health problems related to alcoholism and sickle-cell disease. By the time "Just My Imagination" was cut, Paul Williams' contributions to the Temptations' recordings had been reduced, and the group had Otis Williams' old associate Richard Street lined up as Paul Williams' replacement. As for Kendricks, he was eventually replaced by Damon Harris, who would be featured in the group's 1972 hit "Papa Was a Rollin' Stone".

== Release and reception ==
Motown released "Just My Imagination" as a single on their Gordy label on January 14, 1971, with the up-tempo psychedelic soul song "You Make Your Own Heaven and Hell Right Here on Earth", from the 1970 Psychedelic Shack LP, as the B-side. The Temptations performed "Just My Imagination" and "Get Ready" for their final appearance on The Ed Sullivan Show, broadcast live on January 31. On-screen, for "Get Ready" Kendricks stood several feet away from the other Temptations, and made little eye contact with them, and for "Just My Imagination" sat on a separate piece of staging; Otis Williams later remarked that one could see the group was no longer a complete unit:

But there was such a bittersweet feeling. Eddie had really changed. Paul was on his last legs. Watch the clip of us doing the song on Ed Sullivan we're not together. Eddie is off by himself. There was no more group. Sure enough, when we played the Copa that week, Eddie left between shows. He didn't come back.

Cash Box described the song as The Temptations' "softest single performance in recent time," stating that it is "exceptional material for markets that generally overlook the team's material."

On February 7, 1971, "Just My Imagination" entered the U.S. Billboard Hot 100 chart at number 71 and later number one on both the Hot 100 and the U.S. Billboard R&B Singles charts. It also became the group's first entry on the Adult Contemporary chart, reaching number 33; the group would not return to that chart until 1984.

The single was included along with "Unite the World" on the Temptations' ninth regular studio album, Sky's the Limit, which included the final Temptations recordings to feature Eddie Kendricks. He began working on his solo album All By Myself shortly before officially leaving the group.

The intended follow-up to "Just My Imagination" was "Smiling Faces Sometimes", on which Kendricks sang lead. When Kendricks left, they released, instead, "I'm the Exception to the Rule", a song in the same vein (featuring Kendricks, Otis Williams and Edwards on lead) which follows "Just My Imagination" on the album. Unable to promote the song because they did not have anyone to do his parts in concert, the song failed miserably so the company pushed the "B-side" – the group's re-recording of "It's Summer", initially the B-side of "Ball of Confusion", at the last-minute, and Norman Whitfield had The Undisputed Truth record "Smiling Faces Sometimes", for whom it was a major hit. The Temptations and Norman Whitfield returned to psychedelic soul for their next album, Solid Rock, whose second single, "Superstar (Remember How You Got Where You Are)", was written by Whitfield and Barrett Strong as an alleged criticism of both Kendricks and David Ruffin.

== Personnel ==
The Temptations

- Eddie Kendricks – lead vocals, first tenor/falsetto
- Paul Williams – solo on bridge, baritone
- Dennis Edwards – first tenor
- Otis Williams – second tenor
- Melvin Franklin – bass vocals

The Rolling Stones

According to the authors Philippe Margotin and Jean-Michel Guesdon.

- Mick Jagger – lead vocals, rhythm guitar
- Keith Richards – rhythm and lead guitar, backing vocals
- Ronnie Wood – lead and rhythm guitar, backing vocals
- Bill Wyman – bass guitar
- Charlie Watts – drums

Additional musician

- Ian McLagan – organ

Technical

- The Glimmer Twins – producers
- Chris Kimsey – engineer
- Barry Sage – assistant engineer
- Ben King – assistant engineer

== Charts ==
=== Weekly charts ===
Weekly chart performance for "Just My Imagination (Running Away with Me)"
Chart (1971)	Peak position
Canada RPM Top Singles	72
UK Singles Chart	8
US Billboard Hot 100	1
US Billboard Adult Contemporary	33
US Billboard R&B	1
US Cash Box Top 100	1

=== Year-end charts ===
Year-end chart performance for "Just My Imagination (Running Away with Me)"
Chart (1971)	Rank
UK	56
US Billboard Hot 100	9
US Cash Box Top 100	7
US R&B/Soul (Billboard)	6

== Certifications ==
Region	Certification	Certified units/sales
United Kingdom (BPI)	Silver	200,000^{‡}
United States (RIAA)	Platinum	1,000,000^{^}
^{^} Shipments figures based on certification alone.^{‡} Sales+streaming figures based on certification alone.
