= Miss You (Rolling Stones song) =

1978 single by the Rolling Stones

Single by the Rolling Stones

from the album Some Girls
- B-side: "Far Away Eyes"
- Released: 10 May 1978
- Recorded: 10 October – 21 December 1977
- Studio: Pathé-Marconi (Paris, France)
- Genre: Disco; soul; disco-rock
- Length: 4:48 (album version); 3:35 (7-inch); 8:26 (12-inch)
- Label: Rolling Stones
- Songwriter: Jagger–Richards
- Producer: The Glimmer Twins

The Rolling Stones singles chronology
"Hot Stuff" (1976)	"Miss You" (1978)	"Beast of Burden" (1978)

Music video
- "Miss You" on YouTube

Some Girls track listing
- 10 tracks Side one: 1. "Miss You"; 2. "When the Whip Comes Down"; 3. "Just My Imagination (Running Away with Me)"; 4. "Some Girls"; 5. "Lies"; Side two: 6. "Far Away Eyes"; 7. "Respectable"; 8. "Before They Make Me Run"; 9. "Beast of Burden"; 10. "Shattered"

"Miss You" is a song by the English rock band the Rolling Stones, released on Rolling Stones Records in May 1978. It was the lead single of their album Some Girls. "Miss You" was written by band members Mick Jagger and Keith Richards.

It peaked at number 1 on the Billboard Hot 100 and number 3 on the UK Singles Chart. An extended version, called the "Special Disco Version", was released as the band's first dance remix on a 12-inch single.

In 2010, Rolling Stone magazine rated "Miss You" number 498 in its list of The 500 Greatest Songs of All Time, dropping down two spots from number 496 in the 2004 version.

== Inspiration and recording ==
"Miss You" was written by Mick Jagger jamming with keyboardist Billy Preston during rehearsals for the March 1977 El Mocambo club gigs, recordings from which appeared on side three of the double live album Love You Live (1977). Keith Richards is credited as co-writer, as was the case for all Rolling Stones originals written by either partner or in tandem.

Jagger and Ronnie Wood insist that "Miss You" wasn't conceived as a disco song, while Richards said, "'Miss You' was a damn good disco record; it was calculated to be one." In any case, what was going on in discotheques did make it to the recording. Charlie Watts said, "A lot of those songs like 'Miss You' on 'Some Girls' ... were heavily influenced by going to the discos. You can hear it in a lot of those four-to-the-floor and the Philadelphia-style drumming."

For the bass part, Bill Wyman started from Preston's bass guitar on the song demo. Chris Kimsey, who engineered the recording, said Wyman went "to quite a few clubs before he got that bass line sorted out", which Kimsey said "made that song". Wyman recalled: "When I did the riff for 'Miss You' – which made the song, and every band in the world copied it for the next year: Rod Stewart, all of them – it still said Jagger/Richard. When I wrote the riff for 'Jumpin' Jack Flash', it became Jagger/Richard, and that's the way it was. It just became part and parcel of the way the band functioned."

Unlike most of Some Girls, "Miss You" features several studio musicians. In addition to Sugar Blue who, according to Wood, was found by Jagger busking on the streets of Paris, Ian McLagan plays understated Wurlitzer electric piano, and Mel Collins provides the tenor saxophone solo for the instrumental break.

The 12-inch single version of the song runs over eight minutes and features additional instrumentation and solos, particularly on guitar. It was remixed by Bob Clearmountain, then an up-and-coming mixer and engineer. This song, the first edit the Stones did for a 12-inch single, also contains tape repeats and an additional set of lyrics in the second verse, after the line "Hey, let's go mess and fool around you know, like we used to". The extended version can be found on The Singles 1971–2006, on the "Don't Stop" CD single and in edited form on the album Rarities 1971–2003 and on the 1990 CD single version of "Angie". The single version is available on Jump Back: The Best of The Rolling Stones, Forty Licks and GRRR!. Some versions of the original 1978 12-inch record were released on pink vinyl.

== Release and legacy ==
"Miss You" became the Rolling Stones' eighth and final number-one single in the United States on its initial release in 1978. It hit the top on 5 August 1978, ending the seven-week reign of "Shadow Dancing" by Andy Gibb. It also reached number three in the United Kingdom. The song was originally nine minutes long but was edited to almost five minutes for the album version and three-and-a-half minutes for the radio single. To properly edit the radio single without audible bumps and glitches, a separate mix was constructed and then edited for continuity. Cash Box said that a "strong, driving, funky backbeat" is suitable for dancing and that "Keith [Richards] provides a wrangling guitar line." Record World said that it was "a rather hushed soul-rocker that is one of their best records in some time" and praised Jagger's vocals.

The B-side of the single was another album track, "Far Away Eyes", a tongue-in-cheek country tune sung by Jagger in a pronounced drawl.

A live recording was captured during the Rolling Stones' 1989–1990 Steel Wheels/Urban Jungle Tour and released on the 1991 live album Flashpoint. Other live versions have been recorded and filmed, including a November 1981 performance included on Let's Spend the Night Together (1983), July 1995 performances released on Totally Stripped (2016), a July 2013 performance on Hyde Park Live, and a March 2016 performance included as a bonus track on Havana Moon.

In 2010, Rolling Stone magazine rated "Miss You" number 498 in its list of The 500 Greatest Songs of All Time, dropping down two spots from number 496 in the 2004 version.

== 2002 Dr. Dre remix ==
In 2002, music producer Dr. Dre released a remix of the track. It was featured in the 2002 film Austin Powers in Goldmember.

== Personnel ==
Personnel taken from the Some Girls CD credits and the authors Philippe Margotin and Jean-Michel Guesdon.

The Rolling Stones

- Mick Jagger – lead and backing vocals, rhythm guitar
- Keith Richards – rhythm guitar, backing vocals
- Ronnie Wood – lead and rhythm guitar, backing vocals
- Bill Wyman – bass guitar
- Charlie Watts – drums

Additional personnel

- Ian McLagan – Wurlitzer electric piano
- Mel Collins – tenor saxophone
- Sugar Blue – harmonica

Technical

- The Glimmer Twins – producers
- Chris Kimsey – engineer
- Barry Sage – assistant engineer
- Ben King – assistant engineer

== Charts ==
=== Weekly charts ===
Chart (1978)	Peak position
Australia (Kent Music Report)	8
Austria (Ö3 Austria Top 40)	13
Belgium (Ultratop 50 Flanders)	3
Canada Dance/Urban (RPM)	4
Canada Top Singles (RPM)	1
Finland (Suomen virallinen lista)	19
Ireland (IRMA)	3
Netherlands (Dutch Top 40)	2
Netherlands (Single Top 100)	3
New Zealand (Recorded Music NZ)	8
Norway (VG-lista)	11
Sweden (Sverigetopplistan)	6
Switzerland (Schweizer Hitparade)	11
UK Singles (Official Charts)	3
US Billboard Hot 100	1
US Billboard Hot Dance Club Play	6
US Billboard Hot Soul Singles	33
US Cash Box	1
US Record World	3
West Germany (GfK)	12

=== Year-end charts ===
Chart (1978)	Position
Australia (Kent Music Report)	41
Belgium (Ultratop 50 Flanders)	29
Canada (RPM 200 Singles)	5
Netherlands (Dutch Top 40)	12
Netherlands (Single Top 100)	37
New Zealand (RIANZ)	42
US Billboard Hot 100	16
US Cash Box	10

== Certifications and sales ==
Region	Certification	Certified units/sales
Australia (ARIA)	Platinum	70,000^{‡}
United Kingdom (BPI)	Silver	250,000^{^}
United States (RIAA)	Gold	1,000,000^{^}
^{^} Shipments figures based on certification alone.^{‡} Sales+streaming figures based on certification alone.

== See also ==
- List of Billboard Hot 100 number-one singles of 1978
- List of Cash Box Top 100 number-one singles of 1978
- List of number-one singles of 1978 (Canada)
