= Shattered (song) =

Song from The Rolling Stones

Single by the Rolling Stones

from the album Some Girls
- B-side: "Everything Is Turning to Gold"
- Released: 29 November 1978 (US)
- Recorded: 10 October – 21 December 1977
- Studio: Pathé Marconi, Paris
- Genre: Punk rock; disco; new wave
- Length: 3:46
- Label: Rolling Stones
- Songwriter: Jagger–Richards
- Producer: The Glimmer Twins

The Rolling Stones singles chronology
"Respectable" (1978)	"Shattered" (1978)	"Emotional Rescue" (1980)

Some Girls track listing
- 10 tracks Side one: 1. "Miss You"; 2. "When the Whip Comes Down"; 3. "Just My Imagination (Running Away with Me)"; 4. "Some Girls"; 5. "Lies"; Side two: 6. "Far Away Eyes"; 7. "Respectable"; 8. "Before They Make Me Run"; 9. "Beast of Burden"; 10. "Shattered"

"Shattered" is a song by the English rock band the Rolling Stones from their 1978 album Some Girls. The song is a reflection of American lifestyles and life in 1970s-era New York City, but also influences from the English punk rock movement can be heard. The B-side, "Everything Is Turning to Gold", was co-written with Ronnie Wood, who contributed lyrics inspired by the birth of his son.

== History ==
Recorded from October to December 1977, "Shattered" features lyrics sung in sprechgesang by Jagger on a guitar riff by Keith Richards. Jagger commented in a Rolling Stone interview that he wrote the lyrics in the back of a New York cab. Most of Richards' guitar work is a basic rhythmic pattern strumming out the alternating tonic and dominant chords with each bar, utilising a relatively modest phaser sound effect for some added depth. Due to the absence of bassist Bill Wyman, the bass track is played by Ronnie Wood.

Billboard stated that the "heavy bottom and...frenetic vocals translate New York's neurotic energy to music." Cash Box said that "the unique rhythmic undercurrents and Mick Jagger's harrowing chant-like vocals of life in the big Apple make this a top pop winner." Record World called it "rock 'n' roll funk with a flourish."

In the United States, "Shattered" climbed to number 31 on the Billboard Hot 100.

== Personnel ==
Personnel per Some Girls CD credits and the authors Philippe Margotin and Jean-Michel Guesdon.

The Rolling Stones

- Mick Jagger – lead and backing vocals
- Keith Richards – backing vocals, rhythm guitar
- Ronnie Wood – backing vocals, rhythm and lead guitar, pedal steel, bass guitar, bass drum
- Charlie Watts – drums

Additional musicians

- Simon Kirke – congas
- Unknown musician(s) – percussion and hand claps

Technical

- The Glimmer Twins – producers
- Chris Kimsey – engineer
- Barry Sage – assistant engineer
- Ben King – assistant engineer

Note: Margotin and Guesdon are unsure if it was Kirke who played congas. They also place a (?) next to Wood's bass drum part.

== Chart performance ==
Chart (1978)	Peak position
US Billboard Hot 100	31

== In popular culture ==
In 2003 the song was featured on the soundtrack of the major motion picture S.W.A.T. starring actors Colin Farrell and Samuel L. Jackson. The song plays while Farrell's character Officer Jim Street exercises on a rainy Los Angeles beach.

During a 2013 fundraiser, Eddie Vedder played the guitar while Jeanne Tripplehorn sang "Shattered" doing a Julie Andrews impression. The title of the June 2019 book Can't Give It Away on Seventh Avenue: The Rolling Stones and New York City comes from a lyric in the song.
