= Far Away Eyes =

- Back cover of "Miss You" / "Far Away Eyes"

Single by the Rolling Stones

from the album Some Girls
- A-side: "Miss You"
- Released: 9 June 1978
- Recorded: 10 October – 21 December 1977
- Studio: Pathé Marconi, Paris
- Genre: Country, bakersfield sound
- Length: 4:24
- Label: Rolling Stones/Virgin
- Songwriter: Jagger/Richards
- Producer: The Glimmer Twins

Official video
- "Far Away Eyes" on YouTube

"Far Away Eyes" is the sixth track from the English rock band the Rolling Stones' 1978 album, Some Girls. It was released, as the B-side of the single "Miss You" on Rolling Stones Records, on 9 June 1978. Rolling Stone magazine made it the 73rd song on their list of 100 Greatest Rolling Stone's Songs.

== Origin ==
Mick Jagger and Keith Richards collaborated extensively on writing and composing the song, which was recorded in late 1977. A bootleg version with Richards singing exists. The Stones, longtime country music fans, incorporated many aspects of Bakersfield-style country music into this song. These included in particular Ronnie Wood's use of a pedal steel guitar for a solo and highlights, an instrument used on other songs from the album such as "Shattered" and "When the Whip Comes Down". Also of note is the plodding rhythm of Charlie Watts and Bill Wyman. Richards performed acoustic and electric guitars as well as sharing piano duties with Jagger.

== Content ==
In the lyrics, the loneliness of life and the possibilities in finding love are dealt with:

So if you're down on your luck and you can't harmonize
Find a girl with far away eyes
And if you're downright disgusted and life ain't worth a dime
Get a girl with far away eyes.

The verses of the song are half sung, half spoken, with Jagger using a parodic Southern accent:

I was driving home early Sunday morning through Bakersfield
Listening to gospel music on the coloured radio station
And the preacher said, 'You know, you always have the Lord by your side'
Well, I was so pleased to be informed of this that I ran twenty red lights in His honor
Thank you, Jesus. Thank you, Lord.

In a 1978 interview with Rolling Stone magazine, Jagger said: "You know, when you drive through Bakersfield on a Sunday morning or Sunday evening—I did that about six months ago—all the country music radio stations start broadcasting black gospel services live from L.A. And that's what the song refers to. But the song's really about driving alone, listening to the radio." On influences, Jagger stated: "I wouldn't say this song was influenced specifically by Gram (Parsons). That idea of country music played slightly tongue-in-cheek—Gram had that in 'Drugstore Truck Drivin' Man', and we have that sardonic quality, too." Asked by the interviewer if the girl in the song was a real one, Jagger replied, "Yeah, she's real, she's a real girl."

== Live performances ==
The Rolling Stones performed "Far Away Eyes" at every concert of their U.S. Tour 1978. It is performed in the concert film, Some Girls: Live in Texas '78, featuring fiddle player Doug "the Ragin' Cajun" Kershaw. Since that time, the song has been performed sporadically. A live recording from July 1995 was included on the album Totally Stripped (2016), and a performance from the Stones' 2006 A Bigger Bang Tour appeared in the 2008 concert film, Shine a Light, and on the accompanying live album. On 20 May 2013, the song was performed in Los Angeles as part of the Stones' "50 & Counting Tour". During their Zip Code Tour the Stones performed "Far Away Eyes" at LP Field in Nashville, Tennessee on 17 June 2015. The Rolling Stones performed the song for the first time live since 2015—as the "vote song" chosen by the audience—at Raymond James Stadium in Tampa, Florida as part of their No Filter Tour.

The song has been covered by The Handsome Family on their 2002 album Smothered and Covered.

== Promotional video ==
The official promotional video was directed by Michael Lindsay-Hogg, who directed several other videos for the band, including those for "Start Me Up", "Jumpin' Jack Flash", and "Fool to Cry". Lindsay-Hogg also directed promotional videos for the Beatles, the Who, and Paul McCartney and Wings.

== Personnel ==
According to the authors Philippe Margotin and Jean-Michel Guesdon.

The Rolling Stones

- Mick Jagger – lead and backing vocals, piano
- Keith Richards – electric rhythm guitar, acoustic guitar, piano, backing vocals
- Ronnie Wood – pedal steel guitar, backing vocals
- Bill Wyman – bass guitar
- Charlie Watts – drums

Technical

- The Glimmer Twins – producers
- Chris Kimsey – engineer
- Barry Sage – assistant engineer
- Ben King – assistant engineer
