= The Rolling Stones discography =

Catalogue of published recordings by the Rolling Stones

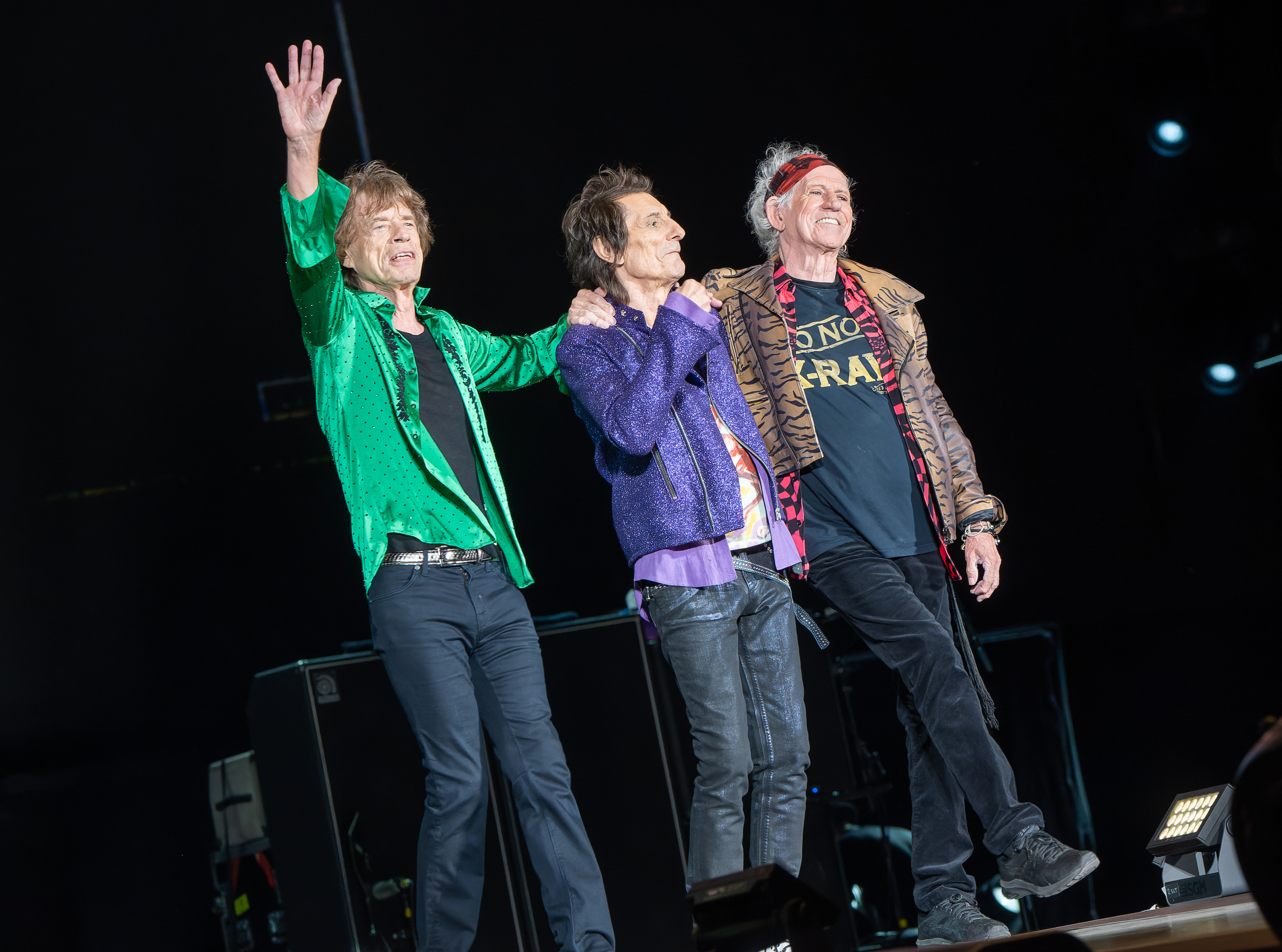
- The Rolling Stones in 2022
- Studio albums: 25 (UK), 27 (US)
- Extended plays: 3
- Live albums: 39
- Compilation albums: 28
- Singles: 125
- Video albums: 51
- Music videos: 80
- Box sets: 14
- Reissue box sets: 17
- Video box sets: 3

The English rock group the Rolling Stones have released 25 studio albums, (27 in the US), 12 contemporary live albums, 27 archival live albums, 28 compilation albums, 3 extended plays, 125 singles, 31 box sets, 51 video albums, 3 video box sets and 80 music videos. Throughout their career, they have sold over 250 million albums worldwide. The Rolling Stones have scored 38 top-10 albums (9 No. 1 albums) on the Billboard 200 and 8 No. 1 hits on the Billboard Hot 100. According to the Recording Industry Association of America, they have sold 66.5 million albums in the US, making them the 16th best-selling group in history.

From 1963 to 1970, the band were signed to Decca Records in the United Kingdom, and Decca's subsidiary label London Records in the United States. During 1971 to 1992, the band ran their own record company, Rolling Stones Records, distributed by WEA (UK 1971 to 1977, US 1971 to 1984), EMI (UK 1978 to 1984) and CBS (1985 to 1992). They were then signed to Virgin Records from 1993 to 2006, and Universal Music Group since 2007. The band maintain ownership of their catalogue from 1971 onwards, while the pre-1971 catalogue is owned by ABKCO Records.

Before 1967, it was common practice for British releases to be reconfigured for the American market. In some cases, the US version would be an entirely different album with different tracks, cover photos and liner notes. The first five British Rolling Stones studio albums were converted into seven studio albums for the American market, adding material from singles and the UK EPs (for example, the tracks on the band's third British album Out of Our Heads (1965) were spread across three American albums – Now!, Out of Our Heads and December's Children (And Everybody's) (all 1965). The first two greatest hits albums, Big Hits (High Tide and Green Grass) (1966) and Through the Past, Darkly (Big Hits Vol. 2) (1969), also differ in each nation. The 1966 live album Got Live If You Want It! and the 1967 compilation album Flowers were US-only releases. Studio and live albums starting with Their Satanic Majesties Request, released in December 1967, are uniform in both the UK and the US, although compilation albums still sometimes vary.

== Albums ==
=== Studio albums ===
List of albums, with selected chart positions and certifications
Title	Album details	Peak chart positions										Certifications
Title	Album details	UK	AUS	CAN	FRA	GER	JPN	NLD	NOR	SWE	US	Certifications
The Rolling Stones (UK)	Released: 17 April 1964; Label: Decca	1	1	—	—	2	—	—	—	—	—	
England's Newest Hit Makers (US)	Released: 29 May 1964; Label: London	—	—	—	—	—	—	—	—	—	11	MC: Platinum; RIAA: Gold
12 × 5 (US)	Released: 17 October 1964; Label: London	—	2	2	—	—	—	—	—	—	3	RIAA: Gold
The Rolling Stones No. 2 (UK)	Released: 15 January 1965; Label: Decca	1	—	—	—	1	—	—	—	—	—	
The Rolling Stones, Now! (US)	Released: 13 February 1965; Label: London	—	2	2	—	—	—	—	—	—	5	RIAA: Gold
Out of Our Heads (US)	Released: July 1965; Label: London	—	—	1	—	—	—	—	—	—	1	RIAA: Platinum
Out of Our Heads (UK)	Released: 24 September 1965; Label: Decca	2	2	—	—	2	—	—	—	—	—	
December's Children (And Everybody's) (US)	Released: November 1965; Label: London	—	—	1	—	—	—	—	—	—	4	RIAA: Gold
Aftermath (UK)	Released: 15 April 1966; Label: Decca	1	2	—	—	1	—	—	—	—	—	BPI: Gold
Aftermath (US)	Released: June 1966; Label: London	—	—	1	—	—	—	—	—	—	2	RIAA: Platinum
Between the Buttons (UK)	Released: 20 January 1967; Label: Decca	3	7	—	—	2	—	—	2	—	—	
Between the Buttons (US)	Released: 23 January 1967; Label: London	—	—	2	—	—	—	—	—	—	2	RIAA: Gold
Their Satanic Majesties Request	Released: 8 December 1967; Label: Decca (UK), London (US)	3	1	—	—	4	99	—	2	—	2	BPI: Silver; RIAA: Gold
Beggars Banquet	Released: 6 December 1968; Label: Decca (UK), London (US)	3	3	3	197	8	124	—	2	16	5	BPI: Gold; ARIA: Gold; MC: Gold; RIAA: Platinum
Let It Bleed	Released: 28 November 1969; Label: Decca (UK), London (US)	1	2	4	138	3	11	1	2	5	3	BPI: Platinum; ARIA: Platinum; MC: Platinum; NVPI: Gold; RIAA: 2× Platinum
Sticky Fingers	Released: 23 April 1971; Label: Rolling Stones	1	1	1	11	1	9	1	1	4	1	BPI: Platinum; ARIA: Gold; IFPI NOR: Gold; MC: Platinum; RIAA: 3× Platinum; SNEP: Gold
Exile on Main St.	Released: 12 May 1972; Label: Rolling Stones	1	2	1	97	2	7	1	1	1	1	BPI: Platinum; ARIA: Platinum; RIAA: Platinum
Goats Head Soup	Released: 31 August 1973; Label: Rolling Stones	1	1	1	—	2	7	1	1	2	1	BPI: Gold; BVMI: Gold; GLF: Gold; MC: Platinum; NVPI: Gold; RIAA: 3× Platinum; SNEP: Gold
It's Only Rock 'n Roll	Released: 18 October 1974; Label: Rolling Stones	2	7	5	—	12	29	5	3	3	1	BPI: Gold; MC: Platinum; RIAA: Platinum
Black and Blue	Released: 23 April 1976; Label: Rolling Stones	2	4	2	—	15	32	1	2	6	1	BPI: Gold; MC: Gold; RIAA: Platinum
Some Girls	Released: 9 June 1978; Label: Rolling Stones	2	3	1	61	6	11	3	3	3	1	BPI: Gold; NVPI: Platinum; RIAA: 6× Platinum; RIAJ: Gold; SNEP: Gold
Emotional Rescue	Released: 23 June 1980; Label: Rolling Stones	1	4	1	—	2	10	1	4	1	1	BPI: Gold; ARIA: Platinum; NVPI: Gold; RIAA: 2× Platinum; RIAJ: Gold; SNEP: Gold
Tattoo You	Released: 24 August 1981; Label: Rolling Stones	2	1	1	—	3	8	1	3	3	1	BPI: Gold; ARIA: 2× Platinum; GLF: Gold; MC: 4× Platinum; NVPI: Gold; RIAA: 4× Platinum; RIAJ: Gold; SNEP: Gold
Undercover	Released: 7 November 1983; Label: Rolling Stones	3	3	2	—	2	12	1	3	1	4	BPI: Gold; GLF: Gold; RIAA: Platinum; RIAJ: Gold
Dirty Work	Released: 24 March 1986; Label: Rolling Stones	4	2	2	9	2	6	1	3	4	4	BPI: Gold; ARIA: Platinum; BVMI: Gold; MC: Platinum; NVPI: Gold; RIAA: Platinum; SNEP: Gold
Steel Wheels	Released: 29 August 1989; Label: Rolling Stones	2	7	1	6	2	5	2	1	2	3	BPI: Gold; ARIA: Platinum; BVMI: Gold; GLF: Gold; MC: 3× Platinum; NVPI: Gold; RIAA: 2× Platinum; RIAJ: Gold; SNEP: 2× Gold
Voodoo Lounge	Released: 11 July 1994; Label: Virgin	1	1	1	2	1	2	1	3	2	2	BPI: Gold; ARIA: Gold; BVMI: Platinum; GLF: Gold; IFPI NOR: Gold; MC: 3× Platinum; NVPI: Platinum; RIAA: 2× Platinum; RIAJ: Gold; SNEP: 2× Gold
Bridges to Babylon	Released: 29 September 1997; Label: Virgin	6	19	2	2	1	10	2	1	1	3	BPI: Gold; BVMI: Platinum; GLF: Gold; IFPI NOR: Gold; MC: Platinum; NVPI: Platinum; RIAA: Platinum; RIAJ: Platinum; SNEP: 2× Gold
A Bigger Bang	Released: 5 September 2005; Label: Virgin	2	4	1	3	1	5	1	2	1	3	BPI: Gold; BVMI: Platinum; GLF: Gold; MC: Platinum; NVPI: Gold; RIAA: Platinum; RIAJ: Gold; SNEP: Gold
Blue & Lonesome	Released: 2 December 2016; Label: Polydor	1	3	2	2	1	3	1	1	1	4	BPI: Platinum; ARIA: Gold; BVMI: 3× Gold; MC: Gold; NVPI: 2× Platinum; SNEP: 2× Platinum
Hackney Diamonds	Released: 20 October 2023; Label: Polydor	1	1	8	1	1	5	1	1	1	3	BPI: Gold; BVMI: Platinum; NVPI: Platinum; SNEP: Platinum
Foreign Tongues	Released: 10 July 2026; Label: Polydor	1	2	7	1	1	5	1	1	1	7	
"—" denotes recordings that did not chart or were not released in that territory.

=== Contemporary live albums ===
Title	Album details	Peak chart positions										Certifications
Title	Album details	UK	AUS	CAN	FRA	GER	JPN	NLD	NOR	SWE	US	Certifications
Got Live If You Want It! (US)	Released: 28 November 1966; Label: London	—	—	2	—	2	75	—	—	—	6	RIAA: Gold
Get Yer Ya-Ya's Out!	Released: 4 September 1970; Label: Decca (UK), London (US)	1	2	3	—	6	30	2	3	7	6	BPI: Silver; MC: Gold; RIAA: Platinum
Love You Live	Released: 23 September 1977; Label: Rolling Stones	3	10	3	—	22	11	2	10	15	5	BPI: Gold; RIAA: Gold
Still Life	Released: 1 June 1982; Label: Rolling Stones	4	10	2	—	4	14	1	3	1	5	BPI: Gold; MC: Platinum; RIAA: Platinum
Flashpoint	Released: 8 April 1991; Label: Rolling Stones	6	12	9	4	5	4	5	11	15	16	BPI: Gold; BVMI: Gold; MC: Gold; NVPI: Platinum; RIAA: Gold; RIAJ: Gold
Stripped	Released: 13 November 1995; Label: Virgin	9	7	1	4	3	12	2	1	15	9	BPI: Gold; ARIA: Gold; BVMI: Gold; IFPI NOR: Platinum; NVPI: Gold; RIAA: Platinum; RIAJ: Gold
No Security	Released: 2 November 1998; Label: Virgin	67	—	—	7	5	14	15	19	22	34	
Live Licks	Released: 1 November 2004; Label: Virgin	38	—	—	38	9	19	19	38	16	50	BPI: Gold; RIAA: Gold
Shine a Light	Released: 1 April 2008; Label: Polydor	2	28	9	27	7	10	7	10	6	11	BPI: Gold
Sweet Summer Sun	Released: 22 July 2013 (digital download titled Hyde Park Live), 11 November 2013 (physical); Label: Eagle	16	37	20	23	2	—	1	2	33	19	BPI: Silver
Sticky Fingers Live	Released: 29 June 2015; Label: Polydor; Digital download exclusive to Google Music	149	—	—	—	—	—	—	—	—	92	
Havana Moon	Released: 11 November 2016; Label: Eagle	—	—	—	—	4	—	12	—	—	—	
"—" denotes recordings that did not chart or were not released in that territory.

=== Archival live albums ===
Title	Album details	Peak chart positions									
Title	Album details	UK	AUS	CAN	FRA	GER	JPN	NLD	NOR	SWE	US
The Rolling Stones Rock and Roll Circus December 11 1968	Released: 14 October 1996; Label: Decca	—	46	—	—	55	52	25	—	34	92
Brussels Affair (Live 1973)	Released: 18 October 2011; Label: Promotone BV; Digital download exclusive to Google Music	—	—	—	—	—	—	—	—	—	—
Some Girls: Live in Texas '78	Released: 15 November 2011; Label: Eagle	—	—	—	194	34	106	61	—	—	—
Hampton Coliseum (Live 1981)	Released: 30 January 2012; Label: Promotone BV; Digital download exclusive to Google Music	—	—	—	—	19	—	—	—	—	120
L.A. Friday (Live 1975)	Released: 2 April 2012; Label: Promotone BV; Digital download exclusive to Google Music	—	—	—	—	19	—	—	—	—	—
Live at the Checkerboard Lounge, Chicago 1981	Released: 2 July 2012; Label: Eagle	—	—	—	—	22	—	34	—	—	—
Live at the Tokyo Dome (Live 1990)	Released: 11 July 2012; Label: Promotone BV; Digital download exclusive to Google Music	—	—	—	—	21	—	25	—	—	—
Light the Fuse (Live 2005)	Released: 16 October 2012; Label: Promotone BV; Digital download exclusive to Google Music	—	—	—	—	—	—	—	—	—	—
Live at Leeds (Live 1982)	Released: 13 November 2012; Label: Promotone BV; Digital download exclusive to Google Music	—	—	—	—	43	—	29	—	—	—
Live 1965: Music from Charlie Is My Darling	Released: 24 November 2014; Label: ABKCO; Digital download	—	—	—	—	—	—	—	—	—	—
The Marquee Club Live in 1971 (From the Vault Collection)	Released: 22 June 2015; Label: Eagle	—	—	—	—	17	—	23	29	—	—
Totally Stripped	Released: 3 June 2016; Label: Eagle	198	—	—	—	7	—	2	—	—	—
Ladies & Gentlemen: The Rolling Stones	Released: 16 June 2017; Label: Eagle	—	—	—	—	—	—	—	—	—	—
Sticky Fingers Live at Fonda Theatre 2015 (From the Vault Collection)	Released: 29 September 2017; Label: Eagle	—	—	—	—	10	—	17	—	—	—
On Air	Released: 1 December 2017; Label: Polydor	27	—	58	—	—	—	—	—	—	47
No Security San Jose '99 (From the Vault Collection)	Released: 13 July 2018; Label: Eagle	—	—	—	178	6	—	15	—	—	—
Voodoo Lounge Uncut	Released: 16 November 2018; Label: Eagle	—	—	—	147	—	10	27	—	—	—
Bridges to Bremen	Released: 21 June 2019; Label: Eagle	—	—	—	132	6	—	21	—	—	—
Bridges to Buenos Aires	Released: 8 November 2019; Label: Eagle	—	—	—	141	15	—	25	—	—	—
Steel Wheels Live Atlantic City, New Jersey	Released: 25 September 2020; Label: Eagle	—	—	—	132	2	—	9	—	—	180
A Bigger Bang Live on Copacabana Beach	Released: 12 June 2021 (digital download), 9 July 2021 (physical); Label: Mercury	187	—	—	80	2	—	6	—	—	—
El Mocambo 1977	Released: 13 May 2022; Label: Polydor	24	91	—	—	5	8	4	—	34	61
Licked Live in NYC	Released: 10 June 2022; Label: Mercury	—	—	—	99	7	—	8	—	—	—
Grrr Live!	Released: 10 February 2023; Label: Mercury	21	96	—	55	3	—	2	—	—	193
Live at the Wiltern	Released: 8 March 2024; Label: Mercury	95	—	—	111	4	—	4	—	—	—
Live at Racket, NYC	Released: 20 April 2024; Label: Polydor	—	—	—	—	—	—	35	—	—	—
Welcome to Shepherd's Bush	Released: 6 December 2024; Label: Polydor	—	—	—	151	6	—	11	—	—	—
"—" denotes recordings that did not chart or were not released in that territory.

=== Compilation albums ===
==== Main compilation albums ====
Title	Album details	Peak chart positions										Certifications
Title	Album details	UK	AUS	CAN	FRA	GER	JPN	NLD	NOR	SWE	US	Certifications
Big Hits (High Tide and Green Grass) (US)	Released: 28 March 1966; Label: London	—	—	1	—	—	—	—	—	—	3	RIAA: 2× Platinum; MC: Gold
Big Hits (High Tide and Green Grass) (UK)	Released: 4 November 1966; Label: Decca	4	7	—	—	—	84	—	5	49	—	BPI: Silver
Flowers (US)	Released: 26 June 1967; Label: London	—	—	5	—	7	—	—	3	—	3	RIAA: Gold
Through the Past, Darkly (Big Hits Vol. 2) (UK)	Released: 12 September 1969; Label: Decca	2	9	—	—	13	118	5	10	—	—	BPI: Gold
Through the Past, Darkly (Big Hits Vol. 2) (US)	Released: 12 September 1969; Label: London	—	—	2	—	—	—	—	—	—	2	RIAA: Platinum
Stone Age (UK)	Released: March 1971; Label: Decca	4	—	51	—	30	—	19	15	—	—	
Gimme Shelter (UK)	Released: 16 August 1971; Label: Decca	19	—	—	—	—	30	—	—	—	—	
Hot Rocks 1964–1971	Released: 20 December 1971 (US), 1 June 1990 (UK); Label: ABKCO/London	3	10	11	—	—	80	9	—	—	4	BPI: 2× Platinum; ARIA: 3× Platinum; RIAA: Diamond (12× Platinum)
Milestones (UK)	Released: 18 February 1972; Label: Decca	14	47	—	—	—	—	—	20	—	—	
Rock 'n' Rolling Stones (UK)	Released: 13 October 1972; Label: Decca	41	49	—	—	—	—	—	—	—	—	
More Hot Rocks (Big Hits & Fazed Cookies) (US)	Released: 11 December 1972; Label: ABKCO	—	—	3	—	—	—	—	—	—	9	RIAA: Gold
No Stone Unturned (UK)	Released: 5 October 1973; Label: Decca	—	—	—	—	—	—	—	—	—	—	
Metamorphosis	Released: 6 June 1975; Label: ABKCO	45	51	38	—	—	—	—	—	11	8	
Made in the Shade	Released: 6 June 1975; Label: Rolling Stones	14	71	43	—	—	—	—	—	11	6	RIAA: Platinum
Rolled Gold: The Very Best of the Rolling Stones (UK)	Released: 14 November 1975; Label: Decca	7	13	—	—	86	115	66	30	27	—	BPI: Gold
Get Stoned (30 Greatest Hits) (UK)	Released: October 1977; Label: Arcade	8	—	—	—	21	—	—	—	18	—	
Time Waits for No One: Anthology 1971–1977 (UK)	Released: 29 May 1979; Label: Rolling Stones	—	98	—	—	—	—	—	—	—	—	
Solid Rock (UK)	Released: 10 October 1980; Label: Decca	—	—	—	—	—	—	—	—	—	—	
Sucking in the Seventies	Released: March 1981; Label: Rolling Stones	—	39	15	—	64	—	35	34	—	15	RIAA: Gold
Slow Rollers (UK)	Released: November 1981; Label: Decca	—	60	—	—	—	—	—	—	—	—	
Story of The Stones (UK)	Released: November 1982; Label: K-tel	24	—	—	—	—	—	—	—	—	—	BPI: Gold
Rewind (1971–1984)	Released: 25 June 1984; Label: Rolling Stones	23	—	78	—	31	—	2	—	—	86	RIAA: Gold; NVPI: Gold
Singles Collection: The London Years	Released: 15 August 1989; Label: ABKCO	138	—	—	—	28	5	8	28	10	91	BPI: Gold; ARIA: Gold; RIAA: Platinum
Jump Back: The Best of The Rolling Stones '71–'93	Released: 22 November 1993 (UK), 24 August 2004 (US); Label: Virgin	16	9	66	6	19	37	10	15	10	30	BPI: 2× Platinum; ARIA: 4× Platinum; BVMI: Gold; GLF: Platinum; RIAA: Platinum
Forty Licks	Released: 30 September 2002; Label: Virgin/ABKCO/Decca	2	3	2	—	2	4	2	2	2	2	BPI: 4× Platinum; ARIA: 2× Platinum; BVMI: Platinum; GLF: Gold; MC: 5× Platinum; RIAA: 4× Platinum; RIAJ: Platinum
Rarities 1971–2003	Released: 22 November 2005; Label: Virgin	133	—	—	110	80	67	59	—	56	76	
GRRR!	Released: 12 November 2012; Label: ABKCO/Universal	3	1	18	1	1	12	4	5	9	19	BPI: Platinum; ARIA: 2× Platinum; BVMI: Gold; RIAA: Gold
Honk	Released: 19 April 2019; Label: Promotone BV/Universal	8	15	38	26	6	21	12	—	—	23	BPI: Gold
"—" denotes recordings that did not chart or were not released in that territory.

==== Other charting compilation albums ====
Title	Album details	Peak chart positions							
Title	Album details	UK	FIN	GER	JPN	NLD	SPA	SWE	US
Around and Around (Europe)	Released: September 1964; Label: Decca	—	—	4	—	—	—	5	—
Bravo (Germany)	Released: December 1965; Label: Hörzu	—	—	1	—	—	—	—	—
Great Hits (Europe)	Released: 1969; Label: Decca	—	12	—	—	—	—	—	—
Golden Prize (Japan)	Released: 10 June 1970; Label: London	—	—	—	23	—	—	—	—
Double Deluxe (Japan)	Released: 10 November 1970; Label: London	—	—	—	37	—	—	—	—
The Best The Rolling Stones (Japan)	Released: 10 September 1971; Label: London	—	—	—	18	—	—	—	—
Com Pack (Japan)	Released: 10 November 1971; Label: London	—	—	—	55	—	—	—	—
Max 20 (Japan)	Released: 15 November 1971; Label: London	—	—	—	62	—	—	—	—
Lo mejor de The Rolling Stones (Spain)	Released: 1972; Label: Decca	—	—	—	—	—	6	—	—
Live! The Rolling Stones Deluxe (Japan)	Released: 15 January 1973; Label: London	—	—	—	75	—	—	—	—
The Rolling Stones (Japan)	Released: 10 November 1973; Label: London	—	—	—	91	—	—	—	—
Stones Story (Netherlands)	Released: May 1976; Label: Decca	—	—	—	—	59	—	—	—
Best of the Rolling Stones (Finland)	Released: 1980; Label: Decca	—	4	—	—	—	—	—	—
Stones Story 2 (Netherlands)	Released: 1981; Label: Decca	—	—	—	—	72	—	—	—
Stones Story 3 (Netherlands)	Released: 1981; Label: Decca	—	—	—	—	70	—	—	—
In Concert (Europe)	Released: July 1982; Label: Decca; Double album repackage of Got Live If You Want It! and Get Yer Ya-Ya's Out!	97 (Note: In Concert charted in the UK as an import.)	—	—	—	—	—	—	—
Heartbreakers – 19 Love Songs (Netherlands)	Released: July 1982; Label: Philips	—	—	—	—	4	—	—	—
Star Box (Japan)	Released: 10 June 1989; Label: CBS/Sony	—	—	—	10	—	—	—	—
Another Side of Steel Wheels (Japan)	Released: 21 March 1990; Label: Rolling Stones	—	—	—	21	—	—	—	—
Exile on Main St – Rarities Edition (US)	Released: 18 May 2010; Label: Target; Outtakes from Exile on Main St, sold exclusively at Target stores	—	—	—	—	—	—	—	27
"—" denotes recordings that did not chart or were not released in that territory.

== Extended plays ==
Title	EP details	Peak chart positions		
Title	EP details	UK	AUS	NLD
The Rolling Stones (UK)	Released: 10 January 1964; Label: Decca	1	—	—
Five by Five (UK)	Released: 14 August 1964; Label: Decca	1	17	—
Route 66 (Australia)	Released: January 1965; Label: Decca	—	9	—
Got Live If You Want It! (UK)	Released: 11 June 1965; Label: Decca	1	65	9
"—" denotes recordings that did not chart or were not released in that territory.

== Singles ==
=== 1960s ===
Title (A-side/B-side)	Year	Peak chart positions										Certifications	First UK album	First US album
Title (A-side/B-side)	Year	UK	AUS	CAN	GER	IRE	ITA	NLD	NOR	SWE	US	Certifications	First UK album	First US album
"Come On" "I Want to Be Loved"	1963	21 —	— —	— —	— —	— —	— —	— —	— —	— —	— —		A-side: Big Hits (High Tide and Green Grass) B-side: Singles Collection: The London Years	A-side: More Hot Rocks (Big Hits & Fazed Cookies) B-side: Singles Collection: The London Years
"I Wanna Be Your Man" "Stoned"	1963	12 —	— —	— —	— —	— —	— —	— —	— —	— —	— —		A-side: Singles Collection: The London Years B-side: No Stone Unturned	Singles Collection: The London Years
"Not Fade Away" "Little by Little" (UK) "I Wanna Be Your Man" (US)	1964	3 — —	33 — —	22 — —	— — —	5 — —	— — —	— — —	— — —	17 — —	48 — —		A-side: Big Hits (High Tide and Green Grass) UK B-side: The Rolling Stones US B-side: Singles Collection: The London Years	A-side & UK B-side: England's Newest Hit Makers US B-side: Singles Collection: The London Years
"Poison Ivy" "You Better Move On" Australia and Hong Kong single (Note: "Poison Ivy" was initially set for release in the UK with the B-side "Fortune Teller" in July 1963, but the single was withdrawn.)	1964	— —	94	— —	— —	— —	— —	— —	— —	— —	— —		A-side: No Stone Unturned B-side: Through the Past, Darkly (Big Hits Vol. 2)	A-side: More Hot Rocks (Big Hits & Fazed Cookies) B-side: December's Children (And Everybody's)
"Tell Me (You're Coming Back)" "I Just Wanna Make Love to You" Not released in the UK	1964	— —	32 —	7 —	22 —	— —	— —	3 —	— —	1 —	24 —		The Rolling Stones	England's Newest Hit Makers
"It's All Over Now" "Good Times, Bad Times"	1964	1 —	9 —	26 —	14 —	2 —	— —	1 —	5 —	3 —	26 —		A-side: Big Hits (High Tide and Green Grass) B-side: Get Stoned	12 × 5
"Time Is on My Side" "Congratulations" Not released in the UK	1964	— —	4	3 —	28 —	— —	— —	6 —	— —	15 —	6 —		A-side: The Rolling Stones No. 2 B-side: No Stone Unturned	12 × 5
"Little Red Rooster" "Off the Hook"	1964	1 —	2 —	— —	14 —	4 —	— —	4 —	6 —	6 —	— —		A-side: Big Hits (High Tide and Green Grass) B-side: The Rolling Stones No. 2	The Rolling Stones, Now!
"Heart of Stone" "What a Shame" Not released in the UK	1964	— —	5	15 —	— —	— —	— —	8 —	— —	— —	19; 124		A-side: Out of Our Heads B-side: The Rolling Stones No. 2	The Rolling Stones, Now!
"Under the Boardwalk" "Walking the Dog" (Australia) Australia, South Africa and Rhodesia single	1965	— —	1	— —	— —	— —	— —	— —	— —	— —	— —		A-side: The Rolling Stones No. 2 B-side: The Rolling Stones	A-side: 12 × 5 B-side: England's Newest Hitmakers
"The Last Time" "Play with Fire"	1965	1 —	2	9 —	1 —	2 —	— —	1 —	1 —	1 —	9; 96		A-side: Big Hits (High Tide and Green Grass) B-side: Hot Rocks 1964–1971	Out of Our Heads
"(I Can't Get No) Satisfaction" "The Spider and the Fly" (UK) "The Under Assistant West Coast Promotion Man" (US)	1965	1 — —	1 — —	3 — —	1 — —	1 — —	8 — —	1 — —	1 — —	1 — —	1 — —	BPI: Platinum; ARIA: 3× Platinum; BVMI: Gold; FIMI: Platinum; RIAA: Gold	A-side: Big Hits (High Tide and Green Grass) UK B-side: Stone Age US B-side: Out of Our Heads	Out of Our Heads
"Get Off of My Cloud" "The Singer Not the Song" (UK) "I'm Free" (US)	1965	1 — —	2 — —	1 — —	1 — —	2 — —	— — —	2 — —	2 — —	2 — —	1 — —		A-side: Big Hits (High Tide and Green Grass) UK B-side: No Stone Unturned US B-side: Out of Our Heads	December's Children (And Everybody's)
"As Tears Go By" "Gotta Get Away" Not released in the UK	1965	— —	— —	1 —	— —	— —	— —	— —	— —	— —	6 —		A-side: Big Hits (High Tide and Green Grass) B-side: Out of Our Heads	December's Children (And Everybody's)
"19th Nervous Breakdown" "As Tears Go By" (UK) "Sad Day" (US)	1966	2 — —	2; 2 —	9 — —	1 — —	2 — —	7 — —	2; 2 —	2 — —	5; 5 —	2 — —		A-side & UK B-side: Big Hits (High Tide and Green Grass) US B-side: No Stone Unturned	A-side: Big Hits (High Tide and Green Grass) UK B-side: December's Children (and Everybody's) US B-side: Singles Collection: The London Years
"Fortune Teller" "Sad Day" Australia single	1966	— —	5	— —	— —	— —	— —	— —	— —	— —	— —		A-side: Saturday Club (various artists album) B-side: No Stone Unturned	A-side: More Hot Rocks (Big Hits & Fazed Cookies) B-side: Singles Collection: The London Years
"Paint It Black" "Long, Long While" (UK) "Stupid Girl" (US)	1966	1 — —	1 — —	1 — —	2 — —	2 — —	4 — —	1 — —	2 — —	2 — —	1 — —	BPI: 3× Platinum; ARIA: 5× Platinum; BVMI: Platinum; FIMI: Platinum	A-side: Big Hits (High Tide and Green Grass) UK B-side: No Stone Unturned US B-side: Aftermath	A-side & US B-side: Aftermath UK B-side: More Hot Rocks (Big Hits & Fazed Cookies)
"Mother's Little Helper" "Lady Jane" Not released in the UK	1966	— —	10	14 —	9 —	— —	— 10	5	— —	13 —	8; 24		Aftermath	A-side: Flowers B-side: Aftermath
"Have You Seen Your Mother, Baby, Standing in the Shadow?" "Who's Driving Your Plane?"	1966	5 —	24 —	8 —	9 —	5 —	14 —	2 —	6 —	9 —	9 —		A-side: Big Hits (High Tide and Green Grass) B-side: No Stone Unturned	A-side: Flowers B-side: Singles Collection: The London Years
"Let's Spend the Night Together" "Ruby Tuesday"	1967	3	3	— 2	1 —	14; 6	6; 7	1	2 —	6 —	55; 1	"Ruby Tuesday": BPI: Silver; ARIA: Gold; RIAA: Gold	Through the Past, Darkly (Big Hits Vol. 2)	Between the Buttons
"We Love You" "Dandelion"	1967	8	4	— 9	2 —	14 —	9 —	1	9 —	5 —	50; 14		Through the Past, Darkly (Big Hits Vol. 2)	A-side: More Hot Rocks (Big Hits & Fazed Cookies) B-side: Through the Past, Darkly (Big Hits Vol. 2)
"In Another Land" "The Lantern" Not released in the UK (Note: "In Another Land" was credited solely to Rolling Stones bassist Bill Wyman with "The Lantern" credited to the Rolling Stones.)	1967	— —	— —	— —	— —	— —	— —	— —	— —	— —	87 —		Their Satanic Majesties Request	Their Satanic Majesties Request
"She's a Rainbow" "2000 Light Years from Home" Not released in the UK (Note: In a number of territories, the sides were flipped, and "2000 Light Years from Home" was released as the A-side.)	1967	— —	9 —	9 —	— 5	— —	17 —	2 —	— —	14 —	25 —	BPI: Silver; ARIA: Gold	Their Satanic Majesties Request	Their Satanic Majesties Request
"Jumpin' Jack Flash" "Child of the Moon"	1968	1 —	2 —	5 —	1 —	3 —	16 —	1 —	3 —	8 —	3 —	BPI: Gold; ARIA: Platinum	A-side: Through the Past, Darkly (Big Hits Vol. 2) B-side: No Stone Unturned	A-side: Through the Past, Darkly (Big Hits Vol. 2) B-side: More Hot Rocks (Big Hits & Fazed Cookies)
"Street Fighting Man" "No Expectations" Not released in the UK	1968	— —	13	32 —	7 —	— —	— —	5 —	— —	9 —	48 —		Beggars Banquet	Beggars Banquet
"Sympathy for the Devil" "Prodigal Son" Not released in the UK (Note: "Sympathy for the Devil" was only initially released as a single in Belgium, Mexico and Japan in 1969, before being released in the Netherlands in 1973 and Germany in 1974.)	1969	— —	— —	— —	— —	— —	— —	13 —	— —	— —	— —	BPI: 2× Platinum; ARIA: 3× Platinum; BVMI: Gold; FIMI: Platinum	Beggars Banquet	Beggars Banquet
"Honky Tonk Women" "You Can't Always Get What You Want"	1969	1 —	1	2 —	2 —	1 —	18 —	4 —	2 —	2 —	1 —	BPI: Silver; ARIA: Platinum; RIAA: Gold	A-side: Through the Past, Darkly (Big Hits Vol. 2) B-side: Let It Bleed	A-side: Through the Past, Darkly (Big Hits Vol. 2) B-side: Let It Bleed
"—" denotes releases that did not chart or were not released in that territory.

=== 1970s ===
Title (A-side/B-side)	Year	Peak chart positions										Certifications	Album
Title (A-side/B-side)	Year	UK	AUS	CAN	GER	IRE	ITA	NLD	NOR	SWE	US	Certifications	Album
"(I Can't Get No) Satisfaction" "The Under Assistant West Coast Promotion Man" Continental Europe reissue	1970	— —	— —	— —	— —	— —	— —	16 —	— —	— —	— —		Out of Our Heads
"Little Queenie" (live) "Love in Vain" (live) Not released in the UK	1971	— —	29 —	— —	19 —	— —	23 —	12 —	— —	— —	— —		Get Yer Ya-Ya's Out!
"Brown Sugar" "Bitch" "Let It Rock" (live) (Note: In the UK, "Brown Sugar" was released with two B-sides, "Bitch" and "Let it Rock"; whereas in the US, it was released with only "Bitch" as the B-side.)	1971	2	5 — —	1 — —	4 — —	2 — —	— — —	1 — —	4 — —	— — —	1 — —	BPI: Platinum; ARIA: Platinum	Sticky Fingers
"Wild Horses" "Sway" Not released in the UK	1971	— —	96 —	11 —	— —	— —	— —	— —	— —	— —	28 —	BPI: Gold; ARIA: Platinum	Sticky Fingers
"Street Fighting Man" "Surprise Surprise" First UK single release	1971	21 —	— —	— —	— —	— —	— —	— —	— —	— —	— —		A-side: Beggars Banquet B-side: No Stone Unturned
"Let It Rock" (live) "Blow with Ry" Germany release	1972	— —	— —	— —	25 —	— —	— —	— —	— —	— —	— —		A-side: Sticky Fingers (Spanish ed.) B-side: Jamming with Edward!
"Tumbling Dice" "Sweet Black Angel"	1972	5 —	22 —	7 —	17 —	14 —	— —	5 —	6 —	11 —	7 —	ARIA: Gold	Exile on Main St.
"Happy" "All Down the Line" Not released in the UK	1972	— —	— —	9 —	— —	— —	— —	— —	— —	— —	22 —		Exile on Main St.
"You Can't Always Get What You Want" "Honky Tonk Women" US reissue with sides flipped	1973	— —	— —	— —	— —	— —	— —	— —	— —	— —	42 —		A-side: Let It Bleed B-side: Through the Past, Darkly (Big Hits Vol. 2)
"Sad Day" "You Can't Always Get What You Want"	1973	52 (Note: "Sad Day" did not reach the Top 50 Singles chart, but peaked at number 2 in the Bubblers chart.) —	— —	— —	— —	— —	— —	19 —	— —	— —	— —		A-side: No Stone Unturned B-side: Let It Bleed
"Angie" "Silver Train"	1973	5 —	1 —	1 —	2 —	9 —	1 —	1 —	1 —	— —	1 —	BPI: Silver; ARIA: 2× Platinum; FIMI: Gold; RIAA: Gold	Goats Head Soup
"Star Star" "Doo Doo Doo Doo Doo (Heartbreaker)" Continental Europe reissue	1973	— —	— —	— —	32 —	— —	— —	16 —	— —	— —	— —		Goats Head Soup
"Doo Doo Doo Doo Doo (Heartbreaker)" "Dancing with Mr. D." Not released in the UK	1973	— —	100 —	5 —	— —	— —	— —	— —	— —	— —	15 —		Goats Head Soup
"It's Only Rock 'n Roll (But I Like It)" "Through the Lonely Nights"	1974	10 —	17 —	12 —	36 —	6 —	— —	13 —	8 —	— —	16 —		A-side: It's Only Rock 'n Roll (But I Like It) B-side: Rarities 1971–2003
"Ain't Too Proud to Beg" "Dance Little Sister" Not released in the UK	1974	— —	— —	14 —	— —	— —	— —	— (Note: "Ain’t Too Proud To Beg" peaked at number 2 in the Dutch Single Tip.) —	— —	— —	17 —		It's Only Rock 'n Roll
"I Don't Know Why" "Try a Little Harder"	1975	— (Note: "I Don’t Know Why" did not reach the Top 50 Singles chart but spent one week in the Breakers chart, unumbered.) —	— —	38 —	— —	— —	— —	— —	— —	— —	42 —		Metamorphosis
"Out of Time" "Jiving Sister Fanny"	1975	45 —	88 —	94 —	— —	— —	— —	— —	— —	— —	81 —		Metamorphosis
"Fool to Cry" "Crazy Mama" (UK) "Hot Stuff" (US)	1976	6 — —	45 — —	11 — —	— — —	6 — —	— — —	10 — —	8 — —	— — —	10 — 49		Black and Blue
"Miss You" "Far Away Eyes"	1978	3 —	8 —	1 —	12 —	3 —	10 —	3 —	11 —	6 —	1 —	BPI: Silver; ARIA: Platinum; RIAA: Gold	Some Girls
"Beast of Burden" "When the Whip Comes Down" Not released in the UK	1978	— —	— —	9 —	— —	— —	— —	— —	— —	— —	8 —	BPI: Gold; ARIA: 3× Platinum	Some Girls
"Respectable" "When the Whip Comes Down"	1978	23 —	91 —	— —	— —	16 —	— —	16 —	— —	— —	— —		Some Girls
"Shattered" "Everything Is Turning to Gold" US and Canada release	1978	— —	— —	32 —	— —	— —	— —	— —	— —	— —	31 —		A-side: Some Girls B-side: Sucking in the Seventies
"—" denotes releases that did not chart or were not released in that territory.

=== 1980s ===
Title (A-side/B-side)	Year	Peak chart positions											Certifications	Album
Title (A-side/B-side)	Year	UK	AUS	CAN	GER	IRE	ITA	NLD	NOR	SWE	US	US Main	Certifications	Album
"Emotional Rescue" "Down in the Hole"	1980	9 —	8 —	1 —	15 —	6 —	— —	5 —	— —	— —	3 —	— —		Emotional Rescue
"She's So Cold" "Send It to Me"	1980	33 —	49 —	11 —	— —	24 —	— —	23 —	— —	— —	26 —	— —		Emotional Rescue
"Start Me Up" "No Use in Crying"	1981	7 —	1 —	2 —	36 —	11 —	14 —	5 —	8 —	14 —	2 —	1 —	BPI: Platinum; ARIA: 3× Platinum; FIMI: Platinum	Tattoo You
"Waiting on a Friend" "Little T&A"	1981	50 —	44 —	10 —	— —	— —	— —	17 —	— —	— —	13 —	8; 5	ARIA: Gold	Tattoo You
"Hang Fire" "Neighbours" Not released in the UK	1982	— —	99 —	— —	— —	— —	— —	— —	— —	— —	20 —	2 —		Tattoo You
"Going to a Go-Go" (live) "Beast of Burden" (live)	1982	26 —	48 —	4 —	— —	18 —	— —	3 —	5 —	18 —	25 —	5 —		A-side: Still Life B-side: Non-album track (Note: Later released on Rarities 1971–2003.)
"Time Is on My Side" (live) "Twenty Flight Rock" (live)	1982	62 —	— —	— —	— —	— —	— —	— (Note: "Time Is on my Side (Live)" peaked in the Dutch Single Tip chart for three weeks.) —	— —	— —	— —	— —		Still Life
"Undercover of the Night" "All the Way Down"	1983	11 —	27 —	11 —	20 —	10 —	19 —	4 —	8 —	15 —	9 —	2 —		Undercover
"She Was Hot" "I Think I'm Going Mad"	1984	42 —	60 —	— —	54 —	30 —	— —	18 —	— —	— —	44 —	4; 50		A-side: Undercover B-side: Non-album track (Note: Later released on The Singles 1971–2006.)
"Brown Sugar" "Bitch" Reissue	1984	58 —	— —	— —	— —	— —	— —	— —	— —	— —	— —	— —		A-side: Rewind (1971–1984) B-side: Sticky Fingers
"Too Much Blood" US 12-inch release	1984	—	—	—	—	—	—	—	—	—	—	38		Undercover
"Harlem Shuffle" "Had It with You"	1986	13 —	6 —	5 —	11 —	8 —	7 —	5 —	6 —	11 —	5 —	2 —	MC: Gold	Dirty Work
"One Hit (To the Body)" "Fight"	1986	80 —	34 —	39 —	— —	— —	— —	50 —	— —	— —	28 —	3 —		Dirty Work
"Paint It Black" "Long, Long While" Australia reissue	1988	— —	55 —	— —	— —	— —	— —	— —	— —	— —	— —	— —		Non-album single (Note: "Paint It Black" was re-released after its use as the theme song of the television series Tour of Duty.)
"Mixed Emotions" "Fancyman Blues"	1989	36 —	22 —	1 —	20 —	17 —	25 —	9 —	9 —	15 —	5 —	1 —		A-side: Steel Wheels B-side: Non-album track (Note: Later released on the limited edition album Flashpoint + Collectibles.)
"Rock and a Hard Place" "Cook Cook Blues"	1989	63 —	99 —	10 —	— —	— —	— —	23 —	— —	— —	23 —	1 —		A-side: Steel Wheels B-side: Non-album track
"—" denotes releases that did not chart or were not released in that territory.

=== 1990s ===
Title	Year	Peak chart positions											Album
Title	Year	UK	AUS	CAN	GER	IRE	ITA	NLD	NOR	SWE	US	US Main	Album
"Almost Hear You Sigh"	1990	31	—	14	58	—	—	11	—	—	50	1	Steel Wheels
"Terrifying"	1990	82	—	—	—	—	—	58	—	—	—	8	Steel Wheels
"Paint It Black" Reissue	1990	61	—	—	—	—	—	1	—	—	—	—	Non-album single
"Angie" Continental Europe reissue	1990	—	—	—	—	—	—	11	—	—	—	—	Rewind (1971–1984) (reissue)
"She's a Rainbow" Continental Europe reissue	1990	—	—	—	—	—	—	59	—	—	—	—	Non-album single
"Sad Sad Sad" Continental Europe release	1990	—	—	—	—	—	—	71	—	—	—	14	Steel Wheels
"(I Can't Get No) Satisfaction" Continental Europe reissue	1990	—	—	—	—	—	—	13	—	—	—	—	Non-album single
"Highwire"	1991	29	54	10	27	16	17	6	4	14	57	1	Flashpoint
"Ruby Tuesday" (live)	1991	59	—	—	—	—	—	34	—	—	—	—	Flashpoint
"Sexdrive" Not released in the UK	1991	—	133	—	—	—	—	24	—	31	—	40	Flashpoint
"Jumpin' Jack Flash" (live) Netherlands release	1991	—	—	—	—	—	—	67	—	—	—	—	Flashpoint
"Love Is Strong"	1994	14	47	2	40	—	—	6	3	27	91	2	Voodoo Lounge
"Out of Tears"	1994	36	43	3	—	—	—	37	—	—	60	14	Voodoo Lounge
"You Got Me Rocking"	1994	23	64	29	—	—	—	39	—	—	113	2	Voodoo Lounge
"I Go Wild"	1995	29	57	44	61	—	—	48	—	—	—	20	Voodoo Lounge
"Like a Rolling Stone" (live)	1995	12	47	15	48	—	9	10	9	7	109	16	Stripped
"Wild Horses" (live) Not released in the UK	1996	—	—	59	—	—	—	— (Note: "Wild Horses (Stripped)" peaked at number 2 in the Dutch Single Tip chart.)	—	53	—	—	Stripped
"Anybody Seen My Baby?"	1997	22	58	1	24	—	20	25	14	18	—	3	Bridges to Babylon
"Saint of Me"	1998	26	100	24	68	—	—	52	—	—	94	13	Bridges to Babylon
"Out of Control"	1998	51	—	—	—	—	—	—	—	—	—	—	Bridges to Babylon
"—" denotes releases that did not chart or were not released in that territory.

=== 2000s ===
Title	Year	Peak chart positions											Album
Title	Year	UK	AUS	CAN	GER	IRE	ITA	NLD	NOR	SWE	US	US Main	Album
"Don't Stop"	2002	36	—	—	52	—	48	45	—	58	—	21	Forty Licks
"Sympathy for the Devil" (remix)	2003	14	—	10	18	14	11	10	15	43	97	—	Forty Licks (new edition)
"Streets of Love" "Rough Justice"	2005	15	— —	10 —	15 —	27	17 —	5 —	14 —	5 —	— —	— 25	A Bigger Bang
"Rain Fall Down"	2005	33	—	—	80	—	46	31	—	51	—	—	A Bigger Bang
"Biggest Mistake"	2006	51	—	—	94	—	27	77	—	—	—	—	A Bigger Bang
"Paint It Black" (reissue)	2007	70	—	—	49	—	—	—	—	—	—	—	Non-album single
"You Can't Always Get What You Want" (Soulwax remix) US release	2008	—	—	—	—	—	—	—	—	—	—	—	21: Music from the Motion Picture
"—" denotes releases that did not chart or were not released in that territory.

=== 2010s ===
Title	Year	Peak chart positions								Album
Title	Year	UK	CAN	GER	ITA	NLD	SWE	US Main	US Rock	Album
"Plundered My Soul"	2010	200	—	—	—	3	27	—	42	Exile on Main St. (reissue)
"No Spare Parts"	2011	—	—	—	—	—	—	—	—	Some Girls (reissue)
"So Young"	2011	—	—	—	—	—	—	—	—	Some Girls (reissue)
"Doom and Gloom"	2012	61	72	64	36	17	—	35	30	GRRR!
"One More Shot"	2013	—	—	—	—	—	—	—	—	GRRR!
"Just Your Fool"	2016	—	—	—	—	—	—	—	49	Blue & Lonesome
"Hate to See You Go"	2016	—	—	—	—	—	—	—	—	Blue & Lonesome
"Ride 'Em on Down"	2016	—	—	—	—	—	—	—	20	Blue & Lonesome
"She's a Rainbow" (live)	2019	—	—	—	—	—	—	—	41	Honk
"—" denotes releases that did not chart or were not released in that territory.

=== 2020s ===
Title	Year	Peak chart positions								Album
Title	Year	UK	CAN	GER	ITA	NLD	US	US Main	US Rock	Album
"Living in a Ghost Town"	2020	61	74	1	49	71	106	—	3	Non-album single
"Scarlet" (featuring Jimmy Page)	2020	—	—	—	—	—	—	—	—	Goats Head Soup (reissue)
"Troubles a-Comin'"	2021	—	—	—	—	—	—	—	—	Tattoo You (reissue)
"Angry"	2023	34	—	21	—	34	—	29	22	Hackney Diamonds
"Sweet Sounds of Heaven" (featuring Lady Gaga and Stevie Wonder)	2023	— (Note: "Sweet Sounds of Heaven" did not enter the UK Singles Chart, but peaked at number 15 on the UK Singles Downloads Chart.)	—	84	—	42	—	—	—	Hackney Diamonds
"Mess It Up"	2023	—	—	—	—	—	—	—	—	Hackney Diamonds
"Satisfaction Skank" (with Fatboy Slim)	2025	— (Note: "Satisfaction Skank" did not enter the UK Singles Chart, but debuted at number 2 on the UK Singles Downloads Chart.)	—	—	—	—	—	—	—	Non-album single
"Rough and Twisted" (extremely limited physical-only release)	2026	— (Note: "Rough and Twisted" did not enter the UK Singles Chart, but peaked at number 46 on the UK Singles Sales Chart.)	—	—	—	—	—	—	—	Foreign Tongues
"In the Stars"	2026	— (Note: "In the Stars" did not enter the UK Singles Chart, but peaked at number 48 on the UK Singles Downloads Chart and number 2 on the UK Singles Sales Chart.)	—	61	—	— (Note: "In the Stars" did not enter the Dutch Single Top 100, but peaked at number 29 on the Dutch Single Tip chart.)	—	—	—	Foreign Tongues
"Jealous Lover"	2026	—	—	—	—	— (Note: "Jealous Lover" did not enter the Dutch Single Top 100, but peaked at number 16 on the Dutch Single Tip chart.)	—	—	—	Foreign Tongues
"—" denotes releases that did not chart or were not released in that territory.

=== Promotional singles ===
Title	Year	Peak chart positions		Album
Title	Year	CAN	US Main	Album
"Rocks Off"	1972	—	—	Exile on Main St.
"Time Waits for No One"	1975	—	—	It's Only Rock 'n Roll
"Before They Make Me Run"	1978	—	—	Some Girls
"If I Was a Dancer" (Dance Pt. 2)	1981	—	26	Sucking in the Seventies
"Sparks Will Fly"	1994	57	30	Voodoo Lounge
"Flip the Switch"	1997	26	14	Bridges to Babylon
"Gimme Shelter" (live)	1998	42	29	No Security
"Memory Motel" (featuring Dave Matthews)	1999	—	—	No Security
"Oh No, Not You Again"	2005	—	34	A Bigger Bang
"Following the River"	2010	—	—	Exile on Main St. (reissue)
"I Love You Too Much"	2011	—	—	Some Girls (reissue)
"Zydeco Sont Pas Salé"	2025	—	—	A Tribute to the King of Zydeco
"Shame, Shame, Shame"	2025	—	—	Black and Blue (reissue)
"—" denotes releases that did not chart or were not released in that territory.

== Other charted songs ==
Title	Year	Peak chart positions						Certifications	Album
Title	Year	UK	ITA	NLD	NZ Hot	SWE	US Main	Certifications	Album
"I'm Moving On"	1965	—	—	—	—	7	—		Got Live If You Want It! (EP)
"She Said Yeah"	1965	—	—	—	—	7	—		Out of Our Heads
"Con le mie lacrime" (Note: "Con le mie lacrime" is the Italian-language version of "As Tears Go By", released solely as a single in Italy.)	1966	—	12	—	—	—	—		Non-album single
"Too Tough"	1983	—	—	—	—	—	14		Undercover
"Winning Ugly"	1986	—	—	—	—	—	10		Dirty Work
"Gimme Shelter"	2010	76	—	—	—	—	—	BPI: 2× Platinum; ARIA: 3× Platinum; FIMI: Gold	Let It Bleed
"Get Close" (featuring Elton John)	2023	—	—	64	33	—	—		Hackney Diamonds
"Depending On You"	2023	—	—	—	35	—	—		Hackney Diamonds
"Mr. Charm"	2026	—	—	—	21	—	—		Foreign Tongues
"—" denotes releases that did not chart or were not released in that territory.

== Box sets ==
=== Albums, EPs and singles collections ===
Title	Album details	Peak chart positions				
Title	Album details	UK	FRA	GER	NLD	US
Original Master Recording: The Rolling Stones	Released: 1984; Format: 11×LP; Label: ABKCO/Decca/Mobile Fidelity Sound Lab	—	—	—	—	—
As the Years Go By	Released: 1989; Format: 20×7"; Label: London	—	—	—	—	—
Collection 1971–1989	Released: June 1990; Format: 15×CD; Label: Rolling Stones/CBS	—	—	—	—	—
Remastered Series	Released: 20 August 2003; Format: 16×SACD; Label: ABKCO	—	—	—	—	—
Singles 1963–1965	Released: 26 April 2004; Format: 12×CD / DD; Label: Decca/ABKCO	178	—	—	—	—
Singles 1965–1967	Released: 12 July 2004; Format: 11×CD / DD; Label: Decca/ABKCO	—	—	—	—	—
Singles 1968–1971	Released: 28 February 2005; Format: 9×CD / DD; Label: Decca/ABKCO	—	—	—	—	—
Collector's Box	Released: 2009; Format: 4×CD + slipcase; Label: Polydor/Rolling Stones	—	—	—	—	—
You Get What You Need	Released: 2010; Format: 8×CD + 360-page coffee table book; Label: Universal/Promotone/Chronicle Books	—	—	—	—	—
The Rolling Stones 1964–1969	Released: 22 November 2010; Format: 11×LP + 2×12" EPs; Label: ABKCO	—	—	—	—	—
The Rolling Stones Box Set 1971–2005/Remasters	Released: 17 May 2010; Format: 18×LP / 14×CD; Label: Polydor/Universal	—	—	—	—	—
The Singles 1971–2006	Released: 26 April 2011; Format: 45×CD / DD; Label: Promotone/Universal	—	—	57	—	—
The Rolling Stones in Mono	Released: 30 September 2016; Format: 16×LP / 15×CD / DD (+ 48-page book); Label: ABKCO	130	136	15	105	151
Studio Albums Vinyl Collection 1971–2016	Released: 15 June 2018; Format: 20×LP+DD; Label: Promotone/Universal/Polydor/Rolling Stones	—	—	25	—	—
7" Singles 1963–1966	Released: 10 June 2022; Format: 18×7"; Label: ABKCO/Decca/London	—	—	22	—	—
7" Singles 1966-–1971	Released: 2 February 2024; Format: 18×7"; Label: ABKCO/Decca/London	—	—	82	35	—
"—" denotes recordings that did not chart or were not released in that territory.

=== Special edition albums and reissue box sets ===
Title	Album details
The Voodoo Lounge Box/Tour-Souvenirs Limited Edition	Released: 11 July 1994; Voodoo Box format: Pignose Amp. replica box containing CD + picture disc interview CD + shirt + framed 3D-hologram picture + skull ring; Tour-Souvenirs format: limited edition tin containing CD + shirt + postcard + wristwatch + sticker + pin; Label: Virgin/Rolling Stones
Forty Licks: Special Limited Edition	Released: November 2002; US format: 2×CD + 12×12 booklet + vintage band poster; Europe format: 2×CD + 12×12 booklet + tongue-shaped mouse mat; Label: ABKCO/Virgin/Decca/Rolling Stones
Get Yer Ya-Ya's Out! 40th Anniversary Deluxe Edition	Released: 2 September 2009; Format: 3×LP + 3×CD + DVD + 56-page book; Label: ABKCO
Exile on Main St. (Super Deluxe/Limited Edition/1972 S.T.P. Tour Road Case Fan Pack)	Released: 13 May 2010 (Super Deluxe/Road Case), 27 August 2010 (Limited Edition), 19 February 2013 (Road Case reissue); Super Deluxe format: 2×LP + 2×CD + DVD + 64-page book + 4 postcards; Limited Edition format: wooden box containing 2×LP + 2×CD + DVD + 3 signed lithos + book + shirt + jewelry item; 1972 Tour Road Case Fan Pack format: S.T.P. box containing 2×CD + tour book by Bob Gruen + shirt + poster + 2 backstage passes + 8 ticket stubs + 3 badges with lanyards + '72 hotel room keychain; Label: Rolling Stones/UMe/Polydor/Bravado Merchandising
Some Girls (Deluxe/Super Deluxe/Wig Box)	Released: 21 November 2011 / 20 December 2011 (Wig Box); Deluxe formats: 24-disc CD holder in cardboard box containing 2×CD + keychain + guitar pic set + button pack / 2×CD + shirt; Super Deluxe format: 2×CD + DVD + 7" + 100-page book + art print + 5 postcards + poster; Wig Box format: album art themed wig box containing 2×CD + lipstick USB w/ deluxe album, rare videos and photos + shirt + hair pick + compact mirror; Label: Rolling Stones/A&M/Universal Republic/Bravado Merchandising
Live at the Checkerboard Lounge, Chicago 1981 (Limited/Deluxe Edition)	Released: 4 July 2012 (Japan) / 7, 11 September 2012 (EU/US); Limited format: 3×LP + 2×CD + DVD (Japan) / 2×LP + CD + DVD (EU); Deluxe black and white color vinyl format: 2×LP + DVD (US); Label: Eagle Vision/Eagle Rock/Ward Records
GRRR! (Deluxe/Super Deluxe/LP Boxset Edition)	Released: 12 November 2012; Deluxe format: 3×CD (50-track) + 36-page hardcover book + 5 tour poster postcard set; Super Deluxe format: 4×CD (80-track) + bonus CD + 7" vinyl + 96-page hardcover book + poster + 5 tour poster postcard set; LP Boxset: 5×LP (50-track) + 36-page hardcover book; Label: ABKCO/Interscope/Polydor/Universal Music
Charlie Is My Darling: Ireland 1965 (Super Deluxe Edition)	Released: 13 November 2012; Format: 2×CD + 10" + DVD + Blu-ray + numbered limited edition enlarged film cell in 200+ unique variations; Label: ABKCO Films
The Brussels Affair (Collector's Edition)	Released: November 2012 (3 editions) / October 2013 (signed single editions) / 2016 (unsigned reissues); Format: Collector's Edition limited to 1,973 copies, 73 Art Edition boxes, 173 Platinum and 1,727 Collector's box sets with different configurations of signatures and art prints, presentation box in velvet bag containing a book w/ slipcase numbered and hand-signed by Jagger + 3×LP gatefold album w/ booklet + 2×CD + 7" signed by Taylor (100 editions) + Seiko watch + 1973 Tour lithograph; Label: Rolling Stones Archive/Rolling Stones/Promotone BV
Sticky Fingers (Deluxe/Super Deluxe)	Released: 9 June 2015; Deluxe format: 2×CD + DVD + 7" + 72-page book + 5 postcards; Super Deluxe format: 3×CD + DVD + 7" + 120-page book + 5 postcards + poster + print + cut out; Label: Rolling Stones/Polydor
Blue & Lonesome (Deluxe)	Released: 2 December 2016; Format: CD + 71-page book + 5 photos in envelope; Label: Rolling Stones/Polydor
Their Satanic Majesties Request: 50th Anniversary Edition	Released: 22 September 2017; Format: 2×LP + 2×SACD (Stereo/Mono) + 3-D lenticular cover; Label: ABKCO/London/Decca
Beggars Banquet: 50th Anniversary Edition	Released: 16 November 2018; Format: LP + 12" + 7" flexi disc + alternate cover slipcase; Label: ABKCO/London/Decca
The Rolling Stones Rock and Roll Circus: Limited Deluxe Edition	Released: 7 June 2019; Format: Blu-ray 4K restoration + DVD + 2×CD expanded version + 44-page booklet; Label: ABKCO
Let It Bleed: 50th Anniversary Limited Deluxe Edition	Released: 1 November 2019; Format: 2×LP (Stereo/Mono) + 2×SACD + 7" + 80-page book + 3 lithographs + poster; Label: ABKCO
Goats Head Soup (Super Deluxe)	Released: 4 September 2020; Format: 4×LP / 3×CD + Blu-ray + 120-page book + 4 posters; Label: Rolling Stones/Polydor
Tattoo You (Super Deluxe)	Released: 22 October 2021; Format: 5×LP / LP + 4×CD + 124-page book + lenticular sleeve; Label: Rolling Stones/Polydor
Black and Blue (Super Deluxe)	Released: 14 November 2025; Format: 5×LP / LP + 4×CD + 100-page book + 1 poster; Label: Rolling Stones/Polydor

== Videography ==
=== Video albums ===
Title	Album details	Peak chart positions					Certifications
Title	Album details	UK	GER	NLD	SWE	US	Certifications
T.A.M.I. Show	Released: 29 December 1964 (Broadcast) / 1984, 1991 (VHS) / 23 March 2010 (DVD) / 2 December 2016 (BD/DD); Label: Shout! Factory	—	—	—	—	—	
Charlie Is My Darling: Ireland 1965	Released: October 1966 (Film) / 1988 (VHS) / 29 September 2012 (NYFF) / 26 October 2012 (Film) / 6 November 2012 (DVD/BD/DD); Label: ABKCO Films/Video Beat/Video Warehouse/Brainstorm Media	11	54	12	6	2	
One Plus One/Sympathy for the Devil	Released: 30 November 1968 (Film) / 1994 (LD/VHS) / 2003 (DVD) / 2 November 2018 (DVD/BD/DD); Label: ABKCO Films/ABKCO	28	—	—	2	3	
The Stones in the Park/Hyde Park Live, 1969	Released: 1969 (Broadcast) / 1983 (LD/VHS) / 2000-2008 (DVD) / 24 July 2015 (DVD/BD/DD); Label: Granada Ventures/Vestron/Eagle Rock	8	68	—	—	1	BPI: Gold
Gimme Shelter	Released: 6 December 1970 (Film) / July 1992 (LD/VHS) / 2000 (DVD) / 1 December 2009 (DVD/BD/DD); Label: Rolling Stones	2	—	—	—	7	BPI: Gold; RIAA: Gold
The Marquee Club Live in 1971	Released: 18 September 1971 (Broadcast) / 23 June 2015 (3xCD+BD/CD+DVD/CD+BD/DVD/BD/DD); Label: Universal/Eagle Vision	2	—	3	2	1	
Ladies and Gentlemen: The Rolling Stones	Released: 1 December 1973 (UK Film) / 1974 (US Film) / 5 October 2010 (DVD/BD/DD); Label: Rolling Stones/Eagle Rock/Eagle Vision	1	20	6	1	1	BVMI: Gold; MC: 2× Platinum; RIAA: Platinum
Cocksucker Blues	Released: 1979 (Limited) / 2009 (The Met) / 2010 (DVD); Label: Rolling Stones/UMe/Polydor	—	—	—	—	—	
Hampton Coliseum (Live 1981)	Released: 18 December 1981 (pay-per-view) / 3 November 2014 (DVD/BD/DD); Label: Universal/Eagle Rock/Eagle Vision/Rolling Stones	1	19	2	1	1	MC: Gold
Let's Spend the Night Together	Released: 15 October 1982 (EU Film) / 1983 (Film/LD/VHS) / 2006 (DVD) / 2 November 2010 (DVD/DD); Label: Universal/Embassy Home Entertainment/StudioCanal/Lionsgate	—	—	—	—	5	
Video Rewind – Great Video Hits	Released: 21 December 1984 (LD/VHS) / 1986 (VHS); Label: Vestron	—	—	—	—	6	
Atlantic City '89/Steel Wheels Live Atlantic City New Jersey	Released: 19 December 1989 (Broadcast) / 25 September 2020 (3xCD+2xDVD+BD/2xCD+DVD/2xCD+BD/DVD/BD/DD); Label: Universal/Eagle Rock/Rolling Stones	1	—	18	8	—	
25×5: The Continuing Adventures of the Rolling Stones	Released: 27 December 1989 (Broadcast) / 13 February 1990 (LD/VHS) / 1996 (LD); Label: CMV Enterprises	—	—	—	—	1	BVMI: Gold; MC: Platinum; RIAA: Platinum
Stones at the Max/Live at the Max	Released: 25 October 1991 (IMAX) / Feb 1992 (Film) / 1994 (LD/VHS/VCD) / 1999 (DVD) / 2009 (BD/DD); Label: Castle Music Pictures/Universal/PolyGram Video/Image Entertainment/Rolling Stones	25	—	1	—	7	RIAA: Gold
Voodoo Lounge Souvenir Video	Released: 1 October 1994 (VHS); Label: Rolling Stones	—	—	—	—	—	
Voodoo Lounge Live at the Tokyo Dome 1995	Released: 27 September 1995 (LD) / 15 March 2019 (DVD/BD/DD); Label: Dolphin/Universal/Rolling Stones	—	—	—	—	—	
Stripped	Released: November 1995 (Broadcast) / 3 June 2016 (DVD/BD/DD); Label: Universal/Eagle Rock/Eagle Vision/Rolling Stones	—	—	—	—	1	
Voodoo Lounge Live	Released: November 1995 (VHS) / 1996 (LD/VHS/DVD) / 1998 (DVD); Label: Castle Music Pictures/PolyGram/Image Ent/Eagle Rock	15	—	—	7	14	
The Rolling Stones Rock and Roll Circus	Released: 12 October 1996 (Film) / November 1996 (LD/VHS) / October 2004 (DVD) / 2019 (DVD/BD/DD); Label: ABKCO Films/Universal/PolyGram	5	—	—	7	1	BPI: Gold; RIAA: Platinum
Bridges to Babylon Tour '97–98	Released: 17 November 1998 (LD/VHS/DVD) / 1999 (DVD); Label: Warner Home Video/Eagle Rock	5	—	2	—	7	BPI: Gold
Four Flicks	Released: 11 November 2003 (4×DVD); Label: Warner Music Vision/TGA	11	38	2	3	1	BPI: Gold; MC: 2× Diamond; RIAA: 19× Platinum; SNEP: 2× Platinum
Toronto Rocks	Released: 14 July 2004 (DVD/2×DVD); Label: Rhino Home Video/Warner Music Vision	—	—	—	—	1	
A Bigger Bang – Special Edition	Released: 6 September, 22 November 2005 (CD+DVD); Label: EMI/Virgin/Rolling Stones	—	—	—	—	3	
Truth & Lies	Released: 2006 (DVD); Label: Eagle Rock	—	—	—	—	—	
The Biggest Bang	Released: 30 July 2007 (4×DVD) / 2009 (BD); Label: Universal/Redline/Rolling Stones	2	1	1	1	1	BPI: Gold; BVMI: Gold; RIAA: 7× Platinum
Shine a Light	Released: 4 April 2008 (Film/IMAX) / 29 April 2008 (BD) / 29 July 2008 (DVD/DD) / 2017 (DVD/BD); Label: Paramount Pictures/Twentieth Century Fox	1	—	—	1	11	BPI: Platinum
Get Yer Ya-Ya's Out! The Rolling Stones in Concert – 40th Anniversary Bonus DVD	Released: November 2009 (DVD); Label: ABKCO Films/ABKCO	—	—	—	—	—	
Stones in Exile	Released: 19 May 2010 (Film) / June 2010 (DVD/BD) / 2017 (DD); Label: Passion Pictures/Eagle Rock/Eagle Vision	3	27	4	2	2	MC: Platinum; RIAA: Gold
3/4/All 6 Ed Sullivan Shows	Released: October 2011 (DVD/2xDVD); Label: SOFA Entertainment	—	—	—	—	3	
Some Girls: Live in Texas '78	Released: 21 November 2011 (DVD/BD/DD); Label: Eagle Rock/Eagle Vision/Rolling Stones	12	34	8	2	4	MC: Platinum; RIAA: Gold
Muddy Waters & The Rolling Stones Live at the Checkerboard Lounge, Chicago 1981	Released: 10 July 2012 (DVD/DD); Label: Eagle Rock/Eagle Vision	6	36	2	2	3	RIAA: Gold
Crossfire Hurricane	Released: 18 October 2012 (Film) / 7 Jan, 21 May 2013 (DVD/BD/DD); Label: Eagle Rock/Eagle Vision	1	50	—	3	1	MC: Platinum
One More Shot	Released: 15 December 2012 (Broadcast); Label: AEG Ehrlich Ventures/WWE	—	—	—	—	—	
Glastonbury 2013/Live Glastonbury!	Released: 29 June 2013 (Broadcast) / 2016 (DVD) / 10 September 2018 (BD); Label: Rolling Stones/Music Brokers Brasil	43	—	—	6	—	
Sweet Summer Sun: Live in Hyde Park	Released: 11 November 2013 (2×CD+2×DVD+BD/2×CD+DVD+BD/2×CD+DVD/DVD/BD/DD); Label: Eagle Rock/Eagle Vision/Rolling Stones	1	—	1	1	1	BPI: Platinum; MC: Platinum; RIAA: Gold
L.A. Forum (Live in 1975)	Released: 17 November 2014 (2×CD+DVD/3×LP+DVD/DVD/DD); Label: Universal/Eagle Rock/Eagle Vision/Rolling Stones	3	19	2	1	1	MC: Gold
Live at the Tokyo Dome 1990	Released: 4 November 2015 (2×CD+DVD/2×CD+BD/2×CD+DVD+BD/4×LP+DVD/DVD/BD/DD) / 2017 (2×CD+DVD/3×DVD); Label: Universal/Eagle Rock/Eagle Vision/Rolling Stones	2	21	4	4	5	
Live at Leeds Roundhay Park 1982	Released: 9 November 2015 (DVD/BD/DD); Label: Universal/Eagle Rock/Eagle Vision/Rolling Stones	7	—	8	5	6	
Totally Stripped	Released: 3 June 2016 (CD+4xDVD/CD+4×BD/CD+BD/CD+DVD/DVD/BD/DD) / 2017 (DVD/BD); Label: Universal/Eagle Rock/Eagle Vision/Rolling Stones	1	—	3	1	1	
Havana Moon	Released: 11 November 2016 (2×CD+DVD+BD/2×CD+DVD/DVD/BD/DD); Label: Universal/Eagle Rock/Eagle Vision/Rolling Stones	3	—	1	1	1	BVMI: 2× Platinum; MC: Gold; SNEP: 2× Platinum
Olé Olé Olé!: A Trip Across Latin America	Released: 13 December 2016 (Film) / 26 May 2017 (DVD/BD/DD); Label: Universal/Eagle Rock/Eagle Vision/Rolling Stones	4	—	1	1	2	
Sticky Fingers: Live at the Fonda Theater 2015	Released: 29 September 2017 (CD+DVD/CD+BD/DVD/BD/DD); Label: Universal/Eagle Rock/Eagle Vision/Rolling Stones	2	—	3	2	3	SNEP: Gold
No Security. San Jose '99	Released: 13 July 2018 (DVD/BD/DD); Label: Universal/Eagle Rock/Eagle Vision/Rolling Stones	1	—	1	1	2	
Voodoo Lounge Uncut	Released: 16 November 2018 (DVD+BD/DVD/BD/DD); Label: Universal/Eagle Rock/Eagle Vision/Rolling Stones	3	—	2	1	1	SNEP: Gold
Bridges to Bremen (Live)	Released: 21 June 2019 (DVD/BD/DD); Label: Universal/Eagle Rock/Eagle Vision/Rolling Stones	2	—	—	1	1	
Bridges to Buenos Aires (Live)	Released: 8 November 2019 (DVD/BD/DD); Label: Universal/Eagle Rock/Eagle Vision/Rolling Stones	2	—	—	1	1	
Brussels Affair (Live 1973)	Released: 8 September 2020 (Streaming clips); Label: Eagle/UMG/Polydor	—	—	—	—	—	
A Bigger Bang – Live on Copacabana Beach	Released: 9 July 2021 (2×DVD/2×BD/DVD/BD/DD); Label: Mercury Studios	1	—	—	—	—	
Licked Live in NYC	Released: 10 June 2022 (2×DVD/2×BD/DVD/BD/DD); Label: Mercury Studios	1	—	—	—	—	
GRRR Live! – Live at Newark	Released: 10 February 2023 (DVD/BD/DD); Label: Mercury Studios	—	—	—	—	—	
Welcome to Shepherd's Bush	Released: 6 December 2024 (BD/UHD-BD); Label: Mercury Studios	—	—	—	—	—	
"—" denotes recordings that did not chart or were not released in that territory.

=== Video box sets ===
Title	Album details	Peak chart positions			
Title	Album details	UK	NLD	SWE	US
Ladies and Gentlemen: The Rolling Stones (Deluxe Numbered Limited Edition with Stones in Exile)	Released: 5 October 2010 (3×DVD); Label: Rolling Stones/Eagle Rock/Eagle Vision	—	—	—	—
Ladies and Gentlemen: The Rolling Stones and Some Girls: Live in Texas '78	Released: 15 October 2012 (2×BD); Label: Eagle Rock/Eagle Vision	36	—	—	—
Ladies and Gentlemen: The Rolling Stones and Stones in Exile	Released: 3 November 2012 (2×DVD/BD); Label: Eagle Rock/Eagle Vision/Rolling Stones/Passion Pictures	41	—	—	32
Ladies and Gentlemen: The Rolling Stones, Stones in Exile and Some Girls: Live in Texas '78	Released: 9 November 2012 (3×DVD); Label: Eagle Rock/Eagle Vision	—	10	8	—
Rolling Stones from the Vault – The Complete Series 1	Released: 20 November 2015 (5×DVD); Label: Rolling Stones/Eagle Vision/Universal	—	24	9	—
The Rolling Stones Collection	Released: 21 May 2018 (2×DVD); Label: IMC Video	2	—	—	—
"—" denotes recordings that did not chart or were not released in that territory.

=== Music videos ===
Year	Title	Director
1966	"Have You Seen Your Mother, Baby, Standing in the Shadow?"	Peter Whitehead
1967	"We Love You"	Peter Whitehead
1967	"Dandelion"	Peter Whitehead
1967	"2000 Light Years from Home"	Michael Lindsay-Hogg
1968	"Jumpin' Jack Flash"	Michael Lindsay-Hogg
1968	"Child of the Moon"	Michael Lindsay-Hogg
1968	"Street Fighting Man"	Michael Lindsay-Hogg
1973	"Angie" (Version 1 & 2)	Michael Lindsay-Hogg
1973	"Silver Train"	Michael Lindsay-Hogg
1973	"Dancing with Mr. D."	Michael Lindsay-Hogg
1974	"It's Only Rock 'n Roll (But I Like It)"	Michael Lindsay-Hogg
1974	"Ain't Too Proud to Beg"	Michael Lindsay-Hogg
1974	"Till the Next Goodbye"	Michael Lindsay-Hogg
1976	"Fool to Cry"	Bruce Gowers
1976	"Hot Stuff"	Michael Lindsay-Hogg and Bruce Gowers
1976	"Hey Negrita"	Bruce Gowers
1976	"Crazy Mama"	Michael Lindsay-Hogg
1978	"Miss You"	Michael Lindsay-Hogg
1978	"Far Away Eyes"	Michael Lindsay-Hogg
1978	"Respectable"	Michael Lindsay-Hogg
1980	"Emotional Rescue" (Thermo Version)	Adam Friedman
1980	"Where the Boys Go"	Adam Friedman
1980	"Emotional Rescue" (Performance Version)	David Mallet
1980	"She's So Cold"	David Mallet
1981	"Start Me Up"	Michael Lindsay-Hogg
1981	"Worried About You"	Michael Lindsay-Hogg
1981	"Neighbours"	Michael Lindsay-Hogg
1981	"Waiting on a Friend"	Michael Lindsay-Hogg
1982	"Hang Fire"	Michael Lindsay-Hogg
1982	"Going to a Go-Go"	Hal Ashby (Live Version)
1982	"Going to a Go-Go"	Russell Mulcahy (Alternate Version)
1982	"Time Is on My Side" (live)	Rudi Dolezal and Hannes Rossacher
1982	"Paint It Black"	Robert C. Hughes
1983	"Undercover of the Night"	Julien Temple
1984	"She Was Hot"	Julien Temple
1984	"Too Much Blood"	Julien Temple
1986	"Harlem Shuffle"	Ralph Bakshi and John Kricfalusi
1986	"One Hit (To the Body)"	Russell Mulcahy
1989	"Mixed Emotions"	Jim Gable and Jim Signorelli
1989	"Sad Sad Sad"	Julien Temple
1989	"Rock and a Hard Place"	Wayne Isham
1990	"Almost Hear You Sigh"	Wayne Isham
1990	"Terrifying"	Jim Gable
1991	"Highwire"	Julien Temple
1991	"Ruby Tuesday" (live)	Julien Temple
1991	"Sex Drive"	Julien Temple
1994	"Love Is Strong"	David Fincher
1994	"You Got Me Rocking"	Jim Gable
1994	"Out of Tears"	Jake Scott
1995	"I Go Wild"	Kevin Kerslake
1995	"Like a Rolling Stone"	Michel Gondry
1996	"Wild Horses" (acoustic)	Jim Gable
1997	"Anybody Seen My Baby?"	Samuel Bayer
1998	"Saint of Me"	Samuel Bayer
1998	"Flip the Switch" (live)	Jim Gable
1998	"Out of Control" (live)	Dick Carruthers and Bruce Gowers
1998	"Gimme Shelter" (live)	Michel Gondry (Official version)
1998	"Gimme Shelter" (live)	Dick Carruthers and Bruce Gowers (Live Version)
1999	"Memory Motel" (live)	Dick Carruthers and Bruce Gowers
2002	"Don't Stop"	Kalle Haglund
2003	"Sympathy for the Devil"	Mick Gochanour (Fatboy Slim Remix)
2003	"Sympathy for the Devil"	Alex De Rakoff (The Neptunes Remix)
2005	"Rough Justice"	Laurel Harris
2005	"Streets of Love"	Laurel Harris (Studio version)
2005	"Streets of Love"	Jake Nava (Official version)
2005	"Rain Fall Down" (Explicit/Censored Versions, will.i.am Remix)	Jonas Åkerlund
2009	"Wild Horses" (live at Knebworth 1976)	Michael Lindsay-Hogg
2010	"Plundered My Soul"	Robert Frank
2010	"Following the River"	Julian Gibbs
2011	"No Spare Parts"	Mat Whitecross
2012	"Doom and Gloom"	Jonas Åkerlund
2015	"Can't You Hear Me Knocking" (Alternate Version)	Unknown
2015	"Bitch" (Extended Version)	Unknown
2016	"Hate to See You Go"	Unknown
2016	"Ride 'Em On Down"	François Rousselet
2020	"Living in a Ghost Town"	Joe Connor
2020	"Criss Cross"	Diana Kunst
2020	"Scarlet"	Christopher Barrett and Luke Taylor
2023	"Angry"	François Rousselet
2023	"Mess It Up"	Calmatic
2026	"In the Stars"	François Rousselet
2026	"Jealous Lover"	Chris Barrett and Luke Taylor
2026	"Mr. Charm"	Henry Scholfield

== See also ==
- Live'r Than You'll Ever Be
- Keith Richards discography
- Mick Jagger discography
