= Live at the Tokyo Dome =

Live album by the Rolling Stones
- Released: 11 July 2012
- Recorded: 26 February 1990
- Venue: Tokyo Dome
- Genre: Rock
- Length: 132:22
- Label: Promotone BV

The Rolling Stones chronology
Live at the Checkerboard Lounge, Chicago 1981 (2012)	Live at the Tokyo Dome (2012)	Light the Fuse (2012)

Live at the Tokyo Dome is a live album by the Rolling Stones, released in 2012. It was recorded at the Tokyo Dome in Japan in 1990. The album was released exclusively as a digital download through Google Music on 10 July 2012, and subsequently on the Stones Archive Store on 11 July 2012.

The 2-CD/DVD, single DVD and SD Blu-ray for this concert was released on 4 November 2015 titled From the Vault – Live at the Tokyo Dome.

== Track listing ==
All tracks are written by Mick Jagger and Keith Richards, except where noted.

Live at the Tokyo Dome track listing
No.	Title	Writer(s)	Length
1.	"Start Me Up"		4:05
2.	"Bitch"		3:47
3.	"Sad Sad Sad"		3:45
4.	"Harlem Shuffle"	Bob Relf; Earl Nelson	4:17
5.	"Tumbling Dice"		3:57
6.	"Miss You"		6:43
7.	"Ruby Tuesday"		3:20
8.	"Almost Hear You Sigh"		5:17
9.	"Rock and a Hard Place"		5:16
10.	"Mixed Emotions"		5:20
11.	"Honky Tonk Women"		5:00
12.	"Midnight Rambler"		10:18
13.	"You Can't Always Get What You Want"		7:31
14.	"Can't Be Seen"		5:11
15.	"Happy"		4:13
16.	"Paint It Black"		4:07
17.	"2000 Light Years from Home"		6:49
18.	"Sympathy for the Devil"		7:58
19.	"Gimme Shelter"		6:28
20.	"Band Introductions"		1:39
21.	"It's Only Rock 'n Roll (But I Like It)"		4:25
22.	"Brown Sugar"		4:34
23.	"(I Can't Get No) Satisfaction"		8:56
24.	"Jumpin' Jack Flash"		7:37
Total length:			132:22

== Personnel ==
The Rolling Stones:

- Mick Jagger – vocals, guitar, harmonica, maracas
- Keith Richards – guitar, vocals & lead vocals tracks 14–15
- Ronnie Wood – guitar
- Bill Wyman – bass
- Charlie Watts – drums

Additional personnel:

- Lisa Fischer – backing vocals
- Cindy Mizelle – backing vocals
- Bernard Fowler – backing vocals, percussion
- Chuck Leavell – keyboards, backing vocals
- Matt Clifford – keyboards, backing vocals, percussion, French horn
- Bobby Keys – saxophone
