= Live at Leeds (Rolling Stones album) =

Live album by the Rolling Stones
- Released: 12 November 2012; 9 November 2015 (DVD)
- Recorded: 25 July 1982
- Venue: Roundhay Park; Leeds, West Yorkshire, England
- Genre: Rock
- Length: 123:51
- Label: Promotone BV

The Rolling Stones chronology
Light the Fuse (2012)	Live at Leeds (2012)	GRRR! (2012)

Live at Leeds is a live album by the Rolling Stones, released in 2012. It was recorded at Roundhay Park, Leeds on 25 July 1982. The album was released exclusively as a digital download through Google Music on 12 November 2012. The concert was the band's final show of their European Tour 1982 and was also the band's last live performance with band co-founder and pianist Ian Stewart.

The song list on this collection is nearly identical to that of Hampton Coliseum (Live 1981), another Rolling Stones live album released earlier in 2012 which documents a show from the 1981 U.S. leg of the same tour. This recording includes the song "Angie", which does not appear on the Hampton Coliseum recording, but misses two songs which appear on the Hampton album: "Waiting on a Friend" and "Let It Bleed".

The 2-CD/DVD, single DVD and SD Blu-ray for this concert was released on 9 November 2015 entitled, From the Vault – Live in Leeds 1982.

== Track listing ==
All tracks are written by Mick Jagger and Keith Richards, except where noted.

Live at Leeds track listing
No.	Title	Writer(s)	Length
1.	"Intro: Take the "A" Train"	Duke Ellington	1:36
2.	"Under My Thumb"		3:50
3.	"When the Whip Comes Down"		4:07
4.	"Let's Spend the Night Together"		4:09
5.	"Shattered"		4:48
6.	"Neighbours"		4:31
7.	"Black Limousine"	Mick Jagger; Keith Richards; Ronnie Wood	3:54
8.	"Just My Imagination"	Norman Whitfield; Barrett Strong	9:09
9.	"Twenty Flight Rock"	Eddie Cochran; Ned Fairchild	1:46
10.	"Going to a Go-Go"	Smokey Robinson; Pete Moore; Bobby Rogers; Marv Tarplin	3:44
11.	"Let Me Go"		4:28
12.	"Time Is on My Side"	Norman Meade; Jimmy Norman	3:49
13.	"Beast of Burden"		8:38
14.	"You Can't Always Get What You Want"		11:04
15.	"Little T&A"		4:38
16.	"Angie"		4:55
17.	"Tumbling Dice"		4:28
18.	"She's So Cold"		4:05
19.	"Hang Fire"		3:03
20.	"Miss You"		8:31
21.	"Honky Tonk Women"		3:27
22.	"Brown Sugar"		3:45
23.	"Start Me Up"		5:14
24.	"Jumpin' Jack Flash"		8:04
25.	"(I Can't Get No) Satisfaction"		10:27
Total length:			123:51

== Personnel ==
The Rolling Stones

- Mick Jagger – vocals, guitar
- Keith Richards – guitar, backing vocals, lead vocal "Little T&A"
- Ronnie Wood – guitar, backing vocals
- Bill Wyman – bass
- Charlie Watts – drums

Additional personnel

- Ian Stewart – piano
- Chuck Leavell – keyboards, backing vocals
- Gene Barge – saxophone
- Bobby Keys – saxophone
