= Light the Fuse =

Live album by the Rolling Stones
- Released: 16 October 2012
- Recorded: 10 August 2005
- Venue: Phoenix Concert Theatre, Toronto
- Genre: Rock
- Length: 71:19
- Label: Promotone BV

The Rolling Stones Live chronology
Live at the Tokyo Dome (2012)	Light the Fuse (2012)	Live at Leeds (2012)

Light the Fuse is a live album by the Rolling Stones, released in 2012. It was recorded on 10 August 2005 at the Phoenix Concert Theatre in Toronto, Ontario, Canada. The album was released exclusively as a digital download through Google Music on 16 October 2012. The concert was performed in front of an audience of only 1,000.

== Track listing ==
All tracks are written by Mick Jagger and Keith Richards, except where noted.

Light the Fuse track listing
No.	Title	Writer(s)	Length
1.	"Rough Justice"		4:15
2.	"Live with Me"		4:11
3.	"19th Nervous Breakdown"		4:43
4.	"She's So Cold"		4:43
5.	"Dead Flowers"		4:17
6.	"Back of My Hand"		5:09
7.	"Ain't Too Proud to Beg"	Norman Whitfield; Eddie Holland	4:21
8.	"Band Intros"		3:28
9.	"Infamy"		5:50
10.	"Oh No, Not You Again"		4:37
11.	"Get Up, Stand Up"	Bob Marley; Peter Tosh	6:21
12.	"Mr. Pitiful"	Steve Cropper; Otis Redding	3:29
13.	"Tumbling Dice"		4:41
14.	"Brown Sugar"		4:48
15.	"Jumpin' Jack Flash"		5:04
Total length:			71:19

== Personnel ==
The Rolling Stones

- Mick Jagger – vocals, guitar
- Keith Richards – guitar, vocals & lead vocal on track 9
- Charlie Watts – drums
- Ronnie Wood – guitar

Additional personnel

- Bernard Fowler – backing vocals
- Chuck Leavell – keyboards
- Blondie Chaplin – backing vocals, acoustic guitar
- Lisa Fischer – backing vocals
- Kent Smith – trumpet
- Tim Ries – saxophone
- Michael Davis – trombone
- Bobby Keys – saxophone
- Darryl Jones – bass
