= Hampton Coliseum (Live 1981) =

Live album by the Rolling Stones
- Released: 30 January 2012; 3 November 2014 (DVD)
- Recorded: 18 December 1981
- Venue: Hampton Coliseum, Hampton, Virginia
- Genre: Rock
- Length: 136:26
- Label: Promotone BV

The Rolling Stones chronology
| Some Girls: Live in Texas '78 (2011) | Hampton Coliseum (Live 1981) (2012) | L.A. Friday (Live 1975) (2012) |

Hampton Coliseum (Live 1981) is a live album by the Rolling Stones, released in 2012 under the band's label, Promotone BV. It was recorded at the Hampton Coliseum in Hampton, Virginia on 18 December 1981, for what was the penultimate show of the band's U.S. tour that year. The show was the first-ever live pay-per-view broadcast of a music concert. The album was released exclusively as a digital download through Google Music on 30 January 2012.

The song list on this collection is nearly identical to that of Live at Leeds, another Rolling Stones live album released later in 2012 which documents the final show on the 1982 European leg of the same tour. This recording includes the songs "Waiting on a Friend" and "Let It Bleed"; the Leeds recording does not but does include "Angie", which does not appear here.

Two items of note from this performance: 1) While introducing the band, Mick Jagger leads the audience in an impromptu version of "Happy Birthday", in honor of Keith Richards turning 38 on this day. 2) Just over a minute into the final song "(I Can't Get No) Satisfaction", Richards had a memorable confrontation with a fan who jumped on stage. Without losing his composure, Richards moved in front of the charging fan, wielding his guitar like a baseball bat, then shoved the fan away from Jagger with his guitar until security guards could escort the intruder away. On this recording, Jagger can be heard singing through the whole episode, while Richards' guitar falls out for a few moments and some feedback can be heard. Richards then resumes playing, his instrument audibly unaffected by the rough contact it absorbed.

The 2-CD/DVD, single DVD and Blu-Ray for this concert was released on 3 November 2014 entitled, From The Vault – Hampton Coliseum – Live in 1981.

The album peaked at number 120 on the Billboard 200 chart.

Initially the Hampton Coliseum was not a scheduled stop on the Rolling Stones tour. Thanks to a grassroots campaign by local radio stations and petitions signed by thousands of area residents, the band added two Hampton shows to the itinerary.

== Track listing ==
All tracks are written by Mick Jagger and Keith Richards, except where noted.

| No. | Title | Writer(s) | Length |
|---|---|---|---|
| 1. | "Under My Thumb" | | 5:04 |
| 2. | "When the Whip Comes Down" | | 5:06 |
| 3. | "Let's Spend the Night Together" | | 4:32 |
| 4. | "Shattered" | | 4:50 |
| 5. | "Neighbours" | | 4:23 |
| 6. | "Black Limousine" | Mick Jagger; Keith Richards; Ronnie Wood | 3:28 |
| 7. | "Just My Imagination (Running Away with Me)" | Norman Whitfield; Barrett Strong | 9:46 |
| 8. | "Twenty Flight Rock" | Eddie Cochran; Ned Fairchild | 1:47 |
| 9. | "Going to a Go-Go" | Smokey Robinson; Pete Moore; Bobby Rogers; Marv Tarplin | 4:03 |
| 10. | "Let Me Go" | | 5:25 |
| 11. | "Time Is on My Side" | Norman Meade; Jimmy Norman | 4:13 |
| 12. | "Beast of Burden" | | 7:24 |
| 13. | "Waiting on a Friend" | | 5:55 |
| 14. | "Let It Bleed" | | 6:58 |
| 15. | "You Can't Always Get What You Want" | | 9:35 |
| 16. | "Band Introductions" | | 1:42 |
| 17. | "Little T&A" | | 3:58 |
| 18. | "Tumbling Dice" | | 4:48 |
| 19. | "She's So Cold" | | 4:25 |
| 20. | "Hang Fire" | | 2:40 |
| 21. | "Miss You" | | 7:46 |
| 22. | "Honky Tonk Women" | | 3:42 |
| 23. | "Brown Sugar" | | 3:39 |
| 24. | "Start Me Up" | | 5:06 |
| 25. | "Jumpin' Jack Flash" | | 8:43 |
| 26. | "(I Can't Get No) Satisfaction" | | 7:28 |
| Total length: | | | 2:16:26 |

== Personnel ==
- Mick Jagger – vocals, guitar
- Keith Richards – guitars, vocals & lead vocal track 17
- Ronnie Wood – guitars, backing vocals
- Bill Wyman – bass guitar
- Charlie Watts – drums

Additional personnel

- Ian Stewart – piano
- Ian McLagan – keyboards, backing vocals
- Ernie Watts – saxophone
- Bobby Keys – tenor saxophone on "Let it Bleed", "Brown Sugar", "Tumbling Dice" and "Honky Tonk Woman"
