= The Rolling Stones: Voodoo Lounge Live =

1995 Rolling Stones concert film

Voodoo Lounge Live
- VHS videotape cover
- Directed by: David Mallet
- Starring: The Rolling Stones
- Cinematography: Toby Phillips
- Edited by: Tim Waddell
- Distributed by: PolyGram Video
- Release date: 1995

Voodoo Lounge Live is a concert video by the rock band the Rolling Stones. It was filmed on 25 November 1994 at Joe Robbie Stadium in Miami Gardens, Florida during the Voodoo Lounge Tour. The concert was broadcast as a pay-per-view special.

Voodoo Lounge Live was first released on VHS in late 1995 and then on DVD in 1998. Of the 27 songs played at the concert, 17 were included in the home video.

== Track listing ==
All songs written by Mick Jagger and Keith Richards except where noted

1. Introduction by Whoopi Goldberg
2. "Not Fade Away" (Buddy Holly, Norman Petty)
3. "Tumbling Dice"
4. "You Got Me Rocking"
5. "(I Can't Get No) Satisfaction"
6. "Angie"
7. "Sweet Virginia"
8. "It's All Over Now" (Bobby Womack, Shirley Womack)
9. "Stop Breaking Down" (Robert Johnson) – with Robert Cray
10. "Who Do You Love?" (Bo Diddley) – with Bo Diddley
11. "Miss You"
12. Band introductions
13. "Honky Tonk Women"
14. "The Worst"
15. "Sympathy for the Devil"
16. "Start Me Up"
17. "It's Only Rock 'n Roll (But I Like It)"
18. "Brown Sugar"
19. "Jumpin' Jack Flash"

== Voodoo Lounge Uncut ==
Voodoo Lounge Uncut
- Voodoo Lounge Uncut LP cover

Live album by The Rolling Stones
- Released: 16 November 2018
- Recorded: 25 November 1994
- Venue: Joe Robbie Stadium, Miami
- Genre: Rock
- Label: Eagle

The Rolling Stones chronology
On Air (2017)	Voodoo Lounge Uncut (2018)	Honk (2019)

An extended and re-edited version of Voodoo Lounge Live including the entire concert, titled Voodoo Lounge Uncut, was released on DVD and CD, Blu-ray and CD, LP, and as audio and video digital downloads, on 16 November 2018.

=== Critical reception ===
On All About Jazz, Doug Collette wrote,"If there's anything better than issuing a previously-unreleased recording of some kind, it's putting out a fully-restored piece once available only in part.... Prior to this DVD/2CD (or Blu-ray/2CD and limited vinyl) package, only portions of this November 1994 concert have been available in various formats, but this one compensates and then some."

In Glide Magazine, Leslie Michelle Derrough wrote, "Coming near the end of the American leg, this particular show drew over 55,000 fans to see the iconic rock stars perform some of their most famous tunes – 'Honky Tonk Women', 'Jumpin' Jack Flash', 'It's Only Rock n' Roll' – for the first time without bass player Bill Wyman. Wyman had retired and Darryl Jones was just getting his feet wet as part of the Stones after time in Sting's solo band. Jones brought with him a funky ambiance, enabling the Stones to surf on some new rhythm waves."

=== Track listing ===
All songs written by Mick Jagger and Keith Richards except where noted

1. Introduction by Whoopi Goldberg
2. "Not Fade Away" (Holly, Petty)
3. "Tumbling Dice"
4. "You Got Me Rocking"
5. "Rocks Off" (Note: Not included in the original 1995 video)
6. "Sparks Will Fly"
7. "Live With Me" – with Sheryl Crow
8. "(I Can't Get No) Satisfaction"
9. "Beast of Burden"
10. "Angie"
11. "Dead Flowers"
12. "Sweet Virginia"
13. "Doo Doo Doo Doo Doo (Heartbreaker)"
14. "It's All Over Now" (B. Womack, S. Womack)
15. "Stop Breaking Down" (Johnson) – with Robert Cray
16. "Who Do You Love?" (Diddley) – with Bo Diddley
17. "I Go Wild"
18. "Miss You"
19. "Honky Tonk Women"
20. "Before They Make Me Run"
21. "The Worst"
22. "Sympathy for the Devil"
23. "Monkey Man"
24. "Street Fighting Man"
25. "Start Me Up"
26. "It's Only Rock 'n Roll (But I Like It)"
27. "Brown Sugar"
28. "Jumpin' Jack Flash"

DVD / Blu-ray bonus tracks – filmed 14 August 1994 at Giants Stadium in East Rutherford, New Jersey:

29. "Shattered"
30. "Out of Tears"
31. "All Down the Line"
32. "I Can't Get Next to You" (Norman Whitfield, Barrett Strong)
33. "Happy"

== Official souvenir video ==
A VHS video called Live Voodoo Lounge, with "Official Souvenir Video" written on the back cover, was available for sale and order during the Voodoo Lounge Tour. It was filmed on 14 August 1994 at Giants Stadium in East Rutherford, New Jersey.

=== Track listing ===
All songs written by Mick Jagger and Keith Richards except where noted

1. Introduction
2. "Not Fade Away" (Holly, Petty)
3. "Tumbling Dice"
4. "You Got Me Rocking"
5. "Shattered"
6. "Rocks Off"
7. "Sparks Will Fly"
8. "(I Can't Get No) Satisfaction"
9. "Out of Tears"
10. "Miss You"
11. Band introductions
12. "Honky Tonk Women"
13. "The Worst"
14. "Start Me Up"
15. "It's Only Rock 'n Roll (But I Like It)"
16. "Street Fighting Man"
17. "Brown Sugar"
18. "Jumpin' Jack Flash"

== Personnel ==
The Rolling Stones

- Mick Jagger – lead vocals, guitar, harmonica
- Keith Richards – guitar, backing vocals, lead vocals on "Before They Make Me Run", "The Worst"
- Ronnie Wood – guitar
- Charlie Watts – drums

Additional musicians

- Darryl Jones – bass
- Chuck Leavell – keyboards
- Bobby Keys – saxophone
- Lisa Fischer – backing vocals
- Bernard Fowler – backing vocals, percussion

New West Horns

- Andy Snitzer – saxophone
- Michael Davis – trombone
- Kent Smith – trumpet

Special guests

- Robert Cray – vocals, guitar
- Bo Diddley – vocals, guitar
- Sheryl Crow – vocals

Other

- Whoopi Goldberg – host
- David Mallet – director

== Charts ==
Chart performance for Voodoo Lounge Uncut
Chart (2018)	Peak position
Belgian Albums (Ultratop Flanders)	41
Belgian Albums (Ultratop Wallonia)	56
Dutch Albums (Album Top 100)	27
French Albums (SNEP)	147

== Certifications ==
Certifications for Voodoo Lounge Uncut
Region	Certification	Certified units/sales
France (SNEP) video	Gold	5,000^{*}
^{*} Sales figures based on certification alone.
