= Live with Me =

1969 song by the Rolling Stones

Song by the Rolling Stones

from the album Let It Bleed
- Released: 5 December 1969
- Recorded: 24 May 1969
- Genre: Hard rock
- Length: 3:33
- Label: Decca Records/ABKCO
- Songwriter: Jagger/Richards
- Producer: Jimmy Miller

"Live with Me" is a song by the Rolling Stones from their album Let It Bleed, released in December 1969. It was the first song recorded with the band's new guitarist Mick Taylor, who joined the band in June 1969, although the first record the band released with Taylor was the single version of "Honky Tonk Women". Taylor later described the recording of "Live with Me" as "kind of the start of that particular era for the Stones, where Keith and I traded licks".

The song also marks the first time the Stones recorded with tenor saxophonist Bobby Keys (who played on many Stones records thereafter), and the only time Leon Russell would play with the Stones. Russell and Nicky Hopkins contributed piano to the piece.

Written by Mick Jagger and Richards, "Live with Me" was recorded on 24 May 1969. As Taylor joined the band weeks later, his guitar part was dubbed over the basic track. Along with "Country Honk", this was one of the two songs on Let it Bleed that guitarist Mick Taylor played on. He and Keith Richards created an original 2-lead guitar sound.

The song's lyrics were cited as the reason the London Bach Choir asked not to be credited for their contribution to "You Can't Always Get What You Want". The poet X. J. Kennedy suggested that the lyrics are part of a tradition of responses, beginning with John Donne and Sir Walter Raleigh and continuing through C. Day-Lewis, to Christopher Marlowe's "The Passionate Shepherd to His Love". Marlowe's poem begins "Come live with me and be my love".

Although never released as a single, the song has been frequently performed live, and concert versions appear on the albums Get Yer Ya-Ya's Out!, No Security, and Light the Fuse, as well as the 1996 "Wild Horses" (live) single and the Rarities 1971–2003 compilation album. A live version recorded in 1971 at the Roundhouse appears on the 2015 Deluxe edition bonus disc of Sticky Fingers, likewise a live version recorded at University of Leeds in 1971 featured in the album Get Yer Leeds Leeds Lungs Out (exclusively released on the 2015's Super Deluxe edition of Sticky Fingers). The song was performed live with Christina Aguilera for the concert film Shine a Light, and appears on the accompanying soundtrack album.

== Personnel ==
The Rolling Stones

- Mick Jagger – vocals
- Keith Richards – guitar, bass guitar
- Mick Taylor – guitar
- Charlie Watts – drums

Additional personnel

- Nicky Hopkins – piano
- Bobby Keys – tenor saxophone
- Leon Russell – piano, horn arrangement
