= Some Girls: Live in Texas '78 =

Live album by the Rolling Stones
- Released: 15 November 2011
- Recorded: 18 July 1978
- Venues: Will Rogers Auditorium, Fort Worth, Texas, United States
- Genre: Rock
- Length: DVD: 85:00; Bonus features: 41:00; CD: 79:58
- Labels: Polydor; Eagle Rock Entertainment

The Rolling Stones chronology
Brussels Affair (Live 1973) (2011)	Some Girls: Live in Texas '78 (2011)	Hampton Coliseum (Live 1981) (2012)

The Rolling Stones video chronology
Shine a Light (2008)	Some Girls: Live in Texas '78 (2011)	Live at the Checkerboard Lounge, Chicago 1981 (2012)

Some Girls: Live in Texas '78 is a live concert film by the Rolling Stones released in 2011. This live performance was recorded and filmed in 16 mm during one show at the Will Rogers Auditorium in Fort Worth, Texas, on 18 July 1978, during their US Tour 1978 in support of their album Some Girls. The concert film was released on DVD/Blu-ray Disc, combo (DVD & CD set) and (Blu-ray Disc & CD set) on 15 November 2011. Initially the CD was exclusive to the combo sets, but got a stand-alone release in June 2017.

== Track listing ==
All tracks are written by Mick Jagger and Keith Richards, except where noted.

Some Girls: Live in Texas '78 track listing
No.	Title	Writer(s)	Length
1.	"Let It Rock"	Chuck Berry
2.	"All Down the Line"
3.	"Honky Tonk Women"
4.	"Star Star"
5.	"When the Whip Comes Down"
6.	"Beast of Burden"
7.	"Miss You"
8.	"Just My Imagination (Running Away with Me)"	Norman Whitfield; Barrett Strong
9.	"Shattered"
10.	"Respectable"
11.	"Far Away Eyes""
12.	"Love in Vain"	Robert Johnson
13.	"Tumbling Dice"
14.	"Happy"
15.	"Sweet Little Sixteen"	Chuck Berry
16.	"Brown Sugar"
17.	"Jumpin' Jack Flash"

=== Bonus features (DVD/Blu-ray only) ===
- Mick Jagger – 2011 interview (15m)

Saturday Night Live (7 October 1978) (21m)

1. "Tomorrow" (with Dan Aykroyd and Mick Jagger)
2. "Beast of Burden"
3. "Respectable"
4. "Shattered"

ABC News 20/20 interviews with The Rolling Stones (Airdate: 20 June 1978) (5 min)

- Interviewed by Geraldo Rivera during tour-rehearsal, Woodstock, New York, June 1978

== Personnel ==
The Rolling Stones

- Mick Jagger – lead vocals, guitar, electric piano
- Keith Richards – guitars, backing and lead vocals
- Ronnie Wood – guitars, backing vocals, pedal steel guitar
- Bill Wyman – bass guitar
- Charlie Watts – drums

Additional personnel

- Ian Stewart – piano
- Ian McLagan – organ, electric and acoustic pianos, backing vocals
- Doug Kershaw – violin on "Far Away Eyes"

Original 1978 production crew

- Jerry Carraway
- Live sound recording by BJ Schiller
- 24 track recording by Michael Garvey
- Produced by Jack Calmes
- Directed by Lynn Lenau Calmes
- Lead cameraman: Phillip Thomas
- Camera operator: Jerry Calloway
- Camera operator: Richard Kooris
- Camera operator: Philip Pheiffer
- Film loader: Bob Hall
- Assistant camera: Michael McClary
- Assistant camera: Wes Dempster

2011 production

- Audio mix by Bob Clearmountain
- Director of film production Phil Davey
