= Singles 1968–1971 =

Box set by The Rolling Stones
- Released: 28 February 2005
- Recorded: February 1968 – April 1970
- Genre: Rock
- Length: 92:47
- Label: Decca/ABKCO
- Producers: Jimmy Miller, Andrew Loog Oldham

The Rolling Stones chronology
Live Licks (2004)	Singles 1968–1971 (2005)	A Bigger Bang (2005)

Professional ratings
Review scores
Source	Rating
AllMusic	4/5 stars
Encyclopedia of Popular Music	5/5 stars
Tom Hull	B+
Uncut	4/5 stars

Singles 1968–1971 is a box set compilation of singles by the Rolling Stones spanning the years 1968 to 1971. Released in 2005 by ABKCO Records, who license the Rolling Stones' 1963–1970 recorded works, Singles 1968–1971 was the third of three successive volumes to commemorate their non-LP releases during this era.

While the set features faithful replicas of all individual single covers (even the CDs are reproduced in black), the set – and both of its predecessors – came under some criticism as to their necessity, especially as 1989's Singles Collection: The London Years already covered this material to satisfaction. Furthermore, the last half of this collection concentrates on post-contractual material from Metamorphosis and the 2003 "Sympathy for the Devil" remixes by the Neptunes. However, Singles 1968–1971 does manage to include a bonus DVD of visual material of four songs that stretch the entire decade of the 1960s.

== Track listing ==
All songs by Mick Jagger and Keith Richards, except where noted.

Disc one

1. "Jumpin' Jack Flash" – 3:38
2. "Child of the Moon" – 3:12

Disc two

1. "Street Fighting Man" – 3:09
  - This is the original single mix from the 1968 American single
2. "No Expectations" – 3:55
3. "Surprise, Surprise" – 2:30
4. "Everybody Needs Somebody to Love" (Solomon Burke/Bert Russell/Jerry Wexler) – 5:03

Disc three

1. "Honky Tonk Women" – 3:00
2. "You Can't Always Get What You Want" – 4:50

Disc four

1. "Memo from Turner" – 4:07
  - Released as a Mick Jagger solo single in 1970
2. "Natural Magic" (Jack Nitzsche) – 1:39
  - Ry Cooder instrumental from the film Performance

Disc five

1. "Brown Sugar" – 3:49
2. "Bitch" – 3:36

Disc six

1. "Wild Horses" – 5:42
2. "Sway" – 3:47

Disc seven

1. "I Don't Know Why" (Stevie Wonder/Paul Riser/Don Hunter/Lula Hardaway) – 3:01
2. "Try a Little Harder" – 2:17

Disc eight

1. "Out of Time" – 3:22
2. "Jiving Sister Fanny" – 3:20

Disc nine

1. "Sympathy for the Devil" – 6:17
2. "Sympathy for the Devil" (The Neptunes remix) – 5:54
3. "Sympathy for the Devil" (Fatboy Slim remix) – 8:24
4. "Sympathy for the Devil" (Full Phatt remix) – 5:36

Bonus DVD

1. "Time Is on My Side" (Norman Meade) (live on The Ed Sullivan Show)
2. "Have You Seen Your Mother, Baby, Standing in the Shadow?" (live, Fall 1966)
3. "Jumpin' Jack Flash" (promotional film)
4. "Sympathy for the Devil" (The Neptunes remix video)
