= On Air (Rolling Stones album) =

Live album by the Rolling Stones
- Released: 1 December 2017
- Recorded: 1963–1965
- Studio: BBC
- Genres: Rock, blues
- Length: 49:00 Standard edition 84:00 Deluxe edition
- Labels: Interscope, Polydor

The Rolling Stones chronology
Ladies and Gentlemen: The Rolling Stones (2017)	On Air (2017)	Voodoo Lounge Uncut (2018)

Professional ratings
Aggregate scores
Source	Rating
Metacritic	82/100
Review scores
Source	Rating
AllMusic	4.5/5 stars
Rolling Stone	4.5/5 stars
Tom Hull	B+
Vice (Expert Witness)	A−

On Air is a live album by the Rolling Stones released on 1 December 2017. The standard versions of the album contain 18 live and studio recordings of the band aired on the BBC in 1963–1965. Deluxe editions of the album contain an additional 14 tracks. It emerged 20 years after initial newspaper reports that such an album could be forthcoming.

== Background ==
On Air is a compilation album containing live in the studio performances by the Rolling Stones that were broadcast on various BBC radio shows from 1963 to 1965, including blues and rock 'n' roll covers and early Jagger/Richards hits such as "The Last Time" and "(I Can't Get No) Satisfaction". The album was released in multiple formats, including CD, double-CD deluxe edition, heavyweight vinyl and special limited-edition coloured vinyl. The release follows that of a coffee table book by Richard Havers, which shares the same title.

The standard versions of the album contain 18 tracks, while the deluxe editions contain 32 tracks. Eight of the tracks have never been recorded or released commercially by the band. The quality of the individual recordings varies considerably, with some being recorded in mono, and others in stereo. Despite this, the Los Angeles Times considered many of the tracks to be "crisp, clean and potent".

== Critical reception ==
The album received a favourable Metacritic score of 84, with Uncut calling it "essentially [a] sequel" to the band's previous album, Blue & Lonesome, which was released in December 2016. Uncut also stated that On Air captures the "full flowering" of the Jagger/Richards songwriting relationship. The Los Angeles Times considered the album to be comparable to similar, previously released BBC recordings made by the Beatles during the period. Robert Christgau wrote in Vice: "Billed 'R&B' as they started playing out in 1963, the Stones were catchier and quicker than blues, and on these 32 radio transcriptions they sound like the premier bar band of their time if not ever. Where Blue & Lonesome is a sodden thing – many old rockers have recorded sharper, spunkier, wiser music – this collection proves what world-beaters they were even before they got serious about songwriting."

== Track listing ==
Standard edition
No.	Title	Writer(s)	Radio show	Date	Length
1.	"Come On"	Chuck Berry	Saturday Club	26 October 1963	2:03
2.	"(I Can't Get No) Satisfaction"	Mick Jagger, Keith Richards	Saturday Club	18 September 1965	3:46
3.	"Roll Over Beethoven"	Chuck Berry	Saturday Club	26 October 1963	2:19
4.	"The Spider and the Fly"	Mick Jagger, Keith Richards	Yeah Yeah	30 August 1965	3:14
5.	"Cops and Robbers"	Kent Harris	Blues in Rhythm	9 May 1964	3:44
6.	"It's All Over Now"	Bobby Womack, Shirley Womack	The Joe Loss Pop Show	17 July 1964	3:18
7.	"Route 66"	Bobby Troup	Blues in Rhythm	9 May 1964	2:32
8.	"Memphis, Tennessee"	Chuck Berry	Saturday Club	26 October 1963	2:22
9.	"Down the Road a Piece"	Don Raye	Top Gear	6 March 1965	2:01
10.	"The Last Time"	Mick Jagger, Keith Richards	Top Gear	6 March 1965	3:10
11.	"Cry to Me"	Bert Berns	Saturday Club	18 September 1965	3:07
12.	"Mercy, Mercy"	Don Covay, Ronald Miller	Yeah Yeah	30 August 1965	2:54
13.	"Oh! Baby (We Got a Good Thing Goin')"	Barbara Lynn	Saturday Club	18 September 1965	1:49
14.	"Around and Around"	Chuck Berry	Top Gear	23 July 1964	2:45
15.	"Hi-Heel Sneakers"	Tommy Tucker	Saturday Club	18 April 1964	1:56
16.	"Fannie Mae"	Buster Brown, Clarence L. Lewis, Bobby Robinson	Saturday Club	18 September 1965	2:11
17.	"You Better Move On"	Arthur Alexander	Blues in Rhythm	9 May 1964	2:46
18.	"Mona"	Bo Diddley	Blues in Rhythm	9 May 1964	2:58

Deluxe bonus tracks
No.	Title	Writer(s)	Radio show	Date	Length
1.	"I Wanna Be Your Man"	John Lennon, Paul McCartney	Saturday Club	8 February 1964	1:52
2.	"Carol"	Chuck Berry	Saturday Club	18 April 1964	2:31
3.	"I'm Moving On"	Hank Snow	The Joe Loss Pop Show	10 April 1964	2:06
4.	"If You Need Me"	Wilson Pickett, Sonny Sanders, Robert Bateman	The Joe Loss Pop Show	17 July 1964	2:01
5.	"Walking the Dog"	Rufus Thomas	Saturday Club	8 February 1964	2:59
6.	"Confessin' the Blues"	Jay McShann, Walter Brown	The Joe Loss Pop Show	17 July 1964	2:26
7.	"Everybody Needs Somebody to Love"	Solomon Burke, Bert Berns, Jerry Wexler	Top Gear	6 March 1965	3:34
8.	"Little by Little"	Mick Jagger, Keith Richards, Phil Spector	The Joe Loss Pop Show	10 April 1964	2:30
9.	"Ain't That Lovin' You, Baby"	Jimmy Reed	Rhythm and Blues	31 October 1964	1:56
10.	"Beautiful Delilah"	Chuck Berry	Saturday Club	18 April 1964	2:10
11.	"Crackin' Up"	Bo Diddley	Top Gear	23 July 1964	2:16
12.	"I Can't Be Satisfied"	Muddy Waters	Top Gear	23 July 1964	2:30
13.	"I Just Want to Make Love to You"	Willie Dixon	Saturday Club	18 April 1964	2:16
14.	"2120 South Michigan Avenue"	Nanker Phelge	Rhythm and Blues	31 October 1964	3:47

== Personnel ==
Musicians

- Mick Jagger – vocals, harmonica
- Keith Richards – guitar, backing vocals
- Brian Jones – guitar, harmonica
- Bill Wyman – bass, backing vocals
- Charlie Watts – drums
- Ian Stewart – piano on "Down the Road a Piece", "Everybody Needs Somebody to Love"

Production

- Engineering: Chris Bolster, Lewis Jones, John Barrett, Paul Pritchard
- Demixing: James Clarke
- Mastering: Alex Wharton
- Text: Richard Havers
- Design: Studio Fury
- Cover image: Hulton Archive

== Charts ==
Chart (2017)	Peak position
Australian Albums (ARIA)	54
Austrian Albums (Ö3 Austria)	19
Belgian Albums (Ultratop Flanders)	12
Belgian Albums (Ultratop Wallonia)	23
Canadian Albums (Billboard)	58
Croatian International Albums (HDU)	4
Czech Albums (ČNS IFPI)	40
Dutch Albums (Album Top 100)	8
German Albums (Offizielle Top 100)	10
Greek Albums (IFPI)	35
Irish Albums (IRMA)	36
Italian Albums (FIMI)	22
Japanese Albums (Oricon)	16
New Zealand Heatseeker Albums (RMNZ)	4
Norwegian Albums (VG-lista)	24
Portuguese Albums (AFP)	36
Scottish Albums (Official Charts)	20
South Korean International Albums (Gaon)	9
Swedish Albums (Sverigetopplistan)	22
Swiss Albums (Schweizer Hitparade)	22
UK Albums (Official Charts)	27
US Billboard 200	47
US Top Rock Albums (Billboard)	4
