= Story of The Stones =

Compilation album by the Rolling Stones
- Released: November 1982
- Recorded: 1963–1969
- Genre: Rock
- Length: 78:00
- Label: K-Tel

The Rolling Stones chronology
Still Life (1981)	Story of The Stones (1982)	Undercover (1983)

Story of The Stones is a compilation album of the Rolling Stones, released in the UK in 1982. Released by the Irish arm of the mail order company K-tel, the double vinyl record or cassette tape album reached number 24 on the UK Albums Chart and being certified gold by the British Phonographic Industry for 100,000 units sold.

== Track listing ==
Side one

1. "(I Can't Get No) Satisfaction"
2. "It's All Over Now"
3. "Time is on My Side"
4. "Play With Fire"
5. "Off the Hook"
6. "Little Red Rooster"
7. "Let It Bleed"
8. "Have You Seen Your Mother, Baby, Standing in the Shadow?"

Side two

1. "Paint It Black"
2. "The Last Time"
3. "We Love You"
4. "You Better Move On"
5. "Under My Thumb"
6. "Come On"
7. "I Just Want to Make Love to You"
8. "Honky Tonk Women"

Side three

1. "Jumpin' Jack Flash"
2. "(Get Your Kicks On) Route 66"
3. "I Wanna Be Your Man"
4. "Mother's Little Helper"
5. "You Can't Always Get What You Want"
6. "Carol"
7. "Let's Spend the Night Together"

Side four

1. "Get Off Of My Cloud"
2. "19th Nervous Breakdown"
3. "Not Fade Away"
4. "Walking the Dog"
5. "Heart of Stone"
6. "Ruby Tuesday"
7. "Street Fighting Man"

== Certification ==
Country	Certification	Sales
United Kingdom	Gold	100,000
