= Honky Tonk Women =

1969 single by the Rolling Stones

Single by the Rolling Stones
- B-side: "You Can't Always Get What You Want"
- Released: July 1969
- Recorded: June 1969
- Studio: Olympic (London, England)
- Genre: Hard rock; rock and roll
- Length: 3:03
- Label: Decca (UK); London (US)
- Songwriter: Jagger–Richards
- Producer: Jimmy Miller

Rolling Stones UK singles chronology
"Jumpin' Jack Flash" (1968)	"Honky Tonk Women" (1969)	"Brown Sugar" (1971)

Rolling Stones US singles chronology
"Street Fighting Man" (1968)	"Honky Tonk Women" (1969)	"Brown Sugar" (1971)

Official audio
- "Honky Tonk Women" on YouTube

"Honky Tonk Women" is a song by the English rock band the Rolling Stones. It was released as a non-album single in July 1969 in the United Kingdom, and a week later in the United States (a country blues version called "Country Honk" was later included on their eighth studio album Let It Bleed). It topped the charts in both nations. The song was on Rolling Stone's 500 Greatest Songs of All Time list and was inducted into the Grammy Hall of Fame.

== Inspiration and recording ==
The song was written by Mick Jagger and Keith Richards while on holiday in Brazil from late December 1968 to early January 1969, inspired by Brazilian "caipiras" (inhabitants of rural, remote areas of parts of Brazil) at the ranch where Jagger and Richards were staying in Matão, São Paulo. Two versions of the song were recorded by the band: the familiar hit which appeared on the 45 single and their collection of late 1960s singles, Through the Past, Darkly (Big Hits Vol. 2), and a honky-tonk version entitled "Country Honk" with slightly different lyrics, which appeared on Let It Bleed (1969).

Thematically, a "honky tonk woman" refers to a dancing girl in a western bar; the setting for the narrative in the first verse of the rock-and-roll version is Memphis, Tennessee: "I met a gin soaked bar-room queen in Memphis", while "Country Honk" sets the first verse in Jackson, Mississippi: "I'm sittin' in a bar, tipplin' a jar in Jackson".

The band initially recorded the track called "Country Honk" in London in early March 1969. Brian Jones was present during these sessions and may have played on the first handful of takes and demos. It was his last recording session with the band. The song was transformed into the familiar electric, riff-based hit single "Honky Tonk Women" sometime in the spring of 1969, prior to Mick Taylor joining the group. In an interview in the magazine Crawdaddy! Richards credits Taylor for influencing the track: "the song was originally written as a real Hank Williams/Jimmie Rodgers/1930s country song. And it got turned around to this other thing by Mick Taylor, who got into a completely different feel, throwing it off the wall another way." However, in 1979 Taylor recalled it this way: "I definitely added something to Honky Tonk Women, but it was more or less complete by the time I arrived and did my overdubs."

"Honky Tonk Women" is distinctive as it opens not with a guitar riff but with a beat played on a cowbell by producer Jimmy Miller.

The piano part was played by Ian Stewart, according to Mick Jagger in a tribute after Stewart's death.

The concert rendition of "Honky Tonk Women" on Get Yer Ya-Ya's Out! (1970) differs significantly from the studio hit, with a markedly dissimilar guitar introduction and the first appearance on vinyl of an entirely different second verse.

== Release ==
The single was released in the UK the day after the death of founding member Brian Jones, with "You Can't Always Get What You Want" as the single's B-side. The picture sleeve was designed by John Kosh and photographed by Ethan Russell.

In the UK, the song remained on the charts for seventeen weeks, peaking at number one for five weeks. It remains the band's last single to reach number one in their home country. The song also topped the US Billboard Hot 100 for four weeks from 23 August 1969. It was later released on the compilation album Through the Past, Darkly (Big Hits Vol. 2) in September. Billboard ranked it as the No. 4 song overall for 1969.

At the time of its release, Rolling Stone magazine hailed "Honky Tonk Women" as "likely the strongest three minutes of rock and roll yet released in 1969". Record World said it was "the Rolling Stones at their funky best." It was ranked number 116 on the list of Rolling Stone's 500 Greatest Songs of All Time in April 2010. The song was later put into the track listing for the video game Band Hero. In 2014, the song was inducted into the Grammy Hall of Fame.

== Releases on compilation albums and live recordings ==
The single version of "Honky Tonk Women" appears on the following Rolling Stones compilation albums:

- Through the Past, Darkly (Big Hits Vol. 2) (1969)
- Gimme Shelter (1971)
- Hot Rocks 1964–1971 (1971)
- Rolled Gold: The Very Best of the Rolling Stones (1975)
- 30 Greatest Hits (1977)
- Solid Rock (1980)
- Story of The Stones (1982)
- Singles Collection: The London Years (1989)
- Forty Licks (2002)
- Singles 1968–1971 (2005)
- GRRR! (2012)
- The Rolling Stones in Mono (2016)

Concert versions of "Honky Tonk Women" are included on the albums Live'r Than You'll Ever Be (1969), 'Get Yer Ya-Ya's Out!' (recorded 1969, released 1970), Love You Live (recorded 1976, released 1977), Live Licks (recorded 2003, released 2004), Brussels Affair (Live 1973) (recorded 1973, released 2011), Hampton Coliseum (Live 1981) (recorded 1981, released 2012), L.A. Friday (Live 1975) (recorded 1975, released 2012), Live at the Tokyo Dome (recorded 1990, released 2012), Live at Leeds (recorded 1982, released 2012), Hyde Park Live (2013), Sticky Fingers (Deluxe and Super Deluxe editions) (recorded 1971, released 2015), Totally Stripped (recorded 1995, released 2016), and Havana Moon (2016). The song has appeared in numerous Stones concert films and boxed sets, including Stones in the Park, Some Girls: Live in Texas '78, Let's Spend the Night Together, Stones at the Max, Voodoo Lounge Live, Bridges to Babylon Tour '97–98, Four Flicks, The Biggest Bang, Sweet Summer Sun: Hyde Park Live, and Havana Moon. Some of the live versions include a Paris verse not included on the original single.

== "Country Honk" ==
"Country Honk"

Song by the Rolling Stones

from the album Let It Bleed
- Released: 5 December 1969
- Recorded: June and October 1969
- Genre: Country rock; country
- Length: 3:10
- Label: Decca Records/ABKCO (UK); London (US)
- Songwriter: Jagger/Richards
- Producer: Jimmy Miller

"Country Honk" is a country version of "Honky Tonk Women", recorded before it but released five months later on the album Let It Bleed (1969). As noted above, the country arrangement was the original concept of "Honky Tonk Women". Richards has maintained that "Country Honk" is how "Honky Tonk Women" was originally written.

"Country Honk" was recorded at Olympic Studios. Byron Berline played the fiddle on the track, and has said that Gram Parsons was responsible for him being chosen for the job (Berline had previously recorded with Parsons' band the Flying Burrito Brothers). Producer Glyn Johns suggested that Berline should record his part on the pavement outside the studio to add ambiance to the number. Sam Cutler, the Rolling Stones' tour manager, performed the car horn at the beginning of the track. Nanette Workman performs backing vocals on this version (although the album sleeve credits actress Nanette Newman). Berline's fiddle and all vocals were recorded at Elektra. There is a bootleg recording in existence that contains neither the fiddle nor Mick Taylor's slide guitar.

== Personnel ==
According to authors Philippe Margotin and Jean-Michel Guesdon, except where noted:

=== "Honky Tonk Women" ===
The Rolling Stones

- Mick Jagger – lead vocals, backing vocals
- Keith Richards – backing vocals, lead guitar, rhythm guitar
- Mick Taylor – lead guitar (fills)
- Bill Wyman – bass
- Charlie Watts – drums

Additional personnel

- Ian Stewart – piano (Note: Margotin and Guesdon write Stewart contributed piano, while authors Andy Babiuk and Greg Prevost write it was Nicky Hopkins.)
- Jimmy Miller – cowbell
- Steve Gregory and Bud Beadle – saxophones
- Johnny Almond – saxophone arrangements
- Madeline Bell – backing vocals (Note: While Babiuk and Prevost credit Bell with the song's backing vocals, Margotin and Guesdon instead write it was Reparata and the Delrons, Doris Troy and Nanette Workman.)

=== "Country Honk" ===
The Rolling Stones

- Mick Jagger – vocals, car horn (Note: Margotin and Guesdon are uncertain whether Jagger or the Stones' tour manager, Sam Cutler, honked the car's horn. Babiuk and Prevost write the horn was from Cutler's car.)
- Keith Richards – backing vocals, acoustic guitar
- Mick Taylor – steel slide guitar
- Charlie Watts – drums

Additional personnel

- Byron Berline – fiddle
- Nanette Workman – backing vocals

== Charts ==
=== Weekly charts ===
Chart (1969)	Peak position
Australia (Go-Set)	1
Austria (Ö3 Austria Top 40)	4
Belgium (Ultratop 50 Flanders)	5
Belgium (Ultratop 50 Wallonia)	4
Canada Top Singles (RPM)	2
Denmark (IFPI)	1
Finland (Suomen virallinen lista)	5
Germany (GfK)	2
Ireland (IRMA)	1
Netherlands (Single Top 100)	4
New Zealand (Listener)	1
Norway (VG-lista)	2
Spain (AFE)	5
Sweden (Kvällstoppen)	2
Switzerland (Schweizer Hitparade)	1
UK Singles (Official Charts)	1
US Billboard Hot 100	1
US Cash Box Top 100]	1

=== Year-end charts ===
Chart (1969)	Rank
Canada Top Singles (RPM)	16
US Billboard Hot 100	4
US Cash Box Top 100	2

=== All-time charts ===
Chart (1958–2018)	Position
US Billboard Hot 100	195

== Certifications ==
Region	Certification	Certified units/sales
Australia (ARIA)	Platinum	70,000^{‡}
New Zealand (RMNZ)	Platinum	30,000^{‡}
United Kingdom (BPI)	Silver	200,000^{‡}
United States (RIAA)	Gold	1,000,000^{^}
^{^} Shipments figures based on certification alone.^{‡} Sales+streaming figures based on certification alone.
