= Tumbling Dice =

1972 single by the Rolling Stones

Single by the Rolling Stones

from the album Exile on Main St.
- B-side: "Sweet Black Angel"
- Released: 14 April 1972
- Recorded: 7 June 1971 – March 1972
- Studio: Rolling Stones Mobile Studio; Villa Nellcôte, France; Sunset Sound, Hollywood
- Genre: Rock and roll; blues rock
- Length: 3:45
- Label: Rolling Stones
- Songwriter: Jagger–Richards
- Producer: Jimmy Miller

The Rolling Stones singles chronology
"Wild Horses" (1971)	"Tumbling Dice" (1972)	"Happy" (1972)

"Tumbling Dice" is a song by the English rock band the Rolling Stones. It was released worldwide as the lead single from the band's 1972 double album Exile on Main St. on 14 April 1972 by Rolling Stones Records. A product of Mick Jagger and Keith Richards' songwriting partnership, the song contains a blues and boogie-woogie-influenced rhythm that scholars and musicians have noted for its unusual tempo and groove. The lyrics are about a gambler who cannot remain faithful to any woman.

"Tumbling Dice" spent eight weeks on the UK Singles Chart, peaking at number five. In the US, the single peaked at number seven on the Billboard Hot 100 chart. The song entered the top 10 in the Netherlands, Norway and Spain. "Tumbling Dice" received acclaim from contemporary music critics, who praised its musicianship and lyrical prowess. "Tumbling Dice" featured on many "best of" lists, including those by Vulture and Rolling Stone.

Jimmy Miller produced "Tumbling Dice". The Stones have performed the song during many of their concerts since its release in 1972. Several artists have covered "Tumbling Dice", including Linda Ronstadt, whose version – sung from a female perspective – appears on her 1977 album Simple Dreams. Ronstadt's version was a Top 40 hit the following year and is included on the soundtrack of the film FM (1978).

== Background and development ==
The Rolling Stones recorded "Tumbling Dice" at a pivotal stage in their history. While recording Exile on Main St. in 1971, the band became UK tax exiles and moved to southern France to avoid paying a 93 per cent supertax imposed by Prime Minister Harold Wilson's Labour government on the country's top earners. Recording schedules were erratic and happened at odd hours. According to drummer Charlie Watts, "a lot of Exile was done how Keith [Richards] works", which meant playing songs dozens of times, letting them "marinade" [sic] and repeating the cycle.

The band recorded an early iteration of "Tumbling Dice", called "Good Time Women", at Stargroves using the Rolling Stones Mobile Studio sometime between March and May 1970 during the sessions for their 1971 studio album Sticky Fingers. It shared a similar blues, boogie-woogie rhythm with "Tumbling Dice" but heavily emphasised Ian Stewart's piano work, had different lyrics and was incomplete. This song formed the basis for "Tumbling Dice", which the band developed the following year.

== Writing and recording ==
Jagger and Richards initially composed "Tumbling Dice" using filler lyrics consisting of a few simple phrases. Sound engineers Andy Johns, Glyn Johns, Joe Zagarino and Jeremy Gee recorded the song played in the basement of the Villa Nellcôte, near Villefranche-sur-Mer France, between 7 June and October 1971 using the Rolling Stones Mobile Studio. The song's basic track was recorded on 3 August 1971. That recording featured Mick Taylor playing bass because of Bill Wyman's unexplained absence with Jagger playing rhythm guitar. (Note: Richards and Taylor played bass on several tracks for Exile on Main St., something Richards later credited to the session's relaxed structure: "Not being done in a proper studio, it was a question of whoever was around just picking up the appropriate instruments and laying down the tracks. ... I might do the bass part or Mick Taylor might pick it up and play. Then Bill Wyman would turn up three hours later, but we'd laid down what we wanted so it wasn't worth doing it all over again.") In the liner notes to Jump Back: The Best of The Rolling Stones, Richards stated, "I remember writing the riff upstairs in the very elegant front room, and we took it downstairs the same evening and we cut it." In addition to playing with a capo on the fourth fret, Richards employed five-string open G tuning – dubbed "Keef-chord" tuning after he used it on several Exile On Main St. tracks.

The song was completed at Sunset Sound Studios in Los Angeles between November 1971 and March 1972. Jagger had finished the lyrics after speaking with a housekeeper about gambling in Los Angeles. He explained, "she liked to play dice and I really didn't know much about it. But I got it off of her and managed to make the song out of that." According to music journalist Bill Janovitz, it was "not pure kismet" that Jagger thought to speak to the housekeeper, saying he was "consciously turning over rocks, looking for something specific". Janovitz believes Jagger may already have had the idea for the "well-worn lover/gambler/rambler trope, but needed the particulars to come up with something like, 'I'm all sixes and sevens and nines'."

Discussing "Tumbling Dice", recording engineer Andy Johns said that recording the song was "like pulling teeth" because of the time it took to get a satisfactory take. Johns has claimed there were between thirty and one hundred reels of tape of the song's base track, and some have said it may have taken as many as 150 takes to complete it. Mixing the album was also difficult; Jagger has never liked the final mix of the song, saying in an interview with Melody Maker, "I think they used the wrong mix for that one. I know they did." Rolling Stone associate editor Robert Greenfield, who was present at the mixing sessions, later recalled Jagger telling producer Jimmy Miller that he was okay with either mix.

== Music and lyrics ==
"Tumbling Dice"
Featuring a blues, boogie-woogie rhythm, "Tumbling Dice" is a song that scholars and musicians have noted for its unusual tempo and groove. Charlie Watts' drumming is credited by music critic Ben Sisario with giving the song's backbeat a "languid strut". The song's lyrics are about a gambler who cannot remain faithful to one woman.

"Tumbling Dice" is known for its groove. Aerosmith's Joe Perry described the song as, "so laid-back, it really sucks you in ..." Joe Strummer of the Clash says "Tumbling Dice" is "not a straightforward tempo" but is "halfway between a slow and straightforward rocker". Music critic Bill Janovitz credits the song's "perfect tempo", "slight drag" and "shuffle" with creating that groove. In concert, Jagger and Richards have been known to argue over the speed of the song, with Jagger trying to push the song's tempo a bit faster.

It was acknowledged forty years after the release of "Tumbling Dice" that Miller played the last part of the song, right as the coda begins, because Watts was having trouble with it. "Tumbling Dice" was the only Rolling Stones song where Watts overdubbed a second drum track over the original, creating a bigger sound. In a retrospective article shortly after Watts' death, Ben Sisario wrote for The New York Times that Watts' backbeat gave "Tumbling Dice" a "languid strut".

The song's lyrical structure is irregular. While many songs have the same number of lines for the verse or chorus, the first verse of "Tumbling Dice" has eight, the second six, and the third two lines. The song's first chorus has two lines, the second has three, and the third has twelve lines. At the beginning of each chorus, the piano, bass and drums drop out and the backing vocals sing "you got to roll me" as the guitar plays the song's signature guitar figure. The third chorus leads into the song's coda. Slowly, the band's rhythm section works its way back into the song. The coda includes a call and response with the backing vocals singing "you got to roll me" as Jagger and Richards respond by singing "keep on rollin'".

== Release ==
Rolling Stones Records released "Tumbling Dice" worldwide on 14 April 1972 – the Stones' 23rd US single and their 17th in the UK. "Tumbling Dice"'s B-side features "Sweet Black Angel". American artist Ruby Mazur created the single's sleeve. The song is the fifth track on Exile on Main St.. On 21 May 1972, Top of the Pops broadcast a film of the Stones rehearsing "Tumbling Dice" in Montreux for their 1972 tour. On 27 May 1972, The Old Grey Whistle Test showed the same footage.

"Tumbling Dice" appears on Stones' compilations and live albums, including the 1977 double album Love You Live, Shine a Light (2006), and Hyde Park Live. The song is included on several "From the Vault" archive releases, including Hampton Coliseum – Live In 1981 (2014) and L.A. Forum – Live In 1975 (2014). A unique, live version of the song was recorded for Stripped, the 1995 CD that documented part of the Voodoo Lounge Tour but did not appear on that album or on the 2016 re-release CD, Totally Stripped. The recording crossfades from a backstage vocal rehearsal of the song on solo piano to an onstage performance of the song. The backstage rehearsal portion was recorded at the Paradiso, Amsterdam, on 26 or 27 May 1995, and the live performance at the Olympia, Paris, on 3 July 1995. This recording appears on the 1996 "Wild Horses" (live) single and the Rarities 1971–2003 album.

Many Stones concert films have included "Tumbling Dice": Ladies and Gentlemen: The Rolling Stones (1974), Let's Spend the Night Together (1983), Stones at the Max (1992), The Rolling Stones: Voodoo Lounge Live (1995; extended version, 2018), Bridges to Babylon Tour '97–98 (1998), Rolling Stones – Four Flicks (2003), The Biggest Bang (2007), Shine a Light (2008), Some Girls: Live in Texas '78 (2011) and Sweet Summer Sun: Hyde Park Live (2013).

== Critical reception and legacy ==
"Tumbling Dice" received acclaim from music critics, with many praising its musicianship. Los Angeles Times music critic Robert Hilburn asserted that it "features marvelously sensual guitar work by Richards" and that it should rank with "Satisfaction", "Street Fighting Man" and "Honky Tonk Women" "as one of the Stones' classic concert numbers". The Boston Globe critic Ernie Santosuosso agreed, finding the "chorale" to be "outstanding" and the lyrics "intriguing". Peter Barsocchini described the guitar work of Richards and Mick Taylor as "sassy" in a review for The Times. Record World called it an "exciting release" with a "phenomenal rhythm track, vocal chorus". Writing for the Daily News, music critic Jerry Oster found "Tumbling Dice" and "Happy" to be the two songs on Exile on Main St. that had "all the energy and dynamism on which this greatness was founded" and that it came through "overpoweringly". He considered it to be "music that, in a time when dancing is dead, not only can be danced to, but must be".

The drum work by Charlie Watts was also praised. Rolling Stone critic Lenny Kaye considered the guitar work and drumming of Watts to build to a "kind of majesty the Stones at their best have always provided". In a retrospective review for Spin, music critic Al Shipley described every note of the song as "perfection" where every "hooky little moment" is accompanied by a "perfect Charlie Watts snare fill". David Morgan of CBS News asserted that Watts' percussion on the single was "remarkable".

Several critics complimented the tempo and groove of the single. Music critic Jack Garner asserted in a review for Courier News that the song featured a "marvellous tempo". Shipley felt the song has an "irresistible singalong energy", describing the "breakdown and buildup into the final 'you got to roll me' refrain" as "sublime". Critic Bill Janovitz described "Tumbling Dice" in his 2014 book Rocks Off as the "Holy Grail of grooves".

The lyrics of "Tumbling Dice" were well received by critics. Barsocchini considered its lyrics to be "provocative". Garner agreed, stating in a review for Courier News that the lyrics contained "wonderfully sexy double entendre[s]".

Critics frequently considered "Tumbling Dice" to be one of the best songs on Exile. Oster asserted that "Tumbling Dice" was among the eight songs he would keep on Exile, using the others for "hairspray or frisbees". Kaye considered the single to be "a cherry on the first side" of Exile and the only song on the album that made "real moves towards a classic". Ultimate Classic Rock critic Kyle Dowling agreed, calling it a "true standout" of the album and a "classic piece of rock and roll music", noting that it was a persistent favourite in live performances. Morgan agreed with Dowling, calling it a "classic". David Marchese wrote for Vulture that the song "achieves choogle nirvana", expressing surprise that despite a "near-consensus" that Exile on Main St. was the best Stones album, it did not produce any other big singles.

According to Janovitz, Rod Stewart "so coveted" the song that he took a tape of it into his Foot Loose & Fancy Free (1977) sessions "to play to the band he had assembled to record "Hot Legs". The song has earned spots on numerous "best of" lists. Vulture ranked the single as the seventeenth best Rolling Stones song and Rolling Stone ranked "Tumbling Dice" number 424 on its list of the 500 Greatest Songs of All Time in 2004; Rolling Stone's 2021 update ranked it number 86.

== Commercial performance ==
"Tumbling Dice" debuted at number 18 on the 8 May 1972 UK Singles Chart. By 13 May, it had climbed to number 14 before peaking at number five on the chart dated 20 May. It remained on the chart for eight weeks. In the Netherlands, "Tumbling Dice" peaked at number five on the Single Top 100 chart. The single was a top 10 hit in other European countries, peaking at number six in Norway and number seven in Spain.

The song debuted at number 50 on the US Billboard Hot 100 chart for the week of 29 April 1972, and took five weeks to rise to number seven, where it stayed for one week. "Tumbling Dice" was a top 10 success on the US Cash Box Top 100 chart, peaking at number 10, and in Canada, where it peaked at number seven. In the Cash Box year-end chart, the song ranked number 92. However, the single had its biggest American chart success on Chicago metropolitan area radio stations such as WCFL (number one) and WLS (number four).

== Personnel ==
Credits per Margotin and Guesdon.

The Rolling Stones

- Mick Jagger – lead vocals, rhythm guitar
- Keith Richards – lead and rhythm guitars, backing vocals
- Mick Taylor – slide guitar, bass
- Charlie Watts – drums

Additional musicians and production

- Jimmy Miller – producer, drums (coda)
- Nicky Hopkins – piano
- Bobby Keys – saxophone
- Jim Price – trumpet, trombone
- Clydie King, Venetta Fields, Sherlie Matthews – backing vocals
- Andy Johns, Glyn Johns, Joe Zagarino, Jeremy Gee – sound engineers
- Robin Millar – assistant sound engineer

== Chart performance ==
=== Weekly charts ===
1972 weekly chart performance
Chart (1972)	Peak position
Australia (Go-Set)	11
Belgium (Ultratop 50 Flanders)	28
Canada Top Singles (RPM)	7
Finland (Soumen Virallinen)	26
Germany (GfK)	17
Ireland (IRMA)	14
Norway (VG-lista)	6
Netherlands (Single Top 100)	5
Spanish Singles Chart	7
Sweden (Kvällstoppen)	11
Sweden (Tio i Topp)	6
UK Singles (Official Charts)	5
US Billboard Hot 100	7
US Cash Box Top 100	10
US WCFL Top 40	1
US WLS Top 40	4

=== Year-end charts ===
1972 year-end chart performance
Chart (1972)	Rank
US (Cash Box)	92
US (Dave Marsh's Book of Rock Lists)	1

=== Certifications ===
Region	Certification	Certified units/sales
Australia (ARIA)	Gold	35,000^{‡}
^{‡} Sales+streaming figures based on certification alone.

== Live performances and other versions ==
The Rolling Stones have performed "Tumbling Dice" during multiple tours, including the 1972 North American Tour, European Tour 1973, The Rolling Stones American Tour 1981, Steel Wheels/Urban Jungle Tour, Voodoo Lounge Tour, No Security Tour, Licks Tour and A Bigger Bang Tour. Cover versions of "Tumbling Dice" have been recorded by other artists, including Linda Ronstadt, Pussy Galore and Keith Urban.

=== Linda Ronstadt version ===
"Tumbling Dice"
- Cover of the German single for "Tumbling Dice" with "Carmelita" as the B-side. The American version did not have a picture sleeve.

Single by Linda Ronstadt

from the album Simple Dreams
- B-side: "I Never Will Marry"
- Released: April 1978
- Recorded: 1977
- Genre: Rock
- Length: 3:05
- Label: Asylum
- Songwriter: Jagger–Richards
- Producer: Peter Asher

Linda Ronstadt singles chronology
"Poor Poor Pitiful Me" (1977)	"Tumbling Dice" (1978)	"Back in the USA" (1978)

In 1977, Linda Ronstadt covered the song "Tumbling Dice" for her Simple Dreams studio album. In an interview with Hit Parader magazine, she said that her band played "Tumbling Dice" for sound checks, but nobody knew the words. Jagger thought Ronstadt should sing more rock and roll songs, suggested "Tumbling Dice", and wrote out the lyrics for her.

The opening line of Ronstadt’s version varied significantly from the Rolling Stones. Their version begins with:

Women think I'm tasty but they're always tryin' to waste me.

Ronstadt opened with:

People try to rape me. Always think I'm crazy.

Produced by Peter Asher and released by Asylum Records as a single in the spring of 1978, Ronstadt's version peaked at number 32 on the Billboard Hot 100 chart. It was a Top 40 Adult Contemporary hit in both the US and Canada. She performed the song and starred in the movie FM (1978); her live version appears on the film's soundtrack album. Ronstadt joined the Rolling Stones onstage to sing "Tumbling Dice" on 21 July 1978 in her hometown of Tucson, Arizona.

== Personnel ==
- Lead Vocals: Linda Ronstadt
- Background Vocals: Waddy Wachtel, Kenny Edwards
- Electric Guitar: Dan Dugmore, Waddy Wachtel
- Acoustic Guitar: Dan Dugmore, Waddy Wachtel
- Slide Guitar: Waddy Wachtel
- Bass Guitar: Kenny Edwards
- Drums: Rick Marotta
- Piano: Don Grolnick
- Recorder: Val Garay
- Mixer: Val Garay
- Assistant Engineer: Mark Howlett.

In 2001, Hilary Rosen, representing the Recording Industry Association of America, testified before the US Senate Committee on Governmental Affairs and listed a number of songs that would be in danger of censorship if Senator Joe Lieberman's Media Marketing Accountability Act was to be enacted. Among those were Linda Ronstadt's cover of "Tumbling Dice", which Rosen described as "a song about rape written by Mick Jagger and Keith Richards".

Chart history

Chart (1978)	Peak position
Canada RPM Adult Contemporary	22
US Billboard Hot 100	32
US Easy Listening (Billboard)	30
US Cash Box Top 100	40

The single's B-side, "I Never Will Marry", charted concurrently on the country charts of both the US (number 8) and Canada (number 16), and reached number 30 and 39 on the corresponding Adult Contemporary charts.

=== Other versions ===
The band Pussy Galore covered all of Exile on Main St. on their album of the same name. Writing for the Los Angeles Times, music critic Randall Roberts referred to the quality of their version as if "it was recorded in the tank of a Lower East Side toilet".

Phish covered the song, performing it as part of their 2009 Halloween show, in addition to covering the entire Exile on Main St. album.

Keith Urban performed a version on The Tonight Show Starring Jimmy Fallon in May 2010. Urban's version was called a "surprisingly hard-rocking rendition" of the song by Rolling Stone. For the performance, he recruited long-time Rolling Stones' keyboardist Chuck Leavell in an effort to add "some authenticity to his version".

== Sources ==
- Babiuk, Andy; Prevost, Greg (2013). Rolling Stones Gear: All the Stones' Instruments from Stage to Studio. Milwaukee: Backbeat Books. ISBN 978-1-61713-092-2.
- Janovitz, Bill (2013). Rocks Off: 50 Tracks That Tell the Story of the Rolling Stones (First U.S. ed.). New York: St. Martin's Press. ISBN 978-1-250-02631-6. OCLC 811597730.
- Margotin, Philippe; Guesdon, Jean-Michel (25 October 2016). The Rolling Stones All the Songs: The Story Behind Every Track. New York: Running Press. ISBN 978-0-316-31773-3. Archived from the original on 6 January 2021.
- Wyman, Bill (2002). Rolling with the Stones. London: Dorling Kindersley. ISBN 978-0-7513-4646-6.
- Perry, John (1999). Exile on Main Street – The Rolling Stones. New York: Schermer Books. pp. 67–68. ISBN 978-0-8256-7180-7.
- Karnbach, James; Bernson, Carol. (1997). It's Only Rock 'n' Roll: The Ultimate Guide to the Rolling Stones. New York: Facts on File. ISBN 978-0-8160-3547-2. OCLC 36215019.
- Elliott, Martin (2012). The Rolling Stones Complete Recording Sessions 1962–2012. London: Cherry Red Books. ISBN 978-1-901447-77-4.
- Patell, Cyrus R. K. (9 June 2011). The Rolling Stones' Some Girls. New York: Bloomsbury Publishing USA. ISBN 978-1-4411-9913-3. Archived from the original on 30 August 2021.
