= Promotone BV =

Dutch company owning Rolling Stones recordings

Promotone BV is a company of the English rock band The Rolling Stones which owns their recordings. It is one of a group of Stones-related companies based in the Netherlands for tax purposes.

Promotone's headquarters is in Amsterdam. The company's activities are officially categorized as environmental services, culture, recreation and other services.
