= List of Rolling Stones band members =

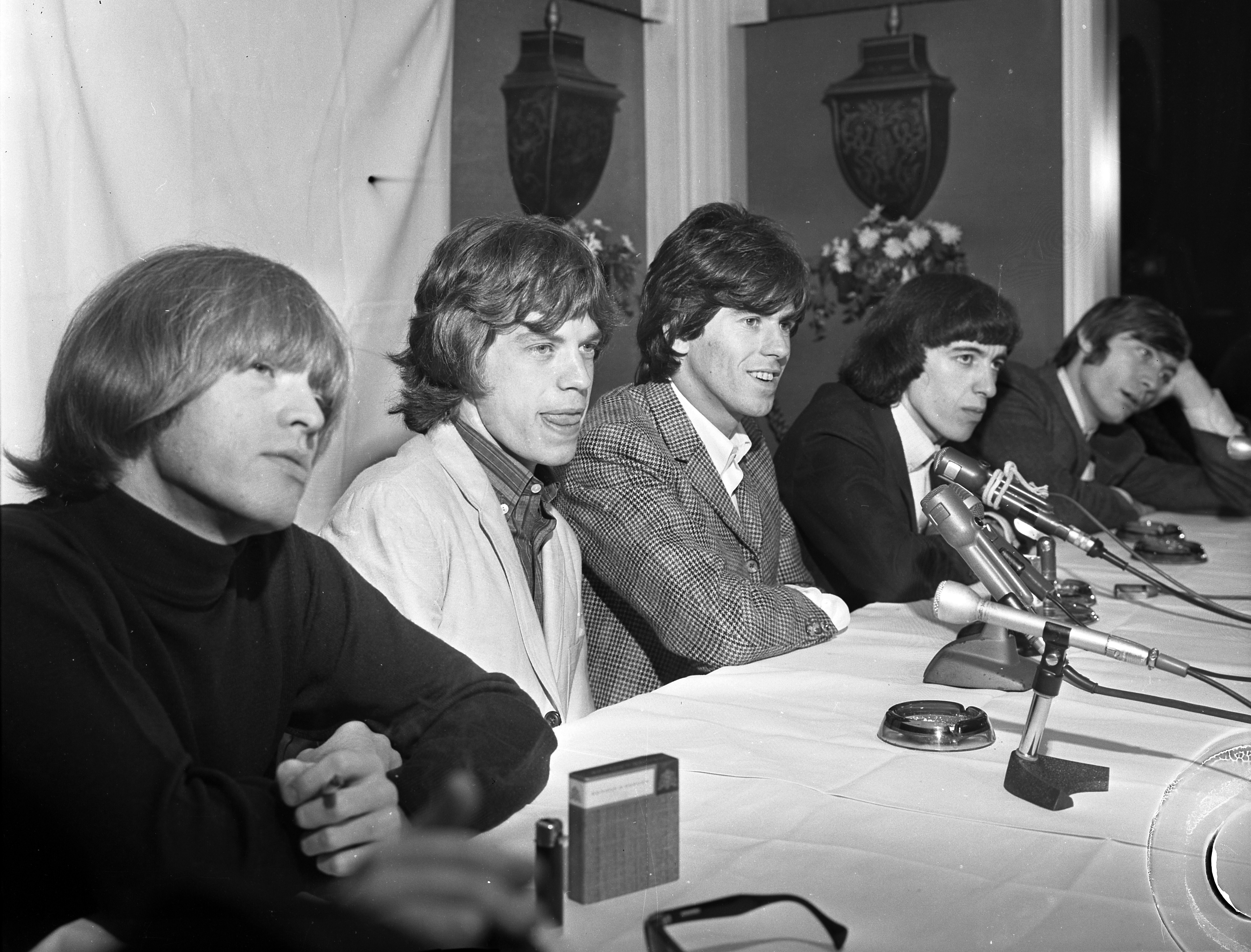
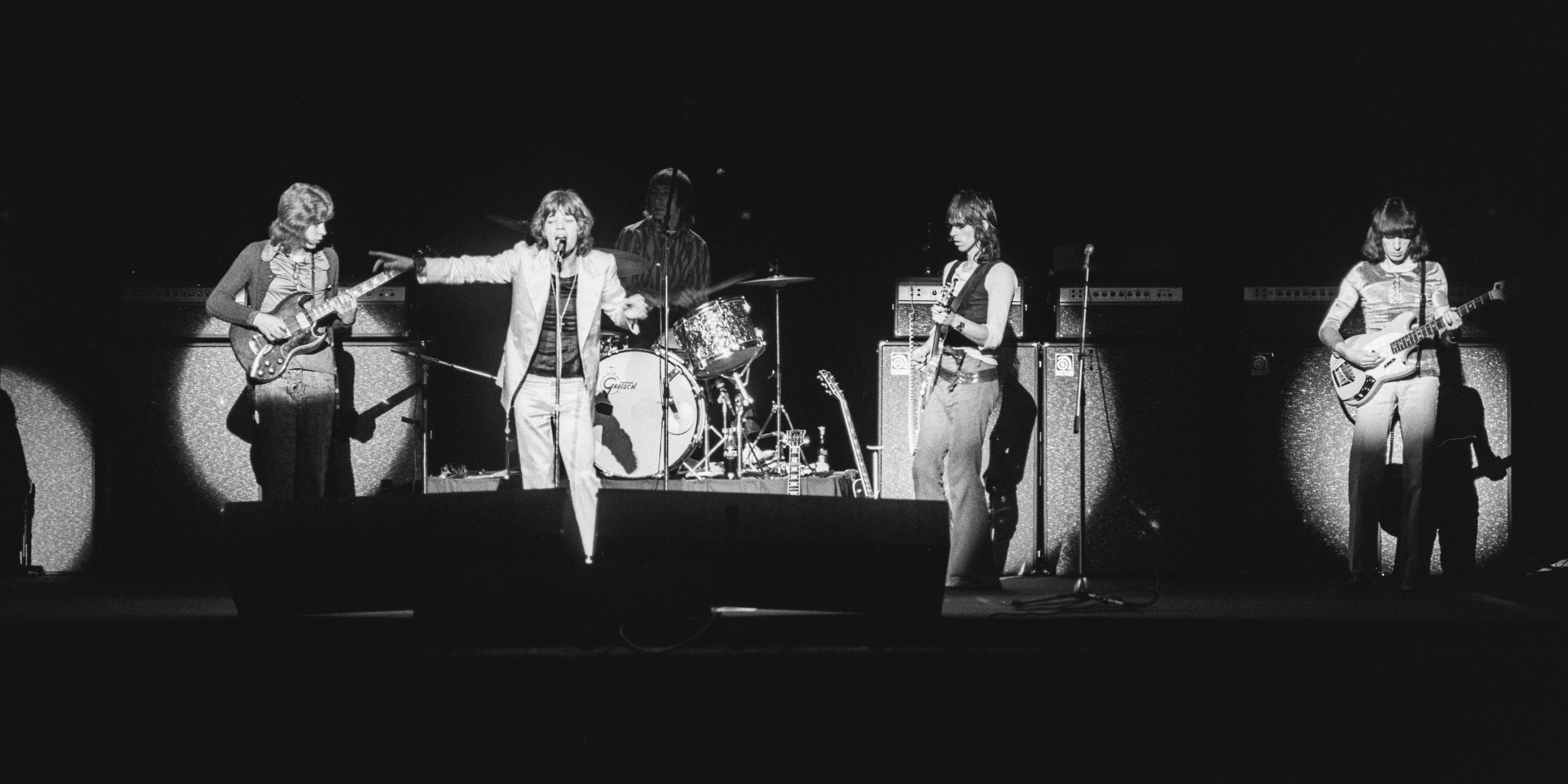
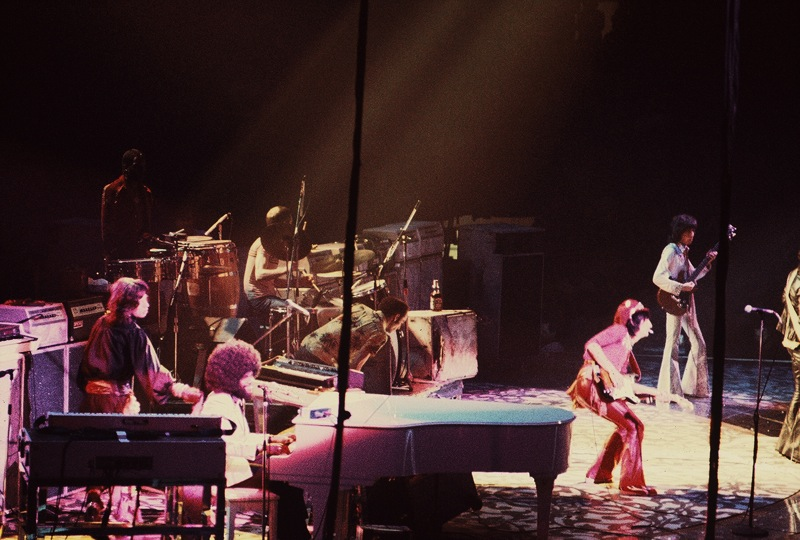
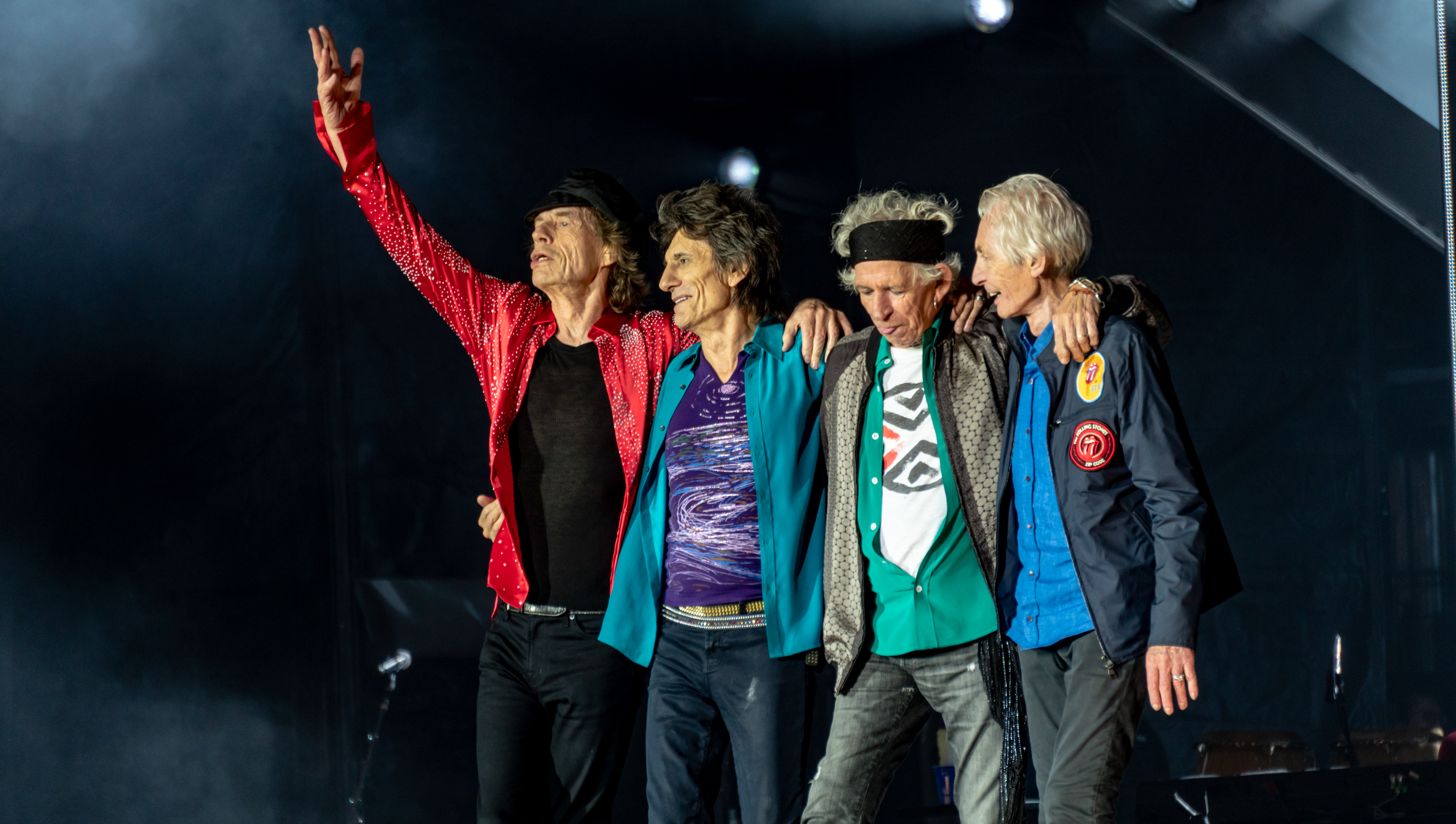
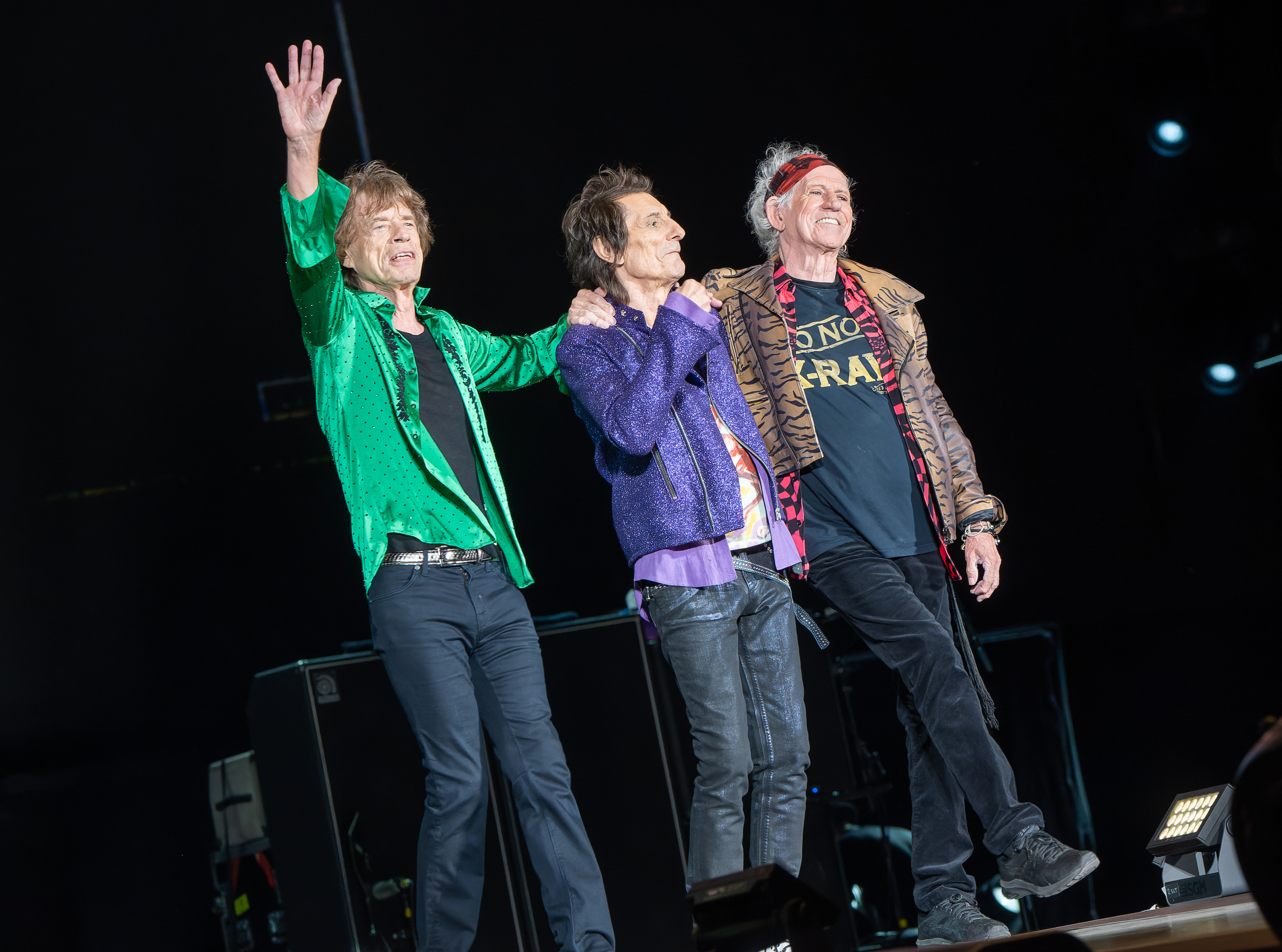
All five recording line-ups of the Rolling Stones in 1965, 1970, 1975, 2018 and 2022

The Rolling Stones are an English rock band formed in London in 1962. Their first stable line-up included vocalist Mick Jagger, guitarist and vocalist Keith Richards, multi-instrumentalist Brian Jones, bassist Bill Wyman and drummer Charlie Watts. The band currently consists of Jagger and Richards alongside guitarist Ronnie Wood (since 1975), and touring members keyboardist Chuck Leavell (since 1982), backing vocalist Bernard Fowler (since 1989), keyboardist Matt Clifford (who first joined in 1989), bassist Darryl Jones (since 1994), saxophonists Tim Ries (since 1999) and Karl Denson (since 2014), drummer Steve Jordan (since 2021) and female vocalist Chanel Haynes (since 2022).

== History ==
Jagger and Richards first met when they became classmates in 1950 at Dartford, Kent. When Jagger's family moved to Wilmington, Kent in 1954, Jagger formed a garage band with his friend Dick Taylor, who would later be an early bassist for the band. Jagger next met Richards on 17 October 1961 on platform two of Dartford railway station, when they realised they had a shared musical interest, they formed a musical partnership. Richards and Taylor often met Jagger at his house. The meetings moved to Taylor's house in late 1961, where Alan Etherington and Bob Beckwith joined the trio; the quintet called themselves the Blues Boys. The Blues Boys sent a tape of their best recordings to Alexis Korner, who was impressed. On 7 April, they visited the Ealing Jazz Club, where they met the members of Blues Incorporated, who included slide guitarist Brian Jones, keyboardist Ian Stewart, and drummer Charlie Watts. After a meeting with Korner, Jagger and Richards started jamming with the group.

Having left Blues Incorporated, Jones advertised for bandmates in Jazz Weekly in the week of 2 May 1962. Ian Stewart was among the first to respond to the ad. In June, Jagger, Taylor, and Richards left Blues Incorporated to join Jones and Stewart. That same month, the addition of the drummer Tony Chapman, replacing temporary drummer Mick Avory. completed the line-up of Jagger (vocals), Richards (guitar), Jones (guitar), Stewart (piano), and Taylor (bass).

The band played their first show billed as "the Rollin' Stones" on 12 July 1962, at the Marquee Club in London. At the time, the band consisted of Jones, Jagger, Richards, Stewart, and Taylor. Bill Wyman auditioned for the role of bass guitarist at a pub in Chelsea on 7 December 1962 and was hired as a successor to Dick Taylor, after Colin Golding and Ricky Fenson had stints with the band. Chapman, who had brought Wyman into the band, left the line-up and was replaced by Carlo Little before Charlie Watts completed the classic line-up of the Rolling Stones, who played for the first time in public on Saturday, 12 January 1963, at the Ealing Jazz Club. However, it was not until a gig there on 2 February 1963 that Watts became the Stones' permanent drummer.

In May 1963, the Rolling Stones signed Andrew Loog Oldham as their manager. Stewart left the official line-up, due to not matching the band's image, "being too old" and six being too many members. Stewart remained the road manager and touring keyboardist. This line-up remained stable until June 1969, when Jones was fired due to his heavy drug use which limited his contributions in the studio and made him unable to obtain a US visa for touring, On 3 July 1969, less than a month later, Jones drowned under mysterious circumstances in the swimming pool at his home, Cotchford Farm, in Hartfield, East Sussex. The band auditioned several guitarists, including Paul Kossoff, as a replacement for Jones, before settling on Mick Taylor, who was recommended to Jagger by John Mayall.

The Rolling Stones were scheduled to play at a free concert for Blackhill Enterprises in London's Hyde Park, two days after Jones' death; they decided to go ahead with the show as a tribute to him. This was Taylor's first live performance with the band. Taylor's first album with the band was Let It Bleed in late 1969, with posthumous contributions from Jones.

For the band's 1970 European Tour, they were joined by Bobby Keys on saxophone and Jim Price on trumpet and trombone. For their 1971 UK tour they were joined by pianist Nicky Hopkins, who took over duties from Stewart temporarily, though he later returned for the bands 1972 American tour, playing on select songs. After the band's Pacific tour 1973, Price and Hopkins departed the touring band. For the European tour, the band was joined by Steve Madaio on trumpet and flugelhorn, Billy Preston on keyboards and vocals, Trevor Lawrence on saxophone. Manuel Kellough (percussion) and Marshall Chess (trumpet) also joined the band for certain dates. Keys departed on 30 September 1973, to clean up from drink and drugs. This tour was also the last for Taylor before he quit at the end of 1974, due to him not feeling like he fit in.

The band auditioned several guitarists to replace Taylor, including Peter Frampton, Jeff Beck, Steve Marriott, Robert A. Johnson, Shuggie Otis and Rory Gallagher. Black and Blue session contributors Wayne Perkins and Harvey Mandel also auditioned but were not successful. The band later settled on Ronnie Wood. For the band's Tour of the Americas '75, they were joined by the returning Preston and Stewart alongside percussionist Ollie E. Brown, These musicians also joined the band for their Tour of Europe '76.

For the band's US Tour 1978, they were joined by Stewart and Ian McLagan (who had played with Wood in Faces). These two musicians stayed for the band's American Tour 1981, alongside saxophonist Lee Allen who was replaced by Ernie Watts and the returning Bobby Keys. McLagan was replaced by Chuck Leavell for the European Tour 1982, as well as second saxophonist Gene Barge, It was also the last tour for Ian Stewart who died in December 1985.

The band did not tour again until 1989, when they embarked on the Steel Wheels/Urban Jungle Tour, which ran until 1990. The tour included an extended touring band with Leavell and Keys returning, and new members second keyboardist Matt Clifford, backing vocalist Bernard Fowler and the Uptown Horns (Arno Hecht (saxophone), Bob Funk (trombone), Crispin Ciole (saxophone) and Paul Litteral (trumpet). For the North America and Japanese legs; they were joined by backing vocalists Lisa Fischer, Cindy Mizelle and Pamela Quinlan, and Lorelei McBroom and Sophia Jones for the European tour. This tour was their last with Wyman who left the band in January 1993. Wyman was not officially replaced.

For the band's Bridges to Babylon Tour in 1997, the tour band included the returning Leavell, Keys, Fowler, and Fischer, as well as new members Darryl Jones (bass), Andy Snitzer (saxophone, keyboards), Michael Davis (trombone), Kent Smith (trumpet) and Blondie Chaplin (backing vocals, percussion, guitar). The same musicians, except Snitzer who was replaced by Tim Ries, played on all tours from the No Security Tour in 1999, to the A Bigger Bang Tour from 2005 to 2007. Following the end of the tour in 2007, Chaplin departed. The band did not tour again until 2012, with Matt Clifford rejoining. The tour also included many guests, including former members Bill Wyman and Mick Taylor. Taylor continued to make appearances on the 14 On Fire in 2014, it was also the last tour of Bobby Keys who was replaced by Karl Denson for dates in October and November before Keys' death in December. Fischer departed after the Zip Code tour in 2015, and was replaced by Sasha Allen.

In 2017, the band embarked on the No Filter Tour with the same touring band; this tour continued until 2019, after which shows in 2020 were postponed due to the coronavirus pandemic. Dates were rescheduled to September 2021, and were the first since 1963, without Charlie Watts who had to undergo a medical procedure and died before the final leg of the tour. The band confirmed on 26 August that the tour would continue as planned, with Steve Jordan taking his place in the line-up for the remainder of the tour.

Jordan continued to drum with the band for the Sixty Tour, which included the same band, with Sasha Allen being replaced by Chanel Haynes on 21 June 2022.

== Members ==
=== Current members ===
Image	Name	Years active	Instruments	Release contributions
	Mick Jagger	1962–present	lead and backing vocals; harmonica; rhythm guitar; percussion; keyboards; bass guitar; slide guitar; vibraphone	all releases
	Keith Richards	1962–present	lead, rhythm and slide guitars; bass guitar; backing and lead vocals; keyboards; percussion; double bass	all releases
	Ronnie Wood	1975–present	lead, rhythm and slide guitars; bass guitar; backing vocals; pedal steel guitar; drums; saxophone; piano; electric sitar	all releases from Black and Blue (1976) onwards, except The Rolling Stones Rock and Roll Circus (1996), Brussels Affair (Live 1973) (2011), Ladies and Gentlemen: The Rolling Stones (2017), On Air (2017)

=== Former members ===
Image	Name	Years active	Instruments	Release contributions
	Brian Jones	1962–1969 (died 1969)	rhythm, lead and slide guitars; harmonica; keyboards; sitar; Appalachian dulcimer; marimbas; koto; recorder; saxophone; flute; harp; autoharp; mandolin; tanpura; percussion; backing vocals; bass guitar	all releases from The Rolling Stones / England's Newest Hit Makers (1964) to Let It Bleed (1969); The Rolling Stones Rock and Roll Circus (1996); On Air (2017)
	Ian Stewart	1962–1963 (touring/session musician and road manager 1963–1985; his death)	piano; organ; percussion	all releases from The Rolling Stones / England's Newest Hit Makers (1964) to Dirty Work (1986), except Their Satanic Majesties Request (1967), Beggars Banquet (1968) and Some Girls (1978); Some Girls (1978) 2011 bonus tracks; Ladies and Gentlemen: The Rolling Stones (2017); On Air (2017); El Mocambo 1977 (2022)
	Bill Wyman	1962–1993 (guest 2012, 2023)	bass guitar; keyboards; piano; percussion; backing and occasional lead vocals; double bass; rhythm guitar; marimba; vibraphone; autoharp	all releases from The Rolling Stones / England's Newest Hit Makers (1964) to Flashpoint (1991); The Rolling Stones Rock and Roll Circus (1996); Brussels Affair (2011); Ladies and Gentlemen: The Rolling Stones (2017); On Air (2017); El Mocambo 1977 (2022); Hackney Diamonds (2023) one track
	Charlie Watts	1963–2021 (until his death)	drums; percussion; occasional backing vocals; bass guitar; marimba	all releases to date
	Mick Taylor	1969–1974 (guest 2012–2014)	lead, rhythm and slide guitars; bass guitar; backing vocals; synthesisers; congas	all releases from Let It Bleed (1969) to It's Only Rock 'n Roll (1974); Tattoo You (1981) two tracks recorded in 1972; Brussels Affair (2011); Hyde Park Live (2013); Ladies and Gentlemen: The Rolling Stones (2017)

=== Early members ===
Image	Name	Years active	Instruments	Notes
	Dick Taylor	1962	bass guitar; guitar	Taylor was a friend of Jagger's, he played guitar in early lineups before the band joined with Jones. He left the band to continue studies at Sidcup Art College.
	Mick Avory	1962	drums	Avory rehearsed with the band in Mid 1962, but denies playing any gigs, despite Richards insisting that he played at their debut gig.
	Tony Chapman	1962	drums	Chapman is rumoured to have played with the band at their first official performance on 12 July 1962. He helped get Bill Wyman in the band, but left due to doubts over the band's blues style.
	Colin Golding	1962	bass guitar	Golding played around eight gigs with the band following the departure of Dick Taylor.
	Ricky Fenson	1962	bass guitar	Fenson also played gigs with the band before Wyman arrived.
	Carlo Little	1962–1963 (died 2005)	drums	Little played a few gigs with the band in late 1962 and early 1963.

=== Current touring musicians ===
Image	Name	Years active	Instruments	Release contributions
	Chuck Leavell	1982–present	keyboards; cowbell; backing vocals	all releases from Undercover (1983) onwards, except Bridges to Babylon (1997), Brussels Affair (2011), Ladies and Gentlemen: The Rolling Stones (2017), On Air (2017), El Mocambo 1977 (2022) and Hackney Diamonds (2023)
	Bernard Fowler	1989–present	backing vocals; percussion; occasional keyboards	all releases from Steel Wheels (1989) onwards, except Brussels Affair (Live 1973) (2011), Blue & Lonesome (2016), Ladies and Gentlemen: The Rolling Stones (2017), On Air (2017), El Mocambo 1977 (2022) and Hackney Diamonds (2023)
	Matt Clifford	1989–1990; 2012–present	keyboards; French horn; backing vocals; percussion; musical integrator	Some Girls (1978) 2011 bonus track; Steel Wheels (1989); Flashpoint (1991); A Bigger Bang (2005); Hyde Park Live (2013); Blue & Lonesome (2016); Steel Wheels Live (2020); Licked Live in NYC (2022); Foreign Tongues (2026)
	Darryl Jones	1994–present	bass guitar; backing vocals	all releases from Voodoo Lounge (1994) onwards, except Brussels Affair (Live 1973) (2011), Ladies and Gentlemen: The Rolling Stones (2017), On Air (2017), Steel Wheels Live (2020), El Mocambo 1977 (2022) and Hackney Diamonds (2023)
	Tim Ries	1999–present	saxophone; keyboards	Live Licks (2004); Shine a Light (2008); Hyde Park Live (2013); Steel Wheels Live (2020); Licked Live in NYC (2022)
	Karl Denson	2014–present	saxophone	Sticky Fingers: Live at the Fonda Theater 2015 (2017)
	Steve Jordan	2021–present	drums	Hackney Diamonds (2023); Foreign Tongues (2026)
	Chanel Haynes	2022–present	backing vocals; co-lead vocals on "Gimme Shelter"	none to date

=== Former touring musicians ===
Image	Name	Years active	Instruments	Release contributions
	Bobby Keys	1970–1973; 1975; 1981–2014 (until his death)	saxophone	Let It Bleed (1969); Sticky Fingers (1971); Exile on Main St. (1972); Goats Head Soup (1973); Emotional Rescue (1980); Flashpoint (1991); Stripped (1995); No Security (1998); Live Licks (2004); Shine a Light (2008); Hyde Park Live (2013); Licked Live in NYC (2022); Grrr Live! (2023)
	Jim Price	1970–1973 (died 2023)	trumpet; trombone	Sticky Fingers (1971); Exile on Main St. (1972); Goats Head Soup (1973)
	Nicky Hopkins	1971–1973 (died 1994)	piano	Their Satanic Majesties Request (1967); Beggars Banquet (1968); Let It Bleed (1969); Sticky Fingers (1971); Exile on Main St. (1972); Goats Head Soup (1973); It's Only Rock 'n Roll (1974); Black and Blue (1976); Tattoo You (1981)
	Billy Preston	1973–1977 (died 2006)	keyboards; vocals	Sticky Fingers (1971); Exile on Main St. (1972); Goats Head Soup (1973); It's Only Rock 'n Roll (1974); Black and Blue (1976); Love You Live (1976); Bridges to Babylon (1997); Brussels Affair (2011); L.A. Friday (Live 1975) (2012)
	Steve Madaio	1973; 1975 (died 2019)	trumpet; flugelhorn	Brussels Affair (2011)
	Trevor Lawrence	1973; 1975	saxophone	Brussels Affair (2011)
	Ollie E. Brown	1975–1976	percussion; drums; backing vocals	Black And Blue (1976); Love You Live (1977); Tattoo You (1981)
	Ian McLagan	1978–1981 (died 2014)	keyboards; backing vocals	Some Girls (1978); Still Life (1982)
	Lee Allen	1981 (died 1994)	saxophone	none
	Ernie Watts	1981	saxophone	Still Life (1982)
	Gene Barge	1982 (died 2025)	saxophone	none
	Arno Hecht	1989–1990	saxophone	Flashpoint (1991); Steel Wheels Live (2020)
	Crispin Cioe	1989–1990	saxophone	Flashpoint (1991); Steel Wheels Live (2020)
	Bob Funk	1989–1990	trombone	Flashpoint (1991); Steel Wheels Live (2020)
	Paul Litteral	1989–1990	trumpet	Flashpoint (1991); Steel Wheels Live (2020)
	Lisa Fischer	1989–1990; 1994–2015	backing vocals; co-lead vocals on "Gimme Shelter"; percussion	Steel Wheels (1989); Flashpoint (1991); Stripped (1995); No Security (1998); Live Licks (2004); Shine a Light (2008); Hyde Park Live (2013); Steel Wheels Live (2020); Licked Live in NYC (2022); Grrr Live! (2023)
	Cindy Mizelle	1989–1990	backing vocals	Flashpoint (1991); Steel Wheels Live (2020)
	Pamela Quinlan	1989; 1990	backing vocals	none
	Sophia Jones	1990	backing vocals	none
	Lorelei McBroom	1990	backing vocals	Flashpoint (1991)
	Andy Snitzer	1994–1998	saxophone; keyboards	Stripped (1995); No Security (1998)
	Michael Davis	1994–2007	trombone	Stripped (1995); No Security (1998); Shine a Light (2008)
	Kent Smith	1994–2007	trumpet	Stripped (1995); No Security (1998); Shine a Light (2008)
	Blondie Chaplin	1997–2007	backing vocals; percussion; additional guitar	Bridges to Babylon (1997); A Bigger Bang (2005); No Security (1998); Licked Live in NYC (2022)
	Sasha Allen	2016–2022	backing vocals; co-lead vocals on "Gimme Shelter"	none

== Line-ups ==
Period	Members	Releases
May – June 1962	Mick Jagger – lead vocals; Keith Richards – guitar, backing vocals; Brian Jones – guitar, harmonica, backing vocals; Ian Stewart – piano; Dick Taylor – bass guitar; Mick Avory – drums	none – rehearsals only
June – October 1962	Mick Jagger – lead vocals; Keith Richards – guitar, backing vocals; Brian Jones – guitar, harmonica, backing vocals; Ian Stewart – piano; Dick Taylor – bass guitar; Tony Chapman – drums	none – live shows only
October – December 1962	Mick Jagger – lead vocals; Keith Richards – guitar, backing vocals; Brian Jones – guitar, harmonica, backing vocals; Ian Stewart – piano; Tony Chapman – drums; Ricky Fenson or Colin Golding (alternating) – bass guitar	none – live shows only
December 1962 – January 1963	Mick Jagger – lead vocals; Keith Richards – guitar, backing vocals; Brian Jones – guitar, harmonica, backing vocals; Ian Stewart – piano; Bill Wyman – bass guitar, backing vocals; Tony Chapman – drums	none – live shows only
January 1963	Mick Jagger – lead vocals; Keith Richards – guitar, backing vocals; Brian Jones – guitar, harmonica, backing vocals; Ian Stewart – piano; Bill Wyman – bass guitar, backing vocals; Carlo Little – drums	none – live shows only
January – May 1963	Mick Jagger – lead vocals; Keith Richards – guitar, backing vocals; Brian Jones – guitar, harmonica, backing vocals; Ian Stewart – piano, keyboards, percussion; Bill Wyman – bass guitar, backing vocals; Charlie Watts – drums	none – live shows only
May 1963 – June 1969	Mick Jagger – vocals, harmonica, percussion; Keith Richards – guitar, vocals, bass guitar, keyboards; Brian Jones – guitar, harmonica, keyboards, organ, percussion, Appalachian dulcimer, sitar, koto, marimbas, recorder, flute, saxophone, harp, mandolin, autoharp, tanpura, backing vocals; Bill Wyman – bass guitar, backing and occasional lead vocals, keyboards, percussion; Charlie Watts – drums, percussion	The Rolling Stones (1964); England's Newest Hit Makers (1964); 12 X 5 (1964); The Rolling Stones No. 2 (1965); The Rolling Stones, Now! (1965); Out of Our Heads (1965); December's Children (And Everybody's) (1965); Big Hits (High Tide and Green Grass) (1966); Aftermath (1966); Got Live If You Want It! (1966); Between the Buttons (1967); Flowers (1967); Their Satanic Majesties Request (1967); Beggars Banquet (1968); Through the Past, Darkly (Big Hits Vol. 2) (1969); Let It Bleed (1969); The Rolling Stones Rock and Roll Circus (1996); Forty Licks (2002); GRRR! (2012); Live 1965: Music From Charlie Is My Darling (2015); On Air (2017)
June 1969 – December 1974	Mick Jagger – vocals, harmonica, guitar, keyboards; Keith Richards – guitar, vocals, bass guitar, keyboards; Bill Wyman – bass guitar, keyboards, percussion; Charlie Watts – drums, percussion; Mick Taylor – guitar, backing vocals, bass guitar, congas, synthesizers	Through the Past, Darkly (Big Hits Vol. 2) (1969); Let It Bleed (1969); Get Yer Ya-Ya's Out! (1970); Sticky Fingers (1971); Exile on Main St. (1972); Goats Head Soup (1973); It's Only Rock 'n Roll (1974); Forty Licks (2002); Brussels Affair (Live 1973) (2011); GRRR! (2012); The Marquee Club Live in 1971 (2015); Ladies and Gentlemen: The Rolling Stones (2017)
December 1974 – January 1993	Mick Jagger – vocals, harmonica, guitar, keyboards; Keith Richards – guitar, vocals, bass guitar; Bill Wyman – bass guitar, keyboards, percussion; Charlie Watts – drums, percussion; Ronnie Wood – guitar, bass guitar, backing vocals	Black and Blue (1976); Love You Live (1977); Some Girls (1978); Emotional Rescue (1980); Tattoo You (1981); Still Life (1982); Undercover (1983); Dirty Work (1986); Steel Wheels (1989); Flashpoint (1991); Forty Licks (2002); Some Girls: Live in Texas '78 (2011); Hampton Coliseum (Live 1981) (2012); L.A. Friday (Live 1975) (2012); Live at the Tokyo Dome (Live 1990) (2012); Live at Leeds (Live 1982) (2012); GRRR! (2012); El Mocambo 1977 (2017); Steel Wheels Live (2020)
January 1993 – August 2021	Mick Jagger – vocals, harmonica, guitar, keyboards; Keith Richards – guitar, vocals, bass guitar, piano; Ronnie Wood – guitar, backing vocals; Charlie Watts – drums, percussion	Voodoo Lounge (1994); Stripped (1995); Bridges to Babylon (1997); No Security (1998); Forty Licks (2002); Live Licks (2004); A Bigger Bang (2005); Shine a Light (2008); Light the Fuse (Live 2005) (2012); GRRR! (2012); Sweet Summer Sun (2013); Sticky Fingers Live at Fonda Theatre (2015); Totally Stripped (2016); Blue & Lonesome (2016); Havana Moon (2016); No Security. San Jose '99 (2018); Voodoo Lounge Uncut (2018); Bridges to Bremen (2019); Bridges to Buenos Aires (2019); A Bigger Bang: Live on Copacabana Beach (2021); Licked Live in NYC (2022); Grrr Live! (2023); Hackney Diamonds (2023)
August 2021 – present	Mick Jagger – vocals, harmonica, guitar, keyboards, tambourine; Keith Richards – guitar, vocals, bass guitar, piano; Ronnie Wood – guitar, backing vocals	Hackney Diamonds (2023); Foreign Tongues (2026)

== Sources ==
- Bockris, Victor (1992). Keith Richards: The Biography. Poseidon Press. ISBN 978-0-671-70061-4.
- Booth, Stanley (2000). The True Adventures of the Rolling Stones. Chicago Review Press. ISBN 978-1-56976-579-1.
- Cohen, Rich (2016). The Sun & the Moon & the Rolling Stones. Random House. ISBN 978-0-804-17923-2.
- Coral, Gus; Hinckley, David; Rodman, Debra (1995). The Rolling Stones: Black & White Blues. Turner Publishing. ISBN 978-1-57036-150-0.
- Davis, Stephen (2001). Old Gods Almost Dead: The 40-Year Odyssey of the Rolling Stones. Broadway Books. ISBN 978-0-7679-0312-7.
- Egan, Sean (2013). The Mammoth Book of The Rolling Stones. Robinson. ISBN 978-1-78033-646-6.
- Gilliland, John (1969). "The British Are Coming! The British Are Coming!: The U.S.A. is invaded by a wave of long-haired English rockers" (audio). Pop Chronicles. University of North Texas Libraries.
- Greenfield, Robert (1981). The Rolling Stone Interviews: Keith Richards. St. Martin's Press/Rolling Stone Press. ISBN 978-0-312-68954-4.
- Greenspan, Edward, ed. (1980). "Regina v. Richards 49 C.C.C. (2d)". Canadian Criminal Cases. Canada Law Book.
- Haslam, Dave (2015). Life After Dark: A History of British Nightclubs & Music Venues. Simon and Schuster. ISBN 978-0-857-20700-5.
- Jagger, Mick; Richards, Keith; Watts, Charlie; Wood, Ronnie (2003). Loewenstein, Dora; Dodd, Philip (eds.). According to the Rolling Stones. Chronicle Books. ISBN 978-0-8118-4060-6. OCLC 53051557.
- Margotin, Philippe; Guesdon, Jean-Michel (25 October 2016). The Rolling Stones All the Songs: The Story Behind Every Track. Running Press. ISBN 978-0-316-31773-3.
- Marshall, Jim (2012). The Rolling Stones 1972. Chronicle Books. ISBN 978-1-4521-2180-2.
- McLagan, Ian (2000). All the Rage: A Riotous Romp Through Rock and Roll History. St. Martin's Press. ISBN 978-0-8230-7842-4.
- Moon, Tom (2004). "The Rolling Stones". In Brackett, Nathan; Hoard, Christian (eds.). The New Rolling Stone Album Guide. Fireside. pp. 695–699. ISBN 978-0-7432-0169-8.
  Portions posted at "The Rolling Stones Album Guide". Rolling Stone. Archived from the original on 12 April 2011.
- Nathan, David; Lindsay, Susan Gedutis (2001). Inside the Hits. Berklee Press. p. 217.
- Neill, Andy (2015). Keith Richards: A Life in Pictures. Omnibus Press. ISBN 978-0-857-12873-7.
- Nelson, Murray N. (2010). The Rolling Stones: A Musical Biography. Greenwood. ISBN 978-0-313-38034-1.
- Norman, Philip (2001). The Stones. Sidgwick & Jackson. ISBN 978-0-283-07277-2.
- Oldham, Andrew Loog (2000). Stoned. St. Martin's Griffin. ISBN 978-0-312-27094-0.
- Patell, Cyrus R.K. (2011). Rolling Stones' Some Girls. A&C Black. p. 24.
- Paytress, Mark (2003). Rolling Stones: Off the Record. Omnibus. ISBN 978-0-7119-8869-9.
- Perone, James (2012). The Album: A Guide to Pop Music's Most Provocative, Influential, and Important Creations. ABC-CLIO. ISBN 978-0-313-37906-2.
- Richards, Keith; Fox, James (2010). Life (1st ed.). Little, Brown and Company. ISBN 978-0-297-85439-5. OCLC 548642133.
- Sandford, Christopher (1999). Mick Jagger: Primitive Cool. Cooper Square Press. ISBN 978-0-8154-1002-7.
- Sandford, Christopher (2003). Keith Richards: Satisfaction. Caroll & Graf. ISBN 978-0-7867-1368-4.
- Schinder, Scott; Schwartz, Andy (2010). Icons of Rock: An Encyclopedia of the Legends Who Changed Music Forever. ABC-CLIO. p. 230.
- Szatmary, David P. (2014). Rockin' in Time (8th ed.). Pearson.
- Wells, Simon (2012). The Great Rolling Stones Drug Bust. Omnibus Press. ISBN 978-0-857-12711-2.
- Wyman, Bill (1990). Bill Wyman, Stone Alone: The Story of a Rock 'n' Roll Band. Viking. ISBN 978-0-670-82894-4.
- Wyman, Bill (2002). Rolling with the Stones. DK Publishing. ISBN 978-0-7894-8967-8.
