= Memory Motel =

Song by The Rolling Stones

from the album Black and Blue
- Released: 23 April 1976
- Recorded: March – April, October – December 1975
- Genre: Rock; soul
- Length: 7:07
- Label: Rolling Stones/Virgin
- Songwriter: Jagger/Richards
- Producer: The Glimmer Twins

Black and Blue track listing
- 8 tracks Side one: 1. "Hot Stuff"; 2. "Hand of Fate"; 3. "Cherry Oh Baby"; 4. "Memory Motel"; Side two: 5. "Hey Negrita"; 6. "Melody"; 7. "Fool to Cry"; 8. "Crazy Mama"

"Memory Motel" is a ballad song from English rock band the Rolling Stones' 1976 album Black and Blue. The song is credited to singer Mick Jagger and guitarist Keith Richards (named Richard at the time). It is one of the few which feature both members sharing lead vocals. The song is more than seven minutes long, one of the longest by the Rolling Stones.

== Overview ==
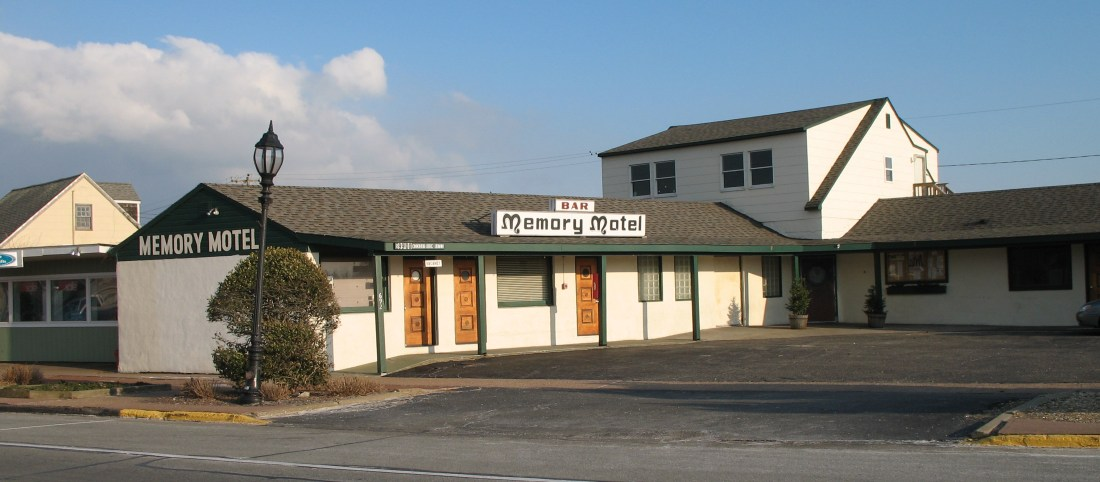
Memory Motel in Montauk that was said to be the inspiration for the song.

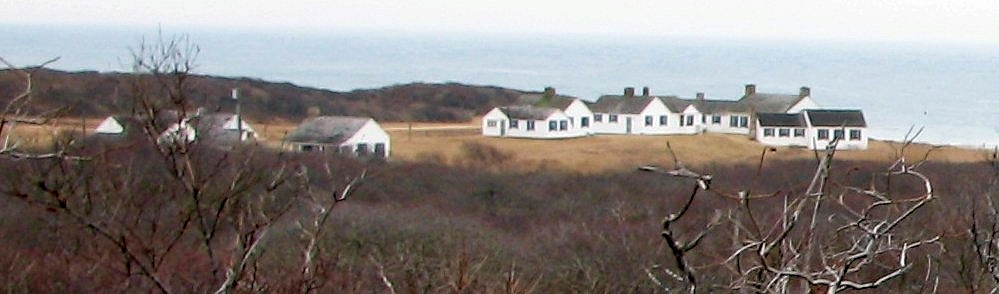
Andy Warhol's Eothen complex in Montauk where the Stones were staying.

Jagger began writing the song before beginning the Stones' Tour of the Americas '75 while staying with Richards at Eothen, Andy Warhol estate in Montauk, New York, and finished it while on tour. This is reflected in the song's lyrics where Jagger describes having to leave for Baton Rouge, where the Stones played two warm up shows at Louisiana State University, and where he describes subsequent experiences on the road.

The title comes from an actual motel in Montauk, on Long Island. The lyrics to the song have long drawn speculation as to who the "Hannah baby" in the lyrics refer to. Carly Simon is often a name considered, due to Jagger's descriptions of the woman throughout the song; photographer Annie Leibovitz has also been considered as a possible subject.

Richards did not play guitar on the track, but contributed co-lead vocals alongside Jagger; Black and Blue has long been known as the album used to find a replacement for lead guitarist Mick Taylor, who left right before work was to begin on it. Harvey Mandel plays electric guitar while Wayne Perkins performs acoustic. Jagger, Richards, and Billy Preston play acoustic piano, electric piano, and an ARP String Ensemble on the song, respectively. Preston also contributes backing vocals along with Ron Wood, who would eventually become the Stones' rhythm guitarist. The song was recorded in Munich, Germany at Musicland Studios in March and April 1975. Overdubs and re-recordings were performed later in the year.

A live version appeared on the Stones' 1998 live album No Security, where Dave Matthews took up lead vocals with Jagger and Richards. For an episode of the 1990 TV music show Beyond The Groove by Jagger collaborator David A. Stewart, Jagger recorded a version of "Memory Motel" without Richards.

== Personnel ==
According to the authors Philippe Margotin and Jean-Michel Guesdon:

The Rolling Stones

- Mick Jagger – lead vocals, piano
- Keith Richards – electric piano, backing vocals
- Ronnie Wood – backing vocals
- Bill Wyman – bass guitar
- Charlie Watts – drums

Additional personnel

- Billy Preston – synthesiser, backing vocals
- Harvey Mandel – lead guitar
- Wayne Perkins – acoustic guitar

Technical

- Producers – The Glimmer Twins
- Engineers – Keith Harwood, Glyn Johns, Phil McDonald, Lew Hahn
- Assistant engineers – Jeremy Gee, Dave Richards, Tapani Tapanainen, Steve Dowd, Gene Paul, Lee Hulko
