= The Rolling Stones Tour of Europe '76 =

1976 concert tour by the Rolling Stones

- Tour by The Rolling Stones
- Location: Europe • North America
- Associated album: Black and Blue
- Start date: 28 April 1976
- End date: 23 June 1976
- Legs: 1
- No. of shows: 41

The Rolling Stones concert chronology
- Tour of the Americas '75; Tour of Europe '76; US Tour 1978

The Rolling Stones' Tour of Europe '76 was a concert tour of Europe that took place in Spring 1976.

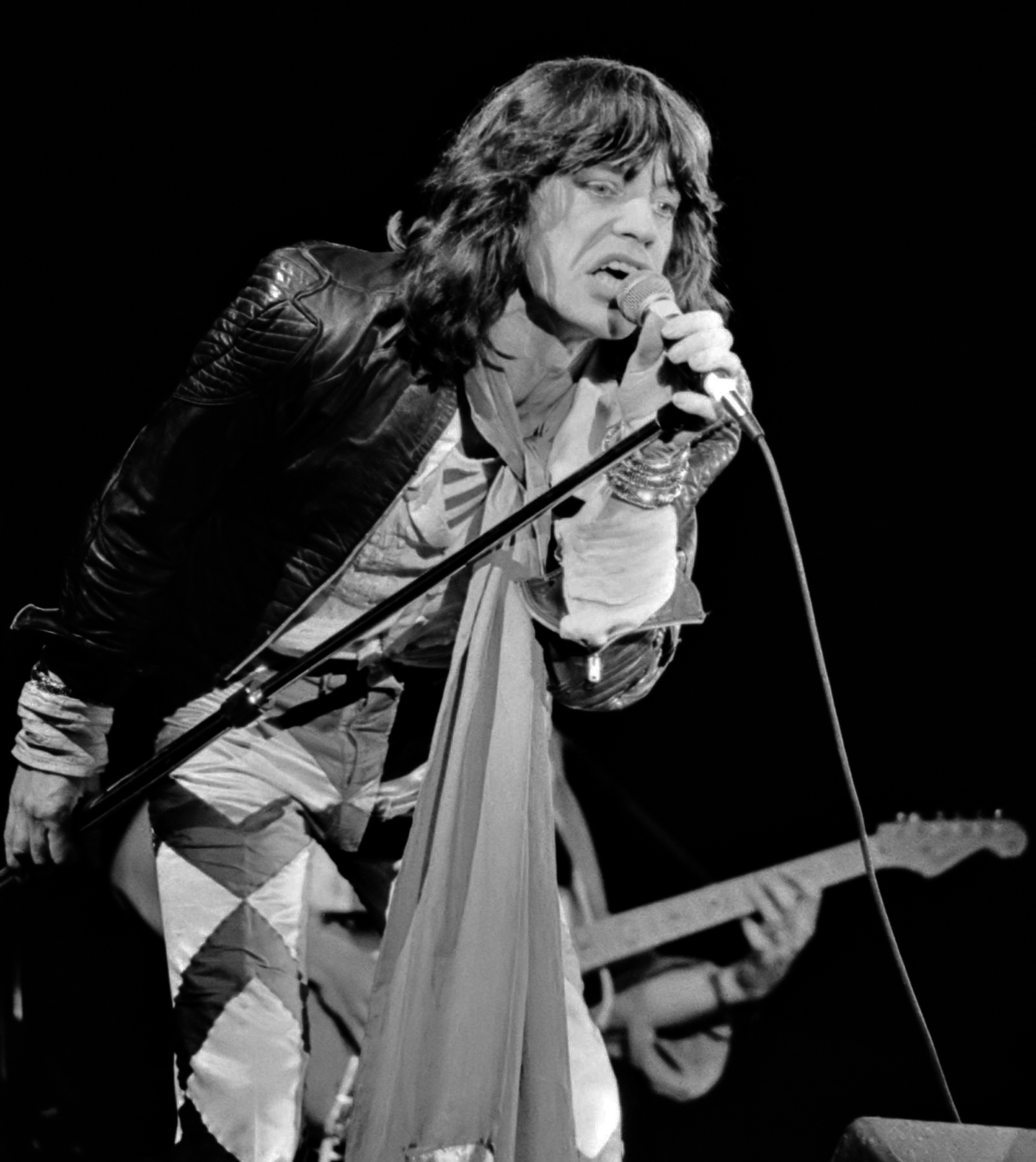
Mick Jagger during the concert in Den Haag

== History ==
Tickets were in high demand; on 1 April the promoters announced that they had received more than one million applications in the mail for tickets for three shows at London's Earls Court Exhibition Centre; subsequently three more dates were added there. The routing also saw two dates in Yugoslavia – the Stones' second visit to a Communist country after 1967.

The tour began a few days after the 23 April release of the group's album Black and Blue, and is documented by the 1977 concert release Love You Live. Most of the material on that album is from the shows at Les Abattoirs in Paris from 5 to 7 June. Keith Richards' 10-week-old son Tara died of sudden infant death syndrome on 6 June, but Richards elected to keep the news secret and to play the shows as scheduled.

== Personnel ==
=== The Rolling Stones ===
- Mick Jagger – lead vocals, harmonica, keyboards
- Keith Richards – guitar, vocals
- Bill Wyman – bass
- Charlie Watts – drums, percussion
- Ronnie Wood – guitar, vocals

=== Additional musicians ===
- Billy Preston – keyboards, vocals
- Ollie Brown – percussion, drums
- Ian Stewart – piano

=== Guest musicians ===
Leicester, England, Granby Hall, May 15, 1976:

- Eric Clapton – guitar and lead vocals on "Key to the Highway", guitar on "Jumpin' Jack Flash", and "Street Fighting Man".

== Typical tour set list ==
(Songs credited to Jagger/Richards unless otherwise noted)

1. "Honky Tonk Women"
2. "If You Can't Rock Me"/"Get off of My Cloud"
3. "Hand of Fate"
4. "Hey Negrita"
5. "Ain't Too Proud to Beg" (Norman Whitfield, Eddie Holland)
6. "Fool to Cry"
7. "Hot Stuff"
8. "Star Star"
9. "Angie" – [played some shows]
10. "You Gotta Move" (Traditional)
11. "You Can't Always Get What You Want"
12. "Happy"
13. "Tumbling Dice"
14. "Nothing from Nothing" (sung by Billy Preston) (Billy Preston, Bruce Fisher)
15. "Outa-Space" (led by Billy Preston) (Billy Preston, Joe Greene)
16. "Midnight Rambler"
17. "It's Only Rock 'n Roll (But I Like It)"
18. "Brown Sugar"
19. "Jumpin' Jack Flash"
20. "Street Fighting Man"

"All Down the Line" was played at the Frankfurt Festhalle. "Sympathy for the Devil" was played at Earls Court Exhibition Centre on 21–23 & 27 May. "Cherry Oh Baby" was played in Paris on 7 June.

The Rolling Stones also appeared at Knebworth Fair in August 1976, where they added "(I Can't Get No) Satisfaction", "Around and Around", "Little Red Rooster", "Stray Cat Blues", "Let's Spend the Night Together", "Dead Flowers", "Route 66", a fragment of "Country Honk," "Wild Horses," and "Rip This Joint" to the above set list.

The Rolling Stones also appeared at two club dates in 1977 at El Mocambo, Toronto, Canada. Like the Knebworth show these were not part of the 1976 tour.

== Tour dates ==
Date	City	Country	Venue
28 April 1976	Frankfurt	West Germany	Festhalle
29 April 1976	Frankfurt	West Germany	Festhalle
30 April 1976; 2 shows	Münster	West Germany	Halle Münsterland
2 May 1976	Kiel	West Germany	Ostseehalle
3 May 1976	West Berlin	West Germany	Deutschlandhalle
4 May 1976	Bremen	West Germany	Stadthalle
6 May 1976	Brussels	Belgium	Forest National
7 May 1976	Brussels	Belgium	Forest National
10 May 1976	Glasgow	Scotland	Apollo Theatre
11 May 1976	Glasgow	Scotland	Apollo Theatre
12 May 1976	Glasgow	Scotland	Apollo Theatre
14 May 1976	Leicester	England	Granby Halls
15 May 1976	Leicester	England	Granby Halls
17 May 1976	Stafford	England	Bingley Hall
18 May 1976	Stafford	England	Bingley Hall
21 May 1976	London	England	Earls Court Exhibition Centre
22 May 1976	London	England	Earls Court Exhibition Centre
23 May 1976	London	England	Earls Court Exhibition Centre
25 May 1976	London	England	Earls Court Exhibition Centre
26 May 1976	London	England	Earls Court Exhibition Centre
27 May 1976	London	England	Earls Court Exhibition Centre
29 May 1976	The Hague	Netherlands	Zuiderpark Stadion
30 May 1976	The Hague	Netherlands	Zuiderpark Stadion
1 June 1976	Dortmund	West Germany	Westfalenhalle
2 June 1976; 2 shows	Cologne	West Germany	Sporthalle
4 June 1976	Paris	France	Pavillon de Paris (Les Abattoirs)
5 June 1976	Paris	France	Pavillon de Paris (Les Abattoirs)
6 June 1976	Paris	France	Pavillon de Paris (Les Abattoirs)
7 June 1976	Paris	France	Pavillon de Paris (Les Abattoirs)
9 June 1976	Lyon	France	Palais des Sports de Gerland
11 June 1976	Barcelona	Spain	Plaza de toros Monumental
13 June 1976	Nice	France	France Parc Des Sports De L’Ouest
15 June 1976	Zürich	Switzerland	Hallenstadion
16 June 1976	Munich	West Germany	Olympiahalle
17 June 1976	Munich	West Germany	Olympiahalle
19 June 1976	Stuttgart	West Germany	Neckarstadion
21 June 1976	Zagreb	Yugoslavia	Dom Sportova
22 June 1976	Zagreb	Yugoslavia	Dom Sportova
23 June 1976	Vienna	Austria	Stadthalle
Knebworth Fair
21 August 1976	Knebworth	England	Knebworth Fair; This concert was not technically part of the tour.
1977 Dates
4 March 1977	Toronto	Canada	El Mocambo
5 March 1977	Toronto	Canada	El Mocambo
