= Hey Negrita (song) =

Song by the Rolling Stones

from the album Black and Blue
- Released: 23 April 1976
- Recorded: March – April, October – December 1975
- Genre: Reggae rock
- Length: 4:58
- Label: Rolling Stones/Virgin
- Songwriter: Jagger/Richards (inspiration by Ron Wood)
- Producer: The Glimmer Twins

Black and Blue track listing
- 8 tracks Side one: 1. "Hot Stuff"; 2. "Hand of Fate"; 3. "Cherry Oh Baby"; 4. "Memory Motel"; Side two: 5. "Hey Negrita"; 6. "Melody"; 7. "Fool to Cry"; 8. "Crazy Mama"

"Hey Negrita" is a song by English rock band the Rolling Stones that appeared on their 1976 album Black and Blue.

Credited to Mick Jagger and Keith Richards, Ron Wood apparently wrote the song's main riff, a piece of music he took with him to Munich's Musicland Studios where he and other guitarists were auditioning for the second guitarist slot left open after the departure of Mick Taylor. For his contribution, Wood would receive an "inspiration by" credit on the album. In 2003, Wood recounted, "All of us, independently and together, were into reggae, and it was also a mood of the time. I had this particular lick that I took into the studio and the others said, What are we going to start with? and I said, I've got this song. Charlie [Watts] was sitting behind his kit, so he was already into it and then Keith and Mick both got into the motion of it. That was 'Hey Negrita', which came together very easily. The key to getting a song across in this band is never to try and write all the words. If you've got the rhythm, you're lucky! Let Mick write the words and then you're in with a chance."

In his review, Bill Janovitz says, "[Hey Negrita] straddles Latin, reggae, and funk musical styles. Mick Jagger had been spending a lot of time in New York City and absorbing new elements of dance music, specifically Latin forms." Black and Blue is known for its heavy contribution from Stones recording and touring veteran Billy Preston, of which Janovitz says, "...Preston plays a very percussive Afro-Cuban-sounding piano part over the... riff." Also prominent is Ollie Brown (another veteran of the Stones' mid-1970s tours) who provides the song's heavily Latin-influenced percussion.

Of the song's substance, Jagger says, "I hate telling about it. If I tell you what the song is about, will you put it in your own words? Okay: it’s about a South American whore, and the singer, a poor man, is trying to get her price down.One last dollar / I’ve got my pride / I’ll cut your balls and I’ll tan your hide. A very deep subject, eh?”.

Janovitz concludes, "Mostly, though, the lyrics are meant to stay out of the way of the groove and are an excuse to throw in some fresh-sounding Spanish phrases. But the song did little to avoid the controversy the Stones continued to stoke..." This song, along with some of the promotional billboards for Black and Blue, were called out for their apparent sexist content directed towards women, a criticism not new to the Stones at the time.

While considered "splendid... edgy, funky" by Janovitz and popular among Stones fans, it is considered one of the songs that earned Black and Blue its unofficial title as the Stones' "jam album". Recorded in December 1974 and in March and April 1975 at Munich and Mountain Recording Studios in Montreux, "Hey Negrita" features Jagger on lead vocals, Richards and Wood (lead) on guitars, Bill Wyman on bass, and Watts on drums. In addition to piano, Preston also performs organ and backing vocals with Richards and Wood.

"Hey Negrita" has only been performed live during the Tour of Europe '76.

In 2008, the song was covered by the band's touring saxophonist Tim Ries in his album Stones World: The Rolling Stones Project II, with Richards and Watts also playing in the track.

The Italian rock band Negrita was named after this song, and the last track in their debut eponymous album, titled "Ehi! Negrita", is clearly musically inspired by the original Rolling Stones song.

The English country blues band Hey Negrita is also named after this song.

== Personnel ==
According to the authors Philippe Margotin and Jean-Michel Guesdon:

The Rolling Stones

- Mick Jagger – lead vocals
- Keith Richards – rhythm guitar, backing vocals
- Ronnie Wood – lead guitar, backing vocals
- Bill Wyman – bass guitar
- Charlie Watts – drums

Additional personnel

- Billy Preston – piano, organ (?), backing vocals
- Ollie E. Brown – percussion

Technical

- Producers – The Glimmer Twins
- Engineers – Keith Harwood, Glyn Johns, Phil McDonald, Lew Hahn
- Assistant engineers – Jeremy Gee, Dave Richards, Tapani Tapanainen, Steve Dowd, Gene Paul, Lee Hulko
