= Hand of Fate (song) =

Song by the Rolling Stones

from the album Black and Blue
- Released: 23 April 1976
- Recorded: March–December 1975
- Studio: Musicland (Munich); Mountain (Montreux)
- Genre: Rock
- Length: 4:28
- Label: Rolling Stones
- Songwriter: Jagger–Richards
- Producer: The Glimmer Twins

"Hand of Fate" is a song by the English rock band the Rolling Stones. It was written by Mick Jagger and Keith Richards and released as the second track on the band's thirteenth studio album Black and Blue (1976). Recorded between March and December 1975, the song features Wayne Perkins on electric guitar, as well as Billy Preston on piano and Ollie E. Brown on percussion. Ron Wood, who joined the band during the recording of the album, contributes backing vocals.

"Hand of Fate" has received positive reviews from critics, being considered a highlight of its parent album and receiving praise for Perkins' soloing.

== Overview ==
According to Alex Clayson, the backing track for "Hand of Fate" was recorded at Musicland Studios on 25 March 1975. Writers Philippe Margotin and Jean-Michel Guesdon note that further recording occurred at the same studio in December 1975, while additional recording was carried out at Mountain Studios between October and November of that year. Lead guitar is performed by Wayne Perkins, as the band was seeking new guitarists following the departure of Mick Taylor. Margotin and Guesdon suggest that Richards is most likely playing in open G tuning on a Fender Telecaster through a Twin Reverb amplifier.

Clayson describes the song as a "deceptively fast tale of a doomed murderer on the run". Similarly, writer Steve Appleford characterizes its narrator as "a man on the run after committing murder over the love of a woman", with the song taking a "vaguely spiritual" tone. Jagger himself has described the lyrics as a "simple" and "chopped up" narrative about "someone whose woman you take and he decides to take her back". Perkins' lead playing has received comparisons to Taylor, with elements of jazz present. Bud Scoppa of Rolling Stone described Jagger's performance as "employ[ing] his voice as a rhythm instrument".

== Reception ==
Billboard praised the song for its "vintage Jagger vocal styling" and Richards' "clever yet uncomplicated guitar work". American Songwriter included it on a list of songs which deserved to be considered "rock standards", praising the "unique flair" of Perkins' guitar, which "strike[s] the perfect chord between the titular Stones sound and melodic blues". David Marchese of Vulture ranked it as the band's 107th-best song, highlighting Richards' "massive" riffs, as well as the choruses, Watts' drumming, Jagger's "murder-story" lyrics, and the "resigned desperation" of his vocal performance. Rolling Stone listed it as the band's 68th-best, praising Perkins' "sterling" solo. Previously, the magazine had praised the track in a 2004 retrospective of Black and Blue, calling it "swaggering" and "nonchalant", while noting its status as "perhaps the least exposed of the band's classic rock numbers".

== Personnel ==
Adapted from Margotin and Guesdon:

Musicians

- Mick Jagger – vocals
- Keith Richards – rhythm guitar, backing vocals
- Ron Wood – backing vocals
- Bill Wyman – bass
- Charlie Watts – drums
- Billy Preston – piano
- Ollie E. Brown – percussion
- Wayne Perkins – rhythm and lead guitar

Technical

- The Glimmer Twins – production
- Keith Harwood – sound engineer
- Phil McDonald – sound engineer
- Lew Hahn – sound engineer
- Jeremy Gee – assistant sound engineer
- Dave Richards – assistant sound engineer
- Tapani Tapanainen – assistant sound engineer
- Steve Dowd – assistant sound engineer
- Gene Paul – assistant sound engineer
- Lee Huiko – assistant sound engineer
