= Trax =

Trax may refer to:

== Music ==
- Trax (album), the debut album from Japanese electronic music group Ravex
- TRAX (band), a Korean rock band
- Trax Records, first house music label owned by Larry Sherman in Chicago
- Trax, a discontinued MIDI sequencer made by Passport Designs
- Trax (duo), featuring the Danish singer Lise Haavik

== Transport ==
=== Automobiles ===
- Chevrolet Trax, a subcompact SUV introduced in 2012
- Chevrolet Trax (concept car), a subcompact crossover SUV concept that debuted in 2007
- Force Trax, a mid-size SUV built since 1988, originally called Bajaj Tempo Trax

=== Rail ===
- TRAX (light rail), a light rail system in the Salt Lake City area

== Computing ==
- TrAX, the Transformation API for XML (now considered a part of JAXP)
- Trax Image Recognition, also known as Trax Retail, a Singaporean software technology company

== Toys and games ==
- Trax (board game), a strategy board game played with tiles
- Trax (video game), a shooter game developed by HAL Laboratory
- Trax Models, a brand of Australian classic diecast model cars and buses

== Other uses ==
- LG Trax (CU575), a mobile phone from AT&T Mobility
- Trax (music venue), New York City
- Trax (nightclub), Charlottesville, Virginia
- Trax Colton (1929–2025), American film actor
- Trax FM, a radio station based in South Yorkshire, England

== See also ==
- Tracks (disambiguation)
- TRAXX (disambiguation)
- Thrax (disambiguation)
