= Fool to Cry =

Single by The Rolling Stones

from the album Black and Blue
- B-side: "Crazy Mama" (UK); "Hot Stuff" (US)
- Released: 16 April 1976
- Studio: Musicland, Munich, Germany
- Genre: Soul
- Length: 4:08 (single edit); 5:04 (album version)
- Label: Rolling Stones
- Songwriter: Jagger/Richards
- Producer: The Glimmer Twins

The Rolling Stones singles chronology
"Out of Time" (1975)	"Fool to Cry" (1976)	"Hot Stuff" (1976)

Official video
- "Fool to Cry" on YouTube

"Fool to Cry" is a ballad by English rock band the Rolling Stones from their 1976 album Black and Blue.

The song was written by Mick Jagger and Keith Richards. Mick Taylor had just left the band and the Stones were left without a lead guitarist. The recording of Black and Blue acted as a sort of audition for new guitarists, which led to session man Wayne Perkins playing guitar on this track. Jagger plays electric piano and Nicky Hopkins performs acoustic piano on the track, with Hopkins also playing the string synthesizer.

Released as the lead single off Black and Blue in 1976, "Fool to Cry" reached No. 6 on the UK Singles Chart and No. 10 on the US Billboard Hot 100. The full track lasts just over five minutes, whereas the single (as well as edits, this also fades out at the end) lasts just over four minutes.

Cash Box called this "a departure for the Stones", saying that "the beat is relaxed, vocals are laid over a foundation of Fender Rhodes and guitar, all played with funky style" and also praised Jagger's falsetto vocals and Richards' "searing guitar riffs". Record World said that "this ballad rivals 'Angie' in its soul drenching qualities" and noted that there were "superb performances all around".

"Fool to Cry" was the only track from Black and Blue to appear on the Stones' career-spanning greatest hits albums Forty Licks in 2002 and GRRR! in 2012.

It is currently the most performed track off Black and Blue. The song made its debut on the band's 1976 European tour and was performed often. The song would not be played again until the Voodoo Lounge Tour and was played sporadically on the band's Bridges to Babylon and No Security tours. The song would not be played again until 2018 during the No Filter tour.

== Personnel ==
According to the authors Philippe Margotin and Jean-Michel Guesdon:

The Rolling Stones

- Mick Jagger – vocals, electric piano
- Keith Richards – rhythm guitar
- Bill Wyman – bass guitar
- Charlie Watts – drums

Additional personnel

- Nicky Hopkins – piano, synthesiser (strings)
- Wayne Perkins – lead guitar

Technical

- Producers – The Glimmer Twins
- Engineers – Keith Harwood, Glyn Johns, Phil McDonald, Lew Hahn
- Assistant engineers – Jeremy Gee, Dave Richards, Tapani Tapanainen, Steve Dowd, Gene Paul, Lee Hulko

== Chart performance ==
=== Weekly charts ===
Chart (1976)	Peak position
Australia (Kent Music Report)	45
Belgium (Ultratop 50 Flanders)	16
Canada (CKLG Top 30)	4
Canada Top Singles (RPM)	11
Ireland (IRMA)	6
Netherlands (Dutch Top 40)	8
Netherlands (Single Top 100)	10
New Zealand (Recorded Music NZ)	38
France (SNEP)	17
Norway (VG-lista)	8
Spain (AFE)	26
UK Singles (Official Charts)	6
US Billboard Hot 100	10
US Cash Box Top 100	9
US Cash Box Most Added Records	1
US Cash Box Radio Active Singles	7
US Record World	23

=== Year-end charts ===
Chart (1976)	Rank
Canada Top Singles (RPM)	115

== Covers ==
Alternative rock band Ween recorded a cover of the song during the sessions for their 1996 album 12 Golden Country Greats which was subsequently submitted for consideration for the soundtrack to the Uma Thurman feature Beautiful Girls. However it was rejected in favour of the band's own "I'll Miss You". The recording is on the 2026 expanded reissue of 12 Golden Country Greats. Lena Dunham, creator and star of HBO's Golden Globe-winning show Girls, commissioned Tegan and Sara to cover the Rolling Stones' "Fool to Cry" for the show's official soundtrack. American singer and songwriter Taylor Dayne covered the song for her 2008 studio album Satisfied.
