= L.A. Friday (Live 1975) =

Live album by the Rolling Stones
- Released: 2 April 2012
- Recorded: Sunday 13 July 1975 (album); Saturday 12 July 1975 (DVD)
- Venues: The Forum, Inglewood, California
- Genre: Rock
- Length: 146:31
- Label: Promotone BV

The Rolling Stones (Live) chronology
Hampton Coliseum (Live 1981) (2012)	L.A. Friday (Live 1975) (2012)	Live at the Checkerboard Lounge, Chicago 1981 (2012)

L.A. Friday (Live 1975) is a live album by the Rolling Stones, released in 2012. It was recorded at The Forum in Inglewood, California, near Los Angeles. The album was released exclusively as a digital download through Google Music on 2 April 2012. The concert was on Sunday 13 July 1975, but bootleggers used Rolling Stone magazine's title of the review of the Friday show for its vinyl bootleg releases.

A DVD for the Friday 12 July 1975 concert at the Forum was released on 19 November 2014 titled From the Vault: L.A. Forum (Live in 1975).

The set list was the same for both shows, except for the placement of the band introductions.

== Track listing ==
=== Album ===
Recorded Sunday, 13 July 1975

All tracks are written by Mick Jagger and Keith Richards, except where noted.

L.A. Friday (Live 1975) track listing
No.	Title	Writer(s)	Length
1.	"Honky Tonk Women"		5:29
2.	"All Down the Line"		4:05
3.	"If You Can't Rock Me / Get Off of My Cloud"		7:26
4.	"Star Star"		4:45
5.	"Gimme Shelter"		6:12
6.	"Ain't Too Proud to Beg"	Norman Whitfield; Eddie Holland	4:25
7.	"You Gotta Move"	Fred McDowell; Gary Davis	4:32
8.	"You Can't Always Get What You Want"		15:23
9.	"Happy"		3:59
10.	"Tumbling Dice"		5:23
11.	"Band Intros"		1:20
12.	"It's Only Rock 'n Roll (But I Like It)"		6:04
13.	"Doo Doo Doo Doo Doo (Heartbreaker)"		5:02
14.	"Fingerprint File"		9:23
15.	"Angie"		5:18
16.	"Wild Horses"		7:25
17.	"That's Life" (with Billy Preston)	Billy Preston	3:17
18.	"Outa-Space" (with Billy Preston)	Billy Preston; Joe Greene	4:04
19.	"Brown Sugar"		4:15
20.	"Midnight Rambler"		15:15
21.	"Rip This Joint"		2:06
22.	"Street Fighting Man"		4:05
23.	"Jumpin' Jack Flash"		6:57
24.	"Sympathy for the Devil"		10:21
Total length:			146:31

=== DVD ===
Recorded Friday, 12 July 1975.

All tracks are written by Mick Jagger and Keith Richards, except where noted.

DVD track listing
No.	Title	Writer(s)	Length
1.	"Introduction" (includes excerpt from "Fanfare for the Common Man")	Aaron Copland	1:52
2.	"Honky Tonk Women"		5:07
3.	"All Down the Line"		4:10
4.	"If You Can't Rock Me / Get Off of My Cloud"		7:51
5.	"Star Star"		4:45
6.	"Gimme Shelter"		5:31
7.	"Ain't Too Proud to Beg"	Norman Whitfield, Eddie Holland	4:58
8.	"You Gotta Move"	Fred McDowell, Gary Davis	4:39
9.	"You Can't Always Get What You Want"		15:56
10.	"Happy"		4:03
11.	"Tumbling Dice"		6:03
12.	"It's Only Rock 'n Roll (But I Like It)"		5:16
13.	"Band Intros"		2:19
14.	"Doo Doo Doo Doo Doo (Heartbreaker)"		5:30
15.	"Fingerprint File"		9:56
16.	"Angie"		5:29
17.	"Wild Horses"		7:48
18.	"That's Life" (with Billy Preston)	Billy Preston	3:45
19.	"Outa-Space" (with Billy Preston)	Billy Preston, Joe Greene	5:21
20.	"Brown Sugar"		4:06
21.	"Midnight Rambler"		16:33
22.	"Rip This Joint"		2:07
23.	"Street Fighting Man"		5:03
24.	"Jumpin' Jack Flash"		9:47
25.	"Sympathy for the Devil"		10:43
Total length:			158:57

== Personnel ==
The Rolling Stones

- Mick Jagger – vocals, harmonica; guitar on "Fingerprint File"
- Keith Richards – guitars, backing vocals; lead vocals on "Happy"
- Bill Wyman – bass guitar; synthesizer on "Fingerprint File"
- Charlie Watts – drums; percussion on "That's Life" and "Outa-Space"
- Ronnie Wood – guitars, backing vocals; bass guitar on "Fingerprint File"

Additional musicians

- Ollie E. Brown – percussion, backing vocals; drums on "That's Life" and "Outa-Space"
- Billy Preston – piano, organ, clavinet, synthesizer, backing vocals; lead vocals on "That's Life"
- Ian Stewart – piano on selected songs
- Bobby Keys – saxophone on Brown Sugar, Rip This Joint and Street Fighting Man
- Steve Madaio – trumpet on Rip This Joint and Street Fighting Man
- Trevor Lawrence – saxophone on You Can't Always get What You Want, Rip This Joint and Street Fighting Man
- Jesse Ed Davis – guitar on "Sympathy for the Devil" (13 July show only)
- The Steel Association – percussion on "Sympathy for the Devil"
