= Traxx =

Traxx may refer to

- Alstom Traxx, formerly Bombardier TRAXX, a family of locomotives
- American Dance Traxx, an American dance music countdown program
- TraxX, a South Korean electronic dance music group
- Traxx (film), a 1988 film with Shadoe Stevens and Priscilla Barnes
- Traxx (video game), a computer maze game released in 1983 by Quicksilva
- TraXX FM, a radio station operated by Radio Televisyen Malaysia
- Traxx Radio, a former independent digital media broadcaster based in Brisbane, Australia
- Y-Traxx, a defunct band

== See also ==
- Trax (disambiguation)
