= Fingerprint File =

Song by The Rolling Stones

from the album It's Only Rock 'n Roll
- Released: 31 August 1974
- Genre: Funk rock; disco-rock
- Length: 6:33
- Label: Rolling Stones
- Songwriter: Mick Jagger/Keith Richards
- Producer: The Glimmer Twins

"Fingerprint File" is the closing track from the Rolling Stones' 1974 album It's Only Rock 'n Roll. It is one of their first attempts to branch out into dance or electronic music, and the song resembles music by Sly and the Family Stone. Key ingredients of the song are the rhythm guitar played by Mick Jagger on a 1954 Gibson Les Paul Custom, and features heavy phasing due to the use of a Leslie Speaker and stereo mixing, and the highly jazz/funk-oriented bass guitar played by Mick Taylor. Keith Richards uses the wah-wah pedal for his guitar part. Bill Wyman is on synthesiser, Charlie Watts on drums, Billy Preston on clavinet, and Nicky Hopkins on piano. Charlie Jolly Kunjappu is featured on the tabla.

The lyrics express frustration over government monitoring and surveillance activity.

A live version recorded in Toronto is featured on the 1977 live album Love You Live and the 2012 live album L.A. Friday (Live 1975), both recorded during the Rolling Stones Tour of the Americas '75.

On most releases of It's Only Rock 'n Roll, "Fingerprint File" is mastered at a faster speed than the original recording, bringing the song's key from B Minor to C Minor and adding energy and oomph. A 2011 Japanese SHM-SACD reissue of the album features a speed-corrected version of the song, running about a half-minute longer than on other releases.
