= The Rolling Stones' Tour of the Americas '75 =

1975 concert tour by the Rolling Stones

The Rolling Stones Tour of the Americas '75
- Continental tour by The Rolling Stones
- Location: North America
- Start date: 1 June 1975
- End date: 8 August 1975
- Legs: 1
- No. of shows: 46

The Rolling Stones concert chronology
- European Tour 1973; Tour of the Americas '75; Tour of Europe '76

The Rolling Stones' Tour of the Americas '75 was a 1975 concert tour originally intended to reach both North and South America. The plans for concerts in Central and South America never solidified, however, and the tour covered only the United States and Canada.

== History ==
After the departure of Mick Taylor, this was the Rolling Stones' first tour with new guitarist Ronnie Wood. Announced on 14 April as merely playing with the band on the tour, it would not be until 19 December that he would be officially named a Rolling Stone. Longtime sidemen Bobby Keys and Jim Price on brass were not featured on this tour, while Billy Preston had replaced Nicky Hopkins on keyboards in 1973. Additionally, Ollie E. Brown was added as an additional percussionist. Keys made a guest appearance on "You Can't Always Get What You Want" and "Brown Sugar" at the Los Angeles shows.

The Tour of the Americas '75 was not tied to support of any newly released material, as it began more than seven months after the release of their last studio album at the time, It's Only Rock'n Roll. Instead, the compilation album Made in the Shade was released to capitalise on the tour's publicity.

The announcement of the tour became famous in itself. On 1 May, reporters were gathered inside the Fifth Avenue Hotel on 9th Street in New York City's Greenwich Village to attend a press conference where the Stones were scheduled to appear. But the Stones never went into the hotel. Improvisational comedian "Professor" Irwin Corey gave a typically long-winded, nonsensical performance for journalists waiting for the Stones. The press was still listening to Corey ramble on when they finally noticed that the Stones were playing "Brown Sugar" on a flatbed truck driving down Fifth Avenue.

The handful of curiosity seekers standing outside the hotel – who'd heard a rumor of the press conference and who were hoping to catch a glimpse of the Stones entering the hotel – were instead treated to the sight of a flatbed truck rolling down Fifth Avenue carrying the Stones, their instruments and a wall of amps. The truck stopped in front of the hotel entrance and the band played an extended version of "Brown Sugar". Charlie Watts had suggested this adaptation of a promotional gimmick often used by New Orleans jazz musicians; the idea was later emulated by groups like AC/DC and U2. After the Stones finished the song, the flatbed truck rolled down Fifth Avenue another block and the band jumped into limousines. They never attended the press conference.

The mid-1970s were the era of extravagant stage shows, from the likes of Led Zeppelin, Alice Cooper, Kiss and Queen. In keeping with this, the Stones embraced a new format for the 1975 concerts. Their act was aided by theatrical stage props and gimmicks. During "Star Star", a giant inflatable phallus emerged from below the stage. The band nicknamed it "Tired Grandfather", since it sometimes malfunctioned. Most shows also featured an unfolding stage shaped like a lotus flower, designed by Charlie Watts. In The Village Voice, Karen Durbin lamented the penis balloon , "the gimmick seems sophomoric and second-rate, devoid of the multiple meanings that one has come to expect from the Stones. It’s dumb, and you expect the Stones to be smart".

The group played two warmup shows on 1 June at Louisiana State University in Baton Rouge, Louisiana. The tour officially began on 3 June 1975 at the Convention Center in San Antonio, Texas. A local judge threatened to arrest the band if they deployed their penis balloon. It was the only time the prop did not appear onstage. It was sometimes painted to resemble a finger.

The tour continued, playing mostly arenas in the United States and Canada, including six consecutive nights at Madison Square Garden in New York and five nights at The Forum in Los Angeles. However, a planned Latin American leg in Mexico, Brazil, and Venezuela for the balance of August was cancelled due to a combination of currency fluctuations and security concerns. Four additional US dates were then added, culminating in a final performance on 8 August at Rich Stadium near Buffalo, New York.

The 1977 live album Love You Live has "Fingerprint File" and "It's Only Rock 'n Roll" from 17 June 1975 in Toronto, and "Sympathy for the Devil" from 9 July 1975 in Los Angeles.

In 2012, the entire show from 13 July 1975 in Los Angeles was released as part of the 'Rolling Stones Archive', mixed and remastered by Bob Clearmountain. This show was previously available in excellent audience quality on the 'LA Friday' bootleg. The title is a reference to a Rolling Stone review of the show on Friday, 11 July 1975, even though the actual featured show was from Sunday, 13 July.

== Personnel ==
=== The Rolling Stones ===
- Mick Jagger – lead vocals, harmonica, guitar on "Fingerprint File"
- Keith Richards – guitars, vocals
- Bill Wyman – bass guitar, synthesiser on "Fingerprint File"
- Charlie Watts – drums, percussion

=== Additional musicians ===
- Ronnie Wood – guitar, backing vocals, bass guitar on "Fingerprint File"
- Billy Preston – keyboards, vocals
- Ollie Brown – percussion, drums on "That's Life" (sung by Billy Preston) and "Outa-Space" (led by Billy Preston)
- Ian Stewart – piano

New York, Madison Square Garden, June 22, 23, 24, 25, 26, 27:

- The Steel Association – percussion on 'Sympathy for the Devil'

New York, Madison Square Garden, June 22:

- Eric Clapton – guitar on 'Sympathy for the Devil'

New York, Madison Square Garden, June 27:

- Carlos Santana – guitar on 'Sympathy for the Devil'

Los Angeles Forum, July 9, 10, 11, 12, 13 shows only:

- Steve Madaio – trumpet
- Trevor Lawrence, Bobby Keys – saxophone
- The Steel Association – percussion on 'Sympathy for the Devil'

Los Angeles Forum, July 13:

- Jesse Ed Davis – guitar on 'Sympathy For The Devil'

== Tour set list ==
The most typical set list for the shows was:

Intro music: Fanfare for the Common Man

1. "Honky Tonk Women"
2. "All Down the Line"
3. "If You Can't Rock Me"/"Get Off of My Cloud"
4. "Star Star"
5. "Gimme Shelter"
6. "Ain't Too Proud to Beg"
7. "You Gotta Move"
8. "You Can't Always Get What You Want"
9. "Happy"
10. "Tumbling Dice"
11. "It's Only Rock 'n Roll (But I Like It)"
12. "Doo Doo Doo Doo Doo (Heartbreaker)"
13. "Fingerprint File"
14. "Angie"
15. "Wild Horses"
16. "That's Life" (sung by Billy Preston)
17. "Outa-Space" (led by Billy Preston)
18. "Brown Sugar"
19. "Midnight Rambler"
20. "Rip This Joint"
21. "Street Fighting Man"
22. "Jumpin' Jack Flash"
23. Encore: for the New York City and Los Angeles shows "Sympathy for the Devil" was played as an encore, with Eric Clapton and Carlos Santana guesting in New York City and Jesse Ed Davis guesting in Los Angeles.

The set was longer than on previous tours, and set list variation was a bit more frequent, with several tunes making sporadic appearances: "Rocks Off", "Luxury", "Dance Little Sister", "Cherry Oh, Baby" and "Sure the One You Need". Otherwise, as with their 1972 American Tour, the band's pre-1968 catalogue was almost completely ignored except "Get Off of My Cloud", and their signature song "(I Can't Get No) Satisfaction" absent.

== Tour dates ==
Date	City	Country	Venue	Opening act(s)
Tour
1 June 1975 (2 shows)	Baton Rouge	United States	LSU Assembly Center	—N/a
3 June 1975	San Antonio	United States	San Antonio Convention Center	—N/a
4 June 1975	San Antonio	United States	San Antonio Convention Center	—N/a
6 June 1975	Kansas City	United States	Arrowhead Stadium	Eagles; Rufus; The Gap Band
8 June 1975	Milwaukee	United States	Milwaukee County Stadium	Eagles; Rufus; The Gap Band
9 June 1975	Saint Paul	United States	St. Paul Civic Center	Chaka Khan
11 June 1975	Boston	United States	Boston Garden	Chaka Khan
12 June 1975	Boston	United States	Boston Garden	Chaka Khan
14 June 1975	Cleveland	United States	World Series of Rock – Cleveland Stadium	Tower of Power; The J. Geils Band; Joe Vitale's Madmen
15 June 1975	Buffalo	United States	Buffalo Memorial Auditorium	—N/a
17 June 1975	Toronto	Canada	Maple Leaf Gardens	—N/a
18 June 1975	Toronto	Canada	Maple Leaf Gardens	—N/a
22 June 1975	New York City	United States	Madison Square Garden	Eagles; Rufus; The Gap Band
23 June 1975	New York City	United States	Madison Square Garden	Eagles; Rufus; The Gap Band
24 June 1975	New York City	United States	Madison Square Garden	Eagles; Rufus; The Gap Band
25 June 1975	New York City	United States	Madison Square Garden	Eagles; Rufus; The Gap Band
26 June 1975	New York City	United States	Madison Square Garden	Eagles; Rufus; The Gap Band
27 June 1975	New York City	United States	Madison Square Garden	Eagles; Rufus; The Gap Band
29 June 1975	Philadelphia	United States	The Spectrum	—N/a
30 June 1975	Philadelphia	United States	The Spectrum	Eagles; The Commodores
1 July 1975	Landover	United States	Capital Centre	Eagles; Rufus; The Gap Band
2 July 1975	Landover	United States	Capital Centre	Eagles; Rufus; The Gap Band
4 July 1975	Memphis	United States	Memphis Memorial Stadium	The J. Geils Band; The Charlie Daniels Band; The Meters; Furry Lewis
6 July 1975	Dallas	United States	Cotton Bowl	Eagles; Montrose; Trapeze
9 July 1975	Inglewood	United States	The Forum	Eagles; Rufus; The Gap Band
10 July 1975	Inglewood	United States	The Forum	Eagles; Rufus; The Gap Band
11 July 1975	Inglewood	United States	The Forum	Eagles; Rufus; The Gap Band
12 July 1975	Inglewood	United States	The Forum	Eagles; Rufus; The Gap Band
13 July 1975	Inglewood	United States	The Forum	Eagles; Rufus; The Gap Band
15 July 1975	Daly City	United States	Cow Palace	The Meters
16 July 1975	Daly City	United States	Cow Palace	The Meters
18 July 1975	Seattle	United States	Seattle Center Coliseum	—N/a
20 July 1975	Fort Collins	United States	Hughes Stadium	—N/a
22 July 1975	Chicago	United States	Chicago Stadium	The Crusaders
23 July 1975	Chicago	United States	Chicago Stadium	Electric Light Orchestra
24 July 1975	Chicago	United States	Chicago Stadium	Electric Light Orchestra
26 July 1975	Bloomington	United States	Assembly Hall	The Crusaders
27 July 1975	Detroit	United States	Cobo Arena	—N/a
28 July 1975	Detroit	United States	Cobo Arena	—N/a
30 July 1975	Atlanta	United States	Omni Coliseum	The Meters
31 July 1975	Greensboro	United States	Greensboro Memorial Coliseum	The Meters
2 August 1975	Jacksonville	United States	Gator Bowl Stadium	Atlanta Rhythm Section; Rufus; The J. Geils Band
4 August 1975	Louisville	United States	Freedom Hall	Outlaws
6 August 1975	Hampton	United States	Hampton Coliseum	The Outlaws
8 August 1975	Orchard Park	United States	Rich Stadium	Rufus; The Gap Band; Outlaws

== Tickets ==
Tickets were sold by direct mail order by the concert venue, not a national ticket seller in 1975. For example, A ticket request and a check for $12 (US) was required for each ticket sale for the Jacksonville show sent by US Mail, and was fulfilled in about two weeks.
