= Hot Stuff (Rolling Stones song) =

Promotional single by the Rolling Stones

from the album Black and Blue
- B-side: "Hot Stuff (Short Edit)"
- Released: 1976
- Recorded: March–April 1975
- Genre: Funk; disco
- Length: 3:30 (7"); 5:21 (LP)
- Label: Rolling Stones/Virgin
- Songwriter: Jagger/Richards
- Producer: The Glimmer Twins

The Rolling Stones singles chronology
| "Fool to Cry" (1976) | "Hot Stuff" (1976) | "Miss You" (1978) |

Black and Blue track listing
- 8 tracks Side one: 1. "Hot Stuff"; 2. "Hand of Fate"; 3. "Cherry Oh Baby"; 4. "Memory Motel"; Side two: 5. "Hey Negrita"; 6. "Melody"; 7. "Fool to Cry"; 8. "Crazy Mama"

"Hot Stuff" is a song by English rock and roll band the Rolling Stones written by Mick Jagger and Keith Richards, for their 1976 album Black and Blue.

== Background ==
"Hot Stuff" was recorded in March, October and December 1975 during the Black and Blue sessions, and is heavily influenced by the disco/funk sounds of the day, with Charlie Watts laying down a heavy drum pattern accompanied by Ollie E. Brown on percussion, Bill Wyman adding a funky bassline, and extensive use of the Mu-Tron III pedal by guest guitarist Harvey Mandel, formerly of Canned Heat. Mandel plays the lead guitar parts on the song and was one of the guitarists in consideration for replacing the departed Mick Taylor's slot as the Stones' lead guitarist, a position eventually filled by Ron Wood. Billy Preston plays piano on the recording and contributes backing vocals along with Richards and Wood. The video, however, features Wood on guitar playing Mandel's part.

== Reception ==
Cash Box said that it "is a hot disco tune, with driving, fleshed-out R&B overtones".

== Chart performance ==
The song was released as a US promo single from Black and Blue (following the worldwide top 10 hit "Fool to Cry"). "Hot Stuff" was not as successful as its predecessor, reaching No. 49 in the United States. Despite the relative failure of the single, the band continued to explore the disco/funk sounds heard on the recording with later albums and singles—their next single, the disco-infused "Miss You", reached the top position in the US two years later.

== Personnel ==
According to the authors Philippe Margotin and Jean-Michel Guesdon:

The Rolling Stones

- Mick Jagger – lead vocals, percussion
- Keith Richards – rhythm guitars, backing vocals
- Ronnie Wood – backing vocals
- Bill Wyman – bass guitar, percussion
- Charlie Watts – drums, percussion

Additional personnel

- Billy Preston – piano, backing vocals
- Harvey Mandel – lead guitar
- Ollie E. Brown – timbales, cowbell

Technical

- Producers – The Glimmer Twins
- Engineers – Keith Harwood, Glyn Johns, Phil McDonald, Lew Hahn
- Assistant engineers – Jeremy Gee, Dave Richards, Tapani Tapanainen, Steve Dowd, Gene Paul, Lee Hulko
