= Chelsea Drugstore =

Building in Chelsea, London, England

Coordinates: 51.4898°N 0.1628°W

The Chelsea Drugstore in west London

The Chelsea Drugstore was a sleek, modern travertine and brushed steel building on the corner of Royal Avenue and King's Road, Chelsea, London. It opened in 1968. Designed by architect Antony Cloughley and designer Colin Golding of GCB Associates, and inspired by Le Drugstore on Boulevard St Germain in Paris that was designed by Slavik (decorator) (Wiatscheslav Vassiliev), Chelsea Drugstore was arranged over three floors and on most days remained open for up to 16 hours. Inside customers would find bars, a chemist, newsstands, record stores and other concessions. A popular service was the 'flying squad' delivery option run by the store. Those who used this service would have their purchases delivered by hand by young ladies adorned in purple catsuits arriving on flashy motorcycles. It closed briefly in 1971 after three years, reopening in September 1972. Both pub and retail shops below were open until 1985. The store became a wine bar, and later a McDonald's, which permanently closed on 6 July 2025.

== In popular culture ==
The store is notably mentioned in The Rolling Stones song "You Can't Always Get What You Want", in which Mick Jagger sings of meeting "Mr Jimmy" and in The Kinks song "Did Ya", where Ray Davies sings "Now the Chelsea Drugstore needs a fix, it's in a state of ill repair". Chelsea Drugstore is also the title of a 2012 EP by UK band The Jetsonics as well as it being a film location in Stanley Kubrick's A Clockwork Orange.
