= Colin Golding =

English musician, early member of The Rolling Stones

Colin Anthony Golding (born 2 August 1941, Sutton, Surrey) is a British former bass guitarist who, from late 1962 to early 1963, was a frequent fill in member for The Rolling Stones.

In September 1962, Dick Taylor left the Rolling Stones to attend Art College. For the next few months, various people filled in on bass guitar, and Golding was the bassist that attended the most during this time, playing around eight gigs. Golding left working for the Stones in order to get a job. Ricky Fenson then came to be a permanent member, who in turn was then replaced by Bill Wyman.

Golding was then given a job as design assistant at a company called Intra Design. He then worked at an architecture practice in Belgravia when Intra Design shut down in 1966. Golding then set up his own practice, based in his home. Golding and Antony Cloughley designed the Chelsea Drugstore (with Garnett Cloughley Blakemore architects).
