= Love You Live =

Live album by the Rolling Stones
- Released: 23 September 1977
- Recorded: 17 June 1975: Maple Leaf Gardens, Toronto; 9 July 1975: Inglewood Forum, Los Angeles; 27 May 1976: Earls Court, London; 5–7 June 1976: Les Abattoirs, Paris; 4 and 5 March 1977: El Mocambo, Toronto
- Genre: Hard rock
- Length: 83:12
- Label: Rolling Stones/Atlantic
- Producer: Mick Jagger/Keith Richards

The Rolling Stones chronology
Black and Blue (1976)	Love You Live (1977)	Some Girls (1978)

Professional ratings
Review scores
Source	Rating
AllMusic	2/5 stars
Christgau's Record Guide	C+
MusicHound Rock	1/5 stars
The Rolling Stone Album Guide	2/5 stars
The Village Voice	C+

Love You Live is a double live album by the Rolling Stones, released in 1977. It is drawn from Tour of the Americas shows in Canada and the US in the summer of 1975, Tour of Europe shows in 1976 and performances from the El Mocambo nightclub concert venue in Toronto in 1977. It is the band's third official full-length live release and is dedicated to the memory of audio engineer Keith Harwood, who died in a car accident shortly before the album's release. It is also the band's first live album with Ronnie Wood.

== History ==
Love You Live was overdubbed and mixed from late May to mid-June 1977. The album artwork was created by Pop artist Andy Warhol. The hand-drawn titles across the front were added by Mick Jagger, to Warhol's dismay. Warhol recalled in his diary: "I told Jerry I thought Mick had ruined the Love You Live cover I did for them by writing all over it—it's his handwriting, and he wrote so big. The kids who buy the album would have a good piece of art if he hadn't spoiled it."

The Rolling Stones and Warhol attended the launch party for the album at Trax in New York City on September 23, 1977.

The album was well received and managed to reach No. 3 in the UK and No. 5 in the US, where it went gold.

Love You Live was the Rolling Stones' final album whereby Rolling Stones Records was internationally distributed by Warner Music. The band's next several albums were distributed through EMI worldwide, while they remained with Warner in North America only.

In addition to the songs recorded during the 1975–1976 tours, the Stones decided to add four tracks taken from performances at Toronto's El Mocambo club on 4 and 5 March 1977. The intention had been to play a set of the sort of classic blues and R&B covers that sealed the band's reputation when they performed regularly at the Crawdaddy Club in 1963. However, Keith Richards arrived late for scheduled rehearsals as he and his girlfriend, Anita Pallenberg, had been arrested for possession and trafficking of illicit drugs in Richards' Toronto hotel room. More songs recorded at the El Mocambo were finally released in 2022 as the live album El Mocambo 1977.

Despite these legal troubles, the shows themselves went well enough, though the versions that appear on album are heavily overdubbed with new guitar tracks and backing vocals by Richards and/or Ronnie Wood. Jagger overdubbed the harmonica of "Mannish Boy" as well. Only "Around and Around" is untouched. April Wine opened for the Stones, who appeared on the bill under the name "The Cockroaches", so the majority in attendance thought they were attending an April Wine concert. April Wine also recorded their live album Live at the El Mocambo at these same concerts.

Jagger and Richards sharply disagreed on the selection of tracks to include on the album. In his autobiography Richards recalled: "Collaboration was giving way to struggle and disagreement. It's a two-disc album, and the result is that one disc is Mick's and the other was mine."

Another factor from the same biography that may have influenced the recording/overdubbing was the passing of Keith's son Tara. As he recalls: "I was in Paris, with Marlon, on tour when I got the news that our little son Tara, aged just over two months, had been found dead in his cot. I got the phone call as I was getting ready to do the show. And it's a "Sorry to tell you... ," which hits you like a gunshot. And "No doubt you're going to want to cancel the show". And I thought about it for a few seconds and I said, of course we're not cancelling. It would be the worst possible thing because there was nowhere else to go. What am I going to do, drive back to Switzerland and find out what didn't happen? It's happened already. It's done. Or sit there and mope and go bananas and get into, what? Why?"

== Re-releases ==
In 1998, Love You Live was remastered and reissued by Virgin Records, and in 2009, was re-released with an updated remastering by Universal Records. In 2011 it was released on a single SHM-SACD by Universal Music Enterprises Japan.

== Track listing ==
All songs by Mick Jagger and Keith Richards, except where noted.

Side one

1. "Intro: Excerpt from Fanfare for the Common Man" (Aaron Copland) – 1:24
2. "Honky Tonk Women" – 3:19 (5 June 1976: Les Abattoirs, Paris)
3. "If You Can't Rock Me"/"Get Off of My Cloud" – 5:00 (27 May 1976: Earls Court, London)
4. "Happy" – 2:55 (5 June 1976: Les Abattoirs, Paris)
5. "Hot Stuff" – 4:35 (6 June 1976: Les Abattoirs, Paris)
6. "Star Star" – 4:10 (6 June 1976: Les Abattoirs, Paris)

Jagger's remark after 'Happy' is 'do the horrendous to that if you can', taken from The Hague show, May 30, 1976. It refers to a dance Keith Richards and Ron Wood performed backstage where they would be lying on their backs with legs up in the air.

Side two

1. "Tumbling Dice" – 4:00 (7 June 1976: Les Abattoirs, Paris)
2. "Fingerprint File" – 5:17 (17 June 1975: Maple Leaf Gardens, Toronto)
3. "You Gotta Move" (Fred McDowell/Rev. Gary Davis) – 4:19 (5 June 1976: Les Abattoirs, Paris)
4. "You Can't Always Get What You Want" – 7:42 (7 June 1976: Les Abattoirs, Paris)

Side three

1. "Mannish Boy" (Ellas McDaniel/McKinley Morganfield/Mel London) – 6:28 (5 March 1977: El Mocambo, Toronto)
2. "Crackin' Up" (Ellas McDaniel) – 5:40 (5 March 1977: El Mocambo, Toronto)
3. "Little Red Rooster" (Willie Dixon) – 4:39 (4 March 1977: El Mocambo, Toronto)
4. "Around and Around" (Chuck Berry) – 4:09 (5 March 1977: El Mocambo, Toronto)

Side four

1. "It's Only Rock 'n' Roll (But I Like It)" – 4:31 (17 June 1975: Maple Leaf Gardens, Toronto)
2. "Brown Sugar" – 3:11 (6 June 1976: Les Abattoirs, Paris)
3. "Jumpin' Jack Flash" – 4:03 (6 June 1976: Les Abattoirs, Paris)
4. "Sympathy for the Devil" – 7:51 (9 July 1975: Inglewood Forum, Los Angeles)

== Personnel ==
The Rolling Stones

- Mick Jagger – lead vocals, guitar on "Fingerprint File", harmonica on "Mannish Boy" and "Little Red Rooster", piano on "You Can't Always Get What You Want"
- Keith Richards – lead and rhythm guitar, backing vocals, lead vocal on "Happy"
- Ronnie Wood – lead and rhythm guitar, backing vocals, bass guitar on "Fingerprint File"
- Bill Wyman – bass guitar, synthesizer on "Fingerprint File"
- Charlie Watts – drums

Additional personnel

- Ian Stewart – piano
- Billy Preston – piano, organ, clavinet, backing vocals
- Ollie Brown – percussion, backing vocals on "You Gotta Move"

Technical

- Recording engineers – Keith Harwood, Ron Nevison, Eddie Kramer
- Remix engineers – Dave Jerdan, Jimmy Douglass and Eddie Kramer
- Assistant engineers – Tom Heid, Randy Mason, Mick McKenna, and Bobby Warner
- Artwork – Andy Warhol

== Charts ==
=== Weekly charts ===
Weekly chart performance for Love You Live
Chart (1977)	Peak position
Australian Albums (Kent Music Report)	10
Canada Top Albums/CDs (RPM)	3
Dutch Albums (Album Top 100)	2
German Albums (Offizielle Top 100)	22
Italian Albums (Musica e Dischi)	12
Japanese Albums (Oricon)	11
New Zealand Albums (RMNZ)	5
Norwegian Albums (VG-lista)	10
Swedish Albums (Sverigetopplistan)	15
UK Albums (Official Charts)	3
US Billboard 200	5

=== Year-end charts ===
Year-end chart performance for Love You Live
Chart (1977)	Position
Dutch Albums (Album Top 100)	29

== Certifications and sales ==
Certifications and sales for Love You Live
Region	Certification	Certified units/sales
Italy	—	150,000
United Kingdom (BPI)	Gold	100,000^{^}
United States (RIAA)	Gold	500,000^{^}
^{^} Shipments figures based on certification alone.
