= Trax (music venue) =

Defunct music venue in New York City

Coordinates: 40.7774°N 73.9791°W

Trax was a music venue in New York City, located at 100 West 72nd Street on Manhattan's Upper West Side. It was operated by club owner Jimmy Pullis from 1977 until the mid-1980s. Trax became known for rock showcases and a gathering place for record industry personnel.

== History ==
Trax was opened in February 1977 by club owner Jimmy Pullis in the basement of 100 West 72nd Street at the corner of Columbus Avenue on Manhattan's Upper West Side. Pullis, a former car salesman from Rockaway Beach, Queens, had entered the music business after being encouraged by his friend, singer Barry McGuire. Pullis also ran the club JP's on the Upper East Side of Manhattan. In 1978, Pullis said Trax and JP's were being operated "for the trade," providing meeting places where musicians, record executives, radio personnel, journalists, and A&R people could congregate and scout for new talent.

John Rockwell of The New York Times described Trax as a counterpart to Elaine's for the rock and roll crowd. Unlike conventional music venues, Trax did not regularly book established headlining acts. Instead, it was sometimes used for unadvertised showcases. Rockwell noted that record companies could arrange showcases at the club with only a few days' notice, in contrast to venues such as The Bottom Line, which required bookings months in advance.

Trax had a capacity of 280 and was open daily from 8:30 pm to 4 am with a $5 cover charge. By 1982, the club was attempting to attract a broader public on non-industry nights by starting shows earlier, offering admission-free nights, and holding free ladies' nights. Pullis attributed the change partly to cutbacks in the record industry, which had reduced the number of music industry personnel frequenting the club.

In 1985, musicians protested Trax over its payment practices. The Rock/R&B Committee, sponsored by Local 802 Associated Musicians of Greater New York, a chapter of the American Federation of Musicians, organized pickets outside Trax and JP's on March 31 and April 1. The protests followed earlier pickets at Trax on March 1–2. Local 802 treasurer Barry Kornfeld said Pullis had refused to negotiate changes to the "pay to play" policy, under which a band playing at Trax paid a $55 "light and sound" fee and received payment based on customers who came specifically to see the band. The union said a band attracting 74 customers on a weeknight could receive $7.50 before expenses. Record producer John Hammond reportedly sent Pullis a letter, urging him to negotiate, but the union said he had not done so. Pullis refused to comment on the situation.

The exact date of Trax's closure is uncertain. There were shows scheduled through December 21, 1985.

== Notable events ==
On September 23, 1977, the Rolling Stones held a press party at Trax to celebrate the release of their album Love You Live. Following a playback of tracks from the album tracks, guests were shown the concert film Les Rolling Stones aux Abattoirs. Among the attending guests were Pop artist Andy Warhol, who designed the cover; Greek artist Marina Karella; artist Victor Hugo, model ad actress Alana Hamilton; and record executive Ahmet Ertegun.

On March 17, 1978, Warren Zevon performed with John David Souther and Eric Andersen at Trax. The show was attended by singer-songwriters Bruce Springsteen, James Taylor, and Linda Ronstadt; guitarist Dickey Betts; and concert promoter Bill Graham.
