= Black and Blue =

- Front cover with photograph by Hiro

Studio album by the Rolling Stones
- Released: 23 April 1976
- Recorded: 5 December 1974 – 4 April 1975; 19 October 1975 – February 1976 (overdubs)
- Studios: Musicland (Munich); Rolling Stones Mobile (Rotterdam); Mountain Recording (Montreux) (overdubs)
- Genres: Rock; blues rock; disco; funk rock; reggae rock; soul
- Length: 41:09
- Label: Rolling Stones
- Producer: The Glimmer Twins

The Rolling Stones chronology
Made in the Shade (1975)	Black and Blue (1976)	Love You Live (1977)

The Rolling Stones studio album chronology
It's Only Rock 'n Roll (1974)	Black and Blue (1976)	Some Girls (1978)

Singles from Black and Blue
- 1. "Fool to Cry" Released: 16 April 1976

Black and Blue is the thirteenth studio album by the English rock band the Rolling Stones, released on 23 April 1976, by Rolling Stones Records.

Guitarist Mick Taylor quit the band in December 1974 as they were beginning to record the album. The band auditioned several replacements including Wayne Perkins, Harvey Mandel, and Ronnie Wood. The Stones' rhythm section, bassist Bill Wyman and drummer Charlie Watts, appear on nearly all tracks. Frequent collaborators Nicky Hopkins and Billy Preston play keyboards, and percussionist Ollie E. Brown plays on several songs.

It was the Rolling Stones' third self-produced album with Jagger and Richards producing as "The Glimmer Twins". Black and Blue showed the band blending their traditional rock and roll style with heavy influences from reggae and funk music. The only single from the album, "Fool to Cry", had moderate chart success, reaching the top 10 in the US and UK; reviews were mixed.

== Recording ==
In December 1974, the Rolling Stones returned to Musicland Studios in Munich, Germany, where they recorded It's Only Rock 'n Roll the previous winter. They began work on a new album with Mick Jagger and Keith Richards producing as the Glimmer Twins. The Rolling Stones Tour of the Americas '75 was set for that summer, and their plan was to tour in support of a new album.

As they prepared to lay tracks for "Fool to Cry" and their cover of Eric Donaldson's 1971 reggae song "Cherry Oh Baby", guitarist Mick Taylor resigned. The bombshell left the band in the lurch. According to Keith Richards, Taylor's departure shifted the focus of the recording process into "rehearsing guitar players, that's what that one was about." The Rolling Stones' various legal and corporate issues, separate lifestyles, and Richards' addiction to heroin combined with Taylor's departure to create a unit that was in serious disarray.

After a break for the holidays, the band convened in Rotterdam where they auditioned Taylor's replacement. Charlie Watts and Bill Wyman put Peter Frampton's name into the hat. Other hopefuls included Steve Marriott, Harvey Mandel, Wayne Perkins, Robert A. Johnson and Ronnie Wood. Mandel, Perkins, and Wood's guitar work appears on the finished album. As much as the band enjoyed working with all these different personalities, they shared a sense that the core unit should remain English. Wood joined the band on their summer tour and became an official member of the Rolling Stones in February 1976.

Jeff Beck went over for a jam session "just to see what was going on". Happy with his solo career, Beck joked, "in two hours I got to play three chords – I need a little more energy than that." Beck's playing with the Stones was released in the 2025 super deluxe box set.

Ian Stewart invited Rory Gallagher to audition in January 1975. Jagger loved his professionalism, and the media reported that Gallagher was the Stones' replacement for Taylor. The audition came right before Gallagher's tour of Japan. He had to leave before a decision was made. He was open to joining and assumed if the band wanted him to join they would ask. When the Rolling Stones released "Miss You", he recognized the riff as a reworking of one he had played for the band during their time in Rotterdam.

During these Rotterdam sessions, the band worked on "Memory Motel", "Hey Negrita", and "Crazy Mama", as well as an embryonic version of "Start Me Up". The only album track recorded in the Rolling Stones Mobile Studio in Rotterdam was "Melody". Given their slow progress, the band decided to put off the album's release until the following year. The compilation Made in the Shade was released as a stopgap. From the material they recorded for the new album, the only song they played on the summer tour was "Cherry Oh Baby".

In October and early November 1975, the band recorded overdubs in Montreux, Switzerland. They overdubbed more parts back at Musicland in Munich that December. Jimmy Page borrowed some of the Rolling Stones' studio time to finish his overdubs for Led Zeppelin's Presence. Black and Blue was completed in New York City at Atlantic Studios in February 1976. That month the Stones flew to Sanibel Island Beach on Sanibel Island, Florida, to be photographed by fashion photographer Hiro for the album cover art.

== Songs ==
Black and Blue runs a stylistic gamut from hard rock and funk to reggae, blues, and soft rock. "Hot Stuff" features lead guitar playing by Harvey Mandel from Canned Heat and reflects the popularity of disco at the time. The leads on "Hand of Fate" are played by Wayne Perkins, who was recommended to the Rolling Stones by Eric Clapton.

"Cherry Oh Baby" is a fairly literal cover of Eric Donaldson's reggae song. Keith Richards hands off guitar duties on "Memory Motel" to Perkins (acoustic) and Mandel (electric). He joins Mick Jagger and Billy Preston on keyboards and sings a duet with Jagger. Ron Wood is credited with inspiring "Hey Negrita", and it features him sparring with Richards.

"Melody" is derived from "Do You Love Me?", a song Billy Preston co-wrote for his 1973 album Everybody Likes Some Kind of Music. When Bill Wyman's Rhythm Kings recorded "Melody", they gave full credit to Preston instead of Jagger/Richards. On Black and Blue, Preston is merely given an "inspired by" credit. He resented the theft, which led to his estrangement from the band. "Melody" features the first audible count off on a Rolling Stones track. Preston's vocalizing is audible throughout and turns into a call and response with Jagger. The schmaltzy "Fool to Cry" was the album's only hit, but it was soporific enough to put Richards to sleep during a performance of it in 1976. "Crazy Mama" features more interplay between Richards and Wood and lays a template for the next iteration of the band.

Two extra tracks recorded in the Rotterdam sessions were later released on 1981's Tattoo You: "Slave" and "Worried About You", with a guitar solo by Wayne Perkins.

== Release and reception ==
Black and Blue was released on 23 April 1976. The lead single "Fool to Cry" became a worldwide top 10 hit. The album reached No. 2 in the UK and spent an interrupted four-week spell at number 1 in the United States, going platinum there.

=== Controversy ===
The promotional campaign involved a brutal display coordinated by Mick Jagger. He wanted an ugly model to look bruised and battered while she is bound with her legs spread above an image of the band. The image was accompanied by the tagline, "I'm Black and Blue from the Rolling Stones – and I love it!". In Jagger's view, a lot of women "want to be chained up". Atlantic Records also recorded a series of radio ads featuring a woman responding to the crack of a whip, "Ooooh, beat me, beat me, make me 'Black and Blue'...I love it." The visual campaign ran in print media and most notably on a 14x48-foot billboard on Sunset Boulevard in Hollywood.

The billboard inspired a multiyear protest by Women Against Violence Against Women (WAVAW). The billboard was removed and the radio ads were canceled, but the print ads were already in circulation. WAVAW canvassed record stores and found plenty of album art that was similarly problematic. Examples included the covers of Cold Blood's Thriller and Eric Gale's Ginseng Woman, as well as titles like Kiss' Love Gun which conflates sex with violence.

The controversy over the tasteless promotional campaign overshadowed the album's release. The label's formulaic assurances that it was not condoning violence did not satisfy WAVAW who responded with a boycott. Their pressure campaign continued until November 1979, when Atlantic's parent company, Warner Communications, Inc., issued a joint statement with WAVAW announcing a policy of screening its releases for any depictions of violence against women.

=== Critical reception ===
Professional ratings
Review scores
Source	Rating
AllMusic	3.5/5 stars
Christgau's Record Guide	A−
Encyclopedia of Popular Music	3/5 stars
The Great Rock Discography	6/10
MusicHound	3/5 stars
NME	7/10
The Rolling Stone Album Guide	3/5 stars
The Village Voice	A−
Tom Hull	B+

Black and Blue reviews were mixed, as was common for mid-career releases by established artists. Some critics liked it, others were bewildered, and several judged it inferior to Exile on Main St. (1972), which was regarded as the group's best work. The band's early 70's run included some of their most well-received work, but the middle of the decade featured much less esteemed albums. Critics were preoccupied with the band's age and frequently wondered if it was possible for men in their 30s to remain relevant to rock and roll.

If there were a critical consensus, it could be summed up by the review in Street Life, "It's another Stones' album, that's all..." Lester Bangs expounded in Creem, "the heat's off, because it's all over, they really don't matter anymore or stand for anything...this is the first meaningless Rolling Stones album, and thank God".

In NME, Charles Shaar Murray moaned, "Black and Blue is a letdown of hideous proportions, totally devoid of either the epic sense of sleazy grandeur or the galvanic bejewelled tension which are the Stones' twin ace cards." Of the sappy "Fool to Cry", he deadpanned, "Look, I know Mick and Keith used to write for Gene Pitney, but this is ridiculous." Murray did have praise for the "ultra-crisp, clean and sharp" sound the engineers created and asserted that Charlie Watts played "the best white reggae drums I've ever heard". For Circus, James Wolcott called the album a "soulless...depressing vacuum", lamenting that Keith Richards "hasn't been a vivid musical presence since Exile. And his fade into misty luminosity has made for good theater, but bad rock. He's faded grievously as a guitarist..."

Phonograph Record praised "Memory Motel" as "the most powerful piece of music The Stones have made in four years, recalling the great 'Moonlight Mile'..." In Rolling Stone, Dave Marsh concurred, musing that it would be "material [Jagger] can sing with pride until he's 50." However, Marsh felt the album's mediocrity was the result of the Glimmer Twins running too loose a production, "it took them too long to make the record, and the weariness shows."

Robert Christgau quipped, ""diagnosis: not dead by a long shot" and commended the album's musical risks. He also felt that the album represents the Stones' biggest exploration of black rhythms and styles since December's Children (1965). Barbara Charone raved for Sounds, "Make no mistake about it, Black And Blue is a great record" and the "album you've been waiting for since Exile On Main Street first appeared."

The Miami Herald remarked on its eclecticism, "Black and Blue is not a rock album. It is a sampler, of sorts, a musical term paper. In it the Stones examine the several influences on pop music today: salsa, disco, reggae. By and large, they do so superbly. But in committing themselves to exercises in musical formulae as tight as these, the Stones attach their music to styles subject to rapid eclipse."

Retrospectively, Stephen Thomas Erlewine of AllMusic praised the album for being "longer on grooves and jams than songs", which he felt was inevitable as it captured the audition process for Taylor's replacement. Uncut's Rolling Stones guide calls the album an "unlikely triumph" and "one of the Stones' most underrated albums – the only Stones LP to focus primarily on feel rather than subject matter."

The Rough Guide to Rock contributor Peter Shapiro felt the group "tried to answer LeRoi Jones's comment that white people were 'the keepers of last year's blues' by appropriating contemporary funk and reggae stylings, with mixed results." Colin Larkin of The Encyclopedia of Popular Music called it "less than impressive." Nevertheless, he ranked it #536 in his All Time Top 1000 Albums.

In The Great Rock Discography, Martin C. Strong said the album was notable for Wood's addition and "a half hearted attempt at reggae stylings". The Rolling Stone Album Guide points to "Fool to Cry" and "Memory Motel" as the album's high points.

In 1977, Keith Richards admitted the album "wasn't very good – certainly nowhere as good as Let It Bleed". Mick Taylor praised the album in a 1979 interview. In the 1990s, Mick Jagger reflected on Black and Blue, "It was a bit of a holiday period. I mean, we cared, but we didn't care as much as we had, not really concentrating on the creative process."

== Reissues ==
In 1994, Virgin Records reissued a remastered Black and Blue Collector's Edition CD, which replicated in miniature many elements of the original gatefold album packaging. In 2009, it was Universal Music's turn. Two years later, Universal Music Enterprises reissued a Japanese-only SHM-SACD version.

A super deluxe reissue of Black and Blue was released in November 2025. It features a remix of the album by Steven Wilson, unreleased jams and outtakes, and a 1976 live performance at Earls Court. The reissue includes a cover of Shirley & Company's "Shame, Shame, Shame". It originated as an outtake from the original album's recording sessions. Jagger overdubbed vocals with current Stones backup singer Chanel Haynes on the track.

Rolling Stone gave the reissue four stars out of five, selecting the three jam sessions recorded with Jeff Beck as highlights. Stephen Thomas Erlewine gave the reissue three stars out of five.

== Track listing ==
All tracks are written by Mick Jagger and Keith Richards, except "Cherry Oh Baby" written by Eric Donaldson.

Side one
No.	Title	Length
1.	"Hot Stuff"	5:21
2.	"Hand of Fate"	4:28
3.	"Cherry Oh Baby"	3:54
4.	"Memory Motel"	7:06
Total length:		20:49

Side two
No.	Title	Length
1.	"Hey Negrita" (inspiration by Ronnie Wood)	4:58
2.	"Melody" (inspiration by Billy Preston)	5:48
3.	"Fool to Cry"	5:02
4.	"Crazy Mama"	4:32
Total length:		20:20

== Personnel ==
- Track numbers noted in parentheses below are based on the CD track numbering.

The Rolling Stones

- Mick Jagger – lead vocals (all tracks), backing vocals (1, 3–5), percussion (1), piano (4), electric piano (7), electric guitar (8)
- Keith Richards – electric guitar (all but 4), backing vocals (1–5, 8), electric piano (4), bass guitar and piano (8), co-lead vocals (4)
- Ronnie Wood – electric guitar (3, 5, 8), backing vocals (1–2, 4–5, 8)
- Bill Wyman – bass guitar (all but 8), percussion (1)
- Charlie Watts – drums (all tracks), percussion (1)

Additional personnel

- Billy Preston – piano (1–2, 4–6, 8), organ (5–6), ARP String Ensemble (4), percussion (6), backing vocals (1, 4–6, 8)
- Nicky Hopkins – organ (3), piano and string synthesiser (7)
- Harvey Mandel – electric guitar (1, 4)
- Wayne Perkins – electric guitar (2, 7), acoustic guitar (4)
- Ollie E. Brown – percussion (1–2, 5, 8)
- Ian Stewart – percussion (1)
- Arif Mardin – horn arrangement (6)

Technical

- Engineers – Keith Harwood, Glyn Johns, Phil McDonald, Lew Hahn (edit)
- Assistant engineers – Jeremy Gee, Dave Richards, Tapani Tapanainen, Steve Dowd, Gene Paul
- Lee Hulko – LP mastering at Sterling Sound (original 1976)
- Robert Ludwig – CD mastering at Gateway Mastering Studios (1994 Virgin issue)
- Bea Feitler – art director
- Hiro – photograph

== Charts ==
=== Weekly charts ===
1976 weekly chart performance
Chart (1976)	Peak position
Australian Albums (Kent Music Report)	4
Austrian Albums (Ö3 Austria)	4
Canada Top Albums/CDs (RPM)	2
Dutch Albums (Album Top 100)	1
Finland (The Official Finnish Charts)	17
German Albums (Offizielle Top 100)	15
Italian Albums (Musica e Dischi)	11
Japanese Albums (Oricon)	32
New Zealand Albums (RMNZ)	4
Norwegian Albums (VG-lista)	2
Swedish Albums (Sverigetopplistan)	6
UK Albums (Official Charts)	2
US Billboard 200	1

2025 weekly chart performance
Chart (2025)	Peak position
Austrian Albums (Ö3 Austria)	3
Belgian Albums (Ultratop Flanders)	11
Belgian Albums (Ultratop Wallonia)	42
German Albums (Offizielle Top 100)	3
Greek Albums (IFPI)	25
Norwegian Physical Albums (IFPI Norge)	1
Polish Albums (ZPAV)	97
Spanish Albums (Promusicae)	53
Swiss Albums (Schweizer Hitparade)	11
UK Albums (Official Charts)	40

=== Year-end charts ===
1976 year-end chart performance
Chart (1976)	Position
Australian Albums (Kent Music Report)	21
Canada Top Albums/CDs (RPM)	19
Dutch Albums (Album Top 100)	4
New Zealand Albums (RMNZ)	9

== Certifications ==
Certifications for Black and Blue
Region	Certification	Certified units/sales
Canada (Music Canada)	Gold	50,000^{^}
France (SNEP)	Gold	100,000^{*}
United Kingdom (BPI)	Gold	100,000^{^}
^{*} Sales figures based on certification alone.^{^} Shipments figures based on certification alone.
