= Patrick Garnett =

Welsh architect

- Born: 1932; Wales
- Died: 2006 (aged 73–74)
- Occupation: Architect

Patrick Barry Garnett (11 March 1932 – 4 May 2006) was a Welsh architect, a leading member of his profession in Swinging Sixties London.

== Early life ==
Born in Rhyl, Wales, Garnett was the son of a builder. He grew up in an Art Deco house on the sea front and was educated at Rhyl Grammar School and the University of Manchester, where he met his future business partner Tony Cloughley, also a student of architecture.

== Career ==
After graduating, Garnett worked in the office of Sir Howard Robertson on the design of the Shell Centre in Lambeth, but did not stay long, setting off to join Frank Lloyd Wright's commune at Taliesin West, in Scottsdale, Arizona. Unfortunately, Wright had died by the time Garnett arrived in the U. S. He settled instead in New York, working for Carson and Lundin, then in Los Angeles, where he was with Welton Becket.

Returning to Rhyl, Garnett designed a steel and glass racetrack there. He then moved to London and in 1959 formed a partnership with his old Manchester friend, Tony Cloughley, called Garnett & Cloughley. They soon accepted a third partner, Erik Blakemore (1926–1987), an Elstree Studios film set designer, the firm becoming Garnett Cloughley Blakemore, or GCB.

After designing sets for Three Crooked Men (1958) and The Great Van Robbery (1959), Blakemore had moved on to designing the Beachcomber Bar at the May Fair Hotel, and GCB got work for Billy Butlin at his holiday camps at Bognor Regis, Barry Island, Minehead, and Skegness. It also worked for Lord Forte of Trust House Forte, designing complete holiday villages. It did domestic work on expensive flats and many projects for British Airways and the Spaghetti House.

The GCB style was greatly influenced by the Italian designer Alessandro Albrizzi, who was fond of stainless steel and glass.

At its peak, GCB employed a hundred architects and worked around the world as well as in Britain, its projects including holiday villages in Cyprus, airport lounges in Tehran, and interiors at Windsor Castle and the Palace of Westminster. Its interior for the Chelsea Drugstore can be seen in the Stanley Kubrick film A Clockwork Orange.

In 1985, Garnett left GCB to launch his own architectural practice, with offices in Covent Garden. His later work included the Trocadero Leisure Centre, Piccadilly Circus, and the refurbishment of the Turkish embassy in Belgrave Square.

== Personal life ==
On his return to Rhyl from the US, Garnett married Derry Needham, whom he had known since childhood, and they had two sons and two daughters. With success, they moved into a Georgian town house in Royal Avenue, Chelsea, and were known for their fashionable parties.

He died in May 2006.

== Notable work by GCB ==
- The Top of the Tower Restaurant in the Post Office Tower (1966)
- Albrizzi furniture showroom, Sloane Square (1968)
- Just Looking boutique, King's Road (1968)
- Chelsea Drugstore, King's Road (1968)
- New apartments in the Queen's Tower at Windsor Castle
- Interiors for the QE2 (1967–1969)
- House in Belgravia for Earl Mountbatten of Burma
- Scratchwood Services (now London Gateway services), M1 motorway(1969)
- Corley Services (1972)
