= You Gotta Move (song) =

Traditional spiritual song adapted by several artists

"You Got to Move"

Song by Mississippi Fred McDowell

from the album Vol. 2
- Released: 1965
- Recorded: Berkeley, California, July 5, 1965
- Genre: Hill country blues
- Label: Arhoolie
- Songwriter: Unknown
- Producer: Chris Strachwitz

"You Gotta Move" is a traditional African-American spiritual song. Since the 1940s, the song has been recorded by a variety of gospel musicians, usually as "You Got to Move" or "You've Got to Move". It was later popularized with blues and blues rock secular adaptations by Mississippi Fred McDowell and the Rolling Stones.

== Early gospel songs ==
The Two Gospel Keys recorded "You've Got to Move", which was released on a 78-rpm record in 1948. Emma Daniels (vocals and guitar) and Mother Sally Jones (vocals and tambourine) comprised the gospel music duo. Similar renditions followed by Elder Charles D. Beck (1949), Sister Rosetta Tharpe (1950), the Original Five Blind Boys of Alabama (1953), and the Hightower Brothers (1956).

Reverend Gary Davis recorded the song in 1962; his lyrics include:

You may run, can't be caught
You may hide, can't be found
Brother when God gets ready, you got to move

== Later renditions ==
Soul singer Sam Cooke recast the song with lyrics about a broken relationship for his 1963 album Night Beat. Cash Box described it as having "top shuffle-rhythm blues sounds". In 1965, Mississippi bluesman Fred McDowell recorded it as a slow, slide guitar hill country blues solo piece. The song generally follows a seven-bar or an eight-bar blues arrangement and has been compared to "Sitting on Top of the World". McDowell uses lyrics closer to Davis' 1962 rendition, but adds a haunting slide guitar line that doubles the vocal. A verse from the song is inscribed on his headstone:

You may be high, you may be low
You may be rich child, you may be poor
But when the Lord gets ready, you got to move

=== In Internet culture ===
McDowell's version has been used for several memes themed around racism against Black Americans, mainly in TikTok, such as the Jamal meme. Some of these memes have received criticism from several users for allegedly promoting said racism.

== The Rolling Stones version ==
"You Gotta Move"

Song by the Rolling Stones

from the album Sticky Fingers
- Released: April 23, 1971
- Recorded: 1969–1970
- Genre: Blues rock
- Length: 2:32
- Label: Rolling Stones
- Songwriters: Fred McDowell; Gary Davis
- Producer: Jimmy Miller

McDowell's rendition inspired many subsequent recordings, including a version by the Rolling Stones. The Stones regularly performed "You Gotta Move" during their 1969 US tour. They recorded a version at the Muscle Shoals Sound Studios in Alabama in December 1969, with later recording in England in 1970. It was later included on their 1971 album Sticky Fingers without a songwriter's credit. Later reissues listed the authors as McDowell and Gary Davis.

Mick Jagger sings the song in a Southern black dialect, with Mick Taylor's electric slide-guitar accompaniment. In an interview originally published in Guitar Player, Taylor said he used a Fender Telecaster for the slide part and a 12-string guitar. He explained that Keith Richards played a National guitar, though Taylor could not remember which one Richards used – the all-steel one or the "really great, beautiful guitar ... made of wood and metal".

Two different concert versions are included as bonus tracks on the group's Get Yer Ya-Ya's Out! (1970) album and another on Love You Live (1977). The latter features Billy Preston, who had played when he was 16 years old on Sam Cooke's 1963 version. (Note: Sam Cooke's Night Beat album also contains an updated "Little Red Rooster" along with "You Got to Move", both songs which the Rolling Stones later recorded closer to the original/blues versions.)

=== Personnel ===
Personnel per liner notes.

- Mick Jagger – lead vocals
- Keith Richards – electric guitar, acoustic guitar, backing vocals
- Mick Taylor – electric guitar
- Bill Wyman – electric piano
- Charlie Watts – drums

== See also ==
- African-American Vernacular English
