= If You Can't Rock Me =

Song by the Rolling Stones

from the album It's Only Rock 'n Roll
- Released: 18 October 1974
- Recorded: November 1973, May 1974
- Genre: Rock
- Length: 3:46
- Label: Rolling Stones/Virgin
- Songwriter: Jagger/Richards
- Producer: The Glimmer Twins

"If You Can't Rock Me" is a song written by Mick Jagger and Keith Richards that was first released as the opening track to the Rolling Stones 1974 album It's Only Rock 'n Roll.

== Lyrical content ==
The lyrics play off the dual meaning of the word rock, referring both to rock 'n' roll music and to sex. The song begins with lead singer Jagger singing about being on stage lusting for sex with the women in the audience. He's not looking for marriage, just to sleep with one of the women for the night. According to Rolling Stone critic Jon Landau, the refrain of "If you can't rock me somebody will" is what turns the song "into the anticipated and angry fuck song".

Other meanings are ascribed to the song as well. Music journalist James Hector suggests that the line "I think I better just sing one more song" is more telling than the band intended, noting the implication that the group was recording the song to fulfill their contractual obligations to their record company. Rolling Stones biographer Martin Elliot describes the lyrics as "bitter", suggesting that they may reflect the band's exhaustion with the rock 'n' roll lifestyle, and possibly even Jagger's own failing relationship with his wife Bianca.

== Description and critical appreciation ==
The music begins urgently, with Charlie Watts' drumming and a guitar riff from lead guitarist Mick Taylor. Sean Egan describes the song as having some energy, but feels the energy is "self-conscious". Steve Appleford claims that the energy comes primarily from Jagger's singing and Watts' drumming. Usual Rolling Stones rhythm guitarist Richards also plays bass guitar on the song, which Egan describes as "unusually brawny". Richards even has a bass solo. Appleford finds the melody to be "middling".

Allmusic critic Stephen Thomas Erlewine describes the song's "bitter cynicism" as "striking". But while Hector believes that the song has many of the ingredients for success, including a "curt riff, solid backing and a [lead] vocal buried within, as opposed to above, the sound", he feels that the song fall short of the opening songs on some of the more highly regarded Rolling Stones albums. Hector particularly blames the "uninspired" instrumental break. Hector also criticizes the lyrics as being "unmemorable" but does note their playfulness and self-referential aspect. According to Appleford, "the winding, grinding groove never quite falls into focus" and finds the riff unmemorable. For Robert Christgau, however, it was the best song on the album. Billboard to regarded it as one of the "best cuts" from the album.

"If You Can't Rock Me" has been played live on several of the Rolling Stones' tours, including in 1975, 1976, 2002 and 2003 and has been included on some of their live albums. On 1977's Love You Live, it is part of a medley with "Get Off of My Cloud". During the 2002/2003 Licks Tour, the song "tease[d]" the audience by ending with the lead-in to "Get Off of My Cloud", but the band actually went on to play "Don't Stop".
