= Tapani Talo =

Finnish-American architect (born 1950)

Tapani Talo (born Tapani Tapanainen in 1950) is a Finnish-American architect, who has also worked as an audio engineer. He is best known from Rolling Stones Mobile studio technician in early and mid 1970s.

== Career ==
Born in Lahti, Finland in 1950, he moved to Australia along his parents when he was just one year old. Family returned to Finland in late 1950s. Talo worked as a sound technician in Dipoli congress center in Otaniemi, Espoo from 1967 to 1972. At the same time he worked as a freelance photographer to various magazines and was also a DJ.

In December 1972 he went to Abbey Road studios in London and ended to work to George Martin's Associated Independent Recording studios. In February 1973 he worked as a technician at Black Sabbath European Tour concerts, from which recordings they made the live album Live at Last. In March same year he was in France to record an album for the band called Tucky Buzzard. Their producer was Bill Wyman who then hired Talo to work for the Rolling Stones Mobile studio. He worked there until 1977.

In 1974 Talo began the architect studies in London and continued them in Indiana after moving to United States in 1977. Since 2002 he has run his own studio Talo Architect (Talo Green Passive Architect) in New York.

== Recordings ==
- Black Sabbath: Live at Last (1973/1980)
- Traffic: On the Road (1973)
- The Rolling Stones: Brussels Affair (1973/2011)
- The Rolling Stones: It's Only Rock 'n Roll (1974)
- Deep Purple: Burn (1974)
- The Who: Greatest Hits Live (1974/2010)
- The Rolling Stones: Black and Blue (1976)
- Deep Purple: Made in Europe (1976)
- Led Zeppelin: Led Zeppelin DVD (1975/2003)
- Bad Company: Run with the Pack (1976)
- The Rolling Stones: Love You Live (1977)
- Rainbow: Live in Germany 1976 (1976/1990)
- Status Quo: Live! (1977)
