= Wayne Perkins =

American musician (1951–2026)

David Wayne Perkins (September 6, 1951 – March 16, 2026) was an American rock and R&B guitarist, singer, songwriter, and session musician. A 2017 feature about him on the Alabama website AL.com described him as "arguably the greatest guitarist Alabama ever produced".

Perkins may be best known for his work with the Rolling Stones, who almost brought him into the band. However, he contributed his skills to a long roster of high-profile artists, including Bob Marley and Joni Mitchell.

== Early life ==
Perkins was born in Birmingham, Alabama, on September 6, 1951 to James Milford Perkins and Jewel Earline Perkins, née Miller. He was the oldest of six children, a brother and four sisters. Both of his parents sang and played the guitar. Perkins taught himself to play at age 12.

== Music career ==
=== Early years as a session guitarist ===
At 15, Perkins played his first gig as a session musician, in Bob Grove's Prestige Recording Studio in Birmingham. At 16, he left school and started performing in local bands and released singles with a band called the Vikings with Charles Nettles.

In 1968, drummer Jasper Guarino helped Perkins land a steady job as a session guitarist in a studio owned by Quin Ivy in Muscle Shoals. Perkins was salaried at $100 a week. This led to work at Muscle Shoals Sound Studio with such names as David Porter and the Soul Children, Dave Crawford and Brad Shapiro, Dee Dee Warwick, Ronnie Milsap, Joe Cocker, Leon Russell, Jimmy Cliff, Jim Capaldi, Steve Winwood and Marlin Greene.

During his time at Muscle Shoals, Perkins was asked to join Lynyrd Skynyrd. Even though that band's lead singer, Ronnie Van Zant, was a very close friend, Perkins did not take the offer, though he came close. He later said, "They didn't need me and I had a lot of other stuff coming my way."

=== With Smith-Perkins-Smith ===
Perkins left session work to form a band called Smith-Perkins-Smith, which recorded an album released in 1972. Chris Blackwell signed the trio to Island Records and they became the label's first American act. The group toured in England with Free, as well as Fairport Convention, Argent, Uriah Heep, Audience, Family, and Vinegar Joe with Robert Palmer.

=== With the Wailers ===
While in London, Perkins had been working on the second Smith-Perkins-Smith album at Island's Basing Street recording studios when Chris Blackwell stopped him. "He said there was a Wailer project he wanted me to play on" – Catch a Fire, the 1973 album by Bob Marley and the Wailers, which went platinum. Perkins provided lead guitar overdubs on three tracks on Catch a Fire: "Concrete Jungle", "Stir It Up", and "Baby We've Got a Date". "His contributions to the pioneering LP weren't actually mentioned on the original liner notes — indeed most listeners assumed they were hearing Peter Tosh — but Perkins received credit later."

=== With Joni Mitchell ===
Mitchell's 1974 album Court and Spark has often been called a "classic" or "masterpiece." Perkins was an ingredient in the musical backdrop for her songs. Sounds magazine cited his "oh-so-beautiful guitar work" on "Car on a Hill". Perkins later recalled using James Burton's signature pink paisley Telecaster for that recording. He and Mitchell also were involved romantically for a time.

=== With Leon Russell ===
When Perkins returned to the United States, he played with Leon Russell for two years, in the Shelter People Band and The Gap Band. During this time, he became friends with superstar guitarist Eric Clapton.

=== With the Rolling Stones ===
Clapton arranged for Perkins to audition with the Rolling Stones. As a result, Perkins was one of several guitarists hired to play on the album Black and Blue. The credits for the album list Perkins appearing on three tracks: "Hand of Fate" (which includes his guitar solo), "Memory Motel", and "Fool to Cry". "Worried About You" (also including a guitar solo) was also recorded during these sessions but was not released until 1981 on Tattoo You. A super deluxe reissue of Black and Blue was released in November 2025, containing the outtake "I Love Ladies", featuring Wayne Perkins.

In his memoir Life (2010), Keith Richards said that Perkins was very nearly asked to replace Mick Taylor in the Stones. "We liked Perkins a lot. He was a lovely player [but] it wasn't so much the playing, when it came down to it. It came down to the fact that Ronnie (Ron Wood) was English!"

=== Subsequent endeavors ===
Following this, Perkins joined the Alabama Power Band (formed by his brother Dale), which became Crimson Tide and recorded two albums.

In Nashville, Perkins wrote music for Catdaddy Music and co-wrote soundtracks with Emmy Award winning composer/producer/remixer Richard Wolf for films including The Karate Kid Part II and Back to School (both 1986).

Perkins later formed the band Problem Child with Robert Nix and Rick Christian, and played bass with Lonnie Mack.

During his long career, Perkins played session guitar with artists including Leon Russell, Joe Cocker, Steve Winwood, Jim Capaldi, David Porter, Ben Atkins, the Alabama State Troupers, Michael Bolton, Angela Bofill, the Everly Brothers, the Oak Ridge Boys, Billy Ray Cyrus, Ray Reach and many others. In 1995, Perkins recorded his first solo album, Mendo Hotel. In 2005, he released his latest, Ramblin' Heart.

== Later life and death ==
In the mid-2000s, Wayne Perkins was diagnosed with multiple brain tumors. He was treated, but continued to occasionally suffer from severe headaches. He retired to Argo, Alabama, where he lived with his brother.

Perkins suffered a stroke on March 1, 2026, and died in Argo on March 16, at the age of 74.

== Discography ==
- 1971 Hills of Indiana Lonnie Mack; Living by the Days Don Nix; Lovejoy Albert King; Mary Called Jeanie Greene; Ronnie Milsap Ronnie Milsap
- 1972 Alabama State Troupers Road Show Alabama State Troupers; Dinnertime Alex Taylor; Catch a Fire Bob Marley & The Wailers; John David Souther John David Souther; Raised on Records P.F. Sloan; Smith Perkins Smith Smith Perkins Smith; Smokestack Lighting Mike Harrison; Stories We Could Tell the Everly Brothers; Tiptoe Past the Dragon Marlin Greene
- 1973 Catch a Fire, Bob Marley and the Wailers. Lead guitar overdubs on "Concrete Jungle", "Stir It Up", and "Baby We've Got a Date"; Last Stage for Silverworld Kenny Young; October Claire Hamill
- 1974 Court and Spark, Joni Mitchell; Hobos Heroes & Street Corner Clowns Don Nix; Monkey Grip, Bill Wyman
- 1975 Michael Bolotin, Michael Bolton (released under Bolton's birth name)
- 1976 As Long as You Love Me, Mickey Thomas; Black and Blue, the Rolling Stones; Diggin' It, Dunn & Rubini; Glass Heart, Allan Rich
- 1978 Levon Helm Levon Helm; Skynyrd's First and...Last Lynyrd Skynyrd
- 1979 Next Song Is... Keith Herman
- 1980 I Had to Say It Millie Jackson; McGuinn-Hillman Roger McGuinn with Chris Hillman; Storm Windows John Prine
- 1981 Gimme You Billy Burnette; Mean Streets McGuinn & Hillman; Plain from the Heart Delbert McClinton; Reunion Jerry Jeff Walker; Tattoo You The Rolling Stones
- 1982 Night After Night Steve Cropper; No Fun Aloud Glenn Frey; Old Enough Lou Ann Barton
- 1983 American Made The Oak Ridge Boys; E.S.P. (Extra Sexual Persuasion) Millie Jackson
- 1984 Greatest Hits, Vol. 2 The Oak Ridge Boys
- 1985 Home Again The Everly Brothers; Step on Out The Oak Ridge Boys
- 1986 Back to School Original Soundtrack
- 1991 Early Years Michael Bolton; Loner Prince Phillip Mitchell
- 1992 Songs of Freedom Bob Marley & The Wailers
- 1993 Mr. President Ray Reach and Various Artists. A song, produced by Ray Reach, performed by Alabama talent, benefitting the homeless in the Birmingham, Alabama area. Artists and studios who donated their time and efforts to make this record include: choral students from Jefferson County schools, Chuck Leavell (Keyboards), Charlie Hayward (Bass), Chuck Tilley (Drums), Kelley O'Nell (Saxophone), Wayne Perkins (Guitar), Front Row Productions and Airwave Productions Group.
- 1993 Jump Back: The Best of the Rolling Stones 1971–1993 The Rolling Stones; Ultimate Collection Albert King
- 1994 Classics, Vol. 2: Plain from the Heart Delbert McClinton; Classics, Volume 1 Delbert McClinton; Heartaches & Harmonies [Box Set] The Everly Brothers
- 1995 Mendo Hotel Wayne Perkins; Soul Children – Best of Two Worlds The Soul Children
- 1996 So I Can Love You-Untouched The Emotions
- 1997 Count On Me James Clark, Produced by Ray Reach
- 1998 At Home in Muscle Shoals Bobby Womack; House Rent Party Various Artists; Skynyrd's First: The Complete Muscle Shoals Album Lynyrd Skynyrd
- 2001 Catch a Fire [Bonus Tracks] Bob Marley & The Wailers; Catch a Fire [Deluxe Edition] Bob Marley & The Wailers; Jealous Kind/Plain from the Heart Delbert McClinton
- 2002 Forty Licks The Rolling Stones; Patchouli Ben Atkins
- 2003 Babylon by Bus/Catch a Fire/Burnin' [Deluxe Editions] Bob Marley; Rockin' Memphis: 1960s-1970s, Vol. 1 Various Artists; Thyrty: The 30th Anniversary Collection Lynyrd Skynyrd; Uprising/Kaya/Catch a Fire [Deluxe Editions] Bob Marley; Every Little Lie Ken Valdez
- 2005 Even More Good Whiskey: A Collection of Contemporary Various Artists; Greatest Hits Lynyrd Skynyrd; Levon Helm [Bonus Track] Levon Helm; Ramblin' Heart Wayne Perkins
- 2006 Monkey Grip [Bonus Tracks] Bill Wyman; Ronnie Milsap [Bonus Track] Ronnie Milsap; Stax Profiles Albert King
