= Keith Harwood =

British audio engineer (1950–1977)

Keith Harwood (1950 – September 3, 1977) was a British recording engineer, most notable for his work at Olympic Studios with such musicians as David Bowie (on Diamond Dogs in 1974), the Pretty Things and Ron Wood. Harwood collaborated on engineering the Rolling Stones albums It's Only Rock 'n' Roll (1974) and Black and Blue (1976) with brothers Andy and Glyn Johns, respectively. He also engineered a number of Led Zeppelin albums, including Houses of the Holy (1973), Physical Graffiti (1975) and Presence (1976).

In 1977, Harwood was on his way home from Mick Jagger's Home Studio Stargroves in Hampshire when due to exhaustion, lost control of his car on the M4. He was killed after hitting a bridge near the Slough West exit. Confirmed by family members and close friends of his, one of whom worked with Keith at Olympic Studios and saw Keith's car being loaded onto a truck as he passed the accident scene. The Rolling Stones dedicated Love You Live to the memory of Harwood.
