= Rewind (1971–1984) =

Greatest hits album by the Rolling Stones
- Released: 25 June 1984
- Recorded: December 1969 – August 1983
- Genre: Rock
- Length: 55:33 (US), 53:12 (UK)
- Label: Rolling Stones/EMI
- Producer: Jimmy Miller, the Glimmer Twins, and Chris Kimsey

The Rolling Stones chronology
| Undercover (1983) | Rewind (1971–1984) (1984) | Dirty Work (1986) |

Singles from Rewind
- 1. "Brown Sugar" Released: 2 July 1984

Rewind (1971–1984) is a compilation album by English rock band the Rolling Stones, released in 1984. Coming only three years after Sucking in the Seventies, the album was primarily compiled to mark the end of the band's alliance with Warner Music (in North America) and EMI (all other territories), both of whom were the distributors of Rolling Stones Records. It is the second Rolling Stones album to include a lyric sheet (after 1978's Some Girls).

For the first time since 1969's Through the Past, Darkly (Big Hits Vol. 2), the UK and US editions of Rewind (1971–1984) would each feature different track listings, reflecting the individual tastes of both territories. The American CD version featured the US top 20 hits from 1971 to 1983, with the exception of "Ain't Too Proud to Beg".

Released in the summer of 1984, Rewind (1971–1984) was not as successful as previous compilations, reaching No. 23 in the UK and No. 86 in the US, though it went gold in the latter. The album marked the first official Rolling Stones CD release in the United States and featured the additional tracks "It's Only Rock'n Roll (But I Like It)" and "Doo Doo Doo Doo Doo (Heartbreaker)". The compilation was accompanied by a home video release, Video Rewind, released 14 November 1984.

With later compilations Jump Back: The Best of The Rolling Stones (1993) and Forty Licks (2002) superseding it, Rewind (1971–1984) eventually fell out of print.

Professional ratings
Review scores
| Source | Rating |
|---|---|
| AllMusic | 3/5 stars |
| Christgau's Record Guide: The '80s | A− |
| Tom Hull – on the Web | A− |

== UK track listing ==
All songs by Mick Jagger and Keith Richards.

1. "Brown Sugar" – 3:49
2. "Undercover of the Night" – 4:32
3. "Start Me Up" – 3:31
4. "Tumbling Dice" – 3:37
5. "It's Only Rock 'n Roll (But I Like It)" – 5:07
6. "She's So Cold" – 4:11
7. "Miss You" – 4:48
8. "Beast of Burden" – 4:27
9. "Fool to Cry" – 5:06
10. "Waiting on a Friend" – 4:34
11. "Angie" – 4:31
12. "Respectable" – 3:07
- On the 1986 CD release, "Hang Fire" replaced "She's So Cold", while "Emotional Rescue" and "Doo Doo Doo Doo Doo (Heartbreaker)" were added.

== US track listing ==
1. "Miss You" – 4:48
2. "Brown Sugar" – 3:49
3. "Undercover of the Night" – 4:31
4. "Start Me Up" – 3:31
5. "Tumbling Dice" – 3:37
6. "Hang Fire" – 2:21
7. "Emotional Rescue" – 5:40
8. "Beast of Burden" – 4:27
9. "Fool to Cry" – 5:05
10. "Waiting On a Friend" – 4:34
11. "Angie" – 4:31
- "It's Only Rock 'n Roll (But I Like It)" and "Doo Doo Doo Doo Doo (Heartbreaker)" were added to the CD and cassette releases.

== Chart positions ==
Album

| Year | Chart | Position |
|---|---|---|
| 1984 1990 | UK Albums Chart | 23 |
| 1984 | Billboard 200 | 86 |

== Certification ==
| Region | Certification | Certified units/sales |
|---|---|---|
| Netherlands (NVPI) | Gold | 50,000^{^} |
| United States (RIAA) | Gold | 500,000^{^} |
^{^} Shipments figures based on certification alone.

Singles

| Year | Single | Chart | Position |
|---|---|---|---|
| 1984 | "Brown Sugar" | UK Singles Chart | 58 |
