= Video Rewind =

- Directed by: Julien Temple
- Starring: Bill Wyman; Mick Jagger
- Music by: The Rolling Stones
- Release date: 1984
- Language: English

Video Rewind is a compilation of video clips by English rock band the Rolling Stones, recorded between 1972–1984. Instead of presenting unrelated clips and videos strung together, it uses a framing story directed by Julien Temple, featuring Bill Wyman and Mick Jagger, and also includes some footage directed by Michael Lindsay-Hogg. It was first released in 1984 on the VHS, Betamax, Laserdisc, and CED Videodisc formats by Vestron home video.

== Framing footage ==
The video starts with Bill Wyman—who conceived and developed the compilation—in a guard's uniform, making his way through the British Museum, until he reaches a buried storage room with the label, "Exhibit of Ancient Antiquities". He gains entrance with an American Express Gold Card. Inside the room is a plethora of rock memorabilia. Wyman walks through, making comments on some of the items: "A Gary Glitter chest wig... authentic!". On seeing a c.1965 Paul McCartney jacket with an MBE on it, he comments, "They never did give us one of these, did they?", and takes it from the jacket. He sits down at a computer terminal and pulls up the first video. After the first video, he remembers that something might be in the room. He pulls a cloth off an exhibit, which is Jagger in suspended animation, wearing a c.1973 stage outfit. Wyman wakes Jagger up and they go through the exhibit, "playing" videos on such things as a microwave oven and an old TV, but mostly on Wyman's stylized computer, making pithy comments all throughout.

MICK: "Bill, you ever try and sleep in the same room as Keith?"
BILL: "No... but I've tried to sleep in the same hotel as him!"

The piece ends with real museum guards crashing through the locked door and carrying Wyman off, Jagger still in the exhibit glass. The image fades to Wyman being woken up by Jagger backstage, as it's time to go on. However, Wyman now has an MBE on his jacket.

== Track listing ==
- "Midnight Rambler" – from Cocksucker Blues (1972) movie, excerpt only
1. "She Was Hot" – promo, 1984
2. "She's So Cold" – promo, 1980
3. "Emotional Rescue" – mix of both promos, 1980
4. "Waiting on a Friend" – promo, 1981
  - interview with Keith Richards (Norman Gunston Show, Australian TV, 1978)
  - "(I Can't Get No) Satisfaction" – Hampton 18/12/81, excerpt only
5. "Angie" – promo, 1973 (version 1, with Mick Jagger sitting)
6. "Brown Sugar" – live mix 1972/76/81
  - footage from Cocksucker Blues
7. "Neighbors" – promo, 1981
8. "Too Much Blood" – promo, 1984
9. "It's Only Rock 'n Roll (But I Like It)" – promo, 1974
  - interviews with Charlie Watts, Keith Richards and Ronnie Wood (20/20, US TV, 1978)
10. "Miss You" – promo, 1978, excerpt only
11. "Undercover of the Night" – promo, 1983 (version 2)
12. "Start Me Up" – live mix 1981/82 (f.e. Hampton '81, Leeds '82)

Extras

  - Interview with Mick Jagger after show in Memphis ‘78 (Norman Gunston Show, 1978)
  - Short footage from through the years
