= Undercover (Rolling Stones album) =

Studio album by the Rolling Stones
- Released: 7 November 1983
- Recorded: November 1982 – August 1983
- Studios: Pathé Marconi (Boulogne Billancourt); Compass Point (Nassau, Bahamas); Hit Factory (New York, New York)
- Genres: Rock and roll; hard rock; new wave
- Length: 44:46
- Label: Rolling Stones
- Producers: The Glimmer Twins, Chris Kimsey

The Rolling Stones chronology
Still Life (American Concert 1981) (1982)	Undercover (1983)	Rewind (1971–1984) (1984)

The Rolling Stones studio album chronology
Tattoo You (1981)	Undercover (1983)	Dirty Work (1986)

Singles from Undercover
- 1. "Undercover of the Night" Released: 31 October 1983; 2. "She Was Hot" Released: 23 January 1984; 3. "Too Much Blood" Released: December 1984 (US)

Undercover is the seventeenth studio album by the English rock band the Rolling Stones, released on 7 November 1983 by Rolling Stones Records. The band would move the label to Columbia Records for its follow-up, 1986's Dirty Work.

After the band's preceding studio album Tattoo You (1981) was mostly patched together from a selection of outtakes, Undercover was their first release of all-new recordings in the 1980s. Tensions in the studio were high, as each of the principal songwriters wanted to take the band in a different direction. Vocalist Mick Jagger sought to adapt to modern trends in music, favouring reggae, worldbeat, and new wave musical textures, while guitarist Keith Richards wanted the band to return to their blues rock roots. As a result, the album is an eclectic collection of songs covering a wide range of styles. Besides the other principal band members, including guitarist Ronnie Wood, bassist Bill Wyman, and drummer Charlie Watts, the album featured many guest musicians. It would be the last album released during the lifetime of Ian Stewart, a former member of the band and frequent contributor on piano.

It would be the first Rolling Stones album in more than a decade to miss reaching No. 1 on the US albums chart, peaking at No. 4. Three singles were released from the album, with the highest-charting being top-40 release "Undercover of the Night".

== History ==
Due to the recent advancements in recording technology, Mick Jagger and Keith Richards were officially joined in the producer's seat by Chris Kimsey, the first outside producer the Stones had used since Jimmy Miller. They began recording at the Pathé Marconi Studios in Paris, France in November 1982. After breaking for the Christmas holidays, they completed the album in New York City the following summer.

The making of Undercover was an arduous process, largely because Jagger and Richards' famous mid-1980s row began during these sessions. Jagger was keenly aware of new styles and wanted to keep The Rolling Stones current and experimental, while Richards was seemingly more focused on the band's rock and blues roots. As a result, there was friction, and the tension between the two key members would increase over the coming years. A compounding factor was that Richards had emerged (to an extent) from his self-destructive lifestyle of the previous decade, and thus sought a more active role in the creative direction of the band, much to the chagrin of Jagger, who had enjoyed nearly a decade in relative control of the band.

The lyrics on Undercover are among Jagger's most macabre, with much grisly imagery to be found in the lead single and top 10 hit "Undercover of the Night", a rare political track about Central America, as well as "Tie You Up (The Pain of Love)" and "Too Much Blood", Jagger's attempt to incorporate contemporary trends in dance music.

Musically, Undercover appears to duel between hard rock, reggae and new wave, reflecting the leadership tug of war between Jagger and Richards at the time. "Pretty Beat Up" is largely a Ronnie Wood composition, and Jagger and Richards were both reportedly reluctant to include it on the album.

"Think I'm Going Mad" was a track first recorded during the Emotional Rescue sessions of 1979 and appeared as the B-side to the "She Was Hot" single. It was not included on the Rarities 1971–2003 collection and was finally released on CD on the Singles 1971–2006 box set compilation.

== Release and reception ==
Professional ratings
Review scores
Source	Rating
AllMusic	3.5/5 stars
Blender	4/5 stars
Christgau's Record Guide	C+
Tom Hull	B
MusicHound	2/5 stars
The Rolling Stone Album Guide	3/5 stars

Undercover was released in November 1983, reaching No. 3 in the UK and No. 4 in the United States. It was a relative disappointment, however, breaking a streak of eight No. 1 albums (excluding compilations and live albums) in the United States and failing to spawn any huge singles.

Undercover was the fourth consecutive Rolling Stones album to have its art direction handled by Peter Corriston (who had won a Grammy for his work on Tattoo You), with concept origination, photography and illustration by Hubert Kretzschmar. The album's cover artwork was covered with real peel-off stickers on the original vinyl edition, which when removed revealed other patterned geometric shapes.

Contemporary critical reception to the album was mixed. In a review in Rolling Stone, Kurt Loder gave the album 4.5 stars, calling it "rock & roll without apologies". Loder also considered it "so vibrantly crafted that some of the songs might pass as outtakes from Between the Buttons or some similar primordial classic," leaving the band "still at the top of their class (admittedly, it's a class of one)". Billboard was also positive, calling Undercover one of the band's "most musically adventurous" albums, a "quintessential" Stones record and one that would reward repeated listens. On the other hand, Robert Christgau called it a "murky, overblown, incoherent piece of shit" and labelled it the band's "worst studio album".

Many fans have come to regard the album as among the Stones' weaker releases, a view echoed by Jagger himself in later interviews. Some later reviews have attributed the album's eclecticism and nastiness to the Jagger/Richards feud.

== Legacy ==
Undercover was the last Rolling Stones album distributed in North America via Rolling Stones Records' original distribution deal with Warner Music Group's Atlantic Records subsidiary. The album would be reissued in 1986 by CBS/Sony Music following the Stones' signing to that label. Undercover was subsequently remastered and reissued by Virgin Records in 1994, and again in 2009 by Universal Music. It was released on SHM-SACD in 2012 by Universal Music Japan.

Original cassettes and later CD reissues (post-EMI) of this album contain a different edit of "Wanna Hold You" from what appeared on the original vinyl release. The original cassette release includes the verse "You sure look good to me, so what's it gonna be, it's up to you to choose, I'll make you an offer you can't refuse". This version runs 3:50.

== Track listing ==
All tracks are written by Mick Jagger and Keith Richards, except "Pretty Beat Up", written by Jagger, Richards and Ronnie Wood.

Side one
No.	Title	Length
1.	"Undercover of the Night"	4:31
2.	"She Was Hot"	4:40
3.	"Tie You Up (The Pain of Love)"	4:16
4.	"Wanna Hold You"	3:52
5.	"Feel on Baby"	5:03

Side two
No.	Title	Length
1.	"Too Much Blood"	6:14
2.	"Pretty Beat Up"	4:03
3.	"Too Tough"	3:52
4.	"All the Way Down"	3:12
5.	"It Must Be Hell"	5:03

=== Other songs ===
Title	Length	Notes
"I Think I'm Going Mad"	4:17	"She Was Hot" B-side

== Personnel ==
Adapted from Undercover liner notes.

The Rolling Stones

- Mick Jagger – lead vocals, rhythm guitar, harmonica
- Keith Richards – rhythm and lead guitar, backing vocals; lead vocals on "Wanna Hold You"; bass guitar on "Pretty Beat Up"
- Ronnie Wood – rhythm and lead guitar, backing vocals; bass guitar on "Tie You Up" and "Wanna Hold You"
- Bill Wyman – bass guitar, percussion; Yamaha piano on "Pretty Beat Up"
- Charlie Watts – drums

Additional personnel

- Chuck Leavell – keyboards
- Ian Stewart – piano on "She Was Hot" and "Pretty Beat Up", percussion
- David Sanborn – saxophone
- CHOPS – horns
- Sly Dunbar – percussion
- Moustapha Cissé – percussion
- Ibrahima Coundoul – percussion
- Martin Ditcham – percussion
- Jim Barber – additional guitar on "Too Much Blood"

Technical

- Hubert Kretzschmar – cover art photographer and illustrator
- Peter Corriston – cover art designer
- Bob Clearmountain – mixing engineer

== Charts ==
=== Weekly charts ===
1983–1984 weekly chart performance for Undercover
Chart (1983–1984)	Peak position
Australian Albums (Kent Music Report)	3
Austrian Albums (Ö3 Austria)	8
Canada Top Albums/CDs (RPM)	2
Dutch Albums (Album Top 100)	1
Finland (The Official Finnish Charts)	4
French Albums (SNEP)	11
German Albums (Offizielle Top 100)	2
Italian Albums (Musica e Dischi)	10
Japanese Albums (Oricon)	12
New Zealand Albums (RMNZ)	2
Norwegian Albums (VG-lista)	3
Spanish Albums (PROMUSICAE)	5
Swedish Albums (Sverigetopplistan)	1
Swiss Albums (Schweizer Hitparade)	5
UK Albums (Official Charts)	3
US Billboard 200	4

=== Year-end charts ===
1983 year-end chart performance for Undercover
Chart (1983)	Position
Australian Albums (Kent Music Report)	73
Canada Top Albums/CDs (RPM)	45
Dutch Albums (Album Top 100)	29
French Albums (SNEP)	87

1984 year-end chart performance for Undercover
Chart (1984)	Position
Australian Albums (Kent Music Report)	87
Canada Top Albums/CDs (RPM)	33
Dutch Albums (Album Top 100)	93

== Certifications ==
Certifications for Undercover
Region	Certification	Certified units/sales
Japan (RIAJ)	Gold	100,000^{^}
Spain (Promusicae)	Gold	50,000^{^}
Sweden (GLF)	Gold	50,000^{^}
United Kingdom (BPI)	Gold	100,000^{^}
United States (RIAA)	Platinum	1,000,000^{^}
Yugoslavia	—	41,069
^{^} Shipments figures based on certification alone.
