= Sleep Tonight =

Song by the Rolling Stones

from the album Dirty Work
- Released: 24 March 1986
- Recorded: 1985
- Genre: Rock
- Length: 5:11
- Label: Rolling Stones/Virgin
- Songwriter(s): Jagger/Richards
- Producer(s): Steve Lillywhite, the Glimmer Twins

"Sleep Tonight" is a song by the Rolling Stones, from their 1986 album Dirty Work. It is the second song on the ten-track album where lead vocals are performed by Keith Richards, "Too Rude" being the first. This was the first time two songs sung by Richards appeared on a Rolling Stones album.

Richards wrote the song (credited as a Jagger/Richards composition) on piano in the Paris recording studio's control room. Ronnie Wood liked the developing song and they recorded it together unaccompanied. Wood played drums, since Charlie Watts was not present for the session, and Watts later said "he could not have done better. Richards plays all guitars, bass and piano, as well as lead and backing vocals, aided by Bobby Womack and Don Covay.

Richards has stated that his singing during the Dirty Work sessions "thickened up" his voice: Since Jagger was absent from the studio much of the time, Richards provided guide vocals for many tracks and learned new microphone techniques. His sturdy but smokey vocal presence on "Sleep Tonight" foreshadows the strong and emotive singing on his solo records and later Rolling Stones tracks.

== The song ==
"Sleep Tonight" is a piano-driven ballad, with a restrained string arrangement (played on a synthesizer), a heavy drum beat and a gospel-like vocal arrangement. The song shows a maturing musician and songwriter, and is a bridge between the younger Richards "outlaw" songs and the soulful ballads he became known for on later Rolling Stones records like "Slipping Away" (Steel Wheels), "The Worst" and "Thru and Thru" (Voodoo Lounge), "How Can I Stop" (Bridges to Babylon) and "Losing My Touch" (Forty Licks).
