= Dirty Work (Rolling Stones album) =

Studio album by the Rolling Stones
- Released: 24 March 1986
- Recorded: 5 April – 17 June and 16 July – 17 August 1985
- Studios: Pathé Marconi, Boulogne Billancourt; RPM & Right Track (NYC)
- Genres: Blues rock; rock and roll; reggae
- Length: 40:03
- Labels: Rolling Stones, Columbia
- Producers: Steve Lillywhite, The Glimmer Twins

The Rolling Stones chronology
| Rewind (1971–1984) (1984) | Dirty Work (1986) | Steel Wheels (1989) |

The Rolling Stones studio album chronology
| Undercover (1983) | Dirty Work (1986) | Steel Wheels (1989) |

Singles from Dirty Work
- 1. "Harlem Shuffle" Released: 3 March 1986; 2. "One Hit (To the Body)" Released: 9 May 1986

Dirty Work is the eighteenth studio album by the English rock band the Rolling Stones. It was released on 24 March 1986 on the Rolling Stones label by CBS Records, their first under their new contract with Columbia Records. Produced by Steve Lillywhite, the album was recorded during a period when relations between Mick Jagger and Keith Richards had soured considerably, according to Richards' autobiography Life.

The album was recorded during a time of turmoil for the band, as its two principal songwriters, Richards and Jagger, had been feuding over the band's direction during most of the 1980s. Almost all of the band members had spent the previous few years working on solo albums or side projects. Some band members, including guitarist Ronnie Wood, drummer Charlie Watts and bassist Bill Wyman, were often absent from the studio during recording sessions; it was rare that all five principal members were together at the same time. It would be the last album to feature former member and frequent piano contributor Ian Stewart, who died shortly before the album's release. As a result, a number of guest musicians appeared on the album, including guitarists Jimmy Page and Bobby Womack. Keyboards were played by Ivan Neville and Chuck Leavell, who would remain with the band for decades. Unlike most Stones albums, there was no supporting tour, as the level of animosity among band members prevented them from being able to work together live onstage.

Dirty Work sold well, reaching platinum or gold status in several countries, including the United States, Canada and the UK, and peaking as a top-10-charting album in over a dozen markets. The album spawned two top-40 hits: a cover of Bob & Earl's song "Harlem Shuffle" and one of the songs written with Ronnie Wood, "One Hit (To the Body)". However, the album was a critical flop, with most critics then and now finding it uneven and uninspired, many reviewers citing the tensions within the band at the time.

== Recording ==
The sessions for Dirty Work, the first album under the Rolling Stones' distribution contract with CBS Records, began in April 1985 in Boulogne Billancourt, running for two months before breaking for a short spell. Mick Jagger had just released his first solo album, She's the Boss (1985), much to Richards' annoyance, since Richards' first priority was the Rolling Stones and he was stung that Jagger was pursuing a career as a pop star. Jagger was absent from many of the Dirty Work sessions while Richards recorded instrumental parts with Ronnie Wood, Bill Wyman and Charlie Watts. As a result, Dirty Work is the first album since Let It Bleed (1969) not to feature any guitar playing from Jagger, who instead recorded vocals at a later time. The divide between Jagger and Richards was on public view on 13 July 1985, when Jagger performed a solo set at Live Aid while Richards and Wood supported Bob Dylan's set on acoustic guitars.

Charlie Watts' involvement in the recording sessions was also limited; in 1994 Watts told Ed Bradley on 60 Minutes that during the 1980s he had been addicted to heroin and alcohol. Steve Jordan and Anton Fig play drums on some tracks; Ronnie Wood plays drums on "Sleep Tonight". Jagger would later cite Watts' personal state as one of the reasons he vetoed a tour in support of Dirty Work in 1986, preferring to start work on his second solo album, Primitive Cool (1987).

Four of the album's eight original compositions are credited to Jagger/Richards/Wood and one to Jagger/Richards/Chuck Leavell. Only three are credited to Jagger/Richards, the lowest number on any Rolling Stones album since Out of Our Heads (1965). Dirty Work is the first Rolling Stones album to feature two tracks with Richards on lead vocals ("Too Rude" and "Sleep Tonight").

Following a further month of final recording in July and August 1985 (which saw guest appearances by Jimmy Page, Bobby Womack and Tom Waits), co-producer Steve Lillywhite supervised several weeks of mixing and the creation of 12-inch remixes. On 12 December, Ian Stewart, one of the Stones' founding members and their longtime pianist and road manager, died of a sudden heart attack at the age of 47. As a tribute, a hidden track of Stewart playing Big Bill Broonzy's "Key to the Highway" was added to close the album.

== Artwork and packaging ==
The original vinyl release of Dirty Work came shrinkwrapped in dark red cellophane. Breaking with Rolling Stones tradition, Dirty Work was the first of their studio albums to contain a lyric sheet in the United States, apparently at the insistence of then-distributor CBS Records. Also included was a comic strip, drawn by Mark Marek, called "Dirty Workout".

In 2005, Pitchfork included the album cover in their list of "The Worst Record Covers of All Time", with Brent DiCrescenzo saying that no other cover "goes so far to completely tarnish the reputation of a Valhalla-ensconced band while demonstrating the crushing awfulness of 1980s aesthetics".

== Release and reception ==
Professional ratings
Review scores
| Source | Rating |
|---|---|
| AllMusic | 3/5 stars |
| Christgau's Record Guide | A |
| MusicHound Rock | 2.5/5 stars |
| The Rolling Stone Album Guide | 4/5 stars |
| Tom Hull – on the Web | A− |
| Uncut | 3/5 stars |

In March 1986, the Rolling Stones' cover of "Harlem Shuffle" (the first lead single from a Stones studio album not to be a Jagger/Richards original since the band's earliest days) was released to a receptive audience, reaching No. 13 in the UK and No. 5 in the United States. The follow-up single "One Hit (To the Body)" was a US top-30 hit and featured a revealing video of Jagger and Richards seeming to trade blows (although Richards is syncing to Jimmy Page, who played lead guitar on the song).

Dirty Work was released three weeks after "Harlem Shuffle", reaching No. 4 in the UK and United States (going platinum there), but the critical reaction was less than enthusiastic. Some reviewers felt the album was slight in places, with weak, generic songwriting from Richards and Wood and puzzlingly abrasive vocals from Jagger. Some felt Jagger was saving his best material for his solo records, though the critical reaction to those releases was muted as well. People named it one of the worst albums of 1986, denoting "The worst fears of the Baby Boomers come true: If the Stones are sounding this old and tired, what does it say about their original fans?"

However, at the same time, Robert Christgau called Dirty Work "a bracing and even challenging record [which] innovates without kowtowing to multi-platinum fashion or half-assed pretension. It's honest and makes you like it." In 2004, Stylus Magazine's "On Second Thoughts" feature assessed the album as "a tattered, embarrassed triumph, by far the most interesting Stones album since Some Girls at every level: lyrical, conceptual, instrumental" and claiming that the album features "the most venomous guitar sound of the Stones' career, and Jagger's most committed vocals."

Richards said that songs on the album were structured to be played live with a view to tour in support of the album, before Jagger decided he was not going to tour after all, though Jagger later cited his concerns about Watts's health for not doing so. The only songs from Dirty Work to be played live have been "One Hit (To the Body)" and "Harlem Shuffle", both performed on the Steel Wheels tour.

In 1994 Dirty Work was remastered and reissued by Virgin Records, and again in 2009 by Universal Music. It was released on SHM-SACD in 2011 by Universal Music Japan.

== Track listing ==
Side one
| No. | Title | Writer(s) | Length |
|---|---|---|---|
| 1. | "One Hit (To the Body)" | Mick Jagger, Keith Richards, Ronnie Wood | 4:44 |
| 2. | "Fight" | Jagger, Richards, Wood | 3:09 |
| 3. | "Harlem Shuffle" | Bob Relf, Ernest Nelson | 3:23 |
| 4. | "Hold Back" | Jagger, Richards | 3:53 |
| 5. | "Too Rude" | Lindon Roberts | 3:11 |

Side two
| No. | Title | Writer(s) | Length |
|---|---|---|---|
| 1. | "Winning Ugly" | Jagger, Richards | 4:32 |
| 2. | "Back to Zero" | Jagger, Richards, Chuck Leavell | 4:00 |
| 3. | "Dirty Work" | Jagger, Richards, Wood | 3:53 |
| 4. | "Had It with You" | Jagger, Richards, Wood | 3:19 |
| 5. | "Sleep Tonight" (includes hidden track (Note: "Sleep Tonight" includes a short hidden track excerpt of "Key to the Highway" (0:33) written by Big Bill Broonzy, Charles Segar. Digital releases include the song as a distinct track 11.)) | Jagger, Richards | 5:10 |

== Personnel ==
The Rolling Stones

- Mick Jagger – lead and backing vocals, harmonica
- Keith Richards – electric and acoustic guitars, piano, backing vocals; lead vocals on "Too Rude" and "Sleep Tonight"
- Ronnie Wood – electric, acoustic and pedal steel guitar, bass guitar, tenor saxophone, backing vocals; drums on "Too Rude" and "Sleep Tonight"
- Bill Wyman – bass guitar, synthesizer
- Charlie Watts – drums

Additional personnel

- Chuck Leavell – keyboards
- Ivan Neville – backing vocals, bass guitar, organ, synthesizer
- Jimmy Page – lead electric guitar on "One Hit (To the Body)"
- Bobby Womack – backing vocals, electric guitar on "Back to Zero"
- Philippe Saisse – keyboards
- Anton Fig – drums, shakers
- Steve Jordan – drums
- John Regan – bass guitar on "Winning Ugly"
- Dan Collette – trumpet
- Ian Stewart – piano on "Key to the Highway"
- Marku Ribas – percussion
- Jimmy Cliff, Don Covay, Beverly D'Angelo, Kirsty MacColl, Dolette McDonald, Janice Pendarvis, Patti Scialfa and Tom Waits – backing vocals

Production

- Engineered by Dave Jerden
- Additional engineer – Steve Parker
- Assistant engineers – Tom Crich, Mike Krowiak
- Recorded at Pathe Marconi Studios Paris
- Mixed at R.P.M. and Right Track Studios N.Y.C.
- Art direction and package design – Janet Perr
- Art direction and photography – Annie Leibovitz
- Inner sleeve artwork – Mark Marek

== Charts ==
=== Weekly charts ===
Weekly chart performance for Dirty Work
| Chart (1986) | Peak position |
|---|---|
| Australian Albums (Kent Music Report) | 2 |
| Austrian Albums (Ö3 Austria) | 4 |
| Canada Top Albums/CDs (RPM) | 2 |
| Dutch Albums (Album Top 100) | 1 |
| Finland (The Official Finnish Charts) | 2 |
| French Albums (SNEP) | 9 |
| German Albums (Offizielle Top 100) | 2 |
| Italian Albums (Musica e Dischi) | 3 |
| Japanese Albums (Oricon) | 6 |
| New Zealand Albums (RMNZ) | 3 |
| Norwegian Albums (VG-lista) | 3 |
| Spanish Albums (PROMUSICAE) | 2 |
| Swedish Albums (Sverigetopplistan) | 4 |
| Swiss Albums (Schweizer Hitparade) | 1 |
| UK Albums (Official Charts) | 4 |
| US Billboard 200 | 4 |

=== Year-end charts ===
1986 year-end chart performance for Dirty Work
| Chart (1986) | Position |
|---|---|
| Australian Albums Chart | 23 |
| Austrian Albums (Ö3 Austria Top 40) | 28 |
| Canada Top Albums/CDs (RPM) | 20 |
| Dutch Albums (Album Top 100) | 28 |
| French Albums (SNEP) | 26 |
| New Zealand Albums (RMNZ) | 23 |
| US Billboard 200 | 79 |

== Certifications ==
Certifications for Dirty Work
| Region | Certification | Certified units/sales |
|---|---|---|
| Australia (ARIA) | Platinum | 70,000^{^} |
| Canada (Music Canada) | Platinum | 100,000^{^} |
| France (SNEP) | Gold | 100,000^{*} |
| Germany (BVMI) | Gold | 250,000^{^} |
| Netherlands (NVPI) | Gold | 50,000^{^} |
| New Zealand (RMNZ) | Platinum | 15,000^{^} |
| United Kingdom (BPI) | Gold | 100,000^{^} |
| United States (RIAA) | Platinum | 1,000,000^{^} |
^{*} Sales figures based on certification alone.^{^} Shipments figures based on certification alone.
