= Send It to Me =

Song by The Rolling Stones

from the album Emotional Rescue
- A-side: "She's So Cold"
- Released: 20 June 1980
- Recorded: 27 June – 8 October 1979; November–December 1979, April 1980
- Studio: Pathé-Marconi (Paris, France); Electric Lady (New York City)
- Genre: Reggae
- Length: 3:43
- Label: Rolling Stones/Virgin
- Songwriter: Jagger/Richards
- Producer: The Glimmer Twins

Emotional Rescue track listing
- 10 tracks Side one: 1. "Dance (Pt. 1)"; 2. "Summer Romance"; 3. "Send It to Me"; 4. "Let Me Go"; 5. "Indian Girl"; Side two: 6. "Where the Boys Go"; 7. "Down in the Hole"; 8. "Emotional Rescue"; 9. "She's So Cold"; 10. "All About You"

"Send It to Me" is a song by English rock and roll band the Rolling Stones featured on the 1980 album Emotional Rescue.

Credited to Mick Jagger and Keith Richards, "Send It to Me" is largely the work of Jagger, with him saying at the time of its release, "I did it with Charlie [Watts] very early on... That was a good example of one, you know, we tried in all kinds of different ways, different times." The song is heavily influenced by reggae music, the Stones being very big fans ever since their introduction to it during the recording sessions for 1973's Goats Head Soup in Jamaica. Its influence is also felt on a number of earlier tracks like "Cherry Oh Baby" off Black and Blue, and later Richards compositions. While the influence is evident, Bill Janovitz notes in his review of the song that it also incorporates "...a great R&B guitar lick from Keith Richards... and then cuts to a disco feel for the chorus." The song's lyrics deal with "...a lonely man looking for a mail-order bride," and a quite tongue-in-cheek in their approach to this subject, with Jagger invoking off-the-cuff rhymes and in an affected, drawn vocal performance:

Oh, I think I had enough of your religion/it's tough, it's a state of mind/I don't need it! Sending a letter, To my mother/I need some loving, Send it to me.

Yeah, and I'm begging you, Begging you, down on my knees/Baby please, please please/You, you, got to send it, send it, send it/Send it to me, Send her to me.

She could be Romanian, Could be Bulgarian, Could be Albanian, Could be Hungarian, Might be Ukrainian, Could be Australian, Could be the Alien, Send her to me.

Associate producer and chief engineer Chris Kimsey remarked on the song after the album's release, "I remember it being very, very long, about twelve minutes long. I had to chop it down to whatever it ended up being. I think, in the twelve-minute version, there were like 19 or 20 verses and we just picked the last verses out and chopped it all together."

Janovitz concludes of the song, "Taken for what it is and not what it is a harbinger of, however, 'Send It to Me' is a fun song — catchy, with numerous hooks, and also fun to sing along to. An oft-repeated criticism of the Stones from this period on notes that their records seem to be written as an excuse to go out and tour, as if they need one. It is a valid point, though; the records seem like afterthoughts, and songs such as "Send It to Me" seem to be written to be performed live". In fact the Rolling Stones have never performed "Send It to Me" live on any of their tours since its introduction, and the Stones didn't even tour in support of Emotional Rescue's release at all.

Recording began on "Send It to Me" in June 1979 at Pathé Marconi Studios in Paris, France and concluded later in the year at New York City's Electric Lady Studios. With Jagger on lead vocals, Ronnie Wood performs electric slide guitar, including the song's solo. Richards provides the song's rhythm guitar hooks. Watts and Bill Wyman perform the song's thumping drums and bass, respectively. Harmonica is performed by Sugar Blue, a contributor to songs from the Stones' previous album, Some Girls, and their next, Tattoo You. Reggae singer Max Romeo also makes a notable contribution by providing the song's driving percussion elements.

== Personnel ==
According to the authors Philippe Margotin and Jean-Michel Guesdon.

The Rolling Stones

- Mick Jagger – lead vocals
- Keith Richards – rhythm and lead guitar
- Ronnie Wood – rhythm and lead guitar, slide guitar
- Bill Wyman – bass guitar
- Charlie Watts – drums

Additional musicians

- Nicky Hopkins – synthesiser
- Sugar Blue – harmonica
- Michael Shrieve – percussion

Technical

- The Glimmer Twins – producers
- Chris Kimsey – associate producer, engineer
- Sean Fullan – assistant engineer
- Brad Samuelsohn – assistant engineer
- Ron "Snake" Reynolds – assistant engineer
- Jon Smith – assistant engineer
