= One Hit (To the Body) =

Single by the Rolling Stones

from the album Dirty Work
- B-side: "Fight"
- Released: 9 May 1986
- Recorded: January – October, 1985
- Genre: Rock, hard rock
- Length: 4:44 (LP); 4:11 (single); 7:00 (12")
- Label: Rolling Stones
- Songwriter: Mick Jagger/Keith Richards/Ronnie Wood
- Producers: Steve Lillywhite and The Glimmer Twins

The Rolling Stones singles chronology
"Harlem Shuffle" (1986)	"One Hit (To the Body)" (1986)	"Mixed Emotions" (1989)

"One Hit (To the Body)" is the opening track to the English rock band the Rolling Stones' 1986 album Dirty Work. The song was released as the album's second single on 9 May in the United States and on 19 May in the United Kingdom, with "Fight" as its B-side. It was the first Rolling Stones single to feature a Ron Wood co-writing credit with Jagger and Richards.

The song charted in the United States, reaching the top 30 there, peaking at number 28. It also charted in the Netherlands (number 50), Belgium (number 29), Australia (number 34), New Zealand (number 30), and the UK, peaking at number 80, making it their poorest charting single at the time.

== Recording ==
Credited to lead singer Mick Jagger, guitarist Keith Richards and guitarist Ron Wood, "One Hit (To the Body)" was largely the work of Richards and Wood. Both guitarists contributed heavily to Dirty Work overall, with Wood receiving credit alongside Jagger and Richards on another three songs. A sign of Wood's heavy contribution is the song's distinctive opening of an acoustic piece. Wood used Richards' own 1967 Martin D-18 to perform the jam in an attempt to come up with a proper electric riff, but the acoustic version remained. The band is known for their use of acoustic guitars to "shadow" their electric guitars; "Brown Sugar" is a prime example. Both Richards and Wood played electric, but the solo was provided by Led Zeppelin guitarist Jimmy Page. Page's contribution was the result of a short studio session between him and Wood after Page's request to hear what the band was working on. Drummer Charlie Watts provides the song's driving beat as well as its notable cymbal opening, while Bill Wyman plays bass.

Backing vocals on the song were provided by Richards, Wood, Bobby Womack, Patti Scialfa, Don Covay, and producer Steve Lillywhite's wife Kirsty MacColl. Recording and re-recording lasted throughout much of 1985. Jimmy Page's contributions were recorded at RPM Studios on 16 and 17 July 1985. Two locations used were the Pathé Marconi Studios in Paris and New York City's RPM Studios.

== Music video ==
One of the song's most memorable features was the music video produced in support, directed by Russell Mulcahy. Featuring the Stones in a large warehouse set, the song's title is taken literally and both Jagger and Richards are seen trading mock blows while archive footage of actual boxing matches is cut in.

== Remix ==
A remix of the song, called the "London Mix" (clocking at 7:00), was done by Steve Lillywhite and then released on the 12" single.

== Personnel ==
According to the authors Philippe Margotin and Jean-Michel Guesdon.

The Rolling Stones

- Mick Jagger – lead vocals
- Keith Richards – backing vocals, rhythm guitars, acoustic guitar
- Ronnie Wood – backing vocals, acoustic guitars
- Bill Wyman – bass guitar
- Charlie Watts – drums

Additional personnel

- Jimmy Page – lead guitar
- Chuck Leavell – keyboards
- Bobby Womack – backing vocals
- Don Covay – backing vocals
- Kirsty MacColl – backing vocals
- Patti Scialfa – backing vocals
- Beverly D'Angelo – backing vocals

Technical

- Steve Lilywhite – producer
- The Glimmer Twins – producers
- Dave Jerden – engineer
- Steve Parker – engineer
- Tim Crich – assistant engineer
- Mike Krowiak – assistant engineer

== Charts ==
Chart performance for "One Hit (To the Body)"
Chart (1986)	Peak position
Australia (Kent Music Report)	34
Belgium (Ultratop 50 Flanders)	29
Netherlands (Single Top 100)	50
New Zealand (Recorded Music NZ)	30
UK Singles (Official Charts)	80
US Billboard Hot 100	28
