= Dance (Pt. 1) =

Song by the Rolling Stones

from the album Emotional Rescue
- Released: 20 June 1980
- Recorded: 27 June – 8 October 1979; November–December 1979, April 1980
- Studio: Pathé-Marconi (Paris, France); Electric Lady (New York City)
- Genre: Funk rock; disco
- Length: 4:23
- Label: Rolling Stones
- Songwriters: Mick Jagger, Keith Richards, Ronnie Wood
- Producer: The Glimmer Twins

Emotional Rescue track listing
- 10 tracks Side one: 1. "Dance (Pt. 1)"; 2. "Summer Romance"; 3. "Send It to Me"; 4. "Let Me Go"; 5. "Indian Girl"; Side two: 6. "Where the Boys Go"; 7. "Down in the Hole"; 8. "Emotional Rescue"; 9. "She's So Cold"; 10. "All About You"

"Dance (Pt. 1)" is a song by the British rock band the Rolling Stones. Written by Mick Jagger, Keith Richards, and Ronnie Wood, the song evolved out of a single riff. The song appeared as the opening track on the band's 1980 album Emotional Rescue.

== Release and reception ==
"Dance (Pt. 1)" was released as the first track on Emotional Rescue in June 1980. Although not released as a single, the song reached No. 9 on Billboard's Dance chart. Ultimate Classic Rock ranked the song as the 81st best Rolling Stones song, saying "If you think there was something wrong — as some fans contend — with the Rolling Stones dabbling in dance and disco rhythms as powerfully and capably as they do on 'Dance (Pt. 1)', the opening track to their 1980 album Emotional Rescue, we'd like to invite you to explain it to us."

== Personnel ==
According to the authors Philippe Margotin and Jean-Michel Guesdon.

The Rolling Stones

- Mick Jagger – lead vocals
- Keith Richards – rhythm and lead guitar, backing vocals
- Ronnie Wood – rhythm and lead guitar, bass guitar (?), backing vocals
- Bill Wyman – bass guitar (?)
- Charlie Watts – drums

Additional musicians

- Bobby Keys – saxophone
- Michael Shrieve – percussion
- Max Romeo – backing vocals

Technical

- The Glimmer Twins – producers
- Chris Kimsey – associate producer, engineer
- Sean Fullan – assistant engineer
- Brad Samuelsohn – assistant engineer
- Ron "Snake" Reynolds – assistant engineer
- Jon Smith – assistant engineer

Note: Margotin and Guesdon are unsure if Jagger played percussion and if it was Wood or Wyman who played bass.
