= Half Pint =

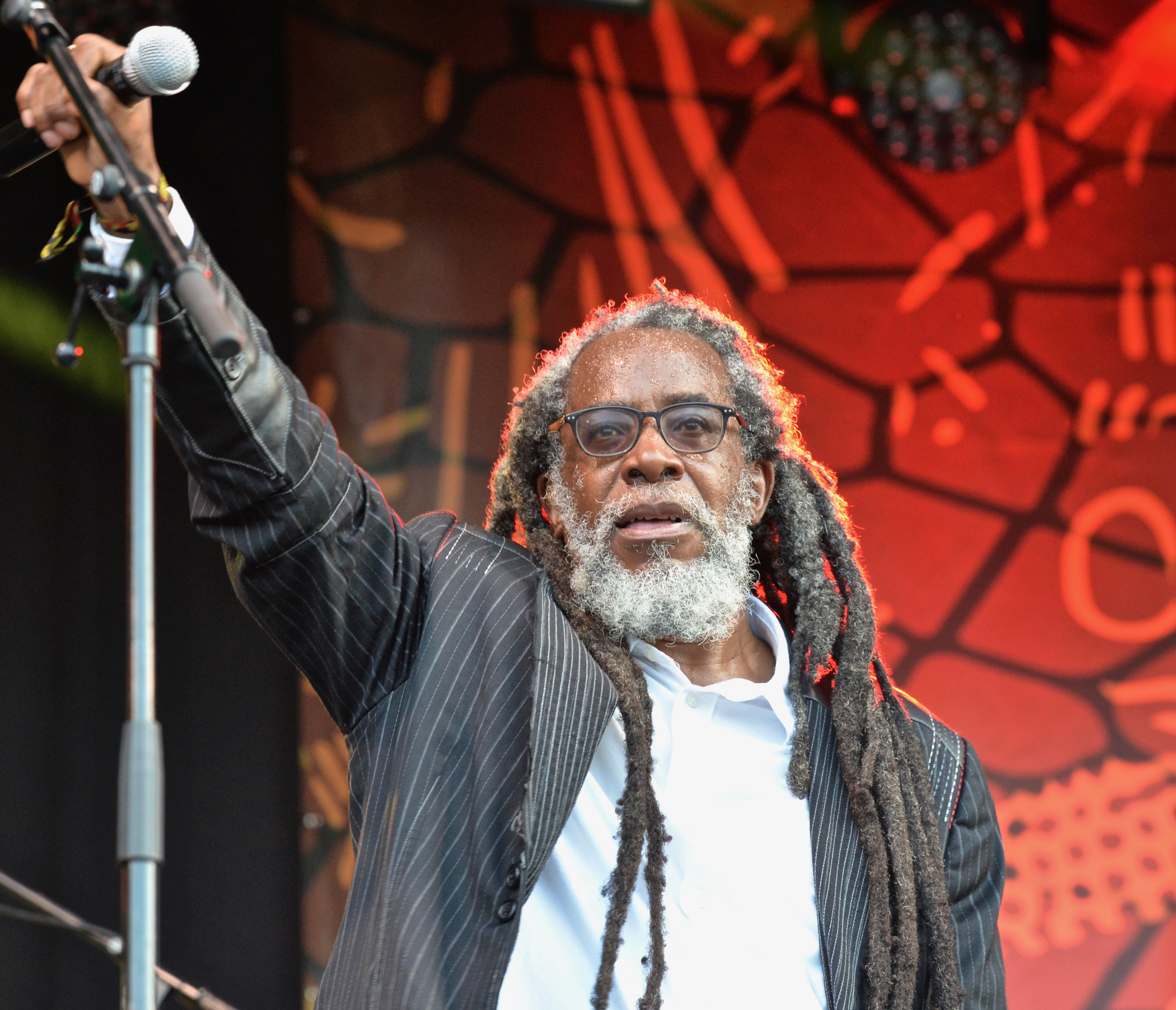
- Half Pint, Reggae Geel, 3 August 2019, Belgium

Background information
- Born: Lindon Andrew Roberts; 11 November 1961 (age 65)
- Origin: Kingston, Jamaica
- Genres: Reggae, dancehall, ragga
- Instrument: Vocals
- Website: halfpintmusic.com

Lindon Andrew Roberts (born 11 November 1961), professionally known as Half Pint, is a Jamaican dancehall, ragga, and reggae singer.

== Biography ==
He originates from the West Kingston enclave of Rose Lane; a community which has produced reggae acts such as Bob Marley, Dennis Brown, Peter Tosh, Lee "Scratch" Perry, and Toots Hibbert.

Half Pint began singing in the school choir at All Saints' Primary School. After the completion of his secondary education in 1976, he sought work as a vocalist within the Jamaican music industry. Half Pint toured the island with various sound systems including Black Scorpio, Jammys, Gemini, Lee's Unlimited and Killimanjaro. He subsequently worked with record producers such as Errol (John) Marshall; Errol (Myrie) Lewis; King Jammy; Sly and Robbie; George Phang; Jack Scorpio, Bobby "Digital" Dixon and Mass Hugh. He also collaborated with Garnett Silk, Tony Rebel and The Tamlins.

His first single, "Sally", was released in 1983 and was a hit in Jamaica, followed later that year with "Winsome".

He released Money Man Skank, recorded in the early 1980s by King Jammy, which possessed energy, ebullience and style that epitomised the dancehall feel.

In 1983, Pint's first single, "Sally", was released followed by the song "Winsome", and both tracks became reggae hits. He continued to release songs that became hits in the local and international reggae scenes, including "Mr. Landlord", "Level the Vibes", "Substitute Lover" and the chart-topper, Half Pint's all-time greatest hit "Greetings" was released on Powerhouse in 1986 and was recorded in a single take. Besides these singles, Roberts has also released a number of albums. His largest fanbases are in Europe, Japan, Brazil, and the West Coast of the United States.

Half Pint's 1983 Jamaican number-one song "Winsome" was covered by The Rolling Stones in 1986, although it was renamed "Too Rude" for their Dirty Work album. The dub-punk group Sublime released a cover of Half Pint's "Loving" in 1996, which they also interpolated for the chorus of their song "What I Got". Half Pint maintained his public profile by frequent touring and guest appearances. He has performed at music festivals and rock concerts. Half Pint's track "Giving/Sharing" was featured on the soundtrack album for the film, The Mighty Quinn (1989). His music has also been used on the films Substitute 2 (1998), and the French comedy Mookie (1998). In 1998, Half Pint was signed with the BMG Music Publishing Company.

Despite being noticeably absent from the recording studios for most of this decade, Half Pint enjoyed relative success with Legal We Legal (his first studio album within a ten-year period). This was followed by a fifteen city US tour with Anthony B. Half Pint was presented with "The Key to The City of Lauderdale Lakes" by the Mayor of the Florida suburb in 2000. Half Pint was featured on Sly & Robbie's 25th Anniversary US Tour along with Tony Rebel and Heineken Startime appearances in December 2004 in Jamaica. Half Pint has worked with the California-based band, DubCat. The New York-based Sotti Records label released a Half Pint single in 2005, "Wha Ya Wan", an updated remake of his "Winsome", with R&B singer DIA.

Half Pint was nominated and awarded the "Producer's Respect Award" at the 26th International Reggae and World Music Awards held in New York City at the Apollo Theater on 5 May 2007. Half Pint headlined at the Jamaica 360 festival in Ocho Rios, Jamaica in May, and a return performance at the 15th Annual Reggae Sumfest in Montego Bay, Jamaica in July. He also released No Stress Express that year.

In 2012, Half Pint toured the United States with Slightly Stoopid on their 'Unity' tour.

== Work with other musicians ==
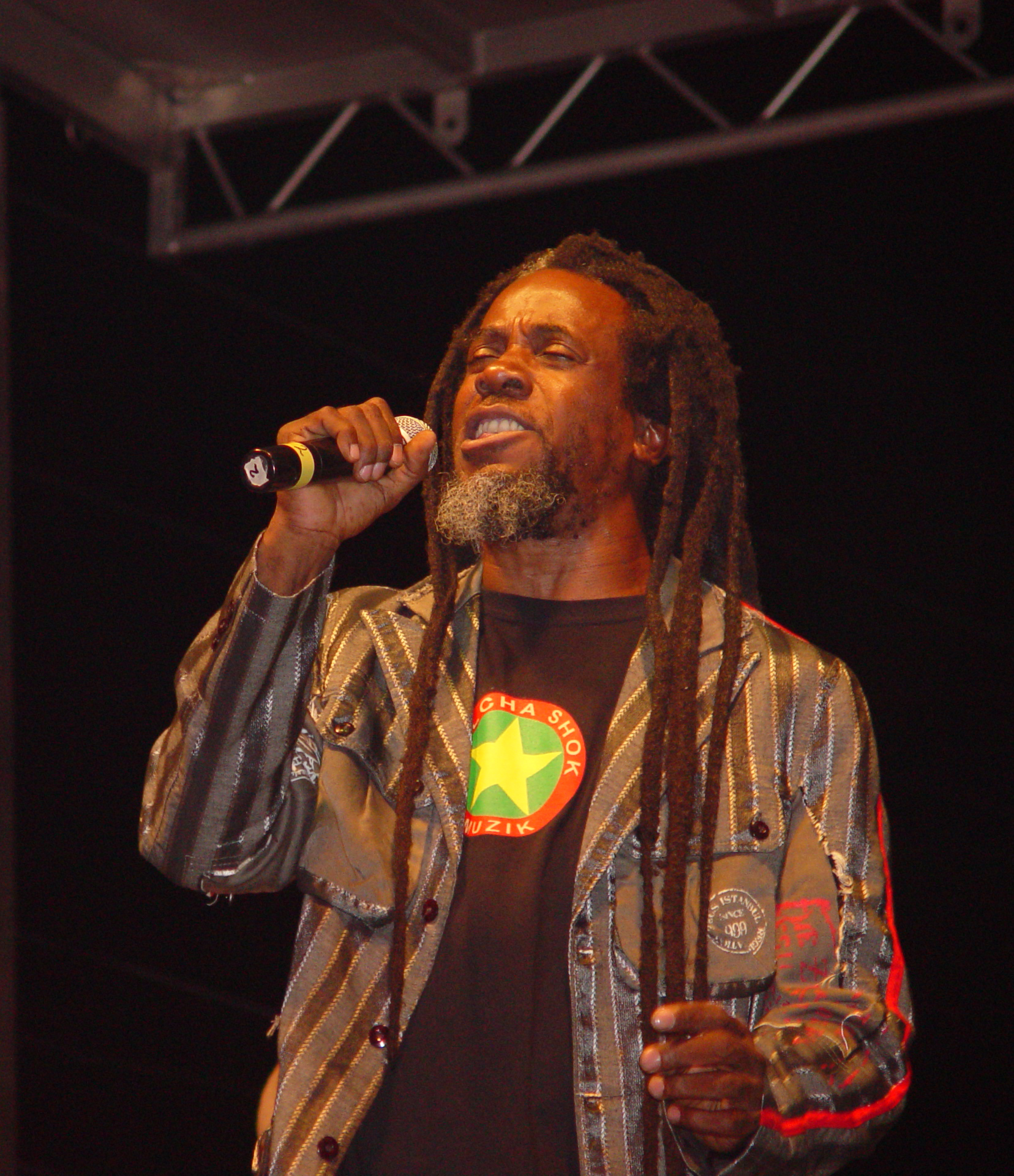
Half Pint at Dennis Brown Tribute Show 22 May 2012

Half Pint has been featured as a guest on a number of songs by other artists including:

- "Pass It On" by Long Beach Dub Allstars, from the album Right Back
- "Life Goes On" by Long Beach Dub Allstars, from the album Wonders of the World
- "Sunday Afternoon" by Lucky Boys Confusion, from the album Commitment
- On 2006's "Bongidae! Silverback Music Festival" version, Dubcat featured on tracks "Level the Vibes", "Cost of Living" and "Winsome". Also, Half Pint collaborated with Slightly Stoopid.
- "Women of the Night" by Stick Figure, from the album Burial Ground released 12 June 2012
- "Come Away" by Vana Liya, from the album Little Kahuna released 3 September 2021

== Discography ==
=== Albums ===
- In Fine Style (1984) Sunset Records
- Money Man Skank (1984) Jammys
- One in a Million (1984) Greensleeves
- Great Hits of All Times (1985) Feel the Beat
- Greetings (1986) Power House
- Joint Favourites (1986) Greensleeves
- Level the Vibes (1987) Taxi Records
- Victory (1988) RAS
- 20 Super Hits (1990) Sonic Sounds
- One Big Family (1990) Power House
- Pick Your Choice (1993) VP Records
- Classics (1994) Outa!/Hightone
- Classics In Dub (1995) Outa!/Hightone
- Collection (1997) Tachyon (Japan)
- Half Pint (1997) VP Records
- Legal We Legal (1998) Artists Only!
- Closer to You (1999) Half Pint Music
- Recollection (2000) Cornerstone R.A.S./Skunk
- Past to Present (2006) Ryff Music
- No Stress Express' (2008) Half Pint Music/Essential/Universal Music Group
- Essential Roots Anthology (2008) Essential Media Group

=== Singles ===
- "Winsome" (1984)
