= Wanna Hold You =

Song by the Rolling Stones

from the album Undercover
- Released: 7 November 1983
- Recorded: November–December 1982
- Genre: Pop rock
- Length: 3:52
- Label: Rolling Stones/Virgin
- Songwriter: Jagger/Richards
- Producers: The Glimmer Twins and Chris Kimsey

Undercover track listing
- 10 tracks Side one: 1. "Undercover of the Night"; 2. "She Was Hot"; 3. "Tie You Up (The Pain of Love)"; 4. "Wanna Hold You"; 5. "Feel On Baby"; Side two: 6. "Too Much Blood"; 7. "Pretty Beat Up"; 8. "Too Tough"; 9. "All the Way Down"; 10. "It Must Be Hell"

"Wanna Hold You" is a song by the English rock band the Rolling Stones on their 1983 album Undercover.

Although credited to Mick Jagger and Keith Richards, "Wanna Hold You" is largely a Richards composition. The song was written in a recording studio in Paris in the basement of a house of one of Richards' acquaintances. Richards describes the song's structure as being "very early sort of Lennon & McCartney, let alone the title, which suggest "I Want to Hold Your Hand". The first recording of the song, of which Richards claims to have the original tape, had only Richards on guitar and vocals and Jagger on drums.

The lyrics deal with the often-used topic of a poor man having nothing but love to give to a woman, as the following line illustrates:

I hope you find it funny that I've got no money - but if you stick with me you're going to get some love for free

During the Rolling Stones' Bridges To Babylon Tour, "Wanna Hold You" was a regular part of the mini-set sung by Richards and was performed 99 times (of 107 concerts in total).

== Personnel ==
According to the authors Philippe Margotin and Jean-Michel Guesdon.

The Rolling Stones

- Keith Richards – lead vocals, rhythm guitar
- Ronnie Wood – lead and rhythm guitar, bass guitar, backing vocals
- Charlie Watts – drums

Technical

- The Glimmer Twins – producers
- Chris Kimsey – producer, engineer
- Brian McGee – engineer
- Rod Thear – assistant engineer
- Steve Lipson – assistant engineer
- John Davenport – assistant engineer
- Bobby Cohen – assistant engineer
- Benji Armbrister – assistant engineer
