= All About You (Rolling Stones song) =

Song by the Rolling Stones

from the album Emotional Rescue
- Released: 20 June 1980
- Recorded: 23 January – 12 February 1979; November–December 1979, April 1980
- Studio: Compass Point (Nassau, Bahamas); Electric Lady (New York City)
- Genre: Rock; blues rock; soft rock
- Length: 4:18
- Label: Rolling Stones/Virgin
- Songwriter: Jagger–Richards
- Producer: The Glimmer Twins

Emotional Rescue track listing
- 10 tracks Side one: 1. "Dance (Pt. 1)"; 2. "Summer Romance"; 3. "Send It to Me"; 4. "Let Me Go"; 5. "Indian Girl"; Side two: 6. "Where the Boys Go"; 7. "Down in the Hole"; 8. "Emotional Rescue"; 9. "She's So Cold"; 10. "All About You"

"All About You" is a song by the Rolling Stones featured as the closing track to their 1980 album Emotional Rescue. It is sung by guitarist Keith Richards.

Credited to the writing team of Mick Jagger and Richards, "All About You" is solely the work of Richards. The song is a slow bittersweet ballad that has been interpreted as a final comment on the Anita Pallenberg romance that began in 1967 and ended in 1979 when Richards met his future wife model Patti Hansen. Richards' lyrics and singing express mixed feelings of attachment and revulsion; however, the song may also be interpreted as an early sign of the fracturing relationship between Richards and Jagger, the longtime leaders of the band. Richards had "cleaned up" after his 1977 Toronto heroin bust and wanted to take more responsibility back from Jagger. The lead singer and businessman had kept the band rolling through the worst period of Richards' excesses in the 70s, and in several interviews, Richards stated he immediately encountered resistance from Jagger regarding his new interest in taking some of the front man's burden.

Richards said in 2002, "I went through a very tough thing in the early '80s with Mick. So you get some songs like 'All About You,' to name just one. There's more on some of the Expensive Winos records." Saxophonist Bobby Keys said of the song, "It had a little bit of sentimental input there about his feelings for Mick at the time. Just listen to the lyrics". Richards later clarified in his 2010 autobiography: "there's never one thing a song's about but, in this case, if it was about anything, it was probably more about Mick." In the song, Richards bemoans a relationship he's in with harsh lyrics:

Well if you call this a life, Why must I spend mine with you? If the show must go on, Let it go on without you.

Though the laughs may be cheap, That's just 'cause the joke's about you/I'm so sick and tired, Of hanging around with dogs like you.

On the writing, Richards said, "That song was hanging around for three years. After researching to make sure it wasn't somebody else who wrote it, I finally decided that it must have been me". Recording took place between January and February 1979 during the earliest recordings made for Emotional Rescue. A sign of his closeness to the song, Richards performs lead vocals, bass, piano, electric guitar, and backing vocals. Ronnie Wood plays guitar on the track and performs some backing vocals, while Charlie Watts plays drums and Bobby Keys plays sax. Neither Mick Jagger nor Bill Wyman appear on the completed track.

An early take with an unfinished vocal track has recently surfaced on bootleg, and an embryonic instrumental from the Some Girls sessions, called "Train Song" is reported to exist.

"All About You" was performed by Richards during the 1997-1998 Bridges to Babylon Tour and the 1999 No Security Tour.

== Personnel ==
According to the authors Philippe Margotin and Jean-Michel Guesdon.

The Rolling Stones

- Keith Richards – lead vocals, rhythm guitar, piano, bass guitar
- Ronnie Wood – rhythm guitar, backing vocals
- Charlie Watts – drums

Additional musician

- Bobby Keys – saxophone

Technical

- The Glimmer Twins – producers
- Chris Kimsey – associate producer, engineer
- Sean Fullan – assistant engineer
- Brad Samuelsohn – assistant engineer
- Ron "Snake" Reynolds – assistant engineer
- Jon Smith – assistant engineer

Note: Margotin and Guesdon are unsure if Richards played acoustic guitar.
