= Undercover of the Night =

Single by the Rolling Stones

from the album Undercover
- B-side: "All the Way Down"
- Released: 31 October 1983
- Recorded: January, May–August 1983
- Genre: New wave; dance-rock; funk
- Length: 4:32
- Label: Rolling Stones
- Songwriter: Mick Jagger, Keith Richards
- Producer: The Glimmer Twins/Chris Kimsey

The Rolling Stones singles chronology
"Time Is on My Side" (1982)	"Undercover of the Night" (1983)	"She Was Hot" (1984)

Undercover track listing
- 10 tracks Side one: 1. "Undercover of the Night"; 2. "She Was Hot"; 3. "Tie You Up (The Pain of Love)"; 4. "Wanna Hold You"; 5. "Feel On Baby"; Side two: 6. "Too Much Blood"; 7. "Pretty Beat Up"; 8. "Too Tough"; 9. "All the Way Down"; 10. "It Must Be Hell"

"Undercover of the Night" is the lead track and first single from the English band the Rolling Stones' 1983 album Undercover.

== Inspiration and recording ==
The song was largely a Mick Jagger composition, with guitarist Keith Richards going as far as saying, "Mick had this one all mapped out, I just played on it". Jagger later said that the song "was heavily influenced by William Burroughs’ Cities of the Red Night, a free-wheeling novel about political and sexual repression. It combines a number of different references to what was going down in Argentina and Chile." The song was likely written in Paris in late 1982, where recording began on the album.

In 2003, guitarist Ronnie Wood described the fractious writing as "just me, Mick and Charlie [Watts]... [We] took it up into some wonderful adventures with all these different changes... There was a great percussive and acoustic version, which is the kind of song it should be. The final polished, glossed-up version may have been Mick's vision of the song..."

The lyrics see Jagger explore the then-ongoing political corruption in Central and South America:

All the young men, they've been rounded up;
And sent to camps back in the jungle;
And people whisper, people double-talk;
Once proud fathers act so humble.

"Undercover of the Night" is one of the few songs by the Rolling Stones which overtly explore political ideas.

Hubert Kretzschmar, photographer and illustrator, said, "As far as I remember Jagger came to the meeting with the title, I knew that there was political unrest in South America around that time, El Salvador, Argentina and Chile. There was no visual concept when I first met with Jagger and he talked about the song Undercover. At that time in 1983 there was a feud between Jagger and Richards, of which I only very much later became aware. They never were in the studio at the same time."

Keith Richards said of the release, "It must have been pretty bad for anyone around us who worked in Undercover. A hostile, discordant atmosphere. We were barely talking or communicating and if we were, we were bickering and sniping."

Recording began in early 1983 and was resumed later that summer at New York City's famed Hit Factory. There are two versions of this song, one unreleased version featuring Rolling Stones bassist Bill Wyman and the released version featuring both Bill Wyman and guest bassist Robbie Shakespeare. The song features Sly Dunbar, Martin Ditcham, Moustapha Cisse and Brahms Coundoul, on various instruments ranging from bongos to timpani. Organ on the piece is performed by Chuck Leavell, who later became the Rolling Stones' regular pianist.

== Release ==
"Undercover of the Night" was released as the first single taken from the album on 31 October 1983. Initial reception was warm with the song reaching number 9 on the US Billboard Hot 100, number 2 on the US Billboard Mainstream Rock and number 11 on the UK Singles Chart, though the violent depictions spelled out by Jagger were believed to be why its popularity quickly waned. Jagger in Jump Back's liner notes: "I think it's really good but it wasn't particularly successful at the time because songs that deal overtly with politics never are that successful, for some reason." Richards countered: "There were a lot more overlays on this track, because there was a lot more separation in the way we were recording at that time. Mick and I were starting to come to loggerheads."

The song has been performed sporadically since its release, most recently on the A Bigger Bang Tour in 2006, and appeared on compilation albums including 2002's Forty Licks and 2012's GRRR!.

The twelve-inch remix of this track is used in episode 6 of the 2022 Netflix series Pieces of Her.

== Music video ==
The music video was filmed in Mexico City, featuring Jagger as a detective helping a woman (played by Elpidia Carrillo) follow her boyfriend's (also played by Jagger) kidnappers and Richards as the leader of the kidnappers, who eventually shoots Jagger. The music video, directed by Julien Temple, was considered to be too violent for MTV (they did eventually air an edited version, but not before 9 PM due to the violent imagery). An uncensored version of the video was included on the band's Video Rewind compilation.

== Personnel ==
According to the authors Philippe Margotin and Jean-Michel Guesdon.

The Rolling Stones

- Mick Jagger – vocals
- Ronnie Wood – rhythm and lead guitar
- Bill Wyman – bass guitar
- Charlie Watts – drums

Additional musicians

- Chuck Leavell – keyboards
- Sly Dunbar – Simmons drums

Technical

- The Glimmer Twins – producers
- Chris Kimsey – producer, engineer
- Brian McGee – engineer
- Rod Thear – assistant engineer
- Steve Lipson – assistant engineer
- John Davenport – assistant engineer
- Bobby Cohen – assistant engineer
- Benji Armbrister – assistant engineer

Note: Margotin and Guesdon are unsure if Jagger or Keith Richards played rhythm guitar.

== Charts ==
=== Weekly charts ===
Chart (1983–1984)	Peak position
Australia (Kent Music Report)	27
Austria (Ö3 Austria Top 40)	19
Belgium (Ultratop 50 Flanders)	5
Canada Hit Parade (CHUM Chart)	1
Canada Top Singles (RPM)	11
Spain (Los 40)	1
Finland (Soumen Virallinen)	19
Ireland (IRMA)	10
Netherlands (Dutch Top 40)	5
Netherlands (Single Top 100)	4
New Zealand (Recorded Music NZ)	10
Norway (VG-lista)	8
Sweden (Sverigetopplistan)	15
Switzerland (Schweizer Hitparade)	18
UK Singles (Official Charts)	11
Uruguay (UPI)	2
US Billboard Hot 100	9
US Cash Box Top 100	12
West Germany (GfK)	20

=== Year-end charts ===
Chart (1983)	Position
Belgium (Ultratop Flanders)	85
Netherlands (Dutch Top 40)	57
Netherlands (Single Top 100)	55

Chart (1984)	Position
US Billboard Hot 100	93
