= Winsome (song) =

1984 song by Half Pint

Single by Half Pint

from the album In Fine Style
- Released: 1984
- Genre: Reggae
- Label: Sunset
- Songwriter: Lindon Roberts
- Producers: Errol Marshall; Errol Lewis

"Winsome" is a song by the Jamaican artist Half Pint. It appears on his debut album from 1984, In Fine Style. The song became a number-one hit.

== The Rolling Stones version ==
"Too Rude"

Song by the Rolling Stones

from the album Dirty Work
- Released: 24 March 1986
- Genre: Reggae
- Length: 3:11
- Label: Rolling Stones; Columbia
- Songwriter: Lindon Roberts
- Producers: Steve Lillywhite; The Glimmer Twins

The British rock band the Rolling Stones covered the song on their album Dirty Work. The song was renamed "Too Rude" and was sung by guitarist Keith Richards instead of the usual lead singer, Mick Jagger. The co-producer, Steve Lillywhite, used lots of echo tracks, particularly on bass and drums. Jimmy Cliff assists on vocals. "Too Rude" was provisionally a title of the album until Dirty Work was selected. "Too Rude" was covered by Keith Richards' X-pensive Winos when they performed it live in 1988.

=== Personnel ===
According to the authors Philippe Margotin and Jean-Michel Guesdon.

The Rolling Stones

- Keith Richards – lead vocals, rhythm guitar, various guitars
- Ronnie Wood – bass guitar, drums, various guitars

Additional personnel

- Jimmy Cliff – vocal harmonies

Technical

- Steve Lilywhite – producer
- The Glimmer Twins – producers
- Dave Jerden – engineer
- Steve Parker – engineer
- Tim Crich – assistant engineer
- Mike Krowiak – assistant engineer

Note: Margotin and Guesdon are unsure if Chuck Leavell played keyboards.
