= Too Much Blood =

- 12" single cover

Single by the Rolling Stones

from the album Undercover
- Released: December 1984
- Recorded: October–November 1982
- Studio: Pathé Marconi Studios (Paris), Hit Factory (New York)
- Genre: Post-disco; funk rock
- Length: 6:14 (Album version); 12:33 (Dance version); 8:49 (12" Mix - Main Vocal)
- Label: Rolling Stones/Virgin
- Songwriter: Jagger/Richards
- Producers: The Glimmer Twins and Chris Kimsey

Undercover track listing
- 10 tracks Side one: 1. "Undercover of the Night"; 2. "She Was Hot"; 3. "Tie You Up (The Pain of Love)"; 4. "Wanna Hold You"; 5. "Feel On Baby"; Side two: 6. "Too Much Blood"; 7. "Pretty Beat Up"; 8. "Too Tough"; 9. "All the Way Down"; 10. "It Must Be Hell"

"Too Much Blood" is a song by the Rolling Stones featured on their seventeenth studio album Undercover (1983), released as the album's third single in December 1984. The song was released only in the US and charted on the US Mainstream Rock and reached #38.

== Background and composition ==
Credited to Mick Jagger and Keith Richards, "Too Much Blood" is largely a Jagger composition. The song is a reflection of the many influences the Stones had during their career in the mid-1980s. Jagger said at the time of its release, "I had made out a very honest burden of mind before everyone had arrived one night. It was just Charlie [Watts] and Bill [Wyman]. And one of our roadies called Jim Barber, he was playing guitar on it too. And I just started playing this riff I had, with this middle part, I didn't have any words to it and then I just suddenly started rapping out these words which are the ones you hear." Barber remarked that "Mick asked me if I could do an 'Andy Summers' on the track."

The song itself deals with the growing depictions of violence in the media at the time and the case of Issei Sagawa, with Jagger saying, "Well there was this scandalous, murderous story in France - it was a true story - about this Japanese guy who murdered this girl and it sort of captured the imagination of the French public, and the Japanese. The Russians wanted to make a movie out of it. So that was the first bit and then I started becoming more light-hearted about it, movies and all. ...it came out as a sort of anti-gratuitous cinema of violence. And it's a kind of anti-violent thing."

Did you ever see The Texas Chain Saw Massacre? Horrible, wasn't it. You know, people ask me "is it really true where you live in Texas, is that really true what they do around there, people?" I say, "yea, every time I drive through the crossroads, I get scared there's a bloke running round with a fucking chain saw. Oh! Oh! oh No, he's gonna cut off, Oh no. Don't saw off me leg, don't saw off me arm."

Jagger uses a half-hearted rap delivery for some lines, saying at the time, "I'm not a great rapper... It's just made up on the spot as well. It's completely extemporized, as well, most of it. A couple words I cleaned up. I don't mean clean up, just made better sounds. That was just rap off the top of my head. I didn't write it down, even."

Recording took place at Paris' Pathé Marconi Studios and New York City's Hit Factory between October and November 1982. With Jagger on lead vocals, he also performs electric guitars with Barber and Wood. Horns are provided by Chops and percussion by Sly Dunbar.

== Release and critical reception ==
A dance version of "Too Much Blood", remixed by Arthur Baker, was released as a 12-inch single in December 1984. Cash Box said that "heavy percussion fills and an almost tribal groove marks this Arthur Baker mix, yet even his bag full of tricks can not turn this fundamentally soulless tune into a party stopper." A music video, directed by Julien Temple, was produced in support showing the band performing the song as well as Richards and guitarist Ron Wood chasing Jagger with chainsaws. The trio also appear, without chainsaws but still in character, on the record sleeve for the single. The video opens with an excerpt from the first movement of the String Quartet Number 3 by Béla Bartók. "Too Much Blood" has never been performed live by the Stones and appears on no compilation albums.

== Personnel ==
According to the authors Philippe Margotin and Jean-Michel Guesdon.

The Rolling Stones

- Mick Jagger – vocals
- Ronnie Wood – rhythm guitar
- Bill Wyman – bass guitar
- Charlie Watts – drums

Additional musicians

- Jim Barber – lead and rhythm guitar
- Chuck Leavell – keyboards
- The Sugarhill Horn Section CHOPS – horns
- Sly Dunbar – Simmons drums

Technical

- The Glimmer Twins – producers
- Chris Kimsey – producer, engineer
- Brian McGee – engineer
- Rod Thear – assistant engineer
- Steve Lipson – assistant engineer
- John Davenport – assistant engineer
- Bobby Cohen – assistant engineer
- Benji Armbrister – assistant engineer

Note: Margotin and Guesdon are unsure if Jagger or Keith Richards played guitar. They also list Moustapha Cissé, Brahms Coundoul, and Martin Ditcham as possible percussionists.
