= She Was Hot =

Single by the Rolling Stones

from the album Undercover
- B-side: "I Think I'm Going Mad" (non-album track)
- Released: 23 January 1984
- Recorded: November – December 1982, May 1983
- Genre: Hard rock, rock and roll
- Length: 4:40
- Label: Rolling Stones
- Songwriter: Mick Jagger, Keith Richards
- Producer: The Glimmer Twins

The Rolling Stones singles chronology
| "Undercover of the Night" (1983) | "She Was Hot" (1984) | "Harlem Shuffle" (1986) |

Undercover track listing
- 10 tracks Side one: 1. "Undercover of the Night"; 2. "She Was Hot"; 3. "Tie You Up (The Pain of Love)"; 4. "Wanna Hold You"; 5. "Feel On Baby"; Side two: 6. "Too Much Blood"; 7. "Pretty Beat Up"; 8. "Too Tough"; 9. "All the Way Down"; 10. "It Must Be Hell"

"She Was Hot" is a song by the English rock band the Rolling Stones from their 1983 album Undercover.

Recording on "She Was Hot" first began in late 1982. Written by Mick Jagger and Keith Richards, the song is a traditional rock 'n' roll number from the band. The song is notable as both original Rolling Stones pianist Ian Stewart and pianist Chuck Leavell perform on the recording.

"She Was Hot" was released as the second single from the album in late January 1984. The B-side to the single was an Emotional Rescue outtake, "I Think I'm Going Mad" which reached #50 on the US Mainstream Rock chart. The single reached number 44 on the US Charts, number 52 on the US Cash Box charts, and number 42 on the UK Charts.

Cash Box said that "with the band at its raunchy best, Jagger serves up a string of brief vignettes, all with pretty much the same story line. Hot on the 'pleasure trail,' he's 'taking passion where you find it' and providing colorful detail in the play-by-play action reports which comprise the choruses."

A memorable music video was produced for the song, featuring actress Anita Morris who semi-comically tempts each member of the band. The version of the song used in the video includes an extra three-line verse at the 32-second mark which has never been included in any commercial release of the song. The audio is also noticeably sped up in the video by approximately eight percent or a 1.3 semitone increase in pitch. As with its predecessor, "Undercover of the Night", the music video for "She Was Hot" was directed by Julien Temple, and was also edited for broadcast on MTV.

The Rolling Stones resurrected "She Was Hot" for the 2006 United States leg of their A Bigger Bang Tour. The song made its live debut on 11 October 2006 in Chicago, and was a regular part of the band's set list during the tour. The 1 November 2006 performance of "She Was Hot" was captured for the 2008 concert film and live album Shine a Light.

== Personnel ==
According to the authors Philippe Margotin and Jean-Michel Guesdon.

The Rolling Stones

- Mick Jagger – vocals
- Keith Richards – lead and rhythm guitar
- Ronnie Wood – rhythm guitar
- Bill Wyman – bass guitar
- Charlie Watts – drums

Additional musicians

- Ian Stewart – piano
- Chuck Leavell – keyboards

Technical

- The Glimmer Twins – producers
- Chris Kimsey – producer, engineer
- Brian McGee – engineer
- Rod Thear – assistant engineer
- Steve Lipson – assistant engineer
- John Davenport – assistant engineer
- Bobby Cohen – assistant engineer
- Benji Armbrister – assistant engineer

== Charts ==
| Chart (1984) | Peak position |
|---|---|
| Australia (Kent Music Report) | 60 |
| Belgium (Ultratop 50 Flanders) | 20 |
| Germany (GfK) | 54 |
| Netherlands (Single Top 100) | 18 |
| New Zealand (Recorded Music NZ) | 46 |
| UK Singles (Official Charts) | 42 |
| US Billboard Mainstream Rock | 4 |
| US Billboard Hot 100 | 44 |
| US Cash Box Top 100 | 52 |
