= Emotional Rescue =

Studio album by the Rolling Stones
- Released: 23 June 1980
- Recorded: 22 January – 19 October 1979
- Studios: Compass Point (Nassau, Bahamas); Pathé-Marconi (Paris, France); Electric Lady (New York City); The Hit Factory (New York City)
- Genres: Rock; dance-rock; new wave
- Length: 40:58
- Label: Rolling Stones
- Producer: The Glimmer Twins

The Rolling Stones chronology
Time Waits for No One: Anthology 1971–1977 (1979)	Emotional Rescue (1980)	Sucking in the Seventies (1981)

The Rolling Stones studio album chronology
Some Girls (1978)	Emotional Rescue (1980)	Tattoo You (1981)

Singles from Emotional Rescue
- 1. "Emotional Rescue" Released: June 1980; 2. "She's So Cold" Released: September 1980

Emotional Rescue is the fifteenth studio album by the English rock band the Rolling Stones. It was released on 23 June 1980 through Rolling Stones Records. The album followed the successful Some Girls (1978) and continues that record's mix of rock, blues, punk, and disco influences.

Upon release, the album topped the charts in at least six countries, including the United States, UK, and Canada. Hit singles from it include the title track, which reached No. 1 in Canada, No. 3 in the United States, and No. 9 in the UK and "She's So Cold", a top-40 single in several countries. The recording sessions for Emotional Rescue were so productive that several tracks left off the album would form the core of the follow-up, 1981's Tattoo You.

== History ==
Recorded throughout 1979, first in Compass Point Studios, Nassau, Bahamas, then Pathé Marconi, Paris, with some end-of-year overdubbing in New York City at The Hit Factory, Emotional Rescue was the first Rolling Stones album recorded following Keith Richards' exoneration from a Toronto drugs charge that could have landed him in jail for years. Fresh from the revitalization of Some Girls (1978), Richards and Mick Jagger led the Stones through dozens of new songs, some of which were held over for Tattoo You (1981), and picked ten of them for Emotional Rescue.

Several of the tracks on the album featured just the core Rolling Stones band members: Jagger, Richards, Ronnie Wood, Charlie Watts, and Bill Wyman. On others, they were joined by keyboardists Nicky Hopkins and co-founder Ian Stewart, sax player Bobby Keys and harmonica player Sugar Blue.

Songs left off the album appeared on Tattoo You ("Hang Fire", "Little T&A" and "No Use in Crying"). "Think I'm Going Mad", another song from the sessions, was released as the B-side to "She Was Hot" in 1984. A Waylon Jennings cover song sung by Richards, "We Had It All", was released on the 2011 deluxe Some Girls package.

== Packaging and artwork ==
The album cover for Emotional Rescue had concept origination, art direction and design by Peter Corriston with thermographic photos taken by British-born, Paris-based artist Roy Adzak using a thermal camera, a device that measures heat emissions. The original release came wrapped in a huge colour poster featuring more thermo-shots of the band with the album itself wrapped in a plastic bag. The original music video shot for "Emotional Rescue" also utilised the same type of shots of the band performing. A short time later a second video for "Emotional Rescue" was shot, directed by David Mallett (produced by Paul Flattery & Simon Fields) as well as one for "She's So Cold".

== Release and reception ==
Retrospective professional reviews
Review scores
Source	Rating
AllMusic	3.5/5 stars
Blender	4/5 stars
Christgau's Record Guide: The '80s	B+
MusicHound Rock	2/5 stars
The Rolling Stone Album Guide	4/5 stars
Smash Hits	5/10
Tom Hull – on the Web	A−

Released in June with the disco-infused hit title track as the lead single, Emotional Rescue was an immediate smash. The title track hit No. 3 on the Billboard Hot 100. The album gave the Rolling Stones their first UK No. 1 album since 1973's Goats Head Soup and spent seven weeks atop the US charts. The follow-up single "She's So Cold" was a top 30 hit while "Dance Pt. 1" reached No. 9 on Billboard's Dance chart.

Critical reception was relatively muted, with most reviewers considering the album somewhat formulaic and unambitious, particularly in contrast to its predecessor. Writing in Rolling Stone, Ariel Swartley stated that "as far as the music goes, 'familiar' is an understatement. There's hardly a melody here that you haven't heard from the Stones before". The Village Voice critic Robert Christgau summarized it as "an ordinary Stones album" in an essay accompanying the annual Pazz & Jop critics poll of 1980's best albums, in which Emotional Rescue finished 20th, a result which he deemed "so far out of the money" for "the world's greatest rock and roll band".

Retrospective assessments have been kinder, with several critics praising the band's performance, despite the sometimes lightweight material. Stephen Thomas Erlewine of AllMusic states that the album "may consist mainly of filler, but it's expertly written and performed filler". In Christgau's Record Guide: The '80s (1990), Christgau said that, while not "great", the album boasts a "mid-'60s [lyrical] charm" in "such tossed-off tropes as 'Where the Boys Go' and 'She's So Cold'", alongside a musical style "looser" than other less-than-great Stones records like It's Only Rock 'n Roll (1974): "[The music is] far more allusive and irregular and knowing: for better and worse its drive isn't so monolithic, and the bass comes front and center like Bill was James Jamerson."

In 1994, Emotional Rescue was remastered and reissued by Virgin Records, and again in 2009 by Universal Music. In 2011, it was released by Universal Music Enterprises in a Japanese-only SHM-SACD version. The 1994 remaster was initially released in a Collector's Edition CD, which replicated many elements of the original album packaging, including the colour poster.

== Track listing ==
All tracks are written by Mick Jagger and Keith Richards, except "Dance (Pt. 1)" written by Jagger, Richards, and Ron Wood.

Side one
No.	Title	Length
1.	"Dance (Pt. 1)"	4:22
2.	"Summer Romance"	3:14
3.	"Send It to Me"	3:44
4.	"Let Me Go"	3:49
5.	"Indian Girl"	4:21
Total length:		19:30

Side two
No.	Title	Length
1.	"Where the Boys Go"	3:28
2.	"Down in the Hole"	3:55
3.	"Emotional Rescue"	5:38
4.	"She's So Cold"	4:10
5.	"All About You"	4:17
Total length:		21:28

== Personnel ==
The Rolling Stones

- Mick Jagger – lead vocals (all but 10), electric guitar (2, 4, 6, 8–9), backing vocals (1–2, 6), electric piano (8), percussion (1)
- Keith Richards – electric guitar (all but 5), backing vocals (1–2, 6, 10), acoustic guitar (5), bass guitar (10), piano (10), lead vocals (10)
- Bill Wyman – bass guitar (3–5, 7, 9), string synthesizer (5, 8)
- Charlie Watts – drums (all tracks)
- Ronnie Wood – electric guitar (1–4, 6–7, 9–10), bass guitar (1–2, 6, 8), pedal steel (4–5, 9), backing vocals (6, 10), saxophone (1)

Additional personnel

- Ian Stewart – piano (2, 6), electric piano (8)
- Nicky Hopkins – synthesizers (3), piano (5)
- Sugar Blue – harmonica (3, 7)
- Bobby Keys – saxophone (1, 4, 8–10)
- Michael Shrieve – percussion (1, 3–4, 8–9)
- Max Romeo – backing vocals on "Dance (Pt. 1)"
- Jack Nitzsche – horn arrangement on "Indian Girl"

Technical

- Chris Kimsey – associate producer and engineer
- Snake Reynolds – assistant engineer
- Sean Fullan – assistant engineer
- Ted Jensen – mastering engineer

== Charts ==
=== Weekly charts ===
1980 weekly chart performance for Emotional Rescue
Chart (1980)	Peak position
Australian Albums (Kent Music Report)	4
Austrian Albums (Ö3 Austria)	2
Canada Top Albums/CDs (RPM)	1
Dutch Albums (Album Top 100)	1
Finland (The Official Finnish Charts)	13
German Albums (Offizielle Top 100)	6
Italian Albums (Musica e Dischi)	5
Japanese Albums (Oricon)	10
New Zealand Albums (RMNZ)	2
Norwegian Albums (VG-lista)	4
Spanish Albums (PROMUSICAE)	5
Swedish Albums (Sverigetopplistan)	1
UK Albums (Official Charts)	1
US Billboard 200	1

=== Year-end charts ===
1980 year-end chart performance for Emotional Rescue
Chart (1980)	Position
Australian Albums Chart	19
Austrian Albums Chart	9
Canada Top Albums/CDs (RPM)	8
Dutch Albums (Album Top 100)	20
German Albums (Offizielle Top 100)	36
Italian Albums (Musica e dischi)	19
New Zealand Albums (RMNZ)	15
US Billboard Pop Albums	35

== Certifications ==
Certifications for Emotional Rescue
Region	Certification	Certified units/sales
Australia (ARIA)	Platinum	50,000^{^}
France (SNEP)	Gold	100,000^{*}
Japan (RIAJ)	Gold	100,000^{^}
Netherlands (NVPI)	Gold	50,000^{^}
New Zealand (RMNZ)	Platinum	15,000^{^}
Spain (Promusicae)	Gold	50,000^{^}
United Kingdom (BPI)	Gold	100,000^{^}
United States (RIAA)	2× Platinum	2,000,000^{^}
^{*} Sales figures based on certification alone.^{^} Shipments figures based on certification alone.
