= She's So Cold =

Single by the Rolling Stones

from the album Emotional Rescue
- B-side: "Send It to Me"
- Released: September 1980
- Recorded: October 1979
- Genre: Dance rock; post-punk; new wave
- Length: 4:10
- Label: Rolling Stones
- Songwriter: Jagger/Richards
- Producer: The Glimmer Twins

Rolling Stones singles chronology
"Emotional Rescue" (1980)	"She's So Cold" (1980)	"Start Me Up" (1981)

Emotional Rescue track listing
- 10 tracks Side one: 1. "Dance (Pt. 1)"; 2. "Summer Romance"; 3. "Send It to Me"; 4. "Let Me Go"; 5. "Indian Girl"; Side two: 6. "Where the Boys Go"; 7. "Down in the Hole"; 8. "Emotional Rescue"; 9. "She's So Cold"; 10. "All About You"

"She's So Cold" is a song recorded by the Rolling Stones, released in September 1980 on the Emotional Rescue album. It was also issued as the second single from the album, with "Send It to Me" as the B-side. Due to the song's lyric "she's so goddamned cold", the promotional copy sent to radio stations had a "cleaned up version" on one side, with the "God damn version" on the other.

== Reception ==
Billboard called it a "torchy rock attack". Record World said that "Keith [Richards] and Mick [Jagger] have typical woman problems here, but they're hot as ever."

== Personnel ==
According to the authors Philippe Margotin and Jean-Michel Guesdon.

The Rolling Stones

- Mick Jagger – lead vocals
- Keith Richards – rhythm guitar
- Ronnie Wood – rhythm and slide guitar, pedal steel guitar
- Bill Wyman – bass guitar
- Charlie Watts – drums

Additional musician

- Bobby Keys – saxophone

Technical

- The Glimmer Twins – producers
- Chris Kimsey – associate producer, engineer
- Sean Fullan – assistant engineer
- Brad Samuelsohn – assistant engineer
- Ron "Snake" Reynolds – assistant engineer
- Jon Smith – assistant engineer

Note: Margotin and Guesdon are unsure if Jagger played guitar.

== Charts ==
The single peaked at number 33 in the UK Singles Chart and number 26 on the US Billboard Hot 100 chart in November 1980. Along with the tracks "Dance" and "Emotional Rescue", "She's So Cold" went to number 9 on the Disco Top 100 chart.

Chart (1980)	Peak position
Australia (Kent Music Report)	49
Canada Top Singles (RPM)	11
Ireland (IRMA)	24
Netherlands (Single Top 100)	23
New Zealand (Recorded Music NZ)	26
UK Singles (Official Charts)	33
US Billboard Hot 100	26
