= Emotional Rescue (song) =

Single by the Rolling Stones

from the album Emotional Rescue
- B-side: "Down in the Hole"
- Released: 20 June 1980
- Recorded: 1–19 October 1979
- Genre: Dance-rock; Eurodisco; R&B
- Length: 5:39 (LP version); 4:18 (Promo 7" Version"); 3:42 (Forty Licks/GRRR! edit)
- Label: Rolling Stones Records
- Songwriter: Jagger/Richards
- Producer: The Glimmer Twins

The Rolling Stones singles chronology
"Shattered" (1978)	"Emotional Rescue" (1980)	"She's So Cold" (1980)

Emotional Rescue track listing
- 10 tracks Side one: 1. "Dance (Pt. 1)"; 2. "Summer Romance"; 3. "Send It to Me"; 4. "Let Me Go"; 5. "Indian Girl"; Side two: 6. "Where the Boys Go"; 7. "Down in the Hole"; 8. "Emotional Rescue"; 9. "She's So Cold"; 10. "All About You"

Music video
- "Emotional Rescue" - OFFICIAL PROMO on YouTube

"Emotional Rescue" is a song by the English rock and roll band, the Rolling Stones. It was written by Mick Jagger and Keith Richards and is included on their 1980 album Emotional Rescue.

Given the fact that Keith Richards was becoming (relatively) clean, he was reportedly starting to demand to be involved with the business decisions that Mick Jagger had been taking care of throughout the past decade. This caused a rift between the two, and they rarely were in the studio at the same time. Mick would record in the early evening, and Keith would stroll in late at night.

== Composition and writing ==
Mick Jagger wrote the song on an electric piano and from the beginning it was sung in falsetto (similar to the Bee Gees' disco tracks or Marvin Gaye's lead vocal on his 1977 hit "Got to Give It Up"). When the song was brought into the studio they kept the electric piano and falsetto lead. With Ronnie Wood on bass and Charlie Watts on drums they worked out the song. They then added the saxophone part played by Bobby Keys. Bass guitarist Bill Wyman plays synthesizer on the record, while Jagger and Ian Stewart play electric piano. Wyman's synthesizer can be heard faintly during the verses on the right channel/speaker and plays a simple pattern of a few notes using a string-synth set up.

Jagger said the song was about "a girl who's in some sort of manhood problems", not that she was going crazy but she's "just a little bit screwed up and he wants to be the one to help her out".

Released as the album's lead single on 20 June 1980, "Emotional Rescue" was well received by some fans. Other fans of the Rolling Stones' work took note of the change in direction and were disappointed by it. Reaching No. 9 on the UK Singles Chart and No. 3 on both the Billboard and Cash Box charts, "Emotional Rescue" became popular enough to feature on all of the band's later compilation albums.

Billboard said that "The hook is settled in the offbeat, but once it's repeated the tune becomes addicting." Cash Box said that it was influenced by the music of "Curtis Mayfield and the Impressions, Thom Bell and (on the UK side) Eric Burdon," but is brought up-to-date by the "heavy beat." Record World said that "Jagger sings falsetto and street talks while the band cooks a raw, funky dance mix."

Despite touring extensively since the song's release in 1980, the Stones had never performed the track in concert until May 3, 2013, when the band debuted the song in their set list with a slightly different arrangement, during the first show of the 2013 leg of the 50 & Counting... tour, in Los Angeles, California.

== Music video ==
Two music videos were produced to promote the single; one shot on traditional video, directed by David Mallet and one shot with thermal imaging, directed by Adam Friedman.

== Personnel ==
According to the authors Philippe Margotin and Jean-Michel Guesdon.

The Rolling Stones

- Mick Jagger – lead vocals, Wurlitzer electronic piano
- Keith Richards – rhythm and lead guitar
- Ronnie Wood – bass guitar
- Bill Wyman – synthesiser
- Charlie Watts – drums

Additional personnel

- Nicky Hopkins or Ian Stewart – electric piano
- Bobby Keys – saxophone
- Michael Shrieve – percussion

Technical

- The Glimmer Twins – producers
- Chris Kimsey – associate producer, engineer
- Sean Fullan – assistant engineer
- Brad Samuelsohn – assistant engineer
- Ron "Snake" Reynolds – assistant engineer
- Jon Smith – assistant engineer

Note: Margotin and Guesdon are unsure if Hopkins played the electric piano part.

== Charts ==
=== Weekly charts ===
Chart (1980)	Peak position
Australia (Kent Music Report)	8
Austria (Ö3 Austria Top 40)	9
Canada (CBC)	1
Canada (RPM)	1
Belgium (Ultratop 50 Flanders)	16
Germany (GfK)	15
Netherlands (Single Top 100)	5
New Zealand (Recorded Music NZ)	16
Switzerland (Schweizer Hitparade)	11
UK Singles (Official Charts)	9
US Billboard Hot 100	3
US Cashbox Top 100	3
US KFI Top 40 (Los Angeles)	1
US WLS Top 40 (Chicago)	3

=== Year end charts ===
Year-end chart (1980)	Rank
Australia (Kent Music Report)	61
US Top Pop Singles (Billboard)	53
