= List of songs recorded by the Rolling Stones =

Songs recorded by English rock band

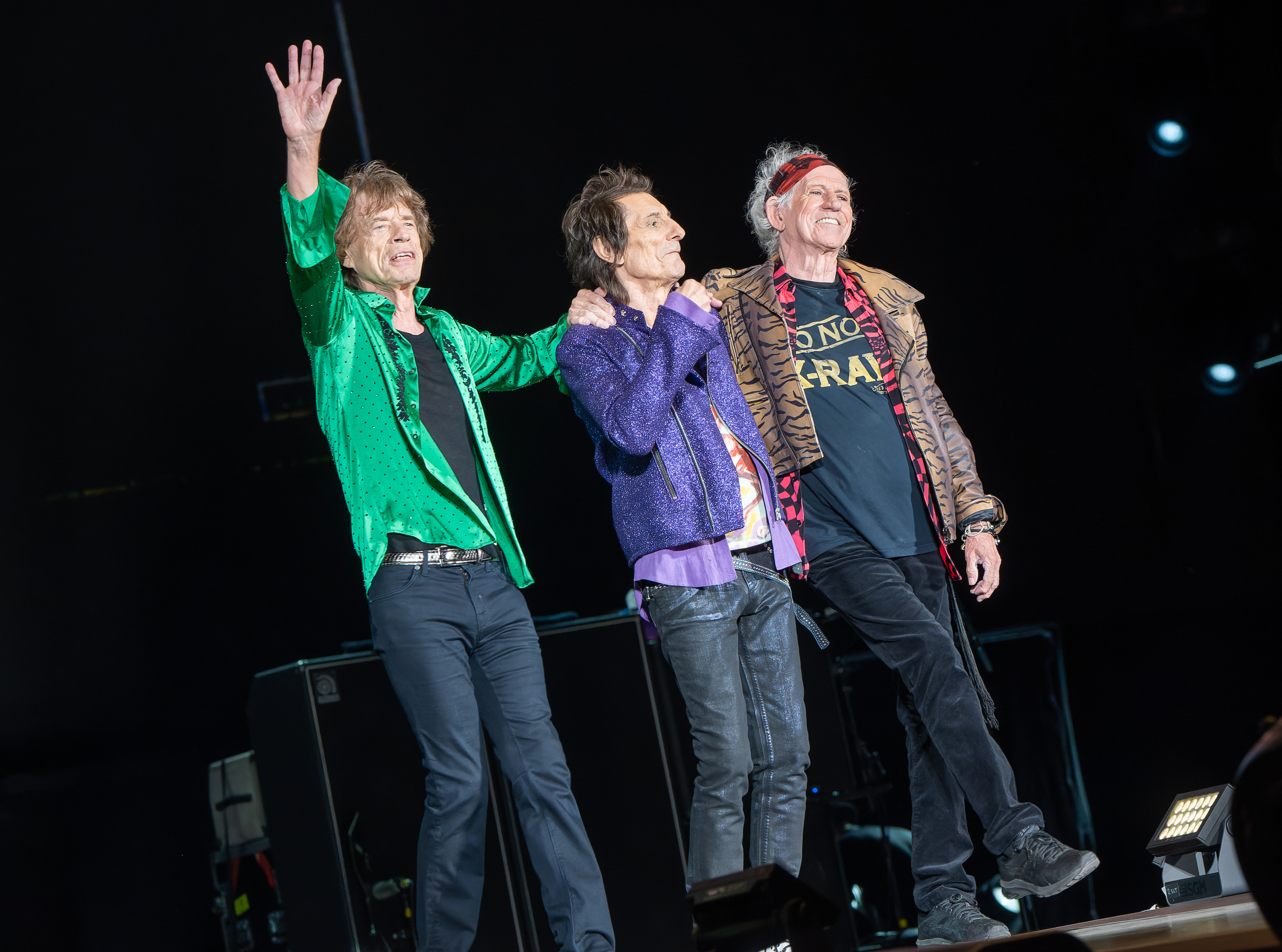
The Rolling Stones in 2022

The Rolling Stones are an English rock band formed in 1962. They have released 27 studio albums through 2023 and recorded 422 songs. The original lineup consisted of multi-instrumentalist Brian Jones, lead vocalist Mick Jagger, guitarist Keith Richards, bass guitarist Bill Wyman, drummer Charlie Watts, and keyboardist Ian Stewart. Stewart was dismissed from the lineup in 1963 but continued to serve as their road manager and de facto keyboard player. Following Jones' dismissal in 1969, Mick Taylor took over lead guitar duties until 1974, when he quit the group over issues of songwriting credits. He was replaced by ex-Faces guitarist Ronnie Wood. The band were inducted into the Rock and Roll Hall of Fame in 1989. The group continues to write, tour, and produce to this day.

== Songs ==
Name of song, year recorded, year released, original release, songwriter(s) and lead vocalist
Title	Year recorded	Year released	Original release	Songwriter(s)	Lead vocal(s)
"19th Nervous Breakdown"	1965	1966	Big Hits (High Tide and Green Grass)	Jagger/Richards	Jagger
"100 Years Ago"	1972	1973	Goats Head Soup	Jagger/Richards	Jagger
"2000 Light Years from Home"	1967	1967	Their Satanic Majesties Request	Jagger/Richards	Jagger
"2000 Man"	1967	1967	Their Satanic Majesties Request	Jagger/Richards	Jagger
"2120 South Michigan Avenue"	1964	1964	Five by Five (EP) (UK); 12 X 5 (US)	Nanker Phelge (Note: Nanker Phelge is the collective name for Mick Jagger, Brian Jones, Keith Richards, Charlie Watts, Bill Wyman and Andrew Loog Oldham collaborative composition. The ASCAP files for the very earliest Nanker Phelge compositions also list early Rolling Stones member Ian Stewart as a co-author covered by the pseudonym.)	none (instrumental)
"Aftermath"	1965	–	bootleg recording/outtake	Nanker Phelge	Jagger
"Ain't That Lovin' You, Baby" (live)	1964	2017	On Air	Jimmy Reed	Jagger
"Ain't Too Proud to Beg"	1973	1974	It's Only Rock 'n Roll	Norman Whitfield/Eddie Holland	Jagger
"All About You"	1979	1980	Emotional Rescue	Jagger/Richards	Richards
"All Down the Line"	1972	1972	Exile on Main St.	Jagger/Richards	Jagger
"All of Your Love"	2015	2016	Blue & Lonesome	Magic Sam	Jagger
"All Sold Out"	1966	1967	Between the Buttons	Jagger/Richards	Jagger
"All the Rage"	1972	2020	Goats Head Soup (reissue)	Jagger/Richards	Jagger
"All the way Down"	1982	1983	Undercover	Jagger/Richards	Jagger
"Almost Hear You Sigh"	1989	1989	Steel Wheels	Jagger/Richards/Jordan	Jagger
"Already Over Me"	1997	1997	Bridges to Babylon	Jagger/Richards	Jagger
"Always Suffering"	1997	1997	Bridges to Babylon	Jagger/Richards	Jagger
"And Mr. Spector And Mr. Pitney Came Too"	1964	–	bootleg recording/outtake	Nanker Phelge/Phil Spector	none (instrumental)
"Andrew's Blues (Song for Andrew)"	1964	–	bootleg recording/outtake	Nanker Phelge	Gene Pitney
"Angie"	1972	1973	Goats Head Soup	Jagger/Richards	Jagger
"Angry"	2019, 2020, 2022–2023	2023	Hackney Diamonds	Jagger/Richards/Andrew Watt	Jagger
"Anybody Seen My Baby?"	1997	1997	Bridges to Babylon	Jagger/Richards/Lang/Mink	Jagger
"Anyway You Look At It"	1997	1998	B-side of "Saint of Me"; Rarities 1971–2003	Jagger/Richards	Jagger
"Around and Around"	1964	1964	Five by Five (EP) (UK); 12 X 5 (US)	Chuck Berry	Jagger
"As Tears Go By"	1965	1965	Big Hits (High Tide and Green Grass) (UK); December's Children (And Everybody's) (US)	Jagger/Richards/Loog Oldham	Jagger
"Baby Break It Down"	1994	1994	Voodoo Lounge	Jagger/Richards	Jagger
"Back in Your Life"	2019, 2021, 2022–2023, 2025-2026	2026	Foreign Tongues	Jagger/Richards/Andrew Watt	Jagger
"Back of My Hand"	2004	2005	A Bigger Bang	Jagger/Richards	Jagger
"Back Street Girl"	1966	1967	Between the Buttons (UK); Flowers (US)	Jagger/Richards	Jagger
"Back to Zero"	1985	1986	Dirty Work	Jagger/Richards/Leavell	Jagger
"Bad Luck Hideaway"	2021	2026	Foreign Tongues (iTunes bonus track)	Jagger/Richards/Andrew Watt	Jagger/Richards
"Beast of Burden"	1977	1978	Some Girls	Jagger/Richards	Jagger
"Beautiful Delilah"	2019, 2021, 2022–2023, 2025-2026	2026	Foreign Tongues	Chuck Berry	Jagger
"Before They Make Me Run"	1978	1978	Some Girls	Jagger/Richards	Richards
"Biggest Mistake"	2004	2005	A Bigger Bang	Jagger/Richards	Jagger
"Bitch"	1970	1971	Sticky Fingers	Jagger/Richards	Jagger
"Bite My Head Off"	2019, 2020, 2022–2023	2023	Hackney Diamonds	Jagger/Richards	Jagger
"Black Limousine"	1980	1981	Tattoo You	Jagger/Richards/Wood	Jagger
"Blinded by Love"	1989	1989	Steel Wheels	Jagger/Richards	Jagger
"Blinded by Rainbows"	1994	1994	Voodoo Lounge	Jagger/Richards	Jagger
"Blood Red Wine"	1968	–	bootleg recording/outtake	Jagger/Richards	Jagger
"Blues Jam"	1975	2025	Black and Blue (Super Deluxe)	Jagger/Richards/Wyman/Watts/Wood	none (instrumental)
"Blue and Lonesome"	2015	2016	Blue & Lonesome	Little Walter	Jagger
"Blue Turns to Grey"	1965	1965	Stone Age (UK); December's Children (And Everybody's) (US)	Jagger/Richards	Jagger
"Brand New Car"	1994	1994	Voodoo Lounge	Jagger/Richards	Jagger
"Break the Spell"	1989	1989	Steel Wheels	Jagger/Richards	Jagger
"Bright Lights, Big City"	1963	2012	GRRR! (Super Deluxe)	Jimmy Reed	Jagger
"Brown Sugar"	1969	1971	Sticky Fingers	Jagger/Richards	Jagger
"Bye Bye Johnny"	1963	1964	The Rolling Stones (EP) (UK); More Hot Rocks (Big Hits & Fazed Cookies) (US)	Chuck Berry	Jagger
"Can I Get a Witness"	1964	1964	The Rolling Stones (UK); England's Newest Hit Makers (US)	Holland-Dozier-Holland	Jagger
"Can You Hear the Music"	1973	1973	Goats Head Soup	Jagger/Richards	Jagger
"Can't Be Seen"	1989	1989	Steel Wheels	Jagger/Richards	Richards
"Can't You Hear Me Knocking"	1970	1971	Sticky Fingers	Jagger/Richards	Jagger
"Carol"	1964	1964	The Rolling Stones (UK); England's Newest Hit Makers (US)	Chuck Berry	Jagger
"Casino Boogie"	1971–1972	1972	Exile on Main St.	Jagger/Richards	Jagger, Richards
"Champagne and Reefer" (live)	2006	2008	Shine a Light	Muddy Waters	Jagger
"Chantilly Lace" (live)	1982	2021	Tattoo You (reissue)	J. P. Richardson	Jagger
"Cherry Oh Baby"	1975	1976	Black and Blue	Eric Donaldson	Jagger
"Child of the Moon"	1968	1968	More Hot Rocks (Big Hits & Fazed Cookies)	Jagger/Richards	Jagger
"Chuck Berry Style Jam"	1975–1976	2025	Black and Blue (Super Deluxe)	Jagger/Richards/Wyman/Watts/Wood	none (instrumental)
"Citadel"	1967	1967	Their Satanic Majesties Request	Jagger/Richards	Jagger
"Claudine"	1978	2011	Some Girls (reissue)	Jagger/Richards	Jagger
"Come On"	1963	1963	Big Hits (High Tide and Green Grass) (UK) More Hot Rocks (Big Hits & Fazed Cookies) (US)	Chuck Berry	Jagger
"Come to the Ball"	1972–1981	2021	Tattoo You (reissue)	Jagger/Richards	Jagger
"Coming Down Again"	1972	1973	Goats Head Soup	Jagger/Richards	Richards
"Commit a Crime"	2015	2016	Blue & Lonesome	Howlin' Wolf	Jagger
"Complicated"	1966	1967	Between the Buttons	Jagger/Richards	Jagger
"Confessin' the Blues"	1964	1964	Five by Five (EP) (UK); 12 X 5 (US)	Jay McShann/Walter Brown	Jagger
"Congratulations"	1964	1964	Singles Collection: The London Years (UK); 12 X 5 (US)	Jagger/Richards	Jagger
"Connection"	1966	1967	Between the Buttons	Jagger/Richards	Jagger, Richards
"Continental Drift"	1989	1989	Steel Wheels	Jagger/Richards	Jagger
"Cops and Robbers"	1964	2012	GRRR! (Super Deluxe)	Kent Harris	Jagger
"Cook Cook Blues"	1989	1989	The Singles 1971–2006	Jagger/Richards	Jagger
"Cool, Calm & Collected"	1966	1967	Between the Buttons	Jagger/Richards	Jagger
"Corinna" (live)	1997	1998	No Security	Taj Mahal/Jesse Ed Davis III	Jagger, Taj Mahal
"Country Honk"	1969	1969	Let it Bleed	Jagger/Richards	Jagger
"Crackin' Up" (live)	1977	1977	Love You Live	Bo Diddley	Jagger
"Crazy Mama"	1975	1976	Black and Blue	Jagger/Richards	Jagger
"Criss Cross"	1973	2020	Goats Head Soup (reissue)	Jagger/Richards/Taylor	Jagger
"Crushed Pearl"	1985	–	bootleg recording/outtake	Jagger/Richards	Richards
"Cry to Me"	1965	1965	Out of Our Heads	Bert Berns	Jagger
"Covered in You"	2019, 2021, 2022–2023, 2025-2026	2026	Foreign Tongues	Jagger/Richards/Matt Clifford	Jagger
"Dance (Pt. 1)"	1979	1980	Emotional Rescue	Jagger/Richards/Wood	Jagger
"Dance Little Sister"	1974	1974	It's Only Rock 'n Roll	Jagger/Richards	Jagger
"Dancing in the Light"	1972	2010	Exile on Main St. (reissue)	Jagger/Richards	Jagger
"Dancing with Mr. D"	1972	1973	Goats Head Soup	Jagger/Richards	Jagger
"Dandelion"	1967	1967	Through the Past, Darkly (Big Hits Vol. 2)	Jagger/Richards	Jagger
"Dead Flowers"	1969	1971	Sticky Fingers	Jagger/Richards	Jagger
"Dear Doctor"	1968	1968	Beggars Banquet	Jagger/Richards	Jagger
"Deep Love"	1985	–	bootleg recording/outtake	Jagger/Richards	Richards
"Depending on You"	2019, 2020, 2022–2023	2023	Hackney Diamonds	Jagger/Richards/Watt	Jagger
"Diddley Daddy"	1963	2012	GRRR! (Super Deluxe)	Bo Diddley/Harvey Fuqua	Jagger
"Dirty Work"	1985	1986	Dirty Work	Jagger/Richards/Wood	Jagger
"Divine Intervention"	2019, 2021, 2022–2023, 2025-2026	2026	Foreign Tongues	Jagger/Richards	Jagger
"Do You Think I Really Care?"	1977	2011	Some Girls (reissue)	Jagger/Richards	Jagger
"Doncha Bother Me"	1965	1966	Aftermath	Jagger/Richards	Jagger
"Don't Be a Stranger"	1978	2011	Some Girls (reissue)	Jagger/Richards	Jagger
"Don't Stop"	2002	2002	Forty Licks	Jagger/Richards	Jagger
"Don't You Lie to Me"	1964	1975	Metamorphosis	Tampa Red	Jagger
"Doo Doo Doo Doo Doo (Heartbreaker)"	1972	1973	Goats Head Soup	Jagger/Richards	Jagger
"Doom and Gloom"	2012	2012	GRRR!	Jagger/Richards	Jagger
"Down Home Girl"	1964	1965	The Rolling Stones No. 2 (UK); The Rolling Stones, Now! (US)	Jerry Leiber/Artie Butler	Jagger
"Down in the Bottom"	1995	2016	Totally Stripped	Willie Dixon	Jagger
"Down in the Hole"	1979	1980	Emotional Rescue	Jagger/Richards	Jagger
"Down the Road a Piece"	1964	1965	The Rolling Stones No. 2 (UK); The Rolling Stones, Now! (US)	Don Raye	Jagger
"Downtown Suzie"	1968	1975	Metamorphosis	Bill Wyman	Jagger
"Dreamy Skies"	2019, 2020, 2022–2023	2023	Hackney Diamonds	Jagger/Richards	Jagger
"Drift Away"	1973	2021	Tattoo You (reissue)	Mentor Williams	Jagger
"Driving Me Too Hard"	2019, 2020, 2022–2023	2023	Hackney Diamonds	Jagger/Richards	Jagger
"Driving Too Fast"	2005	2005	A Bigger Bang	Jagger/Richards	Jagger
"Each and Everyday of the Year"	1964	1975	Metamorphosis	Jagger/Richards	Jagger
"Emotional Rescue"	1979	1980	Emotional Rescue	Jagger/Richards	Jagger
"Empty Heart"	1964	1964	Five by Five (EP) (UK); 12 X 5 (US)	Nanker Phelge	Jagger
"Everybody Knows About My Good Thing"	2015	2016	Blue & Lonesome	Miles Grayson/Lermon Horton	Jagger
"Everybody Needs Somebody to Love"	1964	1965	The Rolling Stones No. 2 (UK); The Rolling Stones, Now! (US)	Jerry Wexler/Bert Berns/Solomon Burke	Jagger
"Everything is Turning to Gold"	1978	1981	Sucking in the Seventies	Jagger/Richards/Wood	Jagger
"Exile on Main Street Blues"	1972	1972	promotional song	Jagger/Richards	Jagger
"Factory Girl"	1968	1968	Beggars Banquet	Jagger/Richards	Jagger
"Family"	1968	1975	Metamorphosis	Jagger/Richards	Jagger
"Fancyman Blues"	1989	1989	The Singles 1971–2006	Jagger/Richards	Jagger
"Fannie Mae" (live)	1965	2017	On Air	Buster Brown/Clarence L. Lewis/Bobby Robinson	Jagger
"Far Away Eyes"	1977	1978	Some Girls	Jagger/Richards	Jagger
"Fast Talking, Slow Walking"	1972–1981	2021	Tattoo You (reissue)	Jagger/Richards	Jagger
"Feel On Baby"	1983	1983	Undercover	Jagger/Richards	Jagger
"Fight"	1985	1986	Dirty Work	Jagger/Richards/Wood	Jagger
"Fiji Jim"	1978	2021	Tattoo You (reissue)	Jagger/Richards	Jagger
"Fingerprint File"	1974	1974	It's Only Rock 'n Roll	Jagger/Richards	Jagger
"Flight 505"	1965	1966	Aftermath	Jagger/Richards	Jagger
"Flip the Switch"	1997	1997	Bridges to Babylon	Jagger/Richards	Jagger
"Following the River"	1972	2010	Exile on Main St. (reissue)	Jagger/Richards	Jagger
"Fool to Cry"	1974	1976	Black and Blue	Jagger/Richards	Jagger
"Fortune Teller"	1963	1966	More Hot Rocks (Big Hits & Fazed Cookies) (UK); Got Live If You Want It! (US)	Allen Toussaint (under the pseudonym Naomi Neville)	Jagger
"Freeway Jam"	1975–1976	2025	Black and Blue (Super Deluxe)	Jagger/Richards/Wyman/Watts/Wood	none (instrumental)
"Get Close"	2019, 2020, 2022–2023	2023	Hackney Diamonds	Jagger/Richards/Watt	Jagger
"Get Off of My Cloud"	1965	1965	Big Hits (High Tide and Green Grass) (UK); December's Children (And Everybody's) (US)	Jagger/Richards	Jagger
"Get Up, Stand Up" (live)	2005	2012	Light the Fuse	Bob Marley/Peter Tosh	Jagger
"Gimme Shelter"	1969	1969	Let It Bleed	Jagger/Richards	Jagger, Merry Clayton
"Godzi"	1965	–	bootleg recording/outtake	Nanker Phelge	Jagger
"Goin' Home"	1965	1966	Aftermath	Jagger/Richards	Jagger
"Going to a Go-Go" (live)	1981	1982	Still Life	Smokey Robinson/Pete Moore/Bobby Rogers/Marvin Tarplin	Jagger
"Gomper"	1967	1967	Their Satanic Majesties Request	Jagger/Richards	Jagger
"Good Time Woman"	1970	2010	Exile on Main St. (reissue)	Jagger/Richards	Jagger
"Good Times"	1965	1965	Out of Our Heads	Sam Cooke	Jagger
"Good Times, Bad Times"	1964	1964	Singles Collection: The London Years (UK); 12 X 5 (US)	Jagger/Richards	Jagger
"Goodbye Girl"	1964	–	bootleg recording/outtake	Wyman	Jagger
"Gotta Get Away"	1965	1965	Out of Our Heads (UK); December's Children (And Everybody's) (US)	Jagger/Richards	Jagger
"Grown Up Wrong"	1964	1964	The Rolling Stones No. 2 (UK); 12 X 5 (US)	Jagger/Richards	Jagger
"Gunface"	1997	1997	Bridges to Babylon	Jagger/Richards	Jagger
"Had it with You"	1985	1986	Dirty Work	Jagger/Richards/Wood	Jagger
"Hand of Fate"	1974	1975	Black and Blue	Jagger/Richards	Jagger
"Hang Fire"	1981	1981	Tattoo You	Jagger/Richards	Jagger
"Happy"	1971	1972	Exile on Main St.	Jagger/Richards	Richards
"Harlem Shuffle"	1985	1986	Dirty Work	Bob Relf/Ernest Nelson	Jagger
"Hate to See You Go"	2015	2016	Blue & Lonesome	Little Walter	Jagger
"Have You Seen Your Mother, Baby, Standing in the Shadow?"	1966	1966	Big Hits (High Tide and Green Grass) (UK); Flowers (US)	Jagger/Richards	Jagger
"Heart of Stone"	1964	1964	Out of Our Heads (UK); The Rolling Stones, Now! (US)	Jagger/Richards	Jagger
"Hearts For Sale"	1989	1989	Steel Wheels	Jagger/Richards	Jagger
"Heaven"	1981	1981	Tattoo You	Jagger/Richards	Jagger
"Hey Negrita"	1975	1975	Black and Blue	Jagger/Richards	Jagger
"Hide Your Love"	1973	1973	Goats Head Soup	Jagger/Richards	Jagger
"High and Dry"	1966	1966	Aftermath	Jagger/Richards	Jagger
"Highway Child"	1968	–	bootleg recording/outtake	Jagger/Richards	Jagger
"Highwire"	1991	1991	Flashpoint	Jagger/Richards	Jagger
"Hi-Heel Sneakers" (live)	1964	2017	On Air	Tommy Tucker	Jagger
"Hitch Hike"	1965	1965	Out of Our Heads	Marvin Gaye/William "Mickey" Stevenson/Clarence Paul	Jagger
"Hit Me in the Head"	2019, 2021, 2022–2023, 2025-2026	2026	Foreign Tongues	Jagger/Richards	Jagger
"Hold Back"	1985	1986	Dirty Work	Jagger/Richards	Jagger
"Hold On to Your Hat"	1989	1989	Steel Wheels	Jagger/Richards	Jagger
"Honest I Do"	1964	1964	The Rolling Stones (UK); England's Newest Hit Makers (US)	Jimmy Reed	Jagger
"Honest Man"	1993	–	bootleg recording/outtake	Jagger/Richards	Jagger
"Honey What's Wrong" (a.k.a. "Baby, What's Wrong")	1963	2012	GRRR! (Super Deluxe)	Jimmy Reed	Jagger
"Honky Tonk Women"	1969	1969	Through the Past, Darkly (Big Hits Vol. 2)	Jagger/Richards	Jagger
"Hoo Doo Blues"	2015	2016	Blue & Lonesome	Otis Hicks/Jerry West	Jagger
"Hot Stuff"	1975	1976	Black and Blue	Jagger/Richards	Jagger
"Hound Dog"	1978	–	bootleg recording/outtake	Jerry Leiber/Mike Stoller	Jagger
"How Can I Stop"	1997	1997	Bridges to Babylon	Jagger/Richards	Richards
"Hurricane"	2002	2005	Vintage Vinos	Jagger/Richards	Richards
"I Ain't Superstitious"	1978	–	bootleg recording/outtake	Willie Dixon	Jagger
"I Am Waiting"	1965	1966	Aftermath	Jagger/Richards	Jagger
"I Can't Be Satisfied"	1964	1965	The Rolling Stones No. 2 (UK); More Hot Rocks (Big Hits & Fazed Cookies) (US)	Muddy Waters	Jagger
"(I Can't Get No) Satisfaction"	1965	1965	Big Hits (High Tide and Green Grass) (UK); Out of Our Heads (US)	Jagger/Richards	Jagger
"I Can't Quit You Baby"	2015	2016	Blue & Lonesome	Willie Dixon	Jagger
"I Don't Know Why"	1969	1975	Metamorphosis	Stevie Wonder/Paul Riser/Don Hunter/Lula Hardaway	Jagger
"I Go Wild"	1993	1994	Voodoo Lounge	Jagger/Richards	Jagger
"I Got the Blues"	1970	1971	Sticky Fingers	Jagger/Richards	Jagger
"I Gotta Go"	2015	2016	Blue & Lonesome	Little Walter	Jagger
"I Just Want to Make Love to You"	1964	1964	The Rolling Stones (UK); England's Newest Hit Makers (US)	Willie Dixon	Jagger
"I Just Want to See His Face"	1971	1972	Exile on Main St.	Jagger/Richards	Jagger
"I Love Ladies"	1976	2025	Black and Blue (Super Deluxe)	Keith Richards	Jagger
"I Love You Too Much"	1978	2011	Some Girls (reissue)	Jagger/Richards	Jagger
"I Think I'm Going Mad"	1979	1984	B-side of "She Was Hot"; The Singles 1971–2006	Jagger/Richards	Jagger
"I Wanna Be Your Man"	1963	1963	Milestones (UK); Singles Collection: The London Years (US)	Lennon–McCartney	Jagger
"I Want to Be Loved (version 1)"	1963	2012	GRRR! (Super Deluxe)	Willie Dixon	Jagger
"I Want to Be Loved (version 2)"	1963	1963	Singles Collection: The London Years	Willie Dixon	Jagger
"I'd Much Rather Be with the Boys"	1965	1975	Metamorphosis	Loog Oldham/Richards	Jagger
"I'm a King Bee"	1964	1964	The Rolling Stones (UK); England's Newest Hit Makers (US)	Slim Harpo	Jagger
"I'm Alright" (live)	1965	1965	Got Live If You Want It! (EP)	Bo Diddley	Jagger, Richards
"I'm Free"	1965	1965	Out of Our Heads (UK); December's Children (And Everybody's) (US)	Jagger/Richards	Jagger
"I'm Going Down"	1969	1975	Metamorphosis	Jagger/Richards/Taylor	Jagger
"I'm Gonna Drive"	1994	1994	The Singles 1971–2006	Jagger/Richards	Jagger
"I'm Moving On" (live)	1965	1965	Got Live If You Want It! (EP) (UK); December's Children (And Everybody's) (US)	Hank Snow	Jagger
"I'm Not Signifying"	1971	2010	Exile on Main St. (reissue)	Jagger/Richards	Jagger
"I've Been Loving You Too Long"	1965	1966	Gimme Shelter (UK); Got Live If You Want It! (US)	Otis Redding/Jerry Butler	Jagger
"If I Was a Dancer (Dance Pt. 2)"	1978	1980	Sucking in the Seventies	Jagger/Richards/Wood	Jagger
"If You Can't Rock Me"	1973	1974	It's Only Rock 'n Roll	Jagger/Richards	Jagger
"If You Let Me"	1966	1975	Metamorphosis	Jagger/Richards	Jagger
"If You Need Me"	1964	1964	Five by Five (EP) (UK); 12 X 5 (US)	Wilson Pickett/Robert Bateman	Jagger
"If You Really Want to Be My Friend"	1973	1974	It's Only Rock 'n Roll	Jagger/Richards	Jagger
"In Another Land"	1967	1967	Their Satanic Majesties Request	Bill Wyman	Wyman
"Indian Girl"	1979	1980	Emotional Rescue	Jagger/Richards	Jagger
"Infamy"	2005	2005	A Bigger Bang	Jagger/Richards	Richards
"In the Stars"	2019, 2021, 2022–2023, 2025-2026	2026	Foreign Tongues	Jagger/Richards	Jagger
"It Must Be Hell"	1983	1983	Undercover	Jagger/Richards	Jagger
"It Should Be You"	1963	–	bootleg recording/outtake	Jagger/Richards	Jagger
"It Won't Take Long"	2004	2005	A Bigger Bang	Jagger/Richards	Jagger
"It's All Over Now"	1964	1964	Big Hits (High Tide and Green Grass) (UK); 12 X 5 (US)	Bobby Womack/Shirley Womack	Jagger
"It's a Lie"	1972–1981	2021	Tattoo You (reissue)	Jagger/Richards	Jagger
"It's Not Easy"	1965	1966	Aftermath	Jagger/Richards	Jagger
"It's Only Rock 'n Roll (But I Like It)"	1973	1974	It's Only Rock 'n Roll	Jagger/Richards	Jagger
"Jealous Lover"	2019, 2021, 2022–2023, 2025-2026	2026	Foreign Tongues	Jagger/Richards	Jagger
"Jig-Saw Puzzle"	1968	1968	Beggars Banquet	Jagger/Richards	Jagger
"Jiving Sister Fanny"	1969	1975	Metamorphosis	Jagger/Richards	Jagger
"Jump on Top of Me"	1993	1993	The Singles 1971–2006	Jagger/Richards	Jagger
"Jumpin' Jack Flash"	1968	1968	Through the Past, Darkly (Big Hits Vol. 2)	Jagger/Richards	Jagger
"Just Like I Treat You"	2015	2016	Blue & Lonesome	Willie Dixon	Jagger
"Just My Imagination (Running Away with Me)"	1977	1978	Some Girls	Norman Whitfield/Barrett Strong	Jagger
"Just Your Fool"	2015	2016	Blue & Lonesome	Buddy Johnson	Jagger
"Keep Up Blues"	1977	2011	Some Girls (reissue)	Jagger/Richards	Jagger
"Key to the Highway"	1985	1986	Dirty Work	Big Bill Broonzy/Charles Segar	none (instrumental)
"Keys to Your Love"	2002	2002	Forty Licks	Jagger/Richards	Jagger
"Lady Jane"	1966	1966	Aftermath	Jagger/Richards	Jagger
"The Lantern"	1967	1967	Their Satanic Majesties Request	Jagger/Richards	Jagger
"The Last Time"	1965	1965	Big Hits (High Tide and Green Grass) (UK); Out of Our Heads (US)	Jagger/Richards	Jagger
"Laugh, I Nearly Died"	2005	2005	A Bigger Bang	Jagger/Richards	Jagger
"Let it Bleed"	1969	1969	Let It Bleed	Jagger/Richards	Jagger
"Let it Loose"	1971	1972	Exile on Main St.	Jagger/Richards	Jagger
"Let it Rock" (live)	1971	1971	Rarities 1971–2003	Chuck Berry	Jagger
"Let Me Down Slow"	2004	2005	A Bigger Bang	Jagger/Richards	Jagger
"Let Me Go"	1979	1980	Emotional Rescue	Jagger/Richards	Jagger
"Let's Spend the Night Together"	1966	1967	Through the Past, Darkly (Big Hits Vol. 2) (UK); Between the Buttons (US)	Jagger/Richards	Jagger
"Lies"	1977	1978	Some Girls	Jagger/Richards	Jagger
"Like a Rolling Stone" (live)	1995	1995	Stripped	Bob Dylan	Jagger
"Linda Lu"	1979	–	bootleg recording/outtake	Ray Sharpe	Jagger
"Little Baby" (live)	1995	1995	Stripped	Willie Dixon	Jagger
"Little by Little"	1964	1964	The Rolling Stones (UK); England's Newest Hit Makers (US)	Nanker Phelge/Phil Spector/Ian Stewart	Jagger
"Little Queenie" (live)	1969	1970	Get Yer Ya-Ya's Out! The Rolling Stones in Concert	Chuck Berry	Jagger
"Little Rain"	2015	2016	Blue & Lonesome	Ewart G.Abner Jr./Jimmy Reed	Jagger
"Little Red Rooster"	1964	1964	Big Hits (High Tide and Green Grass) (UK); The Rolling Stones, Now! (US)	Willie Dixon	Jagger
"Little T&A"	1979	1981	Tattoo You	Jagger/Richards	Richards
"Live By the Sword"	2019, 2020, 2022–2023	2023	Hackney Diamonds	Jagger/Richards	Jagger
"Live with Me"	1969	1969	Let It Bleed	Jagger/Richards	Jagger
"Living in a Ghost Town"	2019	2020	Non-album single	Jagger/Richards	Jagger
"Living in the Heart of Love"	1972-1981	2021	Tattoo You (reissue)	Jagger/Richards	Jagger
"Long Long While"	1966	1966	No Stone Unturned (UK); More Hot Rocks (Big Hits & Fazed Cookies) (US)	Jagger/Richards	Jagger
"Look What the Cat Dragged In"	2004	2005	A Bigger Bang	Jagger/Richards	Jagger
"Look What You've Done"	1964	1965	Stone Age (UK); December's Children (And Everybody's) (US)	Muddy Waters	Jagger
"Looking Tired"	1964	–	bootleg recording/outtake	Jagger/Richards	Jagger
"Losing My Touch"	2002	2002	Forty Licks	Jagger/Richards	Richards
"Love in Vain"	1969	1969	Let It Bleed	Robert Johnson	Jagger
"Love Is Strong"	1993	1994	Voodoo Lounge	Jagger/Richards	Jagger
"Love Train" (live)	2003	2003	Four Flicks	Kenny Gamble/Leon Huff	Jagger
"Loving Cup"	1971	1972	Exile on Main St.	Jagger/Richards	Jagger
"Loving You Is Sweeter Than Ever"	1985	–	bootleg recording/outtake	Ivy Jo Hunter/Stevie Wonder	Jagger
"Low Down"	1997	1997	Bridges to Babylon	Jagger/Richards	Jagger
"Luxury"	1974	1974	It's Only Rock 'n Roll	Jagger/Richards	Jagger
"Mannish Boy" (live)	1977	1977	Love You Live	Muddy Waters/Mel London/Bo Diddley	Jagger
"Mean Disposition"	1994	1994	Voodoo Lounge	Jagger/Richards	Jagger
"Melody"	1975	1976	Black and Blue	Jagger/Richards	Jagger
"Memo from Turner"	1968	1975	Metamorphosis	Jagger/Richards	Jagger (Jagger solo recording)
"Memory Motel"	1975	1976	Black and Blue	Jagger/Richards	Jagger, Richards
"Memphis, Tennessee" (live)	1963	2017	On Air	Chuck Berry	Jagger
"Mercy, Mercy"	1964	1965	Out of Our Heads	Don Covay/Ronnie Miller	Jagger
"Mess It Up"	2019, 2020, 2022–2023	2023	Hackney Diamonds	Jagger/Richards	Jagger
"Midnight Rambler"	1969	1969	Let It Bleed	Jagger/Richards	Jagger
"Might as Well Get Juiced"	1997	1997	Bridges to Babylon	Jagger/Richards	Jagger
"Miss Amanda Jones"	1966	1967	Between the Buttons	Jagger/Richards	Jagger
"Miss You"	1977	1978	Some Girls	Jagger/Richards	Jagger
"Mixed Emotions"	1989	1989	Steel Wheels	Jagger/Richards	Jagger
"Mona (I Need You Baby)"	1964	1964	The Rolling Stones (UK); The Rolling Stones, Now! (US)	Bo Diddley	Jagger
"Money"	1963	1964	The Rolling Stones (EP) (UK); More Hot Rocks (Big Hits & Fazed Cookies) (US)	Janie Bradford/Berry Gordy	Jagger
"Monkey Man"	1969	1969	Let It Bleed	Jagger/Richards	Jagger
"Moon is Up"	1994	1994	Voodoo Lounge	Jagger/Richards	Jagger
"Moonlight Mile"	1970	1971	Sticky Fingers	Jagger/Richards	Jagger
"Mother's Little Helper"	1965	1966	Aftermath (UK) Flowers (US)	Jagger/Richards	Jagger
"Mr Charm"	2019, 2021, 2022–2023, 2025-2026	2026	Foreign Tongues	Jagger/Richards	Jagger
"Mr. Pitiful" (live)	2005	2012	Light the Fuse	Steve Cropper/Otis Redding	Jagger
"My Girl"	1965	1967	Stone Age (UK) Flowers (US)	Smokey Robinson/Ronald White	Jagger
"My Obsession"	1966	1967	Between the Buttons	Jagger/Richards	Jagger
"The Nearness of You" (live)	2002	2004	Live Licks	Hoagy Carmichael/Ned Washington	Richards
"Neighbours"	1980	1981	Tattoo You	Jagger/Richards	Jagger
"Never Wanna Lose You"	2019, 2021, 2022–2023, 2025-2026	2026	Foreign Tongues	Jagger/Richards/Matt Clifford	Jagger
"New Faces"	1994	1994	Voodoo Lounge	Jagger/Richards	Jagger
"No Expectations"	1968	1968	Beggars Banquet	Jagger/Richards	Jagger
"No Spare Parts"	1977	2011	Some Girls (reissue)	Jagger/Richards	Jagger
"No Use in Crying"	1980	1981	Tattoo You	Jagger/Richards/Wood	Jagger
"Not Fade Away"	1964	1964	Non-album single (UK); England's Newest Hit Makers (US)	Buddy Holly/Norman Petty	Jagger
"Nothing from Nothing" (live)	1976	2025	Black and Blue (Super Deluxe)	Billy Preston/Bruce Fisher	Billy Preston
"Now I've Got a Witness (Like Uncle Phil and Uncle Gene)"	1964	1964	The Rolling Stones (UK); England's Newest Hit Makers (US)	Nanker Phelge	Jagger
"Off the Hook"	1964	1965	The Rolling Stones No. 2 (UK); The Rolling Stones, Now! (US)	Jagger/Richards	Jagger
"Oh, Baby (We Got a Good Thing Going)"	1964	1965	Out of Our Heads (UK); The Rolling Stones, Now! (US)	Barbara Lynn Ozen	Jagger
"Oh No, Not You Again"	2005	2005	A Bigger Bang	Jagger/Richards	Jagger
"On with the Show"	1967	1967	Their Satanic Majesties Request	Jagger/Richards	Jagger
"One Hit (To the Body)"	1985	1986	Dirty Work	Jagger/Richards/Wood	Jagger
"One More Shot"	2012	2012	GRRR!	Jagger/Richards/Jordan	Jagger
"One More Try"	1965	1965	Stone Age (UK); Out of Our Heads (US)	Jagger/Richards	Jagger
"Outa-Space" (live)	1976	2025	Black and Blue (Super Deluxe)	Billy Preston/Joe Greene	Preston
"Out of Control"	1997	1997	Bridges to Babylon	Jagger/Richards	Jagger
"Out of Tears"	1993	1994	Voodoo Lounge	Jagger/Richards	Jagger
"Out of Time"	1966	1966	Aftermath (UK); Flowers (US)	Jagger/Richards	Jagger
"Pain in My Heart"	1964	1965	The Rolling Stones No. 2 (UK); The Rolling Stones, Now! (US)	Allen Toussaint (under the pseudonym Naomi Neville)	Jagger
"Paint It Black"	1966	1966	Big Hits (High Tide and Green Grass) (UK); Aftermath (US)	Jagger/Richards	Jagger
"Parachute Woman"	1968	1968	Beggars Banquet	Jagger/Richards	Jagger
"Pass the Wine (Sophia Loren)"	1972	2010	Exile on Main St. (reissue)	Jagger/Richards	Jagger
"Petrol Blues"	1977	2011	Some Girls (reissue)	Jagger/Richards	Jagger
"Play with Fire"	1965	1965	Hot Rocks 1964–1971 (UK); Out of Our Heads (US)	Jagger/Richards	Jagger
"Please Go Home"	1966	1967	Between the Buttons (UK); Flowers (US)	Jagger/Richards	Jagger
"Plundered My Soul"	1971, 2009	2010	Exile on Main St. (reissue)	Jagger/Richards	Jagger
"Poison Ivy"	1963	1964	The Rolling Stones (EP) (UK); More Hot Rocks (Big Hits & Fazed Cookies) (US)	Jerry Leiber/Mike Stoller	Jagger
"Potted Shrimp"	1970	–	Bootleg recording/outtake		none (instrumental)
"Pretty Beat Up"	1983	1983	Undercover	Jagger/Richards/Wood	Jagger
"Prodigal Son"	1968	1968	Beggars Banquet	Rev. Robert Wilkins	Jagger
"Rain Fall Down"	2004	2005	A Bigger Bang	Jagger/Richards	Jagger
"Respectable"	1977	1978	Some Girls	Jagger/Richards	Jagger
"Ride 'Em on Down"	2015	2016	Blue & Lonesome	Eddie Taylor	Jagger
"Ride On, Baby"	1965	1967	No Stone Unturned (UK); Flowers (US)	Jagger/Richards	Jagger
"Ringing Hollow"	2019, 2021, 2022–2023, 2025-2026	2026	Foreign Tongues	Jagger/Richards	Jagger
"Rip This Joint"	1971	1972	Exile on Main St.	Jagger/Richards	Jagger
"Road Runner"	1963	2012	GRRR! (Super Deluxe)	Bo Diddley	Jagger
"Rock and a Hard Place"	1989	1989	Steel Wheels	Jagger/Richards	Jagger
"Rock Me Baby" (live)	2002	2004	Live Licks	B.B. King/Joe Bihari	Jagger
"Rocks Off"	1971	1972	Exile on Main St.	Jagger/Richards	Jagger
"Roll Over Beethoven" (live)	1963	2017	On Air	Chuck Berry	Jagger
"Rolling Stone Blues"	2019, 2020, 2022–2023	2023	Hackney Diamonds	Muddy Waters	Jagger
"Rotterdam Jam"	1975–1976	2025	Black and Blue (Super Deluxe)	Jagger/Richards/Wyman/Watts/Wood	none (instrumental)
"Rough and Twisted"	2019, 2021, 2022–2023, 2025-2026	2026	Foreign Tongues	Jagger/Richards	Jagger
"Rough Justice"	2004	2005	A Bigger Bang	Jagger/Richards	Jagger
"Route 66"	1964	1964	The Rolling Stones (UK); England's Newest Hit Makers (US)	Bobby Troup	Jagger
"Ruby Tuesday"	1966	1967	Non-album single (UK); Between the Buttons (US)	Jagger/Richards	Jagger
"Sad Day"	1965	1966	No Stone Unturned (UK); B-side of "19th Nervous Breakdown (US)	Jagger/Richards	Jagger
"Sad Sad Sad"	1989	1989	Steel Wheels	Jagger/Richards	Jagger
"Saint of Me"	1997	1997	Bridges to Babylon	Jagger/Richards	Jagger
"Salt of the Earth"	1968	1968	Beggars Banquet	Jagger/Richards	Jagger, Richards
"Scarlet"	1974	2020	Goats Head Soup (reissue)	Jagger/Richards	Jagger
"Schoolboy Blues (Cocksucker Blues)"	1970	–	–	Jagger	Jagger
"Send It to Me"	1979	1980	Emotional Rescue	Jagger/Richards	Jagger
"Sex Drive"	1991	1991	Flashpoint	Jagger/Richards	Jagger
"Shake Your Hips"	1971	1972	Exile on Main St.	Slim Harpo	Jagger
"Shame, Shame, Shame"	1972–1981	2021	Tattoo You (reissue)	Jimmy Reed	Jagger
"Shame, Shame, Shame"	1976	2025	Black and Blue (Super Deluxe)	Sylvia Robinson	Jagger
"Shattered"	1977	1978	Some Girls	Jagger/Richards	Jagger
"She Said Yeah"	1965	1965	Out of Our Heads (UK); December's Children (And Everybody's) (US)	Sonny Bono/Roddy Jackson	Jagger
"She Saw Me Coming"	2004	2005	A Bigger Bang	Jagger/Richards	Jagger
"She Smiled Sweetly"	1966	1967	Between the Buttons	Jagger/Richards	Jagger
"She Was Hot"	1982	1983	Undercover	Jagger/Richards	Jagger
"She's a Rainbow"	1967	1967	Their Satanic Majesties Request	Jagger/Richards	Jagger
"She's So Cold"	1979	1980	Emotional Rescue	Jagger/Richards	Jagger
"Shine a Light"	1970	1972	Exile on Main St.	Jagger/Richards	Jagger
"Short and Curlies"	1974	1974	It's Only Rock 'n Roll	Jagger/Richards	Jagger
"Silver Train"	1973	1973	Goats Head Soup	Jagger/Richards	Jagger
"Sing This All Together"	1967	1967	Their Satanic Majesties Request	Jagger/Richards	Jagger
"The Singer Not the Song"	1965	1965	B-side of "Get Off of My Cloud" (UK); December's Children (And Everybody's) (US)	Jagger/Richards	Jagger
"Sister Morphine"	1969	1971	Sticky Fingers	Jagger/Richards/Marianne Faithfull	Jagger
"Sittin' on a Fence"	1965	1967	Through the Past, Darkly (Big Hits Vol. 2) (UK); Flowers (US)	Jagger/Richards	Jagger
"Slave"	1981	1981	Tattoo You	Jagger/Richards	Jagger
"Sleep Tonight"	1985	1986	Dirty Work	Jagger/Richards	Jagger
"Slipping Away"	1989	1989	Steel Wheels	Jagger/Richards	Richards
"She Never Listens to Me"	1985	–	bootleg recording/outtake	Jagger/Richards	Richards
"Side Effects"	2019, 2021, 2022–2023, 2025-2026	2026	Foreign Tongues	Jagger/Richards/Andrew Watt	Jagger
"So Divine (Aladdin Story)"	1971	2010	Exile on Main St. (reissue)	Jagger/Richards	Jagger
"So Young"	1978	1994	The Singles 1971–2006; Some Girls (reissue)	Jagger/Richards	Jagger
"Some Girls"	1977	1978	Some Girls	Jagger/Richards	Jagger
"Some of Us"	2019, 2021, 2022–2023, 2025-2026	2026	Foreign Tongues	Jagger/Richards	Richards
"Some Things Just Stick in Your Mind"	1964	1975	Metamorphosis	Jagger/Richards	Jagger
"Something Happened to Me Yesterday"	1966	1967	Between the Buttons	Jagger/Richards	Jagger, Richards
"Soul Survivor"	1971	1972	Exile on Main St.	Jagger/Richards	Jagger
"Sparks Will Fly"	1993	1994	Voodoo Lounge	Jagger/Richards	Jagger
"The Spider and the Fly"	1965	1965	B-side of "(I Can't Get No) Satisfaction" (UK); Out of Our Heads (US)	Jagger/Richards	Jagger
"Star Star (Starfucker)"	1972	1973	Goats Head Soup	Jagger/Richards	Jagger
"Start Me Up"	1979	1981	Tattoo You	Jagger/Richards	Jagger
"Stealing My Heart"	2002	2002	Forty Licks	Jagger/Richards	Jagger
"Stewed and Keefed (Brian's Blues)"	1964	–	bootleg recording/outtake	Nanker Phelge/Stewart	Jagger
"Still a Fool"	1968	–	bootleg recording/outtake	Muddy Waters	Jagger
"Stoned"	1963	1963	B-side of "I Wanna Be Your Man" (UK); Singles Collection: The London Years (US)	Nanker Phelge	none (instrumental)
"Stop Breaking Down"	1971	1972	Exile on Main St.	Robert Johnson	Jagger
"The Storm"	1993	1994	The Singles 1971–2006	Jagger/Richards	Jagger
"Stray Cat Blues"	1968	1968	Beggars Banquet	Jagger/Richards	Jagger
"Street Fighting Man"	1968	1968	Beggars Banquet	Jagger/Richards	Jagger
"Streets of Love"	2004	2005	A Bigger Bang	Jagger/Richards	Jagger
"Strictly Memphis"	1985	–	bootleg recording/outtake	Jagger/Richards	Jagger
"Stuck Out All Alone"	1968	–	bootleg recording/outtake	Jagger/Richards	Jagger
"Stupid Girl"	1965	1966	Aftermath	Jagger/Richards	Jagger
"Suck on the Jugular"	1993	1994	Voodoo Lounge	Jagger/Richards	Jagger
"Summer Romance"	1979	1980	Emotional Rescue	Jagger/Richards	Jagger
"Summertime Blues"	1985	–	bootleg recording/outtake	Eddie Cochran/Jerry Capehart	Jagger
"Sure the One You Need"	1975	–	bootleg recording/outtake	Jagger/Richards	Richards, Wood
"Surprise, Surprise"	1964	1965	The Lord's Taverners Charity Album (UK); The Rolling Stones, Now! (US)	Jagger/Richards	Jagger
"Susie Q"	1964	1964	The Rolling Stones No. 2 (UK); 12 X 5 (US)	Dale Hawkins/Stan Lewis/Eleanore Broadwater	Jagger
"Sway"	1970	1971	Sticky Fingers	Jagger/Richards	Jagger
"Sweet Black Angel"	1971	1972	Exile on Main St.	Jagger/Richards	Jagger
"Sweet Little Sixteen"	1978	–	bootleg recording/outtake	Chuck Berry	Jagger
"Sweet Neo Con"	2004	2005	A Bigger Bang	Jagger/Richards	Jagger
"Sweet Sounds of Heaven"	2019, 2020, 2022–2023	2023	Hackney Diamonds	Jagger/Richards	Jagger, Lady Gaga
"Sweet Virginia"	1971	1972	Exile on Main St.	Jagger/Richards	Jagger
"Sweethearts Together"	1993	1994	Voodoo Lounge	Jagger/Richards	Jagger
"Sympathy for the Devil"	1968	1968	Beggars Banquet	Jagger/Richards	Jagger
"Take It or Leave It"	1965	1966	Aftermath (UK); Flowers (US)	Jagger/Richards	Jagger
"Talkin' About You"	1965	1965	Out of Our Heads (UK); December's Children (And Everybody's) (US)	Chuck Berry	Jagger
"Tallahassee Lassie"	1978	2011	Some Girls (reissue)	Bob Crewe/Frank Slay/Freddy Cannon	Jagger
"Tell Me"	1964	1964	The Rolling Stones (UK); England's Newest Hit Makers (US)	Jagger/Richards	Jagger
"Tell Me Straight"	2019, 2020, 2022–2023	2023	Hackney Diamonds	Jagger/Richards	Richards
"Terrifying"	1989	1989	Steel Wheels	Jagger/Richards	Jagger
"That's How Strong My Love Is"	1965	1965	Out of Our Heads	Roosevelt Jamison	Jagger
"Thief in the Night"	1997	1997	Bridges to Babylon	Jagger/Richards/Pierre de Beauport	Richards
"Think"	1965	1966	Aftermath	Jagger/Richards	Jagger
"This Place Is Empty"	2004	2005	A Bigger Bang	Jagger/Richards	Richards
"Through the Lonely Nights"	1973	1974	Rarities 1971–2003	Jagger/Richards	Jagger
"Thru and Thru"	1993	1994	Voodoo Lounge	Jagger/Richards	Richards
"Tie You Up (The Pain of Love)"	1982	1983	Undercover	Jagger/Richards	Jagger
"Till the Next Goodbye"	1973	1974	It's Only Rock 'n Roll	Jagger/Richards	Jagger
"Time Is on My Side"	1964	1964	The Rolling Stones No. 2 (UK); 12 X 5 (US)	Norman Meade/Jimmy Norman	Jagger
"Time Waits for No One"	1973	1974	It's Only Rock 'n Roll	Jagger/Richards	Jagger
"Title 5"	1967	2010	Exile on Main St. (reissue)	Jagger/Richards	none (instrumental)
"Too Much Blood"	1982	1983	Undercover	Jagger/Richards	Jagger
"Too Rude"	1985	1986	Dirty Work	Lindon Roberts	Richards
"Too Tight"	1997	1997	Bridges to Babylon	Jagger/Richards	Jagger
"Too Tough"	1982	1983	Undercover	Jagger/Richards	Jagger
"Tops"	1979	1981	Tattoo You	Jagger/Richards	Jagger
"Torn and Frayed"	1971	1972	Exile on Main St.	Jagger/Richards	Jagger, Richards
"Tried to Talk Her Into It"	1982	–	bootleg recording/outtake	Jagger/Richards	Jagger
"Troubles a' Comin"	1972–1981	2021	Tattoo You (reissue)	Eugene Record	Jagger
"Try a Little Harder"	1964	1975	Metamorphosis	Jagger/Richards	Jagger
"Tumbling Dice"	1971	1972	Exile on Main St.	Jagger/Richards	Jagger
"Turd on the Run"	1971	1972	Exile on Main St.	Jagger/Richards	Jagger
"Twenty Flight Rock" (live)	1981	1982	Still Life	Eddie Cochran/Nelda Fairchild	Jagger
"The Under Assistant West Coast Promotion Man"	1965	1965	Out of Our Heads	Nanker Phelge	Jagger
"Under My Thumb"	1966	1966	Aftermath	Jagger/Richards	Jagger
"Under the Boardwalk"	1964	1964	The Rolling Stones No. 2 (UK); 12 X 5 (US)	Kenny Young/Arthur Resnick	Jagger
"Undercover of the Night"	1982	1983	Undercover	Jagger/Richards	Jagger
"Uptight (Everything's Alright)"	1972	–	bootleg recording/outtake	Stevie Wonder/Sylvia Moy/Henry Cosby	Stevie Wonder, Jagger
"Ventilator Blues"	1971	1972	Exile on Main St.	Jagger/Richards/Taylor	Jagger
"Waiting on a Friend"	1972	1981	Tattoo You	Jagger/Richards	Jagger
"(Walkin' Thru The) Sleepy City"	1964	1975	Metamorphosis	Jagger/Richards	Jagger
"Walking the Dog"	1964	1964	The Rolling Stones (UK); England's Newest Hit Makers (US)	Rufus Thomas	Jagger
"Wanna Hold You"	1982	1983	Undercover	Jagger/Richards	Richards
"We Had It All"	1979	2011	Some Girls (reissue)	Troy Seals/Donnie Fritts	Richards
"We Love You"	1967	1967	Non-album single	Jagger/Richards	Jagger
"We're Wastin' Time"	1964	1975	Metamorphosis	Jagger/Richards	Jagger
"What a Shame"	1964	1965	The Rolling Stones No. 2 (UK); The Rolling Stones, Now! (US)	Jagger/Richards	Jagger
"What to Do"	1965	1966	Aftermath (UK); More Hot Rocks (Big Hits & Fazed Cookies) (US)	Jagger/Richards	Jagger
"When the Whip Comes Down"	1977	1978	Some Girls	Jagger/Richards	Jagger
"When You're Gone"	1977	2011	Some Girls (reissue)	Jagger/Richards/Wood	Jagger
"Where the Boys Go"	1979	1980	Emotional Rescue	Jagger/Richards	Jagger
"Who's Been Sleeping Here"	1966	1967	Between the Buttons	Jagger/Richards	Jagger
"Who's Driving Your Plane?"	1966	1966	No Stone Unturned (UK); Singles Collection: The London Years (US)	Jagger/Richards	Jagger
"Whole Wide World"	2019, 2020, 2022–2023	2023	Hackney Diamonds	Jagger/Richards	Jagger
"Who You Callin' Crazy"	2019, 2021, 2022–2023, 2025-2026	2026	Foreign Tongues, Loose Lips	Jagger/Richards	Jagger
"Wild Horses"	1969	1971	Sticky Fingers	Jagger/Richards	Jagger
"Winning Ugly"	1985	1986	Dirty Work	Jagger/Richards	Jagger
"Winter"	1972	1973	Goats Head Soup	Jagger/Richards	Jagger
"Wish I'd Never Met You"	1989	1990	Rarities 1971–2003	Jagger/Richards	Jagger
"Worried About You"	1974	1981	Tattoo You	Jagger/Richards	Jagger
"The Worst"	1993	1994	Voodoo Lounge	Jagger/Richards	Richards
"Yesterday's Papers"	1966	1967	Between the Buttons	Jagger/Richards	Jagger
"You Better Move On"	1963	1964	The Rolling Stones (EP) (UK); December's Children (And Everybody's) (US)	Arthur Alexander	Jagger
"You Can Make It If You Try"	1964	1964	The Rolling Stones (UK); England's Newest Hit Makers (US)	Ted Jarrett	Jagger
"You Can't Always Get What You Want"	1968	1969	Let It Bleed	Jagger/Richards	Jagger
"You Can't Catch Me"	1964	1965	The Rolling Stones No. 2 (UK); The Rolling Stones, Now! (US)	Chuck Berry	Jagger
"You Don't Have to Mean It"	1997	1997	Bridges to Babylon	Jagger/Richards	Richards
"You Got Me Rocking"	1993	1994	Voodoo Lounge	Jagger/Richards	Jagger
"You Got the Silver"	1969	1969	Let It Bleed	Jagger/Richards	Richards
"You Gotta Move"	1969	1971	Sticky Fingers	Fred McDowell/Gary Davis	Jagger
"You Know I'm No Good"	2019, 2021, 2022–2023, 2025-2026	2026	Foreign Tongues	Amy Winehouse	Jagger
"You Should Have Seen Her Ass"	1972	1972	bootleg recording/outtake	Jagger/Richards	Jagger
"You Win Again"	1977	2011	Some Girls (reissue)	Hank Williams	Jagger
"Zydeco Sont Pas Salés"	2025	2025	A Tribute to the King of Zydeco	Clifton Chenier	Jagger

== See also ==
- Jagger–Richards
- The Rolling Stones discography
