= Stone Age (Rolling Stones album) =

Compilation album by the Rolling Stones
- Released: 6 March 1971
- Recorded: 1963–1966
- Genre: Rock
- Length: 34:13
- Label: Decca
- Producer: Andrew Loog Oldham

The Rolling Stones chronology
Get Yer Ya-Ya's Out! (1970)	Stone Age (1971)	Sticky Fingers (1971)

Professional ratings
Review scores
Source	Rating
AllMusic	3.5/5 stars

Stone Age is a compilation album of songs by the English rock band the Rolling Stones, released in 1971 by Decca Records. Featuring songs that had never appeared on a UK album, it was the first compilation issued by Decca after the Stones had left the label and set up their own record label, and was adamantly opposed by the band. It reached No. 4 on the UK charts.

== Background ==
The 12 songs on Stone Age, all dating from the mid-1960s, were chosen because they had never before appeared on a UK studio album, having been originally released only on singles or on US studio albums up to that point. Four songs made their overall UK debut here: "Blue Turns to Grey", "One More Try", "My Girl" and "Look What You've Done".

This is the first compilation album released by Decca after the Rolling Stones left the label, stemming from dissatisfaction with the amount of royalties they were receiving. The band and label had been feuding since 1968, after Decca rejected the band's original cover for their album Beggars Banquet, which featured an image of a restroom covered in graffiti. This culminated in 1970 when the band recorded the song "Schoolboy Blues", which featured lurid lyrics intended to thwart Decca from releasing it. Stone Age was released by Decca just before the band's new studio album, Sticky Fingers, was to be released by their own new label. Additionally, Decca released Stone Age with a graffiti cover, alluding to the feud over Beggars Banquet.

The band published an ad in several different UK newspapers as a disclaimer for the album:

Beware! Message from the Rolling Stones Re: Stone Age. We didn't know this record was going to be released. It is, in our opinion, below the standard we try to keep up, both in choice of content and cover design.

Decca continued to issue further Rolling Stones releases: Gimme Shelter (1971), Milestones (1972), Rock 'n' Rolling Stones (1972), No Stone Unturned (1973), Rolled Gold (1975), Solid Rock (1980) and Slow Rollers (1981). With the exception of a special version of Rolled Gold in 2007, none of these albums were released on compact disc.

== Track listing ==
All tracks composed by Mick Jagger and Keith Richards, except where noted.

Side one
No.	Title	Writer(s)	Original release(s)	Length
1.	"Look What You've Done"	McKinley Morganfield	UK – no previous release US – December's Children (And Everybody's) (1965)	2:18
2.	"It's All Over Now"	Bobby Womack, Shirley Womack	UK – Non album single (1964); US – 12 X 5 (1964)	3:27
3.	"Confessin' the Blues"	Walter Brown, Jay McShann	UK – Five by Five (EP) (1964); US – 12 X 5 (1964)	2:49
4.	"One More Try"		UK – no previous release US – Out of Our Heads (1965)	1:59
5.	"As Tears Go By"	Jagger, Richards, Andrew Loog Oldham	UK – B-side of "19th Nervous Breakdown" (1966); US – December's Children (And Everybody's) (1965)	2:45
6.	"The Spider and the Fly"	Nanker Phelge	UK – B-side of "(I Can't Get No) Satisfaction" (1965); US – Out of Our Heads (1965)	3:41

Side two
No.	Title	Writer(s)	Original release(s)	Length
1.	"My Girl"	Smokey Robinson, Ronald White	UK – no previous release US – Flowers (1967)	2:39
2.	"Paint It Black"		UK – Non album single (1966); US – Aftermath (1966)	3:24
3.	"If You Need Me"	Wilson Pickett, Robert Bateman, Sonny Sanders	UK – Five by Five (EP) (1964); US – 12 X 5 (1964)	2:02
4.	"The Last Time"		UK – Non album single (1965); US – Out of Our Heads (1965)	3:41
5.	"Blue Turns to Grey"		UK – no previous release US – December's Children (And Everybody's) (1965)	2:30
6.	"Around and Around"	Chuck Berry	UK – Five by Five (EP) (1964); US – 12 X 5 (1964)	3:03

== Charts ==
Chart (1971)	Peak position
Canada Top Albums/CDs (RPM)	51
Dutch Albums (Album Top 100)	19
Finland (The Official Finnish Charts)	18
German Albums (Offizielle Top 100)	30
Italian Albums (Musica e Dischi)	20
Norwegian Albums (VG-lista)	15
UK Albums (Official Charts)	4
