= Big Hits (High Tide and Green Grass) =

1966 compilation album by the Rolling Stones

- Original UK edition

Greatest hits album by the Rolling Stones
- Released: 28 March 1966 (US); 4 November 1966 (UK)
- Recorded: London, Chicago, and Hollywood, 1964–1965
- Genre: Rock
- Length: 36:29
- Label: Decca
- Producer: Andrew Loog Oldham

The Rolling Stones UK chronology
Aftermath (1966)	Big Hits (High Tide and Green Grass) (1966)	Between the Buttons (1967)

The Rolling Stones US chronology
December's Children (And Everybody's) (1965)	Big Hits (High Tide and Green Grass) (1966)	Aftermath (1966)

US edition
- Released 28 March 1966 by London

Big Hits (High Tide and Green Grass) is the first compilation album by the Rolling Stones. With different cover art and track listings, it was released on 28 March 1966, on London Records in the US and on 4 November 1966, by Decca Records in the UK.

The American edition focused on songs from 1964 and 1965 with two new tunes: the recent "19th Nervous Breakdown" and the re-recorded "Time Is on My Side" with the guitar intro. The British version covered a longer period, from the group's first single A-side in 1963, "Come On", to several songs from 1966, including the recent hit "Have You Seen Your Mother, Baby, Standing in the Shadow?"

The album reached number three on the US Billboard 200 and number four on the UK Albums Chart. It remained on the chart 99 weeks in the US, where the RIAA certified the album double platinum, signifying over two million copies sold.

== Release ==
The songs chosen for the American version of Big Hits were roughly split between originals written by Mick Jagger and Keith Richards and those by American R&B and rock 'n' roll musicians, with most of the songs taken from the first five US Stones albums released by London Records. The album cover photo for the US edition was taken at Franklin Canyon Park in the mountains above Beverly Hills by Guy Webster.

The UK Big Hits (High Tide and Green Grass) includes tracks released after the American edition appeared. The Rolling Stones' debut 1963 single, a cover of Chuck Berry's "Come On", was included, but the more successful follow-up, "I Wanna Be Your Man" – composed by rivals (although, in reality, friends) Lennon–McCartney – was left off the album. However, an early slick-proof of the album, displayed on Exhibitionism in London in 2016, showed the track as slated for inclusion, but it was ultimately replaced by "Time Is on My Side" by Jerry Ragovoy (as 'Norman Meade'). The fisheye lens-view photo used for the UK front cover was taken in New York City by Jerry Schatzberg, with the back cover featuring the Webster photo from the US cover.

Big Hits (High Tide and Green Grass) reached number four in the UK charts. The British version was again made available to the public as part of a limited edition vinyl box set, titled "The Rolling Stones 1964–1969", in November 2010. It was also re-released digitally at the same time. The vinyl version of the album includes a booklet pasted into the gatefold with color photos of the Rolling Stones in concert and in the studio.

Once more, the UK version was released on Record Store Day in 2019 on Green Vinyl, to go along with the release of its second volume, Through the Past, Darkly, which was released on orange vinyl for both Record Store Day and its 50th anniversary, as stated on the Record Store Day sticker affixed on the front of the vinyl cover.

== Critical reception ==
Professional ratings
Review scores
Source	Rating
AllMusic	4.5/5 stars
The Encyclopedia of Popular Music	4/5 stars
The Rolling Stone Album Guide	5/5 stars
Tom Hull	A+

In a retrospective review for AllMusic, Bruce Eder said the US edition of Big Hits is "still one of the most potent collections of singles that one can find ... Appearing as it did in the late winter of 1966, this collection completely missed the group's drift into psychedelia, and it has since been supplanted by Hot Rocks and More Hot Rocks, but Big Hits is still the most concentrated dose of the early Stones at their most accessible that is to be had, short of simply playing their first five U.S. albums." Reviewing the 2002 ABKCO reissue, Kent H. Benjamin from The Austin Chronicle regarded it as essential in order to "get most of the Stones' original singles in true stereo".

Music biographer and journalist Johnny Rogan said that in the UK, Big Hits and the Beatles' December 1966 compilation A Collection of Beatles Oldies were significant because "Britain's two premier groups" had issued "greatest hits collections in the home market for the first time in their careers". Both albums, in his opinion, "represented a coming of age, reminding listeners and the artistes themselves that they were already the equivalent of heritage acts, whose remarkable run of hits qualified them for a rare privilege, unlikely to be repeated for many years, if ever".

== Track listing ==
=== UK edition ===
All tracks are written by Mick Jagger and Keith Richards, except where noted.

Side one
No.	Title	Writer(s)	Original UK release (Month/year)	Length
1.	"Have You Seen Your Mother, Baby, Standing in the Shadow?"		Single (9/66)	2:34
2.	"Paint It Black"		Single (5/66)	3:20
3.	"It's All Over Now"	Bobby Womack; Shirley Jean Womack	Single (6/64)	3:27
4.	"The Last Time"		Single (2/65)	3:40
5.	"Heart of Stone"		Out of Our Heads (9/65)	2:46
6.	"Not Fade Away"	Buddy Holly; Norman Petty	Single (2/64)	1:48
7.	"Come On"	Chuck Berry	Single (6/63)	1:49

Side two
No.	Title	Writer(s)	Original UK release (Month/year)	Length
1.	"(I Can't Get No) Satisfaction"		Single (8/65)	3:43
2.	"Get Off of My Cloud"		Single (10/65)	2:55
3.	"As Tears Go By"	Mick Jagger; Keith Richards; Andrew Loog Oldham	Single (2/66)	2:45
4.	"19th Nervous Breakdown"		Single (2/66)	3:57
5.	"Lady Jane"		Aftermath (4/66)	2:31
6.	"Time Is on My Side"	Norman Meade	The Rolling Stones No. 2 (1/65)	2:53
7.	"Little Red Rooster"	Willie Dixon	Single (11/64)	3:05

=== US edition ===
Side one
No.	Title	Writer(s)	US album debut and release (Month/year)	Length
1.	"(I Can't Get No) Satisfaction"		Out of Our Heads (7/1965)	3:43
2.	"The Last Time"		Out of Our Heads	3:40
3.	"As Tears Go By"	Mick Jagger; Keith Richards; Andrew Loog Oldham	December's Children (And Everybody's) (12/65)	2:45
4.	"Time Is on My Side" (guitar intro version)	Norman Meade	Big Hits... (3/66)	2:58
5.	"It's All Over Now"	Bobby Womack; Shirley Jean Womack	12 X 5 (10/64)	3:26
6.	"Tell Me (You're Coming Back)"		England's Newest Hit Makers (5/64)	3:46

Side two
No.	Title	Writer(s)	Original US release (Month/year)	Length
1.	"19th Nervous Breakdown"		London single 9823 (2/66)	3:56
2.	"Heart of Stone"		The Rolling Stones, Now! (2/65)	2:50
3.	"Get Off of My Cloud"		December's Children (And Everybody's)	2:55
4.	"Not Fade Away"	Buddy Holly; Norman Petty	England's Newest Hit Makers	1:48
5.	"Good Times, Bad Times"		12 X 5	2:31
6.	"Play with Fire"	Nanker Phelge	Out of Our Heads	2:13

== Personnel ==
The Rolling Stones

- Mick Jagger – lead vocals, harmonica, percussion
- Brian Jones – rhythm and lead guitar, slide guitar, sitar, harmonica, dulcimer, backing vocals
- Keith Richards – lead and rhythm guitar, backing vocals
- Charlie Watts – drums, percussion
- Bill Wyman – bass guitar, organ, backing vocals

Additional personnel

- Andrew Loog Oldham – production, cover design
- Gerard Mankowitz – photography
- Jack Nitzsche – piano, harpsichord, percussion
- Phil Spector – percussion
- Ian Stewart – piano, organ
- Guy Webster – photography

== Charts ==
Chart (1966–68)	Peak position
Finland (The Official Finnish Charts)	8
Norwegian Albums (VG-lista)	5
UK Albums (Official Charts)	4
US Billboard 200	3

Chart (2005)	Peak position
Swedish Albums (Sverigetopplistan)	49

== Certifications ==
Region	Certification	Certified units/sales
Canada (Music Canada)	Gold	50,000^{^}
United Kingdom (BPI) 2006 release	Silver	60,000^{^}
United States (RIAA)	2× Platinum	2,000,000^{^}
^{^} Shipments figures based on certification alone.
