= Singles 1965–1967 =

Box set by The Rolling Stones
- Released: 12 July 2004
- Recorded: May 1965 – October 1967
- Genre: Rock
- Length: 82:53
- Label: Decca/ABKCO
- Producers: Andrew Loog Oldham, The Rolling Stones

The Rolling Stones chronology
| Singles 1963–1965 (2004) | Singles 1965–1967 (2004) | Live Licks (2004) |

Professional ratings
Review scores
| Source | Rating |
|---|---|
| Allmusic | 4/5 stars |
| Encyclopedia of Popular Music | 5/5 stars |
| Tom Hull | A− |

Singles 1965–1967 is a box set compilation of singles by the Rolling Stones spanning the years 1965–1967. The second in a series of repackages by ABKCO Records, who license the Rolling Stones' 1963–1970 recorded works, Singles 1965–1967 is the second of three successive volumes to commemorate their non-LP releases during this era.

While the set features faithful replicas of all individual single covers (even the CDs are reproduced in black), the set—and the two others in the series—came under some criticism as to their necessity, especially as 1989's Singles Collection: The London Years already covered this material to "Satisfaction".

Journalist Nigel Williamson provides a liner notes essay.

== Track listing ==
All songs by Mick Jagger and Keith Richards, except where noted.

Disc one

1. "(I Can't Get No) Satisfaction" – 3:43
2. "The Under Assistant West Coast Promotion Man" (Nanker Phelge) – 3:08
3. "The Spider and the Fly" – 3:38

Disc two

1. "Get Off of My Cloud" – 2:54
2. "I'm Free" – 2:24
3. "The Singer Not the Song" – 2:22

Disc three

1. "As Tears Go By" (Jagger/Richards/Andrew Loog Oldham) – 2:45
2. "Gotta Get Away" – 2:07

Disc four

1. "19th Nervous Breakdown" – 3:57
2. "Sad Day" – 3:02

Disc five

1. "Paint It Black" – 3:44
2. "Stupid Girl" – 2:55
3. "Long, Long While" – 3:01

Disc six

1. "Mother's Little Helper" – 2:45
2. "Lady Jane" – 3:09

Disc seven

1. "Have You Seen Your Mother, Baby, Standing in the Shadow?" – 2:34
2. "Who's Driving Your Plane?" – 3:14

Disc eight

1. "Let's Spend the Night Together" – 3:26
2. "Ruby Tuesday" – 3:13

Disc nine

1. "We Love You" – 4:36
2. "Dandelion" – 3:48

Disc ten

1. "She's a Rainbow" – 4:12
2. "2000 Light Years from Home" – 4:44

Disc eleven

1. "In Another Land" (Bill Wyman) – 2:53
2. "The Lantern" – 4:26
