= Hot Rocks 1964–1971 =

Greatest hits album by the Rolling Stones
- Released: 20 December 1971
- Recorded: October 1964 – January 1971
- Genre: Rock
- Length: 84:56
- Label: London
- Producers: Andrew Loog Oldham, Jimmy Miller, the Rolling Stones, and Glyn Johns

The Rolling Stones chronology
Gimme Shelter (1971)	Hot Rocks 1964–1971 (1971)	Milestones (1972)

Hot Rocks 1964–1971 is a compilation album by the Rolling Stones released by London Records in December 1971. It became the Rolling Stones' best-selling release of their career and an enduring and popular retrospective. The album includes a mixture of hit singles, such as "Jumpin' Jack Flash", B-sides such as "Play with Fire", and album tracks such as "Under My Thumb" and "Gimme Shelter", the last of which has become one of the Rolling Stones' most popular and highly regarded songs. The album artwork depicts five nested silhouettes of the band members' profiles taken by rock photographer Ron Raffaelli in 1969. A photograph of the band at Swarkestone Hall Pavilion, taken by Michael Joseph in 1968, was printed on the back cover of the vinyl release.

The album is the best selling of the numerous Decca/ABKCO releases after the Rolling Stones lost control of their pre-1971 catalogue to their former manager Allen Klein. As with all of such releases, the Stones had no control over the collection or its release.

== Release and reception ==
Professional ratings
Review scores
Source	Rating
AllMusic	4.5/5 stars
Christgau's Record Guide	B−
Rolling Stone	5/5 stars
Select	4/5 medals
Tom Hull	A

Hot Rocks 1964–1971 peaked at No. 4 on the Billboard 200 album chart and, as of August 2026, the album has spent 443 weeks on the chart. The album was certified 12× platinum by the Recording Industry Association of America. The album was not released in the UK until 21 May 1990, to coincide with the Urban Jungle Tour, reaching No. 3 and, as of August 2023, it has spent 361 weeks on the UK Top 200.

Robert Christgau rated the album a B−, writing "If you don't like the Stones, this might serve as a sampler... Look, here's how it works. Except for Satanic Majesties, which isn't represented here, all of their '60s studio albums are musts."

In August 2002, Hot Rocks 1964–1971 was reissued in a new remastered CD and SACD digipak by ABKCO Records.

== Track listing ==
All songs by Mick Jagger and Keith Richards, except where noted.

Side one
No.	Title	Original release(s)	Length
1.	"Time Is on My Side" (guitar intro version) (Norman Meade)	UK – The Rolling Stones No. 2 (1965); US – Original organ intro version on 12 X 5 (1964)	3:00
2.	"Heart of Stone"	UK – Out of Our Heads (1965); US – A-side (1964) / The Rolling Stones, Now! (1965)	2:49
3.	"Play with Fire" (Nanker Phelge)	UK – B-side of "The Last Time" (1965); US – B-side of "The Last Time" (1965) / Out of Our Heads (1965)	2:13
4.	"(I Can't Get No) Satisfaction" (stereo version)	UK – A-side (1965); US – A-side (1965) / Out of Our Heads (1965)	3:43
5.	"As Tears Go By" (Mick Jagger/Keith Richards/Andrew Loog Oldham)	UK – B-side of "19th Nervous Breakdown" (1966); US – A-side (1965) / December's Children (And Everybody's) (1965)	2:44
6.	"Get Off of My Cloud"	UK – A-side (1965); US – A-side (1965) / December's Children (And Everybody's) (1965)	2:55

Side two
No.	Title	Original release(s)	Length
1.	"Mother's Little Helper"	UK – Aftermath (1966); US – A-side (1966)	2:44
2.	"19th Nervous Breakdown"	UK & US – A-side (1966)	3:56
3.	"Paint It Black"	UK – A-side (1966); US – A-side (1966) / Aftermath (1966)	3:22
4.	"Under My Thumb"	UK & US – Aftermath (1966)	3:42
5.	"Ruby Tuesday"	UK – A-side (1967); US – A-side (1967) / Between the Buttons (1967)	3:16
6.	"Let's Spend the Night Together"	UK – A-side (1967); US – A-side (1967) / Between the Buttons (1967)	3:37

Side three
No.	Title	Original release(s)	Length
1.	"Jumpin' Jack Flash"	UK & US – A-side (1968)	3:41
2.	"Street Fighting Man"	UK – Beggars Banquet (1968); US – A-side (1968) / Beggars Banquet (1968)	3:14
3.	"Sympathy for the Devil"	UK & US – Beggars Banquet (1968)	6:18
4.	"Honky Tonk Women"	UK & US – A-side (1969)	3:00
5.	"Gimme Shelter"	UK & US – Let It Bleed (1969)	4:31

Side four
No.	Title	Original release(s)	Length
1.	"Midnight Rambler" (Live at Madison Square Garden, New York, New York, US, 28 November 1969)	UK & US – Get Yer Ya-Ya's Out! The Rolling Stones in Concert (1970); original studio version on Let It Bleed (1969)	9:05
2.	"You Can't Always Get What You Want"	UK & US – B-side of "Honky Tonk Women" (1969) [edit version] / Let It Bleed (1969)	7:30
3.	"Brown Sugar"	UK & US – A-side (1971) / Sticky Fingers (1971)	3:48
4.	"Wild Horses"	UK – Sticky Fingers (1971); US – A-side (1971) / Sticky Fingers (1971)	5:42

Notes

- All tracks on sides one and two were produced by Andrew Loog Oldham. All tracks on sides three and four were produced by Jimmy Miller, except "Midnight Rambler", which was produced by the Rolling Stones and Glyn Johns.

== Charts ==
=== Weekly charts ===
Chart (1971–1972)	Peak position
Australian Albums (Kent Music Report)	10
Canada Top Albums/CDs (RPM)	11
US Billboard 200	4

Chart (1990)	Peak position
Dutch Albums (Album Top 100)	9
UK Albums (Official Charts)	3

Chart (1993)	Peak position
Australian Albums (ARIA)	10
New Zealand Albums (RMNZ)	2
UK Albums (Official Charts)	66

Chart (2013)	Peak position
US Billboard 200	18

Chart (2017)	Peak position
Belgian Albums (Ultratop Flanders)	176

Chart (2020)	Peak position
US Top Rock Albums (Billboard)	7

Chart (2021)	Peak position
US Billboard 200	31

=== Year-end charts ===
Chart (1972)	Peak position
US Billboard 200	5

Chart (1973)	Peak position
US Billboard 200	48

Chart (2018)	Peak position
US Top Rock Albums (Billboard)	41

Chart (2019)	Peak position
US Top Rock Albums (Billboard)	29

Chart (2020)	Peak position
US Top Rock Albums (Billboard)	34

Chart (2021)	Peak position
US Top Rock Albums (Billboard)	38

== Certifications ==
Region	Certification	Certified units/sales
Australia (ARIA)	3× Platinum	210,000^{‡}
France (SNEP) Release titled Les Années Stones 1	Gold	100,000^{*}
New Zealand (RMNZ)	Platinum	15,000^{^}
United Kingdom (BPI)	2× Platinum	600,000^{^}
United States (RIAA)	12× Platinum	6,000,000^{^}
^{*} Sales figures based on certification alone.^{^} Shipments figures based on certification alone.^{‡} Sales+streaming figures based on certification alone.

== See also ==
- List of best-selling albums in the United States
- More Hot Rocks (Big Hits & Fazed Cookies)
