= The Singer Not the Song (song) =

- UK B-side label

Single by the Rolling Stones
- A-side: "Get Off of My Cloud"
- Released: 22 October 1965
- Recorded: September 1965
- Studio: RCA (Hollywood)
- Genre: Pop; folk rock
- Length: 2:22
- Label: Decca
- Songwriter: Jagger–Richards
- Producer: Andrew Loog Oldham

The Rolling Stones singles chronology
"(I Can't Get No) Satisfaction" (1965)	"Get Off of My Cloud" / "The Singer Not the Song" (1965)	"As Tears Go By" (1965)

"The Singer Not the Song" is a song by the English rock band the Rolling Stones. It was first released in the UK on 22 October 1965 as the B-side to their single "Get Off of My Cloud", while in the US it appeared the following month on the American-only album December's Children (And Everybody's). It was written by Mick Jagger and Keith Richards and features a poppier, melodic sound in comparison to the blues and R&B styles most associated with the band.

== Overview ==
According to authors Philippe Margotin and Jean-Michel Guesdon, "The Singer Not the Song" was recorded on either 5 or 6 September 1965, at RCA Studios in Hollywood, Los Angeles. The recording features Brian Jones on a Rickenbacker 12-string guitar and Richards on either an additional Harmony 12-string or a six-string acoustic, while Jagger's vocals are double-tracked throughout.

Richie Unterberger of AllMusic notes the track as an example of the band straying from their early blues and R&B roots, calling it a "tuneful, poppy, [and] romantic" song exhibiting similarities to both the "Merseybeat-like" compositions Jagger and Richards typically offered to other artists and their later, "more mature" tracks such as "Lady Jane" (1966) and "Ruby Tuesday" (1967). David Marchese of Vulture similarly categorizes the song as "gentle folk-rock". Margotin and Guesdon opine that the track contains "significant borrowings" from the Beatles' "Not a Second Time" (1963). Steve Appleford considers its title to be a "bold statement" which rings true as "the sixties began an era where a single performance of a song, specifically one captured on record, was viewed as THE definitive interpretation." Many writers have noted the presence of out-of-tune guitars and vocals throughout the performance.

== Reception and legacy ==
"The Singer Not the Song" has received mixed reviews from biographers and critics. A contemporary review in Record Mirror praised it for its "quieter tone and lots of charm". Unterberger reviewed the track positively, calling it a "fairly attractive British Invasion-like pop tune" with "hints of tenderness and vulnerability" in the lyrics and vocal performance. Marchese ranked it as the band's 156th-best song, acknowledging criticisms of the track for being "overly sappy" but personally finding it "sweet in a naïve beginner way". Conversely, Margotin and Guesdon feel it "falls flat" due to its "poor recording" and being "frightfully out of tune". Appleford also laments the out-of-tune recording, deeming the track unsuccessful despite Jagger's "slightly diverting vocal melody". Writer Alan Clayson disparaged it as a "twee jingle-jangle that should have been foisted on the type of also-ran acts who'd been interested in 'You Must Be the One', 'Shang-A-Doo-Lang', 'Will You Be My Lover Tonight' and other examples of Mick and Keith's early struggles as composers."

Fleetwood Mac guitarist Lindsey Buckingham has praised "The Singer Not the Song", including it alongside "She Smiled Sweetly" (1967) and "Blue Turns to Grey" (1965) in a group of Rolling Stones songs he had been "completely enamoured with". The song has since been included on the compilation albums No Stone Unturned (1973), Singles Collection: The London Years (1989), and Singles 1965–1967 (2004). It has been covered by acts including Alex Chilton and Patti Palladin.

== Personnel ==
Adapted from Margotin and Guesdon:

Musicians

- Mick Jagger – vocals
- Keith Richards – guitar, backing vocals
- Brian Jones – 12-string electric guitar
- Bill Wyman – bass
- Charlie Watts – drums

Technical

- Andrew Loog Oldham – production
- Dave Hassinger – sound engineer
