= More Hot Rocks (Big Hits & Fazed Cookies) =

Compilation album by the Rolling Stones
- Released: 18 December 1972
- Recorded: May 1963 – October 1969
- Genres: Rock; rhythm and blues; psychedelic pop; psychedelic rock
- Length: 79:45
- Label: London
- Producers: Andrew Loog Oldham; the Rolling Stones; Jimmy Miller; Eric Easton

The Rolling Stones chronology
Rock 'n' Rolling Stones (1972)	More Hot Rocks (Big Hits & Fazed Cookies) (1972)	Goats Head Soup (1973)

More Hot Rocks (Big Hits & Fazed Cookies) is a compilation album by The Rolling Stones released in December 1972 on London Records. The album was a follow-up to the successful Hot Rocks 1964–1971.

When Hot Rocks proved to be a big seller, there was never any doubt that a successor would follow. However, initially—with Andrew Loog Oldham getting involved—the project was to feature previously unreleased (or more accurately, discarded) material and be titled Necrophilia. Artwork was prepared and the album made it as far as the mastering phase when it was recalled and something a little more practical was compiled (ABKCO would revisit this concept with 1975's Metamorphosis). The result was More Hot Rocks (Big Hits & Fazed Cookies).

This was the second "post-contract" compilation released under the aegis of London/ABKCO Records after the termination of the Stones relationship with ABKCO and Decca Records. Because of the nature of the contract, the Rolling Stones lost all control over their pre-1971 recordings and this album was released without their input or consent. ABKCO and Decca would continue to release such un-authorized albums over the next several decades.

== Release and reception ==
Professional ratings
Review scores
Source	Rating
AllMusic	4.5/5 stars
Christgau's Record Guide	B+
The Rolling Stone Album Guide	5/5 stars
Select	4/5 medals
Tom Hull	A−

Featuring the hits that could not be shoehorned onto its predecessor, as well as first-time release of many previously UK-only releases, the double album was quickly pressed and distributed into North American shops in December 1972, reaching No. 9 in the US and going gold. Like Hot Rocks 1964–1971, More Hot Rocks (Big Hits & Fazed Cookies) would not see an official UK release until 21 May 1990.

AllMusic's Richie Unterberger writes in his review "More Hot Rocks goes for the somewhat smaller hits, some of the better album tracks, and a whole LP side's worth of rarities that hadn't yet been available in the United States when this compilation was released in 1972."

"Despite the unfathomable choices, random LP tracks, peculiar chronology ('64 through to '69, then back to '63/'64 again) and the feeling that the real stormers are elsewhere (on 'Vol 1', that is), it's an irresistible listen," wrote Select's Andrew Perry of the 1990 CD release, concluding, "A weird arrangement of quality goods."

== Liner notes ==
Andrew Loog Oldham's liner notes, as preserved on the CD releases, read:

Way back when / the sleepy owls of the brill building / brillcreamed and braincreamed that melody was coming back / and lo it had / it flew past their windows yesterday / as Paulie, a bebeatled ballade / Lennon's advocate for the Kalin Twins (who is the other jaggered half?) / seen so far away / and today will never come to the Judas Iscariots / who mock the hands that feed them / from here within / December's Children and the Aftermath of the war of the parking lots / stay away from new caddies, they're faulty / stick with our original edsel / the 17 + 8 / 8 from the brown cookie bag baked yesteryear and preserved and never before sold in your local deli / that remained (excuse me Mr Gershwin, I need another dime) standards of yesterday and now / good times, bad times to you all and have you seen your mother baby, balling in the alley

== Track listing ==
All songs by Mick Jagger and Keith Richards, except where noted.

Side one
No.	Title	Writer(s)	Length
1.	"Tell Me" (Recorded 1964 / Edited version from US single release / UK: The Rolling Stones (released 1964) / US: England's Newest Hitmakers and single (both released 1964))		3:47
2.	"Not Fade Away" (Recorded 1964 / UK: single (released 1964) / US: England's Newest Hitmakers and single (both released 1964))	Charles Hardin, Norman Petty	1:48
3.	"The Last Time" (Recorded 1965 / UK: single (released 1965) / US: Out of Our Heads and single (both released 1965))		3:41
4.	"It's All Over Now" (Recorded 1964 / UK: single (released 1964) / US: 12 × 5 and single (both released 1964))	Bobby Womack, Shirley Jean Womack	3:27
5.	"Good Times, Bad Times" (Recorded 1964 / UK: B-side of "It's All Over Now" (released 1964) / US: 12 X 5 and B-side of "It's All Over Now" (both released 1964))		2:30
6.	"I'm Free" (Recorded 1965 / UK: Out of Our Heads (released 1965) / US: December's Children (And Everybody's) and B-side of "Get Off of My Cloud" (both released 1965))		2:24

Side two
No.	Title	Length
1.	"Out of Time" (Recorded 1966 / edited version from Flowers / UK: Aftermath (released 1966) / US: Flowers (released 1967))	3:42
2.	"Lady Jane" (Recorded 1966 / UK: Aftermath (released 1966) / US: Aftermath, B-side of "Mother's Little Helper" (both released 1966) and Flowers (released 1967))	3:08
3.	"Sittin' on a Fence" (Recorded 1965 / UK: Through the Past, Darkly (Big Hits Vol. 2) (released 1969) / US: Flowers (released 1967))	3:03
4.	"Have You Seen Your Mother, Baby, Standing in the Shadow?" (Recorded 1966 / UK: single (released 1966) / US: single (released 1966) and Flowers (released 1967))	2:35
5.	"Dandelion" (Recorded 1967 / UK & US: single (released 1967))	3:32
6.	"We Love You" (Recorded 1967 / UK & US: single (released 1967))	4:22

Side three
No.	Title	Length
1.	"She's a Rainbow" (Recorded 1967 / edited version, without the announcer intro / UK: Their Satanic Majesties Request (released 1967) / US: Their Satanic Majesties Request and single (both released 1967))	4:12
2.	"2000 Light Years from Home" (Recorded 1967 / UK: Their Satanic Majesties Request (released 1967) / US: Their Satanic Majesties Request and B-side of "She's a Rainbow" (both released 1967))	4:45
3.	"Child of the Moon" (rmk) (Recorded 1968 / UK & US: B-side of "Jumpin' Jack Flash" (released 1968))	3:10
4.	"No Expectations" (Recorded 1968 / UK & US: Beggars Banquet (released 1968))	3:56
5.	"Let It Bleed" (Recorded 1969 / UK & US: Let It Bleed (released 1969))	5:28

Side Four
No.	Title	Writer(s)	Length
1.	"What to Do" (Recorded 1966 / UK: Aftermath (released 1966) / US: previously unreleased)		2:33
2.	"Money" (Recorded 1963 / UK: The Rolling Stones EP (released 1964) / US: previously unreleased)	Berry Gordy Jr., Janie Bradford	2:18
3.	"Come On" (Recorded 1963 / UK: single (released 1963) / US: previously unreleased)	Chuck Berry	2:32
4.	"Fortune Teller" (Recorded 1963 / UK: Saturday Club various artists LP (released 1964) / US: previously unreleased)	Naomi Neville	1:48
5.	"Poison Ivy" (Recorded 1963 / UK: Saturday Club various artists LP (released 1963) / US: previously unreleased)	Jerry Leiber, Mike Stoller	2:34
6.	"Bye Bye Johnnie" (Recorded 1963 / UK: The Rolling Stones EP (released 1964) / US: previously unreleased)	Chuck Berry	2:10
7.	"I Can't Be Satisfied" (Recorded 1964 / UK: The Rolling Stones No. 2 (released 1965) / US: previously unreleased)	McKinley Morganfield	3:28
8.	"Long, Long While" (Recorded 1966 / UK: B-side of "Paint It Black" (released 1966) / US: previously unreleased)		3:01

All tracks on sides one, two, and four were produced by Andrew Loog Oldham, except "Money" and "Bye Bye Johnnie", which were produced by Eric Easton. Side three was produced by Jimmy Miller, except tracks "She's a Rainbow" and "2000 Light Years from Home", produced by the Rolling Stones. "Poison Ivy" is version 1, although not designated as such on the 1972 release.

== 2002 bonus tracks ==
In August 2002, More Hot Rocks (Big Hits & Fazed Cookies) was reissued in a new remastered CD and SACD digipak by ABKCO Records with the addition of three bonus tracks: "Everybody Needs Somebody to Love", from The Rolling Stones No. 2, a different, longer take than the version on the 1965 US release The Rolling Stones, Now!; "Poison Ivy" (version 2) from The Rolling Stones EP; and "I've Been Loving You Too Long", recorded in 1965, and later overdubbed with audience noise for the 1966 American-only live album Got Live If You Want It!. "Poison Ivy" (version 2) was produced by Eric Easton, while the other two bonus tracks were produced by Andrew Loog Oldham. In addition to the three bonus tracks, the songs on CD two after "What to Do" were re-ordered as follows:

CD two
No.	Title	Writer(s)	Length
1.	"She's a Rainbow" (Edited version, without the announcer intro)		4:12
2.	"2000 Light Years from Home"		4:45
3.	"Child of the Moon" (rmk)		3:10
4.	"No Expectations"		3:56
5.	"Let It Bleed"		5:28
6.	"What to Do"		2:33
7.	"Fortune Teller"	Naomi Neville	1:48
8.	"Poison Ivy (version 1)"	Jerry Leiber, Mike Stoller	2:34
9.	"Everybody Needs Somebody to Love" (Long version released on the UK album The Rolling Stones No. 2 in 1965.)	Solomon Burke, Bert Berns, Jerry Wexler	5:03
10.	"Come On"	Chuck Berry	2:32
11.	"Money"	Berry Gordy Jr., Janie Bradford	2:18
12.	"Bye Bye Johnnie"	Chuck Berry	2:10
13.	"Poison Ivy (version 2)" (Recorded November 1963, released on the UK EP The Rolling Stones in 1964.)	Jerry Leiber, Mike Stoller	2:06
14.	"I've Been Loving You Too Long" (Audience noise removed from version released on Got Live If You Want It! in 1966.)	Otis Redding, Jerry Butler	2:54
15.	"I Can't Be Satisfied"	McKinley Morganfield	3:28
16.	"Long, Long While"		3:01

== Charts ==
Chart performance for More Hot Rocks (Big Hits & Fazed Cookies)
Chart (1973)	Peak position
Canada Top Albums/CDs (RPM)	3
US Billboard 200	9

== Certifications ==
Certifications for More Hot Rocks (Big Hits & Fazed Cookies)
Region	Certification	Certified units/sales
United States (RIAA)	Gold	500,000^{^}
^{^} Shipments figures based on certification alone.
