= Rock 'n' Rolling Stones =

Compilation album by the Rolling Stones
- Released: 13 October 1972
- Recorded: 1963–1965 and 1969
- Genre: Rock
- Language: English
- Label: Decca
- Producer: Andrew Loog Oldham; the Rolling Stones; Glyn Johns

The Rolling Stones chronology
Exile on Main St. (1972)	Rock 'n' Rolling Stones (1972)	More Hot Rocks (Big Hits & Fazed Cookies) (1972)

Professional ratings
Review scores
Source	Rating
AllMusic	3/5 stars

Rock 'n' Rolling Stones is a compilation album by the Rolling Stones released in 1972. It reached number 41 in the UK Albums Chart.

The album contains five Chuck Berry covers and also Berry-related songs like "Route 66" and "Down the Road Apiece". The album was the second "post-contract" album released by Decca following the end of their relationship with the Stones in 1971. Because of the nature of the contract, the band lost all control over their recordings prior to 1971, which are held jointly by Decca and ABKCO Records. Both Decca and ABKCO would continue to release compilations over the next several decades.

== Track listing ==
Side one

1. "Route 66" (Bobby Troup)
2. "The Under Assistant West Coast Promotion Man" (Nanker Phelge)
3. "Come On" (Chuck Berry)
4. "Talkin' About You" (Chuck Berry)
5. "Bye Bye Johnny" (Chuck Berry)
6. "Down the Road Apiece" (Don Raye)

Side two

1. "I Just Want to Make Love to You" (Willie Dixon)
2. "Everybody Needs Somebody to Love" (Bert Russell (Bert Berns), Solomon Burke, Jerry Wexler)
3. "Oh Baby (We Got a Good Thing Goin')" (Barbara Lynn Ozen)
4. "19th Nervous Breakdown" (Mick Jagger, Keith Richards)
5. "Little Queenie" (live) (Chuck Berry)
6. "Carol" (live) (Chuck Berry)

== Charts ==
Chart (1972)	Peak position
Australian Albums (Kent Music Report)	49
UK Albums (OCC)	41
