= Gimme Shelter (album) =

Compilation album by The Rolling Stones
- Released: 16 August 1971
- Recorded: 1966–1969
- Genre: Rock
- Language: English
- Label: Decca
- Producer: Andrew Loog Oldham and Jimmy Miller

The Rolling Stones chronology
Sticky Fingers (1971)	Gimme Shelter (1971)	Hot Rocks 1964–1971 (1971)

Professional ratings
Review scores
Source	Rating
AllMusic	1.5/5 stars

Gimme Shelter is a compilation album by the Rolling Stones, released on Decca Records in 1971. It reached number 19 on the UK Albums Chart.

This is not a soundtrack album from the film of the same name. Side one is composed of previously released studio recordings from 1968 and 1969. Side two consists of tracks previously released on the US live album Got Live If You Want It! in 1966.

== Track listing ==
All tracks composed by Mick Jagger and Keith Richards except where noted.

Side one

1. "Jumpin' Jack Flash"
2. "Love in Vain" (Robert Johnson)
3. "Honky Tonk Women"
4. "Street Fighting Man"
5. "Sympathy for the Devil"
6. "Gimme Shelter"

Side two

1. "Under My Thumb"
2. "Time Is on My Side" (Norman Meade)
3. "I've Been Loving You Too Long" (Otis Redding, Jerry Butler)
4. "Fortune Teller" (Naomi Neville)
5. "Lady Jane"
6. "(I Can't Get No) Satisfaction"

== Charts ==
Chart (1971)	Peak position
Japanese Albums (Oricon)	30
UK Albums (OCC)	19
