= Got Live If You Want It! (EP) =

EP (live) by the Rolling Stones
- Released: 11 June 1965
- Recorded: 5–7 March 1965
- Genre: Rock
- Length: 10:03
- Label: Decca
- Producer: Andrew Loog Oldham

The Rolling Stones chronology
The Rolling Stones No. 2 (1965)	Got Live If You Want It! (1965)	Out of Our Heads (1965)

Got Live If You Want It! (stylized on the front cover as got LIVE if you want it!) is a six-track, four-song extended play (EP) release by the Rolling Stones featuring live recordings from 1965. The title is a pun on the swamp blues song "I Got Love If You Want It" by Slim Harpo; the Stones recorded his "I'm a King Bee" for their 1964 debut album. Got Live If You Want It! reached number one in the UK and was the group's last EP.

Although not issued in the US, three of its songs were included on albums released there by London Records in 1965: "I'm Alright" on Out of Our Heads; and "Route 66" and "I'm Moving On" on December's Children (And Everybody's). With different tracks mostly recorded in 1966, London used the title for a live album released in December 1966.

== Recording ==
Renowned for its raw-sounding quality, Got Live If You Want It! has endured as a live artifact, more for its historical than musical appeal. Reportedly engineer Glyn Johns had hung microphones over the balcony for the recording; however, this is called into question as "I'm Alright" on the Got Live If You Want It! LP (recorded and released a year later) contains the same backing track but with different vocals. This would have been impossible if the recordings were made as described. Additionally, "I'm Moving On" features (at the very least) a harmonica overdub as the instrument can be heard underneath Jagger's vocal during the first verse while Brian Jones (the group's other harmonica player) is playing slide guitar. These two tracks may even be studio recordings re-tooled to give the impression of being live. The lack of studio documentation relating to the Stones' Decca recordings makes this difficult to confirm, but this approach was used the following year on the US Got Live If You Want It! LP.

== Release and reception ==
Professional ratings
Review scores
Source	Rating
AllMusic	3/5 stars

In a review for AllMusic, Richie Unterberger gave the EP three out of five stars. He noted, "The EP was crudely recorded, but the raw energy of the group's early performances does shine through, particularly on the two best tracks, the cover of Hank Snow's 'I'm Moving On', and [Bo Diddley's] 'I'm Alright'."

Unavailable for decades, Got Live If You Want It! was reissued on CD in 2004 on the Singles 1963–1965 box set. In November 2010, it was made available digitally and in 2011 as part of the 60's UK EP Collection digital compilation. On 29 November 2013, the EP was reissued on 7-inch vinyl record as a part of Record Store Day Black Friday 2013.

== Track listing ==
Side one
No.	Title	Writer(s)	Length
1.	"We Want the Stones" (Audience chanting, not a Stones performance)	Nanker Phelge a.k.a. The Rolling Stones	0:13
2.	"Everybody Needs Somebody to Love"	Solomon Burke, Jerry Wexler, Bert Russell a.k.a. Bert Berns	0:36
3.	"Pain in My Heart"	Naomi Neville a.k.a. Allen Toussaint	2:03
4.	"Route 66"	Bobby Troup	2:36

Side two
No.	Title	Writer(s)	Length
1.	"I'm Moving On"	Hank Snow	2:13
2.	"I'm Alright"	Ellas McDaniel a.k.a. Bo Diddley	2:22

== Personnel ==
The Rolling Stones

- Mick Jagger – lead vocals, harmonica, percussion
- Keith Richards – guitars, backing vocals
- Brian Jones – guitars, backing vocals
- Bill Wyman – bass guitar, backing vocals
- Charlie Watts – drums

== Chart positions ==
Year	Chart	Position
1965	Finland (Soumen Virallinen)	30
1965	UK EP Chart	1
