= The Rolling Stones No. 2 =

Studio album by the Rolling Stones
- Released: 15 January 1965
- Recorded: June–November 1964
- Studio: Chess, Chicago; Regent Sound, London; RCA (Hollywood)
- Genre: Rock and roll; R&B; blues rock
- Length: 36:58
- Label: Decca
- Producer: Andrew Loog Oldham

The Rolling Stones UK chronology
| Five by Five (1964) | The Rolling Stones No. 2 (1965) | Got Live If You Want It! (1965) |

Professional ratings
Review scores
| Source | Rating |
|---|---|
| AllMusic | 4.5/5 stars |
| Tom Hull | B+ |

The Rolling Stones No. 2 is the second studio album by the English rock band the Rolling Stones, released on 15 January 1965 following the success of their 1964 debut album, The Rolling Stones. It contains three compositions from the still-developing Mick Jagger/Keith Richards songwriting team, with all the other songs being covers of American R&B and rock and roll numbers, similar to the first album.

== Description ==
On Dutch and German pressings of the album, the title is listed as The Rolling Stones Vol. 2 on the front cover, although the back of the album cover lists the title as The Rolling Stones No. 2. There is also a Dutch pressing titled The Rolling Stones No. 3.

Using the cover shot for 12 × 5, the second US-released album in October 1964, The Rolling Stones No. 2's track listing would largely be emulated on the upcoming US release of The Rolling Stones, Now!. While Eric Easton was co-credited as producer alongside Andrew Loog Oldham on the band's debut album, Oldham takes full production duties for this album, which was recorded sporadically in the UK and US during 1964.

A huge hit in the UK upon release, The Rolling Stones No. 2 spent 10 weeks at No. 1 in early 1965, becoming one of the year's biggest sellers in the UK. According to Bill Wyman in his book Stone Alone: The Story of a Rock 'n' Roll Band, John Lennon said of The Rolling Stones No. 2: "The album's great, but I don't like five-minute numbers."

The Muddy Waters cover "I Can't Be Satisfied" was not included on any of the band's original American albums, and was not officially released in the US until 1972 on the compilation More Hot Rocks (Big Hits & Fazed Cookies).

Due to ABKCO's preference for the American albums, they overlooked both The Rolling Stones and The Rolling Stones No. 2 for CD release in 1986 and during its remastering series in 2002. Consequently, this album was out of print for many years and was thus widely bootlegged by collectors. It was again made available to the public as part of a limited edition vinyl box set, titled The Rolling Stones 1964–1969, in November 2010 and (by itself) digitally at the same time. The original title was also reinstated as part of The Rolling Stones in Mono box set, released on 30 September 2016.

== Track listing ==
Side one
| No. | Title | Writer(s) | Length |
|---|---|---|---|
| 1. | "Everybody Needs Somebody to Love" | Bert Berns; Solomon Burke; Jerry Wexler | 5:03 |
| 2. | "Down Home Girl" | Jerry Leiber; Artie Butler | 4:11 |
| 3. | "You Can't Catch Me" | Chuck Berry | 3:38 |
| 4. | "Time Is on My Side" ("guitar intro" version) | Norman Meade | 2:58 |
| 5. | "What a Shame" | Jagger–Richards | 3:03 |
| 6. | "Grown Up Wrong" | Jagger–Richards | 1:50 |
| Total length: | | | 20:43 |

Side two
| No. | Title | Writer(s) | Length |
|---|---|---|---|
| 1. | "Down the Road Apiece" | Don Raye | 2:55 |
| 2. | "Under the Boardwalk" | Artie Resnick; Kenny Young | 2:48 |
| 3. | "I Can't Be Satisfied" | Muddy Waters | 3:26 |
| 4. | "Pain in My Heart" | Allen Toussaint | 2:11 |
| 5. | "Off the Hook" | Jagger–Richards | 2:38 |
| 6. | "Susie Q" | Dale Hawkins; Stan Lewis; Eleanor Broadwater | 1:51 |
| Total length: | | | 15:49 |

== Personnel ==
Track numbers noted in parentheses below are based on the CD track numbering.

The Rolling Stones

- Mick Jagger – lead vocals (all tracks), harmonica (2, 5, 6), tambourine (1, 4)
- Keith Richards – electric guitar (all tracks), backing vocals (1, 4, 6, 8, 11), acoustic guitar (8)
- Brian Jones – electric guitar (except 8), percussion (8)
- Bill Wyman – bass guitar (all tracks), backing vocals (4)
- Charlie Watts – drums (all tracks)

Additional personnel

- Jack Nitzsche – piano (2, 10)
- Ian Stewart – piano (1, 5, 7), organ (4)
- David Bailey – cover photography

== Recording studios ==
- Chess Studios, Chicago: 10–11 June & 8 November 1964
- Regent Sound Studios, London: 2, 28–29 September 1964
- RCA Studios, Hollywood: 2 November 1964

== Charts ==
| Chart (1965) | Peak position |
|---|---|
| Finland (The Official Finnish Charts) | 2 |
| German Albums (Offizielle Top 100) | 1 |
| Italian Albums (HitParadeItalia) | 1 |
| UK Albums (OCC) | 1 |
