= Get Off of My Cloud =

- US single picture sleeve

Single by the Rolling Stones

from the album December's Children (And Everybody's)
- B-side: "I'm Free" (US); "The Singer Not the Song" (UK)
- Released: 24 September 1965 (US); 22 October 1965 (UK)
- Recorded: 6–7 September 1965
- Studio: RCA (Hollywood, California)
- Genre: Blues rock
- Length: 2:55
- Label: London (US); Decca (UK)
- Songwriter: Jagger–Richards
- Producer: Andrew Loog Oldham

Rolling Stones US singles chronology
| "(I Can't Get No) Satisfaction" (1965) | "Get Off of My Cloud" (1965) | "As Tears Go By" (1965) |

Rolling Stones UK singles chronology
| "(I Can't Get No) Satisfaction" (1965) | "Get Off of My Cloud" (1965) | "19th Nervous Breakdown" (1966) |

Alternative cover
- UK single

"Get Off of My Cloud" is a song by the English rock band the Rolling Stones. It was written by Mick Jagger and Keith Richards for a single to follow the successful "(I Can't Get No) Satisfaction". Recorded at RCA Studios in Hollywood, California, in early September 1965, the song was released in September in the United States and October in the United Kingdom. It topped the charts in the US, UK, Canada, and Germany and reached number two in several other countries.

== Composition ==
The Stones have said that the song is a reaction to their suddenly greatly enhanced popularity and deals with their aversion to people's expectations of them after the success of "Satisfaction". Richards commented: "'Get Off of My Cloud' was basically a response to people knocking on our door asking us for the follow-up to 'Satisfaction' ... We thought 'At last. We can sit back and maybe think about events'. Suddenly there's the knock at the door and of course what came out of that was 'Get Off of My Cloud'". In 1971 he added:

I never dug it as a record. The chorus was a nice idea, but we rushed it as the follow-up. We were in L.A. [Los Angeles, where "(I Can't Get No) Satisfaction" was recorded], and it was time for another single. But how do you follow-up "Satisfaction"? Actually, what I wanted was to do it slow, like a Lee Dorsey thing. We rocked it up. I thought it was one of Andrew Loog Oldham's worst productions.

Some years later, British bluesman Alexis Korner would cover the song in a slower style much like Richards had originally intended.

In a 1995 interview with Rolling Stone, Jagger said, "That was Keith's melody and my lyrics ... It's a stop-bugging-me, post-teenage-alienation song. The grown-up world was a very ordered society in the early '60s, and I was coming out of it. America was even more ordered than anywhere else. I found it was a very restrictive society in thought and behavior and dress."

I was sick and tired, fed up with this and decided to take a drive downtown
It was so very quiet and peaceful, there was nobody, not a soul around
I laid myself out, I was so tired and I started to dream
In the morning the parking tickets were just like flags stuck on my windscreen

The song opens with a drum intro by Charlie Watts and twin guitars by Brian Jones and Richards. Ultimate Classic Rock critic Michael Gallucci called this Watts' best drumming performance, saying that it has "one of the most unconventional drum structures ever employed in a Top 40 hit" in which Watts basically plays the same 4/4-beat-fill-4/4-beat-fill pattern throughout the song" and does not break the beat even once.

== Personnel ==
According to authors Philippe Margotin and Jean-Michel Guesdon, except where noted:

The Rolling Stones

- Mick Jagger – vocals
- Keith Richards – rhythm guitar, backing vocals
- Brian Jones – twelve-string electric guitar (Rickenbacker 360/12), lead guitar, acoustic guitar
- Bill Wyman – bass, backing vocals
- Charlie Watts – drums

Additional musicians

- Ian Stewart – piano
- Unidentified musician(s) – hand claps

== Release ==
The 1965 single release was a major success for the Rolling Stones. In the US, the single reached number one on the Billboard Hot 100 on 6 November 1965, and remained there for two weeks. The song was included on the band's next American album, December's Children (And Everybody's), released in December 1965. The song stayed at number one in the UK Singles Chart for three weeks in November that year. Billboard described the song as a "wild, far out beat number which will have no trouble topping their 'Satisfaction' smash". Cash Box described it as a "rollicking, fast-moving blues-soaked thumper with an infectious danceable beat" that should be another success after "Satisfaction". Record World said that "The Rolling Stones dispense some more of their very thick and funky rock."

Appearances on later Stones releases include:

- Got Live If You Want It! (live album, 1966)
- Big Hits (High Tide and Green Grass) (compilation album, 1966)
- Hot Rocks 1964–1971 (compilation album, 1971)
- 30 Greatest Hits (compilation album, 1977)
- Singles Collection: The London Years (compilation album, 1989)
- Forty Licks (compilation album, 2002)
- The Biggest Bang (live DVD-set, 2007)
- GRRR! (compilation album, 2012)

== Charts ==
=== Weekly charts ===
| Chart (1965–1966) | Peak position |
|---|---|
| Australia (Kent Music Report) | 2 |
| Austria (Ö3 Austria Top 40) | 5 |
| Belgium (Ultratop 50 Flanders) | 6 |
| Canada Top Singles (RPM) | 1 |
| Finland (Soumen Virallinen) | 2 |
| Germany (GfK) | 1 |
| Ireland (IRMA) | 2 |
| Netherlands (Single Top 100) | 2 |
| New Zealand (Lever Hit Parade) | 2 |
| Norway (VG-lista) | 2 |
| South Africa (Springbok) | 1 |
| Sweden (Kvällstoppen) | 2 |
| Sweden (Tio i Topp) | 2 |
| UK Singles (Official Charts) | 1 |
| US Billboard Hot 100 | 1 |
| US Cash Box Top 100 | 1 |

=== Year-end charts ===
| Chart (1965) | Rank |
|---|---|
| US (Joel Whitburn's Pop Annual) | 13 |
