= Roddy Jackson =

American singer-songwriter and musician (1942–2022)

- Born: George Rodrick Jackson; April 9, 1942; Fresno, California, U.S.
- Died: December 7, 2022 (aged 80)
- Genres: Rock and roll, rockabilly
- Occupation(s): Singer, musician
- Instrument(s): Piano, saxophone, vocals
- Years active: 1954–1960s 1990s–2022
- Labels: Specialty
- Formerly of: The Merced Blue Notes; Sonny Bono

George Rodrick Jackson (April 9, 1942 – December 7, 2022) was an American rockabilly and rock and roll singer, songwriter, pianist and saxophonist, who recorded for Specialty Records in the 1950s.

== Life and career ==
=== Early life ===
Roddy Jackson was born in Fresno, California, moving to Merced as a child. His father was a singer and pianist who toured with The Sons of the Pioneers. Jackson learned to play drums and piano, forming his first group, The Dreamers, when aged 12 in 1954, and began performing on radio station KYOS. He also learned to play clarinet, trumpet and trombone, but concentrated on the alto saxophone and later tenor sax.

In 1956, after becoming influenced by Fats Domino and Little Richard, he formed a new multi-racial rock and roll band, the Blue Notes, from among his friends at high school. They quickly became popular around Merced, and were mentored by local fire chief George Coolures, who helped win them an audition at Specialty Records with the label's A&R man, Sonny Bono. Bono convinced label owner Art Rupe to sign Jackson as a solo artist, but not the rest of the Blue Notes. The Blue Notes continued to perform with Jackson for a while, but did not play on his records. After Jackson left the band, Coolures replaced him on stage, and, renamed as the Merced Blue Notes, they remained a popular live act in the area into the 1960s.

=== Specialty years ===
Jackson's first session as a solo singer was in December 1957, when he recorded Sonny Bono's composition "I've Got My Sights on Someone New" with a band comprising René Hall (guitar), Red Callender (bass), and Earl Palmer (drums). Backed by "Love at First Sight", the record became a regional hit, and Decca Records tried to buy out his recording contract, but Rupe refused and also turned down an offer for Jackson to appear on Dick Clark's American Bandstand. Jackson returned to the studio in September 1958 to record his second single, "Hiccups", a novelty song written by studio pianist Al Hazan (who later featured on the hit "Nut Rocker" credited to B. Bumble and the Stingers) and produced, like his other records, by Bono. However, the record failed to chart, a fate also suffered by his third Specialty single, "Any Old Town" / "Gloria", recorded in March 1959 with Hall, Palmer, and saxophonist Lee Allen.

According to writer Steve Leggett, "Jackson was the real deal, an exciting performer who shouted out his material with explosive force, pummelling the piano like it was a personal threat to his well-being, and occasionally showing off his considerable saxophone skills as well." Jackson also wrote songs, co-writing Larry Williams' "She Said Yeah" with Sonny Bono, who used the pseudonym Don Christy; the song was later recorded by The Rolling Stones, The Animals and others.

=== Later life and death ===
Jackson continued to make occasional local performances. He re-emerged more publicly in the 1990s, and started making regular festival appearances in the United Kingdom, France, and elsewhere. A compilation album, Central Valley Fireball, comprising his Specialty singles together with unreleased recordings, was issued by Ace Records in 2007. In 2019 VLV Records released a CD of new recordings under the title Consider.

Jackson died on December 7, 2022, at the age of 80.

== Discography ==
=== Singles ===
"I've Got My Sights on Someone New" / "Love at First Sight" (Specialty 623, 1958)
"Hiccups" / "There's A Moose on the Loose" (Specialty 649, 1958)
"Any Old Town" / "Gloria" (Specialty 666, 1959)

=== Compilation album ===
Central Valley Fireball (Ace 1161 (UK), 2007)
