= December's Children (And Everybody's) =

Studio album by the Rolling Stones
- Released: November 1965 (Note: The authors Philippe Margotin and Jean-Michel Guesdon list the release date as 4 December 1965, but contemporary sources indicate the album was released in November.)
- Recorded: 8 August 1963 – 26 October 1965
- Studios: RCA, Hollywood; Decca, London; Chess, Chicago; IBC, London
- Genre: Rock
- Length: 29:04
- Label: London
- Producer: Andrew Loog Oldham

The Rolling Stones US album chronology
Out of Our Heads (1965)	December's Children (And Everybody's) (1965)	Big Hits (High Tide and Green Grass) (1966)

Singles from December's Children (And Everybody's)
- 1. "Get Off of My Cloud" Released: 24 September 1965; 2. "As Tears Go By" Released: 18 December 1965

December's Children (And Everybody's) is the fifth American studio album by the English rock band the Rolling Stones, released in November 1965. It is primarily compiled from different released tracks from across the band's recording career up to that point, including the UK version of Out of Our Heads. Bassist Bill Wyman quotes Jagger in 1968 calling the record "[not] an album, it's just a collection of songs". Accordingly, it is only briefly detailed in Wyman's otherwise exhaustive book Rolling with the Stones. It features their then-recent transatlantic hit single "Get Off of My Cloud", as well as their own remake of Marianne Faithfull's Jagger/Richards-penned hit "As Tears Go By", which was released as the album's second single in the US.

== Recording and music ==
It is the last of the group's early releases to feature numerous cover songs; writers Mick Jagger and Keith Richards wrote only half of the songs themselves. There had been no sessions to record the LP; many of the songs were from the UK edition of Out of Our Heads recorded in September 1965 in Los Angeles. Many of the tracks had appeared earlier in the UK versions of Rolling Stones albums or had been released on singles or EPs, but had not been heard in the American market; other tracks were unreleased tracks that had been recorded during other recording sessions.

== Title and packaging ==
The title of the album came from the band's manager, Andrew Loog Oldham (who facetiously credits it to "Lou Folk-Rock Adler" in his liner notes on the back cover). According to Jagger, it was Oldham's idea of hip, Beat poetry. The front cover photo of the band, by Gered Mankowitz, had previously been used for the UK edition of Out of Our Heads.

== Release and reception ==
Professional ratings
Review scores
Source	Rating
AllMusic	4.5/5 stars
The Rolling Stone Album Guide	4.5/5 stars
MusicHound Rock	4/5 stars
The Encyclopedia of Popular Music	4/5 stars
Tom Hull	A−

December's Children (And Everybody's) reached No. 4 in the US, where it was certified gold. The group's second US No. 1, Get Off of My Cloud, was the highest-charting single on the album, also a major chart topper in the band's native UK and several other markets.

In August 2002, the album was reissued in a new remastered CD and SACD digipak by ABKCO Records. "Look What You've Done" remains the album's only cut issued in true stereo.

== Track listing ==
All tracks are written by Mick Jagger and Keith Richards, except where noted.

Side one
No.	Title	Writer(s)	Original release	Length
1.	"She Said Yeah"	Sonny Bono; Roddy Jackson	Out of Our Heads (UK)	1:30
2.	"Talkin' About You"	Chuck Berry	Out of Our Heads (UK)	2:30
3.	"You Better Move On"	Arthur Alexander	The Rolling Stones EP (UK)	2:37
4.	"Look What You've Done"	Muddy Waters	December's Children	2:33
5.	"The Singer Not the Song"		B-side of "Get Off of My Cloud" (UK)	2:22
6.	"Route 66"	Bobby Troup	Got Live If You Want It! (UK live EP)	2:29
Total length:				14:01

Side two
No.	Title	Writer(s)	Original release	Length
7.	"Get Off of My Cloud"		single (US)	2:52
8.	"I'm Free"		Out of Our Heads (UK)	2:17
9.	"As Tears Go By"	Jagger; Richards; Andrew Loog Oldham	December's Children	2:45
10.	"Gotta Get Away"		Out of Our Heads (UK)	2:03
11.	"Blue Turns to Grey"		December's Children	2:27
12.	"I'm Moving On"	Hank Snow	Got Live If You Want It! (UK live EP)	2:12
Total length:				14:36

== Recording sessions ==
Most of the songs were recorded 5–6 September 1965 at the RCA Records studio in Hollywood, California, except:

- "You Better Move On" – 8 August 1963, Decca Studios, London
- "Look What You've Done" – 11 June 1964, Chess Records studio, Chicago
- "Route 66" and "I'm Moving On" – 5–7 March 1965, live performances, England
- "As Tears Go By" – 26 October 1965, IBC Studios, London

== Personnel ==
The Rolling Stones

- Mick Jagger – lead vocals (all tracks), backing vocals (1–2, 7–8, 10–11), tambourine (10)
- Keith Richards – electric guitar (all but 9), acoustic guitar (5, 9), backing vocals (1–2, 5–8, 10–12), co-lead vocals (5)
- Brian Jones – electric guitar (1–2, 5–8, 11), acoustic guitar (3, 10), slide guitar (12), harmonica (4, 12), organ (8), backing vocals (3)
- Bill Wyman – bass guitar (all but 9), backing vocals (3)
- Charlie Watts – drums (all but 9)

Additional personnel

- Ian Stewart – piano (2–4, 7)
- Mike Leander – string arrangement (9)

== Charts ==
Chart performance for December's Children (And Everybody's)
Chart (1966)	Peak position
US Billboard 200	4

== Certifications ==
Certifications for December's Children (And Everybody's)
Region	Certification	Certified units/sales
United States (RIAA)	Gold	500,000^{^}
^{^} Shipments figures based on certification alone.
