= As Tears Go By (song) =

1964 pop song

- Dutch single picture sleeve

Single by Marianne Faithfull
- B-side: "Greensleeves"
- Released: June 1964
- Genre: Baroque pop
- Length: 2:33
- Label: Decca
- Songwriters: Jagger–Richards; Andrew Loog Oldham
- Producer: Andrew Loog Oldham

Marianne Faithfull singles chronology
"As Tears Go By" (1964)	"Blowin' in the Wind" (1964)

Official audio
- "As Tears Go By" (Official Lyric Video) on YouTube

"As Tears Go By"

Single by the Rolling Stones
- A-side: "19th Nervous Breakdown" (UK)
- B-side: "Gotta Get Away" (US)
- Released: 18 December 1965 (US); 4 February 1966 (UK)
- Recorded: 26 October 1965
- Studio: IBC, London
- Genre: Baroque rock; folk rock; pop
- Length: 2:45
- Label: London (US); Decca (UK)
- Songwriters: Jagger–Richards; Andrew Loog Oldham
- Producer: Andrew Loog Oldham

The Rolling Stones US singles chronology
"Get Off of My Cloud" (1965)	"As Tears Go By" (1965)	"19th Nervous Breakdown" (1966)

The Rolling Stones UK singles chronology
"Get Off of My Cloud" (1965)	"19th Nervous Breakdown" / "As Tears Go By" (1966)	"Paint It Black" (1966)

"As Tears Go By" is a song written by Mick Jagger, Keith Richards, and Rolling Stones' manager Andrew Loog Oldham. Marianne Faithfull recorded and released it as a single in the United Kingdom in 1964. Her song peaked at number nine on both the UK and Irish singles charts. Later, the Rolling Stones recorded their own version, which was included on the American album December's Children (And Everybody's). London Records released it as a single, which reached number six in the Billboard Hot 100 singles chart.

== History ==
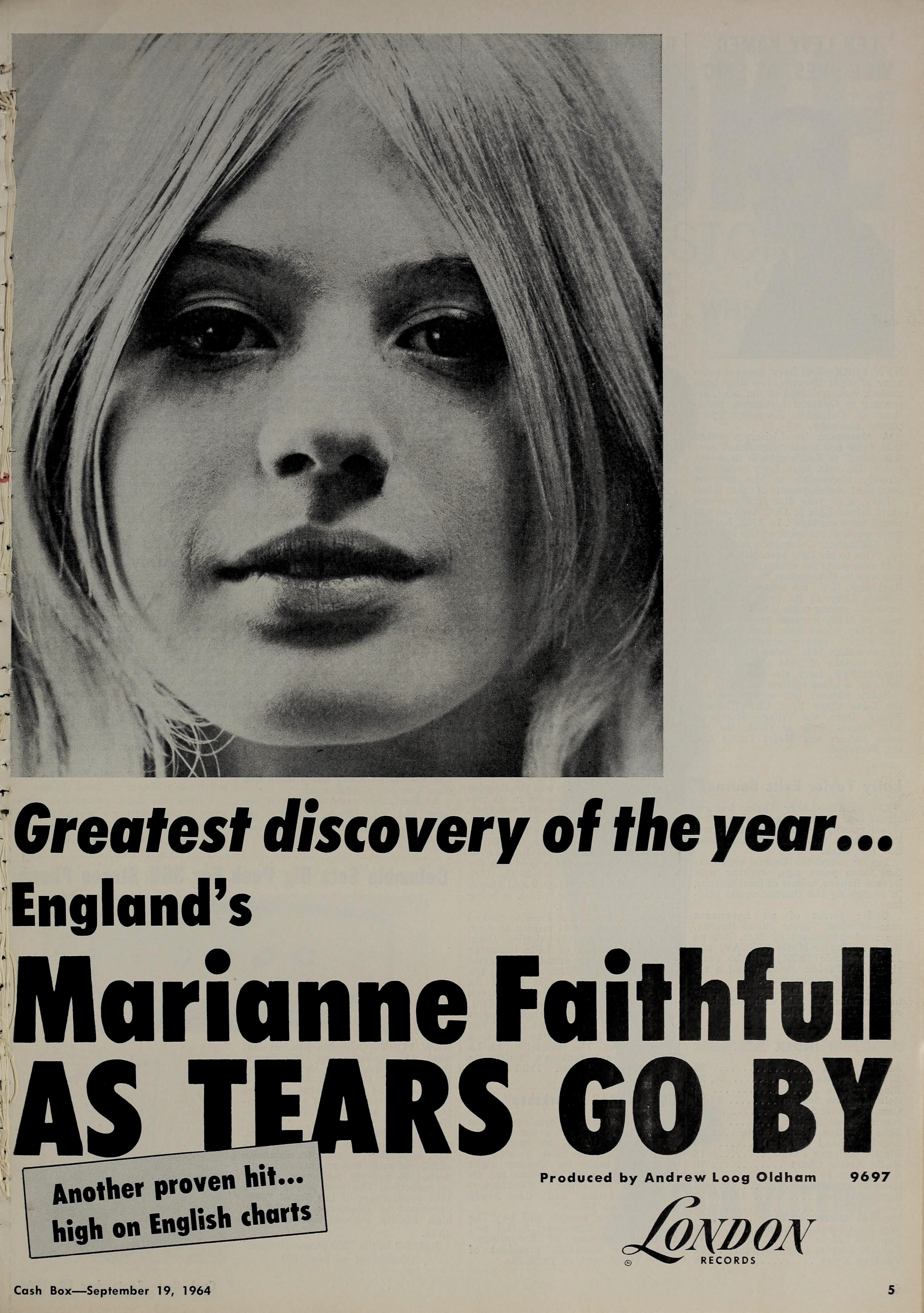
Cashbox advertisement, September 19, 1964

"As Tears Go By" was one of the early compositions by Jagger and Richards; previously the Rolling Stones had chiefly been performing American blues and rhythm and blues tunes. By one account, Rolling Stones manager Andrew Loog Oldham locked Jagger and Richards in a kitchen to force them to write a song together, even suggesting what type of song he wanted: "I want a song with brick walls all around it, high windows, and no sex." The result initially was named "As Time Goes By", the title of the song Dooley Wilson sings in the film Casablanca. Oldham replaced "Time" with "Tears". Richards said:

We thought, what a terrible piece of tripe. We came out and played it to Andrew [Oldham], and he said "It's a hit." We actually sold this stuff, and it actually made money. Mick and I were thinking, this is money for old rope!

According to Jagger biographer Philip Norman, the song was mainly created by Jagger, in co-operation with session guitarist Big Jim Sullivan, although Jagger claims he was responsible for the lyrics, while Richards wrote the melody. Oldham subsequently gave the ballad (a format for which the Stones were not yet known) to Faithfull, then 17, for her to record as a B-side. Oldham played a demonstration tape for her with Jagger singing and Big Jim Sullivan on acoustic guitar. "He handed me a scrawled lyric sheet, and I went back into the studio and did it. As soon as I heard the cor anglais playing the opening bars, I knew it was going to work. After a couple of takes, it was done. Andrew came and gave me a big hug. 'Congratulations darling. You've got yourself a number six,' he said."

The success of the recording caused Decca Records to switch the song to an A-side, where it became a popular single. The melody features a distinctive English horn line. It reached number nine in the UK Singles Chart and launched Faithfull's career as a major singer. The song entered the US Billboard Hot 100 the week ending 28 November 1964, where it stayed for nine weeks peaking at number 22. In Canada, it peaked at number two on the RPM chart. Faithfull performed the song on the US television show Hullabaloo, in the segment presented by Beatles manager Brian Epstein from London.

If the song was written especially for Faithfull or an out-take from the Stones' repertoire is unclear. "All that stuff about how Mick wrote it for me was awfully nice but untrue," she told Penthouse in 1980, writes Hodkinson. Ten years later, on the sleeve notes for the Blazing Away album, she referred to it as "the song that Mick Jagger and Keith Richard wrote for me". In her own autobiography, Faithfull (1994), written together with David Dalton, she says, "'As Tears Go By' was not, contrary to popular folklore, written for me, but it fitted me so perfectly it might as well have been". Originally, the A-side of her first record should have been a song written by Lionel Bart, "I Don't Know (How to Tell You)", but that song was "awful", she writes. "It was one of those showbiz songs that needed the proper register. My voice was just plain wrong! We did take after agonizing take ... but I could not simply do it. In desperation, Andrew got me to try the song that originally had been planned for the B-side, 'As Tears Go By'." Faithfull admits that she "was never that crazy about 'As Tears Go By'." "God knows how Mick and Keith wrote it or where it came from ... In any case, it is an absolutely astonishing thing for a boy of 20 to have written a song about a woman looking back nostalgically on her life."

Norwegian Newspaper Øvre Smaalenene describe Faithfull’s version as a “recording with a pleasant familiarity, without the melody itself standing out in any particular way”.

The Rolling Stones recorded their own version of "As Tears Go By" in 1965, changing the arrangement from Faithful's 1964 version; her 1964 version features percussion and strings throughout; the Rolling Stones' version completely lacks percussion and opens with acoustic guitar followed by strings entering in the second verse. The string arrangement on the Stones' version was done by Mike Leander.

Billboard described the Rolling Stones' version as a "beautiful folk-flavored ballad...baroque, semiclassical smash hit!" Cash Box said the Stones gave the song a "hauntingly, plaintive slow-moving laconic, classical-oriented style". The track was a surprise hit on the US Easy Listening chart.

"As Tears Go By" was one of the three songs, including "(I Can't Get No) Satisfaction" and "19th Nervous Breakdown", that the band performed live during their third appearance on The Ed Sullivan Show. It was released as a single in December 1965 by their North American record label, London Records. DJs across the country made "As Tears Go By" an in-demand hit when they started playing it from the band's recently released album December's Children (And Everybody's). It peaked at number six on the American Billboard Hot 100, echoing the success the Beatles had attained the same year with McCartney's plaintive ballad "Yesterday". The song was later released in the UK in 1966 as the B-side to the single, "19th Nervous Breakdown".

The Stones released a version with Italian lyrics as a single in Italy, under the title "Con Le Mie Lacrime" with the lyrics written by Danpa.

The song was performed live on tour for the first time in November 2005 on the Stones' A Bigger Bang Tour. A performance from the 2006 leg of the tour was captured for the 2008 concert film Shine a Light and the accompanying soundtrack album. On 11 July in Milan, the Stones performed it with the Italian lyrics. The song was performed as a duet between Jagger and Taylor Swift on 3 June 2013 at the United Center in Chicago, Illinois, for the band's 50 & Counting tour.

== Personnel ==
=== Marianne Faithfull version ===
According to musicologist Walter Everett, except where noted:

- Marianne Faithfull – vocals
- Jimmy Page – twelve-string acoustic guitar
- Unidentified musicians – backing vocals, tambourine, piano, bass, drums, oboe, violins
- Mike Leander – production, arrangement

=== Rolling Stones version ===
According to authors Philippe Margotin and Jean-Michel Guesdon, except where noted:

The Rolling Stones

- Mick Jagger – vocals
- Keith Richards – twelve-string acoustic guitar, arrangement

Additional musicians

- Mike Leander – arrangement and conducting
- Unidentified musicians – string quartet

== Charts ==
=== Marianne Faithfull version ===
1964–65 weekly chart performance
Chart (1964–65)	Peak position
Australia (Kent Music Report)	35
Canada Top Singles (RPM)	2
Ireland (IRMA)	9
UK Singles (Official Charts)	9
US Billboard Hot 100	22
US Cash Box Top 100	30

2025 weekly chart performance for "As Tears Go By"
Chart (2025)	Peak position
Israel International Airplay (Media Forest)	19
UK Single Sales (OCC)	18
UK Singles Downloads (OCC)	18

=== Rolling Stones version ===
1966 weekly chart performance
Chart (1966)	Peak position
Belgium (Ultratop 50 Wallonia)	16
Canada Top Singles (RPM)	1
Finland (Suomen virallinen lista)	5
New Zealand (Listener)	10
Rhodesia (Lyons Maid)	7
Sweden (Kvällstoppen)	5
U.S. Billboard Easy Listening	10
US Billboard Hot 100	6
US Cash Box Top 100	3

1966 year-end chart performance
Chart (1966)	Peak Rank
US Cash Box	100

== Cover versions ==
- Nancy Sinatra on her number 1 1966 Boots album.
- Esther Phillips on her album "Esther Phillips Sings" in 1966.
- The Primitives, from the 1994 compilation album Bombshell.
- Avenged Sevenfold released a version on the deluxe edition of their album The Stage in 2017.
- Billie Joe Armstrong of Green Day on his 2018 solo EP "Return To Sender" under The Longshot.
