= Jagger–Richards =

Songwriting, music production partnership

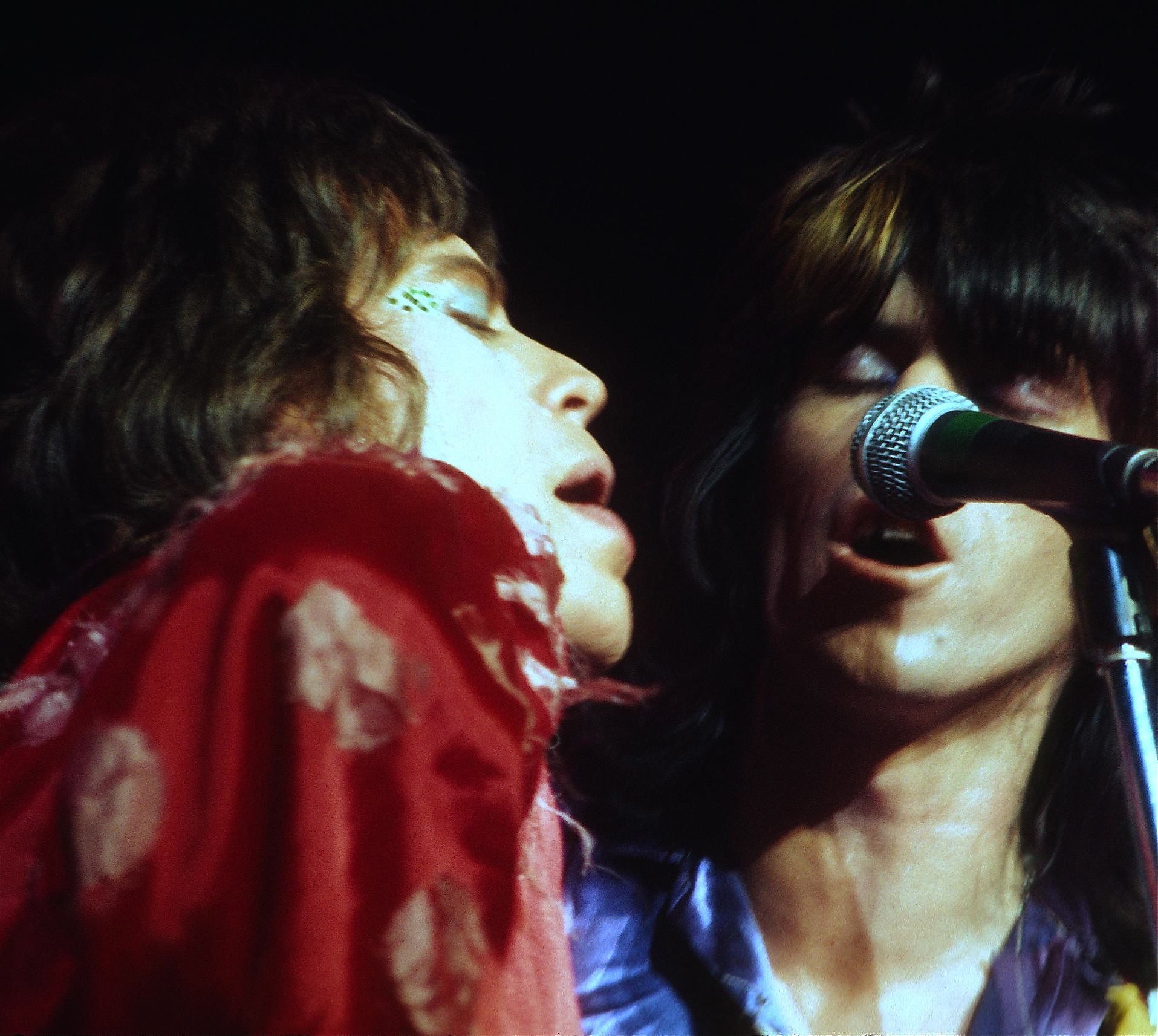
Jagger (left) and Richards (right) in June 1972 at Winterland in San Francisco

Jagger–Richards (spelled Jagger–Richard from 1963 to 1978) (Note: In mid-1963, Andrew Loog Oldham advised that Richards drop the s from his name. The change was not official and was assumed only as a stage name. In 1978, Richards switched back to using his legal name in all public and private contexts.) is the songwriting partnership between English musicians Mick Jagger and Keith Richards (both born 1943), founder members of rock band the Rolling Stones. They are one of the most successful songwriting partnerships in history. In addition to Jagger and Richards' songwriting partnership, they have also produced or co-produced numerous Rolling Stones albums under the pseudonym the Glimmer Twins.

Similar to the contemporary English songwriting partnership of John Lennon and Paul McCartney, both Jagger and Richards write lyrics and music.

== History ==
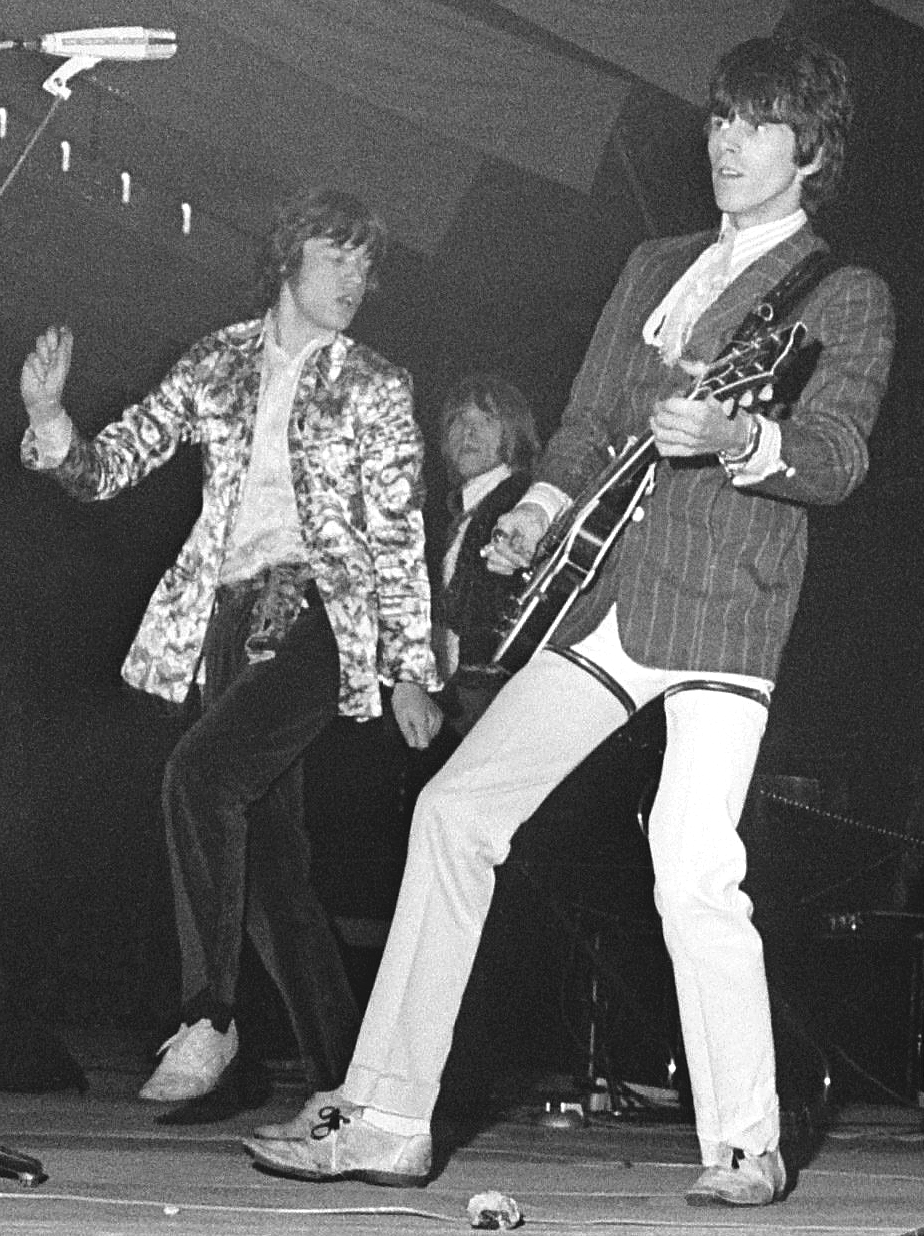
Jagger (left) and Richards (right) performing with Brian Jones (middle) and the Rolling Stones in 1967

Jagger and Richards have different recollections about their first songwriting endeavours but both credit manager Andrew Loog Oldham as the catalyst for their collaboration. Richards agrees that it was Oldham who pressed the pair to write songs after the duo had first emphasized other people's material; Oldham noted that there weren't that many obscure great songs out there for the band to cover. Richards recalled:

So what Andrew Oldham did was lock us up in the kitchen for a night and say, "Don't come out without a song." We sat around and came up with "As Tears Go By". It was unlike most Rolling Stones material, but that's what happens when you write songs, you immediately fly to some other realm. The weird thing is that Andrew found Marianne Faithfull at the same time, bunged it to her and it was a fuckin' hit for her – we were songwriters already! But it took the rest of that year to dare to write anything for the Stones.

Jagger remembered it differently:

Keith likes to tell the story about the kitchen, God bless him. I think Andrew may have said something at some point along the lines of "I should lock you in a room until you've written a song" and in that way he did mentally lock us in a room, but he didn't literally lock us in. One of the first songs we came out with was that tune for George Bean, the very memorable "It Should Be You".

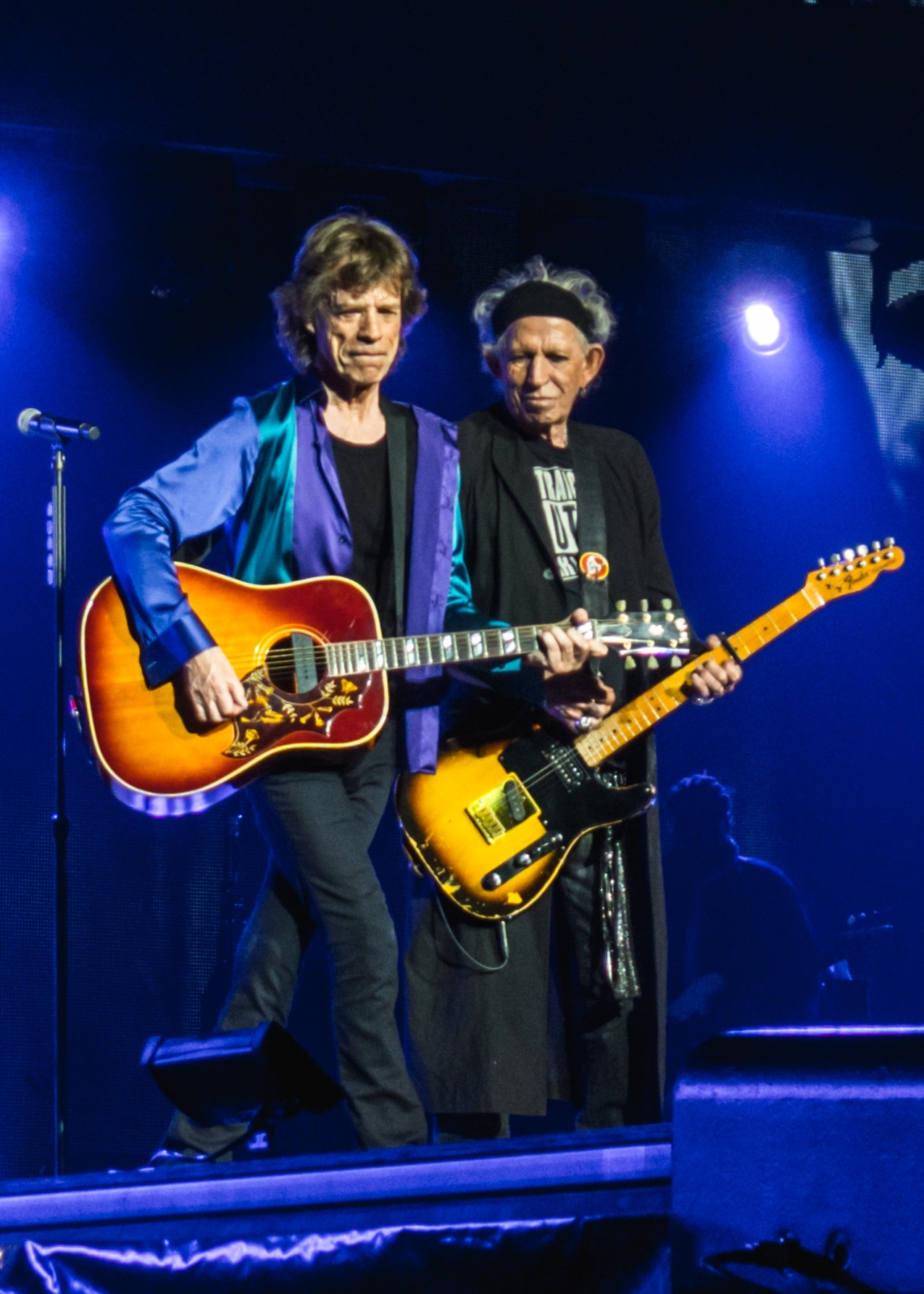
Jagger (left) and Richards (right) performing with the Rolling Stones in Stockholm, Sweden, during the No Filter Tour in 2017

According to John Lennon, he and Paul McCartney might have been instrumental in inspiring Jagger and Richards to start writing their own material. In 1963 Lennon and McCartney gave the Stones one of their compositions, "I Wanna Be Your Man." In a Playboy interview in 1980, Lennon recalled:

We were taken down to meet them at the club where they were playing in Richmond by Brian Epstein and some other guy. They wanted a song and we went to see what kind of stuff they did. Mick and Keith heard we had an unfinished song – Paul just had this bit and we needed another verse or something. We sort of played it roughly to them and they said, "Yeah, OK, that's our style." But it was only really a lick, so Paul and I went off in the corner of the room and finished the song off while they were all still sitting there talking. We came back, and that's how Mick and Keith got inspired to write ... because, "Jesus, look at that. They just went in the corner and wrote it and came back!" You know, right in front of their eyes we did it. So we gave it to them.

The first original Jagger/Richards song to be released as the A-side of a Rolling Stones single was "Tell Me (You're Coming Back)", from their debut album. Released as a single in the US only, it peaked at number 24 on the charts there. The earlier "Good Times, Bad Times" had been released as the B-side to their cover of Bobby and Shirley Womack's "It's All Over Now". The band's first UK single featuring an A-side Jagger/Richards original was "The Last Time"; released in February 1965, it went to number one in the UK and number nine in the US.

Although most Jagger/Richards compositions have been collaborations, some of the songs credited to the partnership have been solo songwriting from either Jagger, whose examples include "Sympathy for the Devil" and "Brown Sugar", or Richards, whose examples include "Happy", "Ruby Tuesday", and "Little T&A". This is comparable to the Lennon–McCartney partnership, who also adhered to a tradition of joint credits even on numbers that were written by just one of the pair. Mick Jagger stated in his comprehensive 1995 interview with Jann Wenner of Rolling Stone magazine "I think in the end it all balances out."

On 26 June 2013, the duo signed a publishing agreement with BMG.

== Co-credits ==
Jagger and Richards have shared credits with very few others. Among them are:

Songs co-written by Jagger–Richards and outside songwriters
Co-Writer	Song	Notes
Andrew Loog Oldham	"As Tears Go By"	
Marianne Faithfull	"Sister Morphine"	
Mick Taylor	"Ventilator Blues", "Criss Cross"	Stones guitarist from 1969 to 1974. Taylor has stated that he left the Rolling Stones partly because he was not given co-writing credits on material for which he felt he should have received credit.
Ronnie Wood	"Dance (Pt. 1)", "If I Was a Dancer (Dance Pt. 2)", "Everything Is Turning to Gold", "Black Limousine", "No Use in Crying", "Pretty Beat Up", "One Hit (To the Body)", "Fight", "Dirty Work", "Had It with You" and "When You're Gone"	Rolling Stones guitarist since 1976. He is credited as "Inspiration by Ronnie Wood" on "It's Only Rock 'n Roll (But I Like It)" and "Hey Negrita"
Billy Preston	"Melody"	Preston is credited as "inspiration by Billy Preston"
Chuck Leavell	"Back to Zero"	Leavell has performed as a keyboardist with the Rolling Stones since 1982
Steve Jordan	"Almost Hear You Sigh", "One More Shot"	Jordan, a popular drummer and producer, has appeared with the Rolling Stones solo projects, perhaps most visible as a member of the John Mayer Trio or that of Keith Richards and the X-pensive Winos. He later drummed with the Rolling Stones, following the death of Charlie Watts.
k.d. lang and Ben Mink	"Anybody Seen My Baby?"	Lang and Mink were not involved with the composition of "Anybody Seen My Baby?"; they were given co-writing credits when, prior to the song's release, one of Keith Richards' daughters pointed out a similarity to "Constant Craving", a hit from Lang's 1992 Ingénue album.
Pierre de Beauport	"Thief in the Night"	Richards' guitar technician, and also a recording engineer who co-mixed that song.
Andrew Watt	"Angry", "Get Close", "Depending On You", "Side Effects", "Back in Your Life", "Bad Luck Hideaway"	Co-producer of Hackney Diamonds and Foreign Tongues
Matt Clifford	"Never Wanna Lose You", "Covered in You"	Keyboardist who's been associated with The Rolling Stones since 1989.

== Jagger–Richards compositions released only by other artists ==
Jagger–Richards compositions that have been released only by artists other than the Rolling Stones include:

- "That Girl Belongs to Yesterday", a January 1964 single by Gene Pitney
- "Will You Be My Lover Tonight"/"It Should Be You", a January 1964 single by George Bean
- "Each and Every Day", B-side of the February 1964 single "All I Want Is My Baby" by Bobby Jameson (London 45–9730). The A-side was co-written by Richards and Andrew Loog Oldham.
- "Shang a Doo Lang", a March 1964 single by Adrienne Posta
- "So Much in Love", an August 1964 single by the Mighty Avengers, also recorded by the Herd (with Peter Frampton and Louis Cennamo) in 1966 and the Lonely Boys for their self-titled 1996 album.
- "Act Together", on Ronnie Wood's September 1974 LP I've Got My Own Album to Do and the associated July 1974 The First Barbarians: Live from Kilburn concert (released in October 2007)
- "Sure the One You Need", on Wood's I've Got My Own Album to Do and The First Barbarians: Live from Kilburn; and on the New Barbarians' May 1979 concert album Buried Alive: Live in Maryland (released in October 2006).
- "Lonely at the Top", on Mick Jagger's February 1985 LP She's the Boss.

== Production as the Glimmer Twins and origin of the name ==
Jagger and Richards adopted the nickname "The Glimmer Twins" after a vacation cruise they took to Brazil in December 1968 – January 1969 with their then-girlfriends, Marianne Faithfull and Anita Pallenberg. An older English couple on the ship kept asking Richards and Jagger who they were. When they refused to reveal their identities, the woman reportedly kept asking, "just give us a glimmer" (as in "give us a hint about who you are"), which amused Jagger and Richards.

Jagger and Richards began to produce the Stones' albums under the pseudonym "The Glimmer Twins" starting with It's Only Rock 'n' Roll (released in 1974). The Glimmer Twins were the sole credited producers for the band's studio and live albums from then, up to and including Still Life (released in 1982). Starting with Undercover (released in 1983), the Glimmer Twins have shared production credit for the Rolling Stones albums with other producers, most frequently Don Was (five times) and Chris Kimsey (three times).

Besides their production work for the Rolling Stones, Jagger and Richards also used the Glimmer Twins for their co-production credit on Peter Tosh's album Bush Doctor, released in 1978. A rare exception to Jagger and Richards' use of the Glimmer Twins name for production credits appeared on John Phillips's Pay Pack & Follow album, recorded 1973–1979 and released in 2001, for which Jagger and Richards were credited as producers under their own names.

== Legacy ==
The partnership of Jagger and Richards has been described by Rolling Stone as the sixth greatest songwriter of all time. Rolling Stone considers the duo to have "defined a rock song's essential components...and established a blueprint for future rockers to follow."

== See also ==
- The Rolling Stones discography
- List of songs recorded by the Rolling Stones
- Nanker/Phelge
- Lennon–McCartney
- Toxic Twins
