= Sway (Rolling Stones song) =

1971 Rolling Stones song

Song by the Rolling Stones

from the album Sticky Fingers
- Released: 23 April 1971
- Recorded: October 1970
- Genre: Blues rock
- Length: 3:51
- Label: Rolling Stones; Virgin
- Songwriters: Mick Jagger; Keith Richards
- Producer: Jimmy Miller

"Sway" is a song by the English rock band the Rolling Stones from their 1971 album Sticky Fingers. It was also released as the B-side of the "Wild Horses" single in June 1971. This single was released in the US only. Initial pressings of the single contain an alternate take; later pressings include the album version instead.

== Background ==
Credited to Mick Jagger and Keith Richards, "Sway" is a slower blues song and was the first song recorded by the band at Stargroves.

Ain't flinging tears out on the dusty ground for my friends out on the burial ground.
Can't stand the feeling getting so brought down.
It's just that demon life has got me in its sway.

The song features a bottleneck slide guitar solo during the bridge and a dramatic, virtuoso outro solo (both performed by Mick Taylor). The rhythm guitar performed by Jagger was his first electric guitar performance on an album. The strings on the piece were arranged by Paul Buckmaster, who also worked on "Moonlight Mile", another song from Sticky Fingers. Richards added his backing vocals but provided no guitar to the track. Pete Townshend, Billy Nichols and Ronnie Lane are believed to contribute backing vocals as well.

Taylor would later claim that he felt he deserved writing credits on "Sway" and a few other songs, and the fact that he did not receive them was one of the causes of his departure from the band.

== Live ==
It was performed live for the first time in Columbus, Ohio, and then at many of the shows on the band's A Bigger Bang Tour in 2006.

A seven-minute version of "Sway" appears on the Carla Olson/Mick Taylor Live at the Roxy album (also known as Too Hot for Snakes). Taylor gets to stretch out and solo whereas the Stones version faded at just under four minutes. Ian McLagan plays piano on this version.

During the Stones' "50 & Counting" concert tour in 2013, the band, accompanied by their guest Mick Taylor, played "Sway" during concerts at Los Angeles, Chicago and Boston. These concerts marked the first time that Taylor played on "Sway" at a Stones concert. During this performance, Ronnie Wood played the slide guitar solo while Taylor played the guitar solo that closes the song.

== Personnel ==
The Rolling Stones

- Mick Jagger – vocals, rhythm guitar
- Keith Richards – backing vocals
- Mick Taylor – lead guitar, slide guitar
- Bill Wyman – bass guitar
- Charlie Watts – drums

Additional personnel

- Nicky Hopkins – piano
- Paul Buckmaster – string arrangement

== In popular culture ==
The song was featured in The Sopranos prequel, The Many Saints of Newark, released in 2021. A young Tony and Artie get off the bus and enter Holsten's Diner while the song plays in the background.

== Cover versions ==
The song was covered by the band Overwhelming Colorfast on their 1995 Bender EP, then later appeared on the 1996 label comp, Super Mixer: A Goldenrod Compilation.

It was also covered by Alvin Youngblood Hart on the October 1997 River North Records release, Paint It Blue: Songs Of The Rolling Stones. Albert Castiglia covered the track on his 2014 album, Solid Ground.

Carla Olson and Mick Taylor recorded a live version for their album Live: Too Hot for Snakes.

Jason Isbell & the 400 Unit covered the song for their EP Live From Welcome To 1979.

Melvins covered the song for their EP Five Legged Dog.

Alejandro Escovedo covered the song on his 1998 live album More Miles Than Money: Live 1994–96.

Patti Rothberg covered the song on her 2008 album Double Standards. This version was produced by Freddie Katz. Patti Rothberg played the guitar solo in the bridge and Freddie Katz provided the extended solo in the outro.

On her 2025 collaborative album Duets Special, Chrissie Hynde covered the song with Lucinda Williams.
