= Bitch (Rolling Stones song) =

Song by The Rolling Stones

Single by The Rolling Stones

from the album Sticky Fingers
- A-side: "Brown Sugar"
- Released: 16 April 1971
- Recorded: October 1970
- Genre: Hard rock
- Length: 3:36
- Label: Rolling Stones
- Songwriter: Jagger–Richards
- Producer: Jimmy Miller

"Bitch" is a song recorded by the English rock band the Rolling Stones. Written by Mick Jagger and Keith Richards, "Bitch" is a "hard-bitten rocker" featuring Jagger on vocals and a powerful horn line. It was released as the B-side to the advance single, "Brown Sugar", from their ninth British and eleventh American studio album, Sticky Fingers. It was originally released one week before the album. Despite not being used as an official single by itself, the tune has garnered major airplay from AOR radio stations. The song was recorded in October 1970 at London's Olympic Studios, and at Stargroves using the Rolling Stones Mobile Studio.

== Music and lyrics ==
"Bitch" was written by Jagger–Richards and recorded over many takes at London's Olympic Studios and at Stargroves using the Rolling Stones Mobile studio. Musically, "Bitch" is a hard rock song that incorporates a "pulse quickening" horn arrangement.

== Composition ==
"Bitch" was conceived during the Sticky Fingers sessions in October 1970. Richards was late that day, but when he arrived he transformed a loose jam into the trademark riff found on the released take. Andy Johns claimed:

When we were doing "Bitch", Keith was very late. Jagger and Mick Taylor had been playing the song without him and it didn't sound very good. I walked out of the kitchen and he was sitting on the floor with no shoes, eating a bowl of cereal. Suddenly he said, Oi, Andy! Give me that guitar. I handed him his clear Dan Armstrong Plexiglass guitar, he put it on, kicked the song up in tempo, and just put the vibe right on it. Instantly, it went from being this laconic mess into a real groove. And I thought, Wow. THAT'S what he does.

The song has a heavy brass section that punctuates the guitar riff after the choruses. Jagger said:

The brass for me is great, especially on like "Bitch". I mean as long as it's used sort of tastefully. I'm not saying I'd like to work with a band with sort of five or six brass. But I wouldn't mind a band with sort of 5 saxophones.

== Critical reception ==
"Bitch" was referred to as a "hard-bitten rocker" by the BBC in its 2007 retrospective review. Rolling Stone ranked the song as the seventy-sixth best song for the band. Comparing it to other seventies songs with similar titles, Rolling Stone stated that "none bitched harder or louder than this one". Cash Box described it as "a classic rough and ready bash about."

== Personnel ==
According to the album's liner notes.

The Rolling Stones

- Mick Jagger – vocals
- Keith Richards – electric guitar, backing vocals
- Mick Taylor – electric guitar
- Bill Wyman – bass guitar
- Charlie Watts – drums

Additional musicians

- Bobby Keys – tenor saxophone
- Jim Price – trumpet
- Jimmy Miller – percussion

Technical personnel

- Jimmy Miller – producer
- Glyn Johns – engineer
- Andy Johns – engineer

== Other releases ==
- Made in the Shade (1975)
- Time Waits for No One: Anthology 1971–1977 (1979)
- Jump Back: The Best of The Rolling Stones (1993)
- Singles 1971–2006 (2011)
- GRRR! (2012)
- Honk (2019)
