= Time Waits for No One: Anthology 1971–1977 =

Music album by The Rolling Stones

Compilation album by The Rolling Stones
- Released: 1 June 1979
- Recorded: 1970–1976
- Genre: Rock
- Length: 46:13
- Label: Rolling Stones
- Producer: Jimmy Miller, The Glimmer Twins

The Rolling Stones chronology
Some Girls (1978)	Time Waits for No One: Anthology 1971–1977 (1979)	Emotional Rescue (1980)

Time Waits for No One: Anthology 1971–1977 is a compilation album by the Rolling Stones released in 1979 (released worldwide except for the US). It covers the period from Sticky Fingers in 1971 until Love You Live in 1977. Only two of ten single A-sides from the period are included—"Angie" and "Fool to Cry". It was released for the first time on CD in May 2019 in Japan, making use of the standard version of the title track and the censored version of "Star Star".

== Track listing ==
All songs by Mick Jagger and Keith Richards

Side one

1. "Time Waits for No One" – 6:39
  - From It's Only Rock 'n' Roll
2. "Bitch" – 3:37
  - From Sticky Fingers
3. "All Down the Line" – 3:48
  - From Exile on Main St.
4. "Dancing with Mr. D" – 4:52
  - From Goats Head Soup
5. "Angie" – 4:33
  - From Goats Head Soup

Side two

1. "Star Star" – 4:26
  - From Goats Head Soup
2. "If You Can't Rock Me"/"Get Off Of My Cloud" – 4:56
  - From Love You Live
3. "Hand of Fate" – 4:28
  - From Black and Blue
4. "Crazy Mama" – 4:34
  - From Black and Blue
5. "Fool to Cry" – 5:04
  - From Black and Blue
