= Mick Taylor (album) =

Studio album by Mick Taylor
- Released: June 22, 1979
- Recorded: 1976–1979
- Studio: Island, London; Ramport, London; Rolling Stones Mobile Studio, Ridge Farm, Surrey; Sawmills, Cornwall
- Genre: Blues rock
- Length: 43:20
- Label: CBS (Columbia)
- Producer: Mick Taylor

Mick Taylor chronology
Mick Taylor (1979)	Stranger in this Town (1990)

Professional ratings
Review scores
Source	Rating
Allmusic	link

Mick Taylor is the debut studio album by the former Rolling Stones guitarist Mick Taylor, released in 1979. Though the album was acclaimed by critics, it was a commercial disappointment, peaking at #119 across a five week stretch on the Billboard Hot 200. The album's pleasant blues-based style was generally much softer than his work with the Rolling Stones. The album's polished blues- and jazz-based sound was arguably at odds with the mood of the moment of its release when punk and new wave were on the ascendancy, although fans were still buying the recordings of similar artists such as Dire Straits, Eric Clapton, Fleetwood Mac and the Rolling Stones themselves.

The opening track "Leather Jacket" was a song which originated during Taylor's days with the Rolling Stones. An instrumental track without vocals was recorded by the full band in June 1970 during the Sticky Fingers sessions, and has appeared on many bootleg records.

== Track listing ==
All songs written by Mick Taylor, except "Alabama", with lyrics written by Colin Allen.

Side one

1. "Leather Jacket" – 3:42
2. "Alabama" – 3:49
3. "Slow Blues" – 3:25
4. "Baby I Want You" – 5:17
5. "Broken Hands" – 4:00

Side two

1. "Giddy-Up" – 5:18
2. "S.W.5" – 5:37
3. "Spanish / A Minor" – 12:12

== Personnel ==
- Mick Taylor – guitar and vocals (all tracks), piano (4, 7, 8a), bass guitar (4, 5, 7, 8b), electric piano (8b), synthesizer (8b), strings (7, 8a)
- Lowell George – slide guitar (6)
- Kuma Harada – bass guitar (1, 3, 8a), strings and double bass [bowed bass] (8b)
- Alan Spenner – bass guitar (6)
- Jean Roussel – piano (1, 3, 6, 8b)
- Pierre Moerlen – drums (1, 3, 8a)
- Mike Driscoll – drums (4, 5, 7, 8b), bass drum (2)
- Richard Bailey – drums (6)
- Norman Mighell – tambourine (1)

Technical

- Benny King, Genaro Rippo, Guy Bidmead, Jerry Boys, John Burns, Norman Tighell, Paul Northfield, Phil Ault, Simon Fraser, Will Reid-Dick – engineer
- Hipgnosis – cover design, photography
