= Metamorphosis (Rolling Stones album) =

Compilation album by the Rolling Stones
- Released: May 1975
- Recorded: February 1964 – July 1970
- Genre: Rock
- Length: 48:03
- Label: ABKCO
- Producers: Andrew Loog Oldham; Jimmy Miller

The Rolling Stones chronology
Made in the Shade (1975)	Metamorphosis (1975)	Rolled Gold: The Very Best of the Rolling Stones (1975)

Professional ratings
Review scores
Source	Rating
AllMusic	3/5 stars
Christgau's Record Guide	B+
Entertainment Weekly	B
Rolling Stone	no rating
The Village Voice	B+

Metamorphosis is the third compilation album of the Rolling Stones music released by former manager Allen Klein's ABKCO Records (who gained control of the band's Decca/London material in 1970) after the band's departure from Decca and Klein. Released in 1975, Metamorphosis centres on outtakes and alternate versions of well-known songs recorded from 1964 to 1970.

== History ==
After the release of Hot Rocks 1964–1971 in 1971, an album titled Necrophilia was compiled with the aid of Andrew Loog Oldham for release as a follow-up compilation, featuring many previously unreleased (or, more accurately, discarded) outtakes from the Rolling Stones' Decca/London period. While that project failed to materialise—with More Hot Rocks (Big Hits & Fazed Cookies) being released in its place—most of the unreleased songs were held over for a future project.

In February 1974, to give it an air of authority, Bill Wyman involved himself in compiling an album he entitled Black Box. However, Allen Klein wanted more Mick Jagger/Keith Richards songs in the project for monetary reasons, and Wyman's version remained unreleased. Metamorphosis was issued in its place.

Wyman's original picks for the record were as follows:

- "Bright Lights Big City"
- "Cops and Robbers"
- "I'd Much Rather Be With the Boys"
- "Little Red Rooster" (Live)
- "Down the Road Apiece" (Live)
- "Don't Lie to Me"
- "If You Let Me"
- "Godzi"
- "Panama Powder Room"
- "Gold Painted Nails"
- "Fannie Mae"
- "Down in the Bottom"

"Godzi" and "Panama Powder Room" were instrumentals from the Between the Buttons sessions and have never been released. They were recorded at RCA Studios, Hollywood on 4–12 August 1966.

Most tracks that appear on side one of the album are demos, written by Jagger and Richards for other artists to perform. Some were recorded with session musicians like Big Jim Sullivan on guitar, Clem Cattini on drums, and Jimmy Page on guitar, and were not intended for release by the Rolling Stones. Indeed, on most of these tracks the only Rolling Stone who appears is Jagger. "Out of Time" and "Heart of Stone" were well-known Stones songs that appear here in drastically different renditions, with session players providing the backing. Side two includes unreleased band recordings up until the Sticky Fingers sessions of 1970.

With some speculation that "I'd Much Rather Be With the Boys" had a homosexual subtext, the Toggery Five version changed the lyric to "I'd rather be out with the boys." An alternate version of "Memo from Turner" includes Brian Jones on guitar and has a looser vibe than the Mick Jagger solo single from the soundtrack album of the 1970 film Performance.

Released in May 1975, Metamorphosis came out the same day as the band's authorised hits collection Made in the Shade and was also seen to be cashing in on the Rolling Stones' summer Tour of the Americas. While the critical reception was lukewarm, Metamorphosis still managed to reach No. 8 in the US, though it only made No. 45 in the UK. Two singles, "Out of Time" (featuring Jagger singing over the same backing track (with strings) used for Chris Farlowe's 1966 version) and a cover of Stevie Wonder's "I Don't Know Why" briefly made the singles charts.

Upon its initial release, Metamorphosis was released with 16 songs in the UK, while the American edition had only 14 – omitting "Some Things Just Stick in Your Mind" and "We're Wastin' Time".

The album's cover art plays off the title with a human/insect motif alluding to Franz Kafka's The Metamorphosis, and includes images of both Brian Jones and his replacement Mick Taylor.

In August 2002, the full UK edition of Metamorphosis was issued in a new remastered CD, vinyl, and SACD digipak by ABKCO Records.

== Track listing ==
All songs by Mick Jagger and Keith Richards, except where noted.

Side one

1. "Out of Time" – 3:22
2. "Don't Lie to Me" (Hudson Whittaker) – 2:00
3. "Some Things Just Stick in Your Mind" – 2:25
4. "Each and Everyday of the Year" – 2:48
5. "Heart of Stone" – 3:47
6. "I'd Much Rather Be with the Boys" (Andrew Loog Oldham, Keith Richards) – 2:11
7. "(Walkin' Thru The) Sleepy City" – 2:51
8. "We're Wastin' Time" – 2:42
9. "Try a Little Harder" – 2:17

Side two

10. "I Don't Know Why" (Stevie Wonder, Paul Riser, Don Hunter, Lula Hardaway) – 3:01
11. "If You Let Me" – 3:17
12. "Jiving Sister Fanny" – 2:45
13. "Downtown Suzie" (Bill Wyman) – 3:52
14. "Family" – 4:05
15. "Memo from Turner" – 2:45
16. "I'm Going Down" – 2:52

=== Recording details ===
"Out of Time" – 3:22

- Recorded 27–30 April 1966
- The demo—with Jagger on lead vocal—for Chris Farlowe's hit single version

"Don't Lie to Me" – 2:00

- Recorded on 10 June 1964
- Incorrectly credited to Jagger and Richards on the album
- Line up: Mick Jagger (vocals), Keith Richards (guitar), Brian Jones (guitar), Charlie Watts (drums), Bill Wyman (bass), Ian Stewart (piano)

"Some Things Just Stick in Your Mind" – 2:25

- Recorded on 13 February 1964
- The first version of this song to be released (in early 1965) was by the American duo Dick and Dee Dee (who dubbed their vocals onto the original Rolling Stones demo backing track), followed closely by the Vashti Bunyan recording.

"Each and Everyday of the Year" – 2:48

- Recorded in early September 1964
- Bobby Jameson's version of this song features the same backing track as this recording. It was also covered by a group that went by the name of Thee, both in 1965

"Heart of Stone" – 3:47

- Demo recorded 21–23 July 1964 with Jimmy Page on guitar and Clem Cattini on drums

"I'd Much Rather Be With the Boys" – 2:11

- Recorded 24–28 February 1965 at Decca Studios, West Hampstead
- Originally released by The Toggery 5 in 1965.
- Guest musicians: John McLaughlin (guitar), Joe Moretti (bass) and Andy White (drums).

"(Walkin' Thru The) Sleepy City" – 2:51

- Recorded in early September 1964
- Originally released by The Mighty Avengers in 1965

"We're Wastin' Time" – 2:42

- Recorded in early September 1964
- Originally released by Jimmy Tarbuck in 1965

"Try a Little Harder" – 2:17

- Recorded on 13 February 1964

"I Don't Know Why" – 3:01

- Recorded on 3 July 1969 (the night that news broke of Brian Jones's death) during the sessions for Let It Bleed
- The music after the stop was spliced in at a later stage. The second slide guitar solo by Mick Taylor is a copy of the first solo
- Incorrectly credited to Jagger, Richards and Taylor on the first pressing of the album. The credits were corrected with the second pressing and on the 2002 SACD version

"If You Let Me" – 3:17

- Recorded on 9-29 November 1966 during sessions for Between the Buttons
- Line up: Mick Jagger (vocals), Keith Richards (acoustic guitar), Brian Jones (autoharp), Charlie Watts (drums), Bill Wyman (bass), Ian Stewart (organ)

"Jiving Sister Fanny" – 2:45

- Recorded in June 1969, during the Let It Bleed sessions, with Taylor on lead guitar
- Line up: Mick Jagger (vocals), Keith Richards (guitar), Mick Taylor (guitar), Charlie Watts (drums), Bill Wyman (bass), Nicky Hopkins (piano), Jon Tiven (congas)

"Downtown Suzie" – 3:52

- Recorded on 23 April 1969 as a Let It Bleed outtake under the original title "Lisle Street Lucie". It features Ry Cooder on open G tuned guitar. Song written by Bill Wyman.

"Family" – 4:05

- Recorded on 28 June 1968 as a Beggars Banquet outtake.
- Line up: Mick Jagger (vocals), Keith Richards (guitars), Charlie Watts (drums), Bill Wyman (bass), Nicky Hopkins (piano), Jimmy Miller (percussion)

"Memo from Turner" – 2:45

- Recorded on 17 November 1968; a different take was released as a Mick Jagger solo single in October 1970 and featured in the film Performance.
- Featuring Jagger on vocals and Keith Richards on guitar, the identity of the other musicians on this track is not certain, with Jim Capaldi and Steve Winwood of Traffic, as well as the other Rolling Stones, being mentioned as playing on it

"I'm Going Down" – 2:52

- Recorded primarily in the fall of 1969.
- Line up: Mick Jagger (vocals), Keith Richards (guitar), Mick Taylor (bass), Charlie Watts (drums), Bobby Keys (saxophone), Jon Tiven (congas)
- Stephen Stills was with the Stones during recording and possibly contributed to the track.
- Credited to Jagger, Richards and Taylor on the first pressing of the album. The credits were changed to 'Jagger/Richards' with the second pressing and on the 2002 SACD version

== Charts ==
1975 weekly chart performance for Metamorphosis
Chart (1975)	Peak position
Australian Albums (Kent Music Report)	51
Canada Top Albums/CDs (RPM)	38
Swedish Albums (Kvällstoppen)	11
UK Albums (Official Charts)	45
US Billboard 200	8

2020 weekly chart performance for Metamorphosis
Chart (2020)	Peak position
Austrian Albums (Ö3 Austria)	8
US Top Rock Albums (Billboard)	40
