= Time Waits for No One (Rolling Stones song) =

Song by the Rolling Stones

from the album It's Only Rock 'n Roll
- Released: 18 October 1974
- Recorded: November 1973; January, April–May 1974
- Genre: Soft rock; jazz rock
- Length: 6:38
- Label: Rolling Stones/Virgin
- Songwriter: Jagger/Richards
- Producer: The Glimmer Twins

"Time Waits for No One" is a song by the English rock band the Rolling Stones from the 1974 album It's Only Rock 'n Roll. It was the first song recorded for the album.

Credited to Mick Jagger and Keith Richards, "Time Waits for No One" is a slow-tempo, almost hypnotic song dissimilar to the ones for which the Stones are best known. The track features a distinctive groove that has been compared to the later song "Waiting on a Friend", which was initially recorded in late 1972. However, it seems like the song's unique musical inspiration seems to come more from their 1971 song Moonlight Mile and their 1973 track "Can You Hear The Music". It is also noted for its distinct Latin influences. The song begins with a riff played by Richards, repeated throughout the song. Drummer Charlie Watts and Bill Wyman incorporated jazz beats throughout this performance. Song contributor Ray Cooper provides the distinctive driving percussion for the song, including tambourine, maracas and a knocking beat that carries through the entire song like the sound of a ticking clock. Taylor also contributes an early use of synthesizer on a Stones track. Stones recording veteran Nicky Hopkins provides the song's swirling piano runs.

The most notable aspects of the song are the extended guitar solo played by Mick Taylor and the haunting lyrics by Mick Jagger. Taylor credits the inspiration for the solo to a visit to Brazil, which followed the Stones' European Tour 1973. Taylor's solo piece echoes beautifully throughout the entire song. It's worth noting that Taylor's solo in the song is reminiscent of solos in Carlos Santana's "Song of the Wind" from his 1972 album Caravanserai.

Jagger's lyrics are a pastiche of complex observations and reflections. He speaks in the voice of a person seeking the true meaning of life, that, as the title suggests, time waits for no one:

Yes, star crossed in pleasure the stream flows on by
Yes, as we're sated in leisure, we watch it fly ...
Drink in your summer, gather your corn
The dreams of the night time will vanish by dawn

AllMusic critic Stephen Thomas Erlewine described "Time Waits for No One" as having "aching beauty". The song, though well regarded among the Stones' canon of work, has never been performed live and has appeared on only two compilation albums. The track appeared on the British compilation album Time Waits for No One: Anthology 1971–1977, issued in 1979. This album was available on vinyl only (CDC59107) and has never been released on CD. Subsequently, the track was included on the 1981 album Sucking in the Seventies but it was a truncated version of the original. Taylor's solo was faded out early, making it about two minutes shorter than the original.

The science-fiction thriller Time After Time features the song during the chorus while Malcolm McDowell is time-traveling as H. G. Wells.
