= Sucking in the Seventies =

Compilation album by The Rolling Stones
- Released: March 1981
- Recorded: November 1973 – December 1979
- Genre: Rock
- Length: 42:22
- Label: Rolling Stones/Virgin (2005 reissue)
- Producer: The Glimmer Twins

The Rolling Stones chronology
Emotional Rescue (1980)	Sucking in the Seventies (1981)	Tattoo You (1981)

Sucking in the Seventies is the fifth official compilation album by the Rolling Stones, released in 1981. Serving as the successor to 1975's Made in the Shade, it covers material from the recording sessions of It's Only Rock 'n Roll (1974), Black and Blue (1976), Some Girls (1978) and Emotional Rescue (1980). Deviating from the standard practice of "greatest hits" albums, it features a mix of hit songs, remixes, alternate takes of album tracks, B-sides, and live recordings.

== Contents ==
All tracks on Sucking in the Seventies, except "Shattered" and "Everything Is Turning to Gold" were mixed or edited specifically for this release. The album includes an otherwise unreleased live version of "When the Whip Comes Down", which was recorded during the band's 1978 tour in Detroit.

"If I Was a Dancer (Dance Pt. 2)" is a longer and different mix, containing different lyrics from "Dance (Pt. 1)", which is the opening track on Emotional Rescue (1980). The compilation album does not include "Miss You", which was The Rolling Stones' only number-one hit during this period.

== Release and reception ==
Professional ratings
Review scores
Source	Rating
AllMusic	3.5/5 stars
Christgau's Record Guide: The '80s	C+
Tom Hull – on the Web	B+

Released in the spring of 1981, as Tattoo You was nearing its completion, Sucking in the Seventies reached No. 15 in the US, going gold, but failed to chart in the UK.

Stephen Thomas Erlewine of AllMusic writes:

The amazing thing is that Sucking in the Seventies captures the garish decadence and ennui of the band better than the proper albums from this period. Not that this is a better record than Some Girls, but it is better than either Black and Blue or Emotional Rescue.

In 2005, the album was remastered and reissued by Virgin Records.

== Track listing ==
All songs by Mick Jagger and Keith Richards, except where noted.

Side one

1. "Shattered" – 3:46
  - From Some Girls (1978)
2. "Everything Is Turning to Gold" (Jagger, Richards, Ronnie Wood) – 4:06
  - B-side to "Shattered"
3. "Hot Stuff" – 3:30
  - Edited version from Black and Blue (1976)
4. "Time Waits for No One" – 4:25
  - Edited version from It's Only Rock 'n' Roll (1974)
5. "Fool to Cry" – 4:07
  - Edited version from Black and Blue (1976)

Side two

1. "Mannish Boy" (Ellas McDaniel, Mel London, McKinley Morganfield) – 4:38
  - Edited version from Love You Live (1977)
2. "When the Whip Comes Down" (Live version) – 4:35
  - Recorded live in Detroit on 6 July 1978
3. "If I Was a Dancer (Dance Pt. 2)" (Jagger, Richards, Wood) – 5:50
  - Previously unreleased, from the Emotional Rescue sessions (1980)
4. "Crazy Mama" – 4:06
  - Edited version from Black and Blue (1976)
5. "Beast of Burden" – 3:27
  - Edited version from Some Girls (1978)

== Charts ==
Album

Year	Chart	Position
1981	Billboard Pop Albums	15

Singles

Year	Single	Chart	Position
1981	"If I Was a Dancer (Dance Pt.2)"	Mainstream Rock Tracks	26

== Certifications ==
Region	Certification	Certified units/sales
New Zealand (RMNZ)	Gold	7,500^{^}
United States (RIAA)	Gold	500,000^{^}
^{^} Shipments figures based on certification alone.
