= Dance Little Sister =

Dance Little Sister may refer to:

- "Dance Little Sister" (Rolling Stones song), 1974
- "Dance Little Sister" (Terence Trent D'Arby song), 1987
