= Pay Pack & Follow =

Studio album by John Phillips
- Released: April 23, 2001
- Recorded: 1973–79
- Genre: Rock
- Length: 39:52
- Label: Eagle
- Producer: Mick Jagger. Keith Richards, Harvey Jay Goldberg

John Phillips chronology
Brewster McCloud (1970)	Pay Pack & Follow (2001)	Phillips '66 (2001)

Pay Pack & Follow is an album by American musician John Phillips, released in April 2001 following his death a month earlier. It was recorded in the 1970s for release on The Rolling Stones' record label "Rolling Stones Records" but remained unissued. Mick Jagger appears on backing vocals and co-production, Keith Richards on guitar and co-production, former Stone Mick Taylor also on guitar and current Stone Ron Wood on bass guitar.

Professional ratings
Review scores
Source	Rating
Allmusic	link

== Track listing ==
All songs written by John Phillips, except where noted.

1. "Mr Blue" – 3:49
2. "She's Just 14" – 4:55
3. "Wilderness of Love" – 3:49
4. "Oh Virginia" – 4:11
5. "Sunset Boulevard" – 4:17
6. "Pussycat" – 6:09
7. "Zulu Warrior" (Phillips, Mick Jagger) – 3:28
8. "Very Dread" – 4:37
9. "2001" – 4:37

== Personnel ==
- John Phillips – lead vocals, keyboards
- Keith Richards – electric, acoustic and slide guitars (2), backing vocals
- Mick Taylor – electric and acoustic guitars (4, 7, 8)
- Chris Spedding – electric guitar (1, 4, 5, 6, 8, 9)
- Sid McGinnis – acoustic guitar (2, 3)
- Ron Wood – bass guitar (1, 4, 7, 8)
- John Regan – bass guitar (2)
- David Wofford – bass guitar (3, 5, 6, 9)
- John Kito – keyboards, piano
- Jean Roussel – keyboards
- Paul Shaffer – keyboards
- Yogi Horton – drums
- Debra Dobkin – percussion
- Rebop Kwaku Baah – percussion
- Jeb Guthrie – tambourine
- Mick Jagger – backing vocals
- Michelle Phillips – backing vocals
- Laura MacKenzie Phillips – backing vocals
- James Biondillo – string arrangement
- Harvey Jay Goldberg & Keith Harwood - Engineers
- Liz Saron Milner & Ramona Jan - Assistant Engineers
