= Mick Taylor =

British guitarist, former member of the Rolling Stones (born 1949)

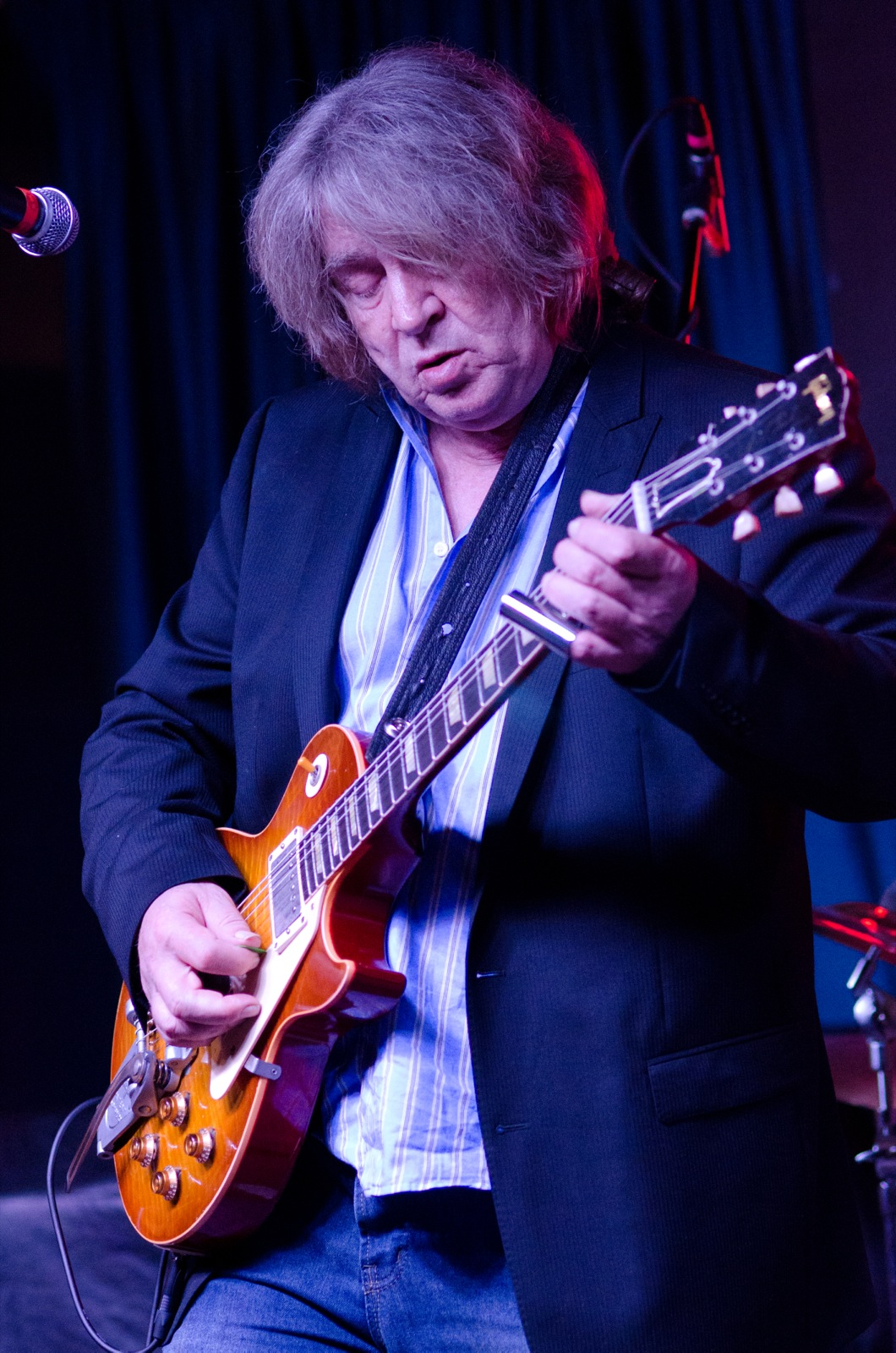
- Taylor performing in 2012

Background information
- Also known as: Little Mick
- Born: Michael Kevin Taylor; 17 January 1949 (age 77); Welwyn Garden City, Hertfordshire, England
- Genres: Rock; British blues
- Occupations: Musician; songwriter
- Instruments: Guitar; vocals
- Years active: 1962–present
- Labels: Columbia; Decca; Rolling Stones; Atlantic; EMI; Virgin; CBS; Maze
- Formerly of: John Mayall's Bluesbreakers; The Rolling Stones; The Jack Bruce Band; The Gods

Michael Kevin Taylor (born 17 January 1949) is an English guitarist, best known as a former member of John Mayall's Bluesbreakers (1967–1969) and the Rolling Stones (1969–1974). As a member of the Stones, he appeared on Let It Bleed (1969), Get Yer Ya-Ya's Out! (1970), Sticky Fingers (1971), Exile on Main St. (1972), Goats Head Soup (1973), It's Only Rock 'n Roll (1974), and Tattoo You (1981).

Since leaving the Rolling Stones in December 1974, Taylor has worked with numerous other artists and released several solo albums. From November 2012 onwards, he participated in the Stones' 50th-Anniversary shows in London and Newark, and in the band's 50 & Counting tour, which included North America, Glastonbury Festival and Hyde Park in 2013.

Taylor was ranked 37th in Rolling Stone magazine's 2011 list of the 100 greatest guitarists of all time. Guns N' Roses guitarist Slash states that Taylor has had the biggest influence on him.

== Biography ==
=== 1949–1969: Early life ===
Taylor was born to a working-class family in Welwyn Garden City, then raised in Hatfield, Hertfordshire, England, where his father worked as a fitter for the De Havilland aircraft company. He began playing guitar at age nine, learning from his mother's younger brother. As a teenager, he formed bands with schoolmates and started performing concerts under names such as the Juniors and the Strangers. They also appeared on television and put out a single. Part of the band was recruited for a new group called the Gods, which included Ken Hensley (later of Uriah Heep fame). In 1966, the Gods opened for Cream at the Starlite Ballroom in Wembley.

On 18 April 1966, at age 17, Taylor went to see a John Mayall's Bluesbreakers performance at The Hop, Woodhall Community Centre, Welwyn Garden City, and since Eric Clapton was absent, Taylor got to play instead. After playing the second set, and garnering Mayall's respect, Taylor left the stage, joined his friends and exited the venue before Mayall could speak with him. Still, this encounter proved pivotal in Taylor's career, when Mayall needed someone to fill Peter Green's vacancy the following year when Green quit to form Fleetwood Mac. Mayall placed a 'Guitarist Wanted' advert in the weekly Melody Maker music paper, and got a response from Taylor, whom he readily invited to join. Taylor made his debut with the Bluesbreakers at the Manor House, an old blues club in north London. For those in the music scene the night was an event ... "Let's go and see this 17-year-old kid try and replace Eric".

Taylor toured and recorded the album Crusade with John Mayall's Bluesbreakers. From 1966 to 1969, Taylor developed a guitar style that is blues-based with Latin and jazz influences. He is the guitarist on the Bluesbreaker albums Crusade, Diary of a Band, Bare Wires, and Blues from Laurel Canyon. Later in his career, he further developed his skills as a slide guitarist.

=== 1969–1974: The Rolling Stones ===
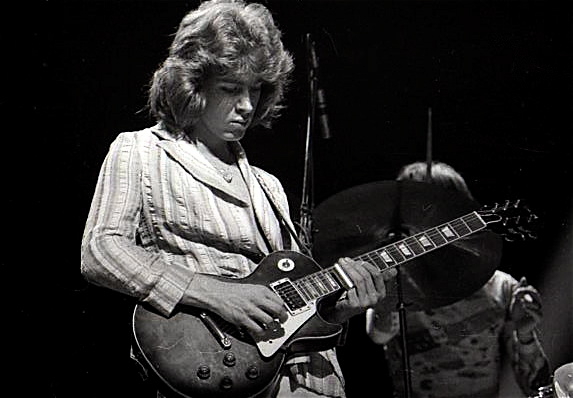
Taylor performing with the Rolling Stones in the 1970s

After Brian Jones and the Rolling Stones parted ways in June 1969, John Mayall and Ian Stewart recommended Taylor to Mick Jagger. Taylor believed he was being called in to be a session musician at his first studio session with the Rolling Stones. An impressed Jagger and Keith Richards invited Taylor back the following day to continue rehearsing and recording with the band. He overdubbed guitar on "Country Honk" and "Live With Me" for the album Let It Bleed, and on the single "Honky Tonk Women" released in the UK on 4 July 1969.

Taylor's onstage debut as a Rolling Stone, at the age of 20, was the free concert in Hyde Park, London, on 5 July 1969. An estimated quarter of a million people attended for a show that turned into a tribute to Brian Jones, who had died two days before the concert.

During their 1972 American Tour, Truman Capote profiled members of the band for an ultimately unfinished article for Rolling Stone; he would later describe Taylor to Johnny Carson on The Tonight Show as "pretty, a little Jean Harlow blond-type, but dumb, and totally uninteresting".

Between recording sessions, the band members were living in various countries as UK income tax exiles, with Taylor himself owing the Inland Revenue £22,000 after having spent less than a year and a half in the band.

Taylor took the opportunity to work on various side projects during his tenure with the Rolling Stones. In June 1973, he joined Mike Oldfield onstage at the Queen Elizabeth Hall in a performance of Oldfield's Tubular Bells. Taylor was asked to take part in this project by Richard Branson, as he felt Oldfield was a relative unknown, having just been signed to Branson's fledgling label, Virgin Records. Taylor joined Oldfield once more for a BBC television broadcast in November 1973. Taylor would also perform on the Herbie Mann albums London Underground and Reggae, both recorded in 1973.

=== 1973–1975: It's Only Rock 'n Roll ===
After the 1973 European tour (during which Taylor had taken to playing alongside opening act Billy Preston), Richards's drug problems had worsened, and began to compromise the band's ability to function. In November 1973, Taylor underwent surgery for acute sinusitis and missed some of the sessions when the band began working on the LP It's Only Rock 'n Roll at Musicland Studios in Munich. Tony Sanchez, a photographer and acquaintance, would later allege that this was related to Taylor's "ever-increasing" use of cocaine, although Taylor would later dismiss this as "complete rubbish". Not much was achieved during the first ten days at Musicland, but most of the actual recordings were made there in January 1974, and in April at Stargroves, Jagger's estate in Hampshire. When Taylor resumed work with the band, he found it difficult to get along with Richards, who was reportedly abusive, discouraging him from playing and surreptitiously erasing riffs which he had already recorded. Bill Wyman recalled that Taylor began to "get very, very moody and frustrated". According to Rolling Stones producer Andy Johns, Taylor complained that Jagger and Richards "won't let me write any songs. Any time I have an idea I'm blocked out." Johns stated that he encouraged Taylor to leave the band, and that although Taylor "would have left anyway", he blamed himself for instigating it. "It was the worst thing I ever did. It wasn't a smart move ... though they were jolly surprised when he quit. 'What is he, insane? No one's ever left us before!'"

Not long after those recording sessions, Taylor went on a six-week expedition to Brazil, travelling down the Amazon River in a boat and exploring Latin music. Just before the release of the album in October 1974, Taylor told music journalist Nick Kent from the NME about the new LP and that he had co-written "Till the Next Goodbye" and "Time Waits for No One" with Jagger. Kent told Taylor he had seen the finished artwork for the sleeve, which revealed the absence of any songwriting credits for Taylor, who "went silent for a second before muttering a curt 'We'll see about that!' almost under his breath. Actually, he sounded more resigned that anything else". Kent claimed that Taylor's wife had encouraged him to leave the band, and dismissively stated that Taylor "felt he should get songwriting credits because Keith hadn't turned up to a few sessions and he'd done a few riffs with Jagger", while Richards claimed that Taylor "never really wrote things, in spite of what he said", and that he could have resolved his creative frustrations and engaged in solo projects while still remaining a part of the band.

I was a bit peeved about not getting credit for a couple of songs, but that wasn't the whole reason [I left the band]. I guess I just felt like I had enough. I decided to leave and start a group with Jack Bruce. I never really felt, and I don't know why, but I never felt I was gonna stay with the Stones forever, even right from the beginning.

We used to fight and argue all the time. And one of the things I got angry about was that Mick had promised to give me some credit for some of the songs – and he didn't. I believed I'd contributed enough. Let's put it this way – without my contribution those songs would not have existed. There's not many but enough, things like "Sway" and "Moonlight Mile" on Sticky Fingers and a couple of others."

However, at the time, Taylor, who was apparently "determined to leave with a minimum of fuss", claimed that there "was no personal animosity in the split", and that his decision "had nothing whatsoever to do" with credits and royalties.

Taylor's last broadcast appearance with the Rolling Stones before his departure was in the promotional videos for "It's Only Rock 'n Roll (But I Like It)" and "Ain't Too Proud to Beg".

In December 1974, Taylor announced he was leaving the Rolling Stones. He was attending a party hosted by Eric Clapton in London with Mick Jagger, Ronnie Wood and record producer Marshall Chess. At some point, Taylor allegedly told Jagger he was quitting the band and walked out. Taylor's decision came as a shock to many. The Rolling Stones were due to start recording a new album in Munich, and the entire band was reportedly angry at Taylor for leaving at such short notice. Jagger claimed that he "received a call from the office that Mick Taylor wasn't coming to the Munich sessions. Then I received a call saying Mick Taylor wasn't going anywhere anymore with the Stones." In response to questions about who would replace Taylor, Jagger spitefully commented: "No doubt we can find a brilliant six foot, three inch blond guitarist who can do his own makeup." Jagger later stated that "I suppose it was a bit inconsiderate of him to inform us a day before we were about to enter the studios ... but maybe he hadn't made up his mind until that point". Bill Wyman claimed that "It was a very inconvenient time [...] I didn't think he did it very politely." Richards allegedly sent Taylor a telegram the day after he left the band, stating: "Really enjoyed playing with you for the last five years. Thanks for all the turn-ons. Best wishes and love." According to his wife, Rose, "Mick just read it and started crying." Taylor's departure was officially announced on 12 and 16 December 1974: "After five and a half years Mick [Taylor] wishes a change of scene—wants the opportunity to try out new ventures, new endeavours. While we are all most sorry that he is going, we wish him great success and much happiness". Taylor made a statement to the press:

The last five-and-a-half years with the Stones have been very exciting and proved to be a most inspiring period. And as far as my attitude to the other four members in concerned, it is one of respect for them, both as musicians and as people. I have nothing but admiration for the group, but I feel now is the time to move on and do something new.

— Mick Taylor, 20 December 1974

However, Taylor would later reveal that behind the scenes, things were more complicated:

By 1974, I felt I'd gone as far as I could with the band. I didn't think they'd stay together. The records were doing well but the band was falling apart—it was in chaos ... I told the Stones' office I was leaving, they asked for my gold Amex card. Mick [Jagger] tried to persuade me to stay, but I told him I was fed up and how my drug problems were beginning to worry me. Mick suggested taking six months off, but I've never been good at taking advice. Maybe I should have listened.

— Mick Taylor, in a 2009 interview

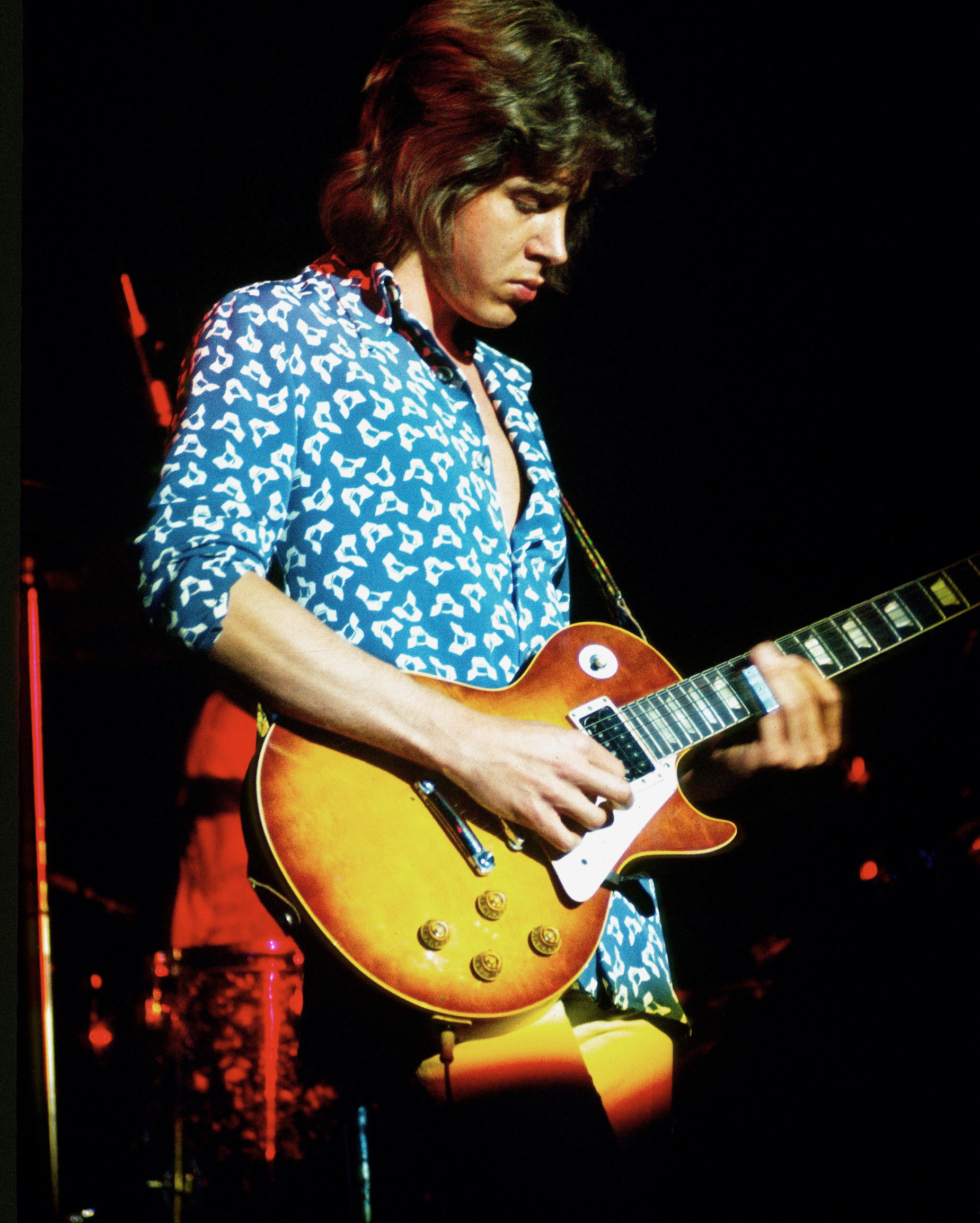
Taylor during the Rolling Stones 1972 tour in June, at Winterland in San Francisco

When interviewed by Jann Wenner of Rolling Stone in 1995, Wenner wrote that Jagger had stated that Taylor never explained why he had left, and surmised that "[Taylor] wanted to have a solo career. I think he found it difficult to get on with Keith." In the same Wenner interview, Jagger had reportedly said of Taylor's contribution to the band: "I think he had a big contribution. He made it very musical. He was a very fluent, melodic player, which we never had, and we don't have now. Neither Keith nor Ronnie Wood (who replaced Taylor) plays that kind of style. It was very good for me working with him .... Mick Taylor would play very fluid lines against my vocals. He was exciting, and he was very pretty, and it gave me something to follow, to bang off. Some people think that's the best version of the band that existed". Asked if he agreed with that assessment, Jagger said: "I obviously can't say if I think Mick Taylor was the best, because it sort of trashes the period the band is in now." Charlie Watts stated: "I think we chose the right man for the job at that time just as Ronnie was the right man for the job later on. I still think Mick is great. I haven't heard or seen him play in a few years. But certainly what came out of playing with him are musically some of the best things we've ever done". In an October 2002 Guitar World interview, Richards reflected on his relationship with Taylor: "Mick Taylor and I worked really well together ... He had some lovely energy. Sweetly sophisticated playing, way beyond his years. Lovely sense of melody. I never understood why he left the Stones. Nor does he, I think ... I had no desire to see him go." Taylor later admitted in the 2012 documentary Crossfire Hurricane that he left because he wanted to protect his family from the drug culture surrounding the band. He further stated that in order to stay alive, he needed to escape the realm of the Stones.

In an essay about the Rolling Stones published after Taylor's resignation, The New York Times music critic Robert Palmer wrote that "Taylor is the most accomplished technician who ever served as a Stone. A blues guitarist with a jazzman's flair for melodic invention, Taylor was never a rock and roller and never a showman."

Taylor has worked with his former bandmates on various occasions since leaving the Rolling Stones. In 1977 he attended London-based sessions for the John Phillips album Pay Pack & Follow, appearing on several tracks alongside Jagger (vocals), Richards (guitar) and Wood (bass).

On 14 December 1981 he performed with the band during their concert at Kemper Arena in Kansas City, Missouri. Richards appeared on stage at a Mick Taylor show at the Lone Star Cafe in New York on 28 December 1986, jamming on "Key to the Highway" and "Can't You Hear Me Knocking"; and Taylor is featured on one track ("I Could Have Stood You Up") on Richards's 1988 album Talk is Cheap. The Rock and Roll Hall of Fame inducted Taylor along with the Rolling Stones in 1989. Taylor also worked with Bill Wyman's Rhythm Kings in the early 1990s.

In addition to his contributions to Rolling Stones albums released during his tenure with the band, Taylor's guitar is also on two tracks on their 1981 release Tattoo You: "Tops" and "Waiting on a Friend", which were recorded in 1972. (Taylor is sometimes mistakenly credited as playing on "Worried About You", but the solo on that track is performed by Wayne Perkins.)

Taylor's onstage presence with the Rolling Stones is preserved on the album Get Yer Ya-Ya's Out!, recorded over four concerts at Madison Square Garden in New York and the Baltimore Civic Center in November 1969, and on the album Brussels Affair (Live 1973), compiled from two shows recorded in Brussels on 17 October 1973 in the Forest National Arena, during their European Tour. Taylor's live performances also feature in the documentary films Stones in the Park (released on DVD in 2001), Gimme Shelter (released in 1970) and Cocksucker Blues (unreleased); and in the concert film Ladies and Gentlemen: The Rolling Stones (shown in cinemas in 1974, and released on DVD and Blu-ray in 2010); these performances were also released on an album with the same title. Bootleg recordings from the Rolling Stones' tours from 1969 through 1973 also document Taylor's concert performances with the Rolling Stones.

For the 2010 re-release of Exile on Main St. Taylor worked with Jagger at a London studio in November 2009 to record new guitar and vocal parts for the previously unreleased song, "Plundered My Soul". The track was selected by the Rolling Stones for release as a limited edition single on Record Store Day.

On 24 October 2012, the Rolling Stones announced, via their latest Rolling Stone magazine interview, that Bill Wyman and Mick Taylor were expected to join the Rolling Stones on stage at the upcoming November shows in London. Richards went on to say that the pair would strictly be guests. At the two London shows on 25 and 29 November, Taylor played on "Midnight Rambler".

During an interview on the Late Night with Jimmy Fallon show (broadcast on 8 April 2013), Richards stated that Taylor would be performing with the Stones for their upcoming 2013 tour dates. Between 25 November 2012 and 13 July 2013 Taylor joined the Stones' 50 & Counting Tour performing at each of the 30 shows across Europe and North America, including sitting in on four songs at the Staples Center in Los Angeles and several numbers during their headline set at the Glastonbury Festival. The tour ended with two concerts at Hyde Park, London, which resulted in the album, Hyde Park Live and the concert film Sweet Summer Sun: Live in Hyde Park. He once again accompanied the Stones between 21 February and 22 November 2014 for the 29 dates of the 14 On Fire concerts across Asia, Europe and Australia/New Zealand.

=== 1975–1988: Post-Stones ===
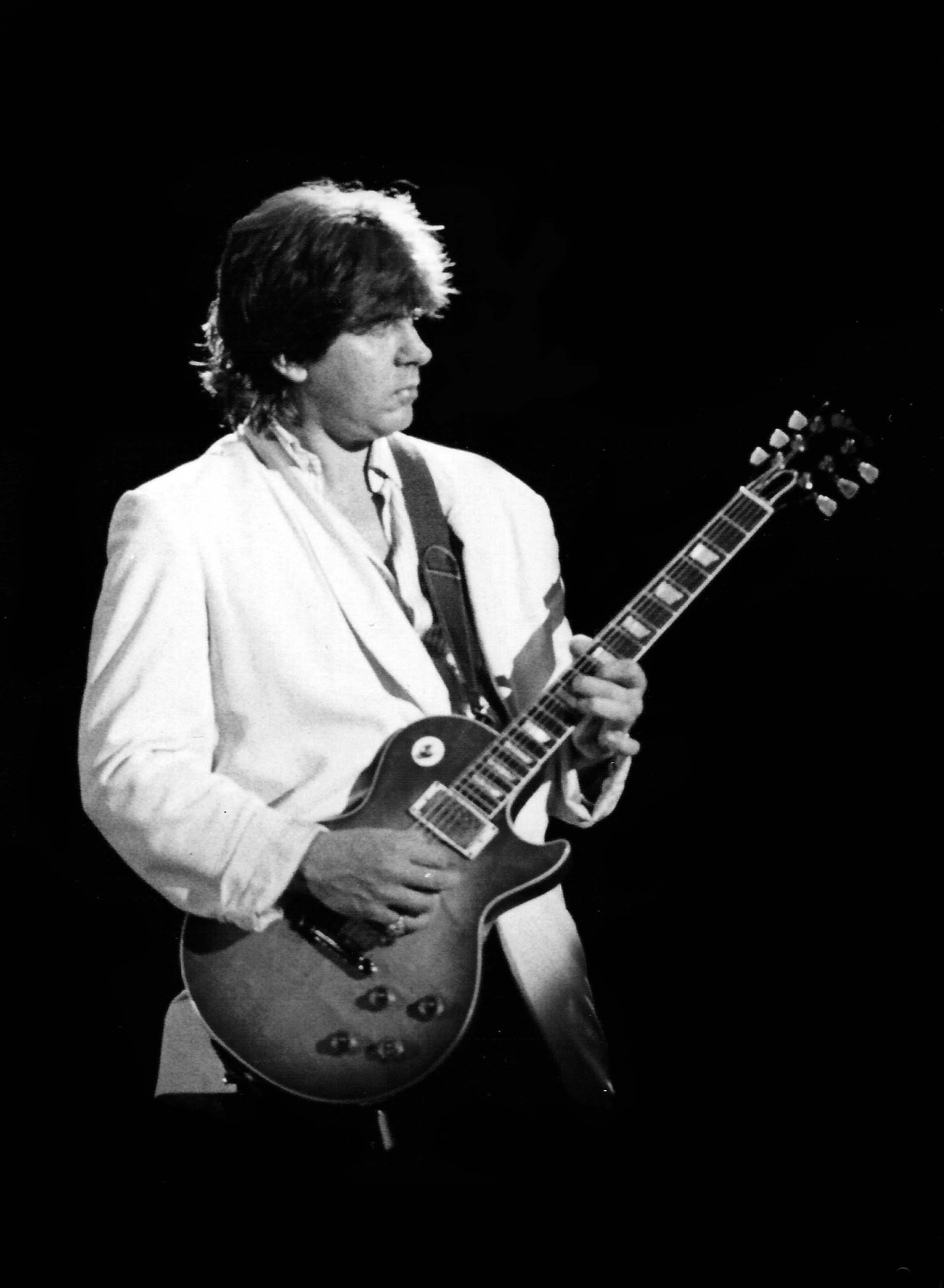
Taylor in Barcelona in 1984

After his resignation from the Rolling Stones, Taylor was invited by Jack Bruce to form a new band with keyboardist Carla Bley and drummer Bruce Gary. In 1975 the band began rehearsals in London with tour dates scheduled for later that year. The group toured Europe, with a sound leaning more toward jazz, including a performance at the Dutch Pinkpop Festival, but disbanded the following year. A performance, recorded on 1 June 1975 (which was finally released on CD in 2003 as Live at Manchester Free Trade Hall '75 by The Jack Bruce Band), and another performance from The Old Grey Whistle Test, seem to be the only material available from this brief collaboration. Tony Sanchez claimed to have encountered Taylor some time after he left the Rolling Stones "living with a lady who pushed cocaine for a living", and that "he had been reduced to selling off his gold discs."

Taylor appeared as a special guest of Little Feat at London's Rainbow Theatre in 1977, sharing slide guitar with then-frontman Lowell George on "A Apolitical Blues": this song appears on Little Feat's critically acclaimed live album Waiting for Columbus.

In the summer of 1977, Taylor collaborated with Pierre Moerlen's Gong for the album Expresso II, released in 1978. Taylor began writing new songs and recruiting musicians for a solo album and worked on projects with Miller Anderson, Alan Merrill and others. He was present at many of the recording sessions for John Phillips's prospective second solo album. The recordings for Phillips's LP took place in London over a prolonged period between 1973 and 1977. This led to Taylor working with Keith Richards and Mick Jagger who were also involved with the album. The LP was to be released on the Stones' own label Rolling Stones Records (distributed by Atlantic Records). Ahmet Ertegun decided to pull the plug on the project after hearing alarming reports of excessive drug use by Phillips and Richards, but bootleg recordings of the sessions circulated among fans under the titles "Half Stoned" and "Phillips '77". Eventually Eagle Rock Records made funds available to restore the original, rescued tapes and the album finally saw an official release in 2002 as Pay Pack & Follow.

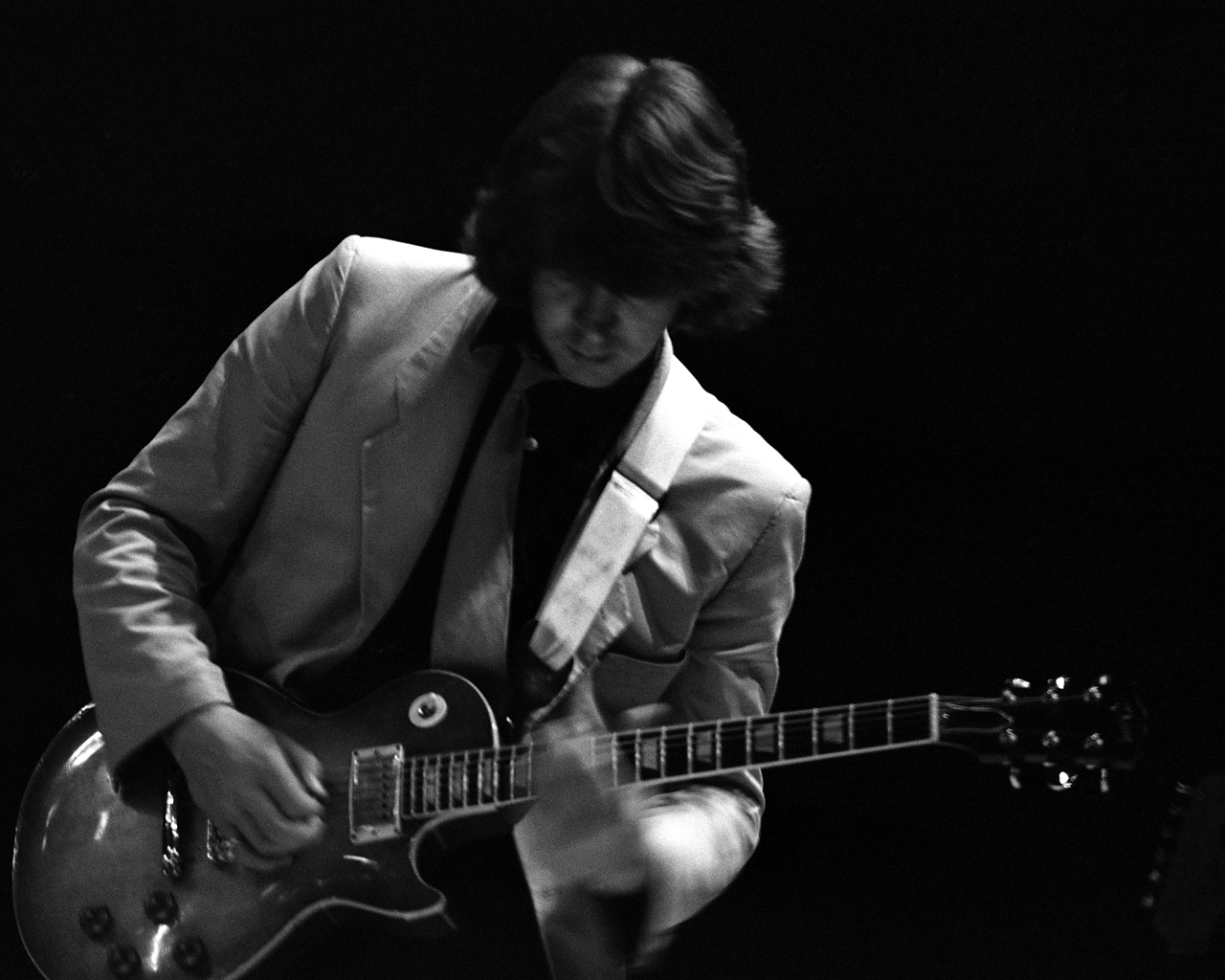
Taylor performing with John Mayall in the early 1980s

In 1977 Taylor signed a solo recording deal with Columbia Records. By April 1978 he had given several interviews to music magazines to promote a new, completed album which mixed rock, jazz and Latin-flavoured blues musical styles. The album, titled Mick Taylor, was finally released by Columbia Records in 1979 and reached No. 119 on the Billboard charts in early August, with a stay of five weeks on the Billboard 200. CBS advised Taylor to promote the album through American radio stations but was unwilling to back him for any supporting tour. Frustrated with this situation, Taylor took a break from the music industry for about a year.

In 1981 he toured Europe and the United States with Alvin Lee of Ten Years After, sharing the bill with Black Sabbath. He spent most of 1982 and 1983 on the road with John Mayall, for the "Reunion Tour" with John McVie of Fleetwood Mac and Colin Allen. During this tour Bob Dylan showed up backstage at The Roxy in Los Angeles to meet Taylor.

In 1983, Taylor joined Mark Knopfler and played on Dylan's Infidels album. He also appeared on Dylan's live album Real Live, as well as the follow-up studio album Empire Burlesque. In 1984, Dylan asked Taylor to assemble an experienced rock and roll band for a European tour he signed with Bill Graham. Ian McLagan was hired to play piano and Hammond organ, Greg Sutton to play bass and Colin Allen, a long-time friend of Taylor, on drums. The tour lasted for four weeks at venues such as Munich's Olympic Stadium Arena, Verona's Arena, and Milan's San Siro Stadium, sharing the bill with Carlos Santana and Joan Baez, who appeared on the same bill for a couple of shows.

=== 1988–present ===
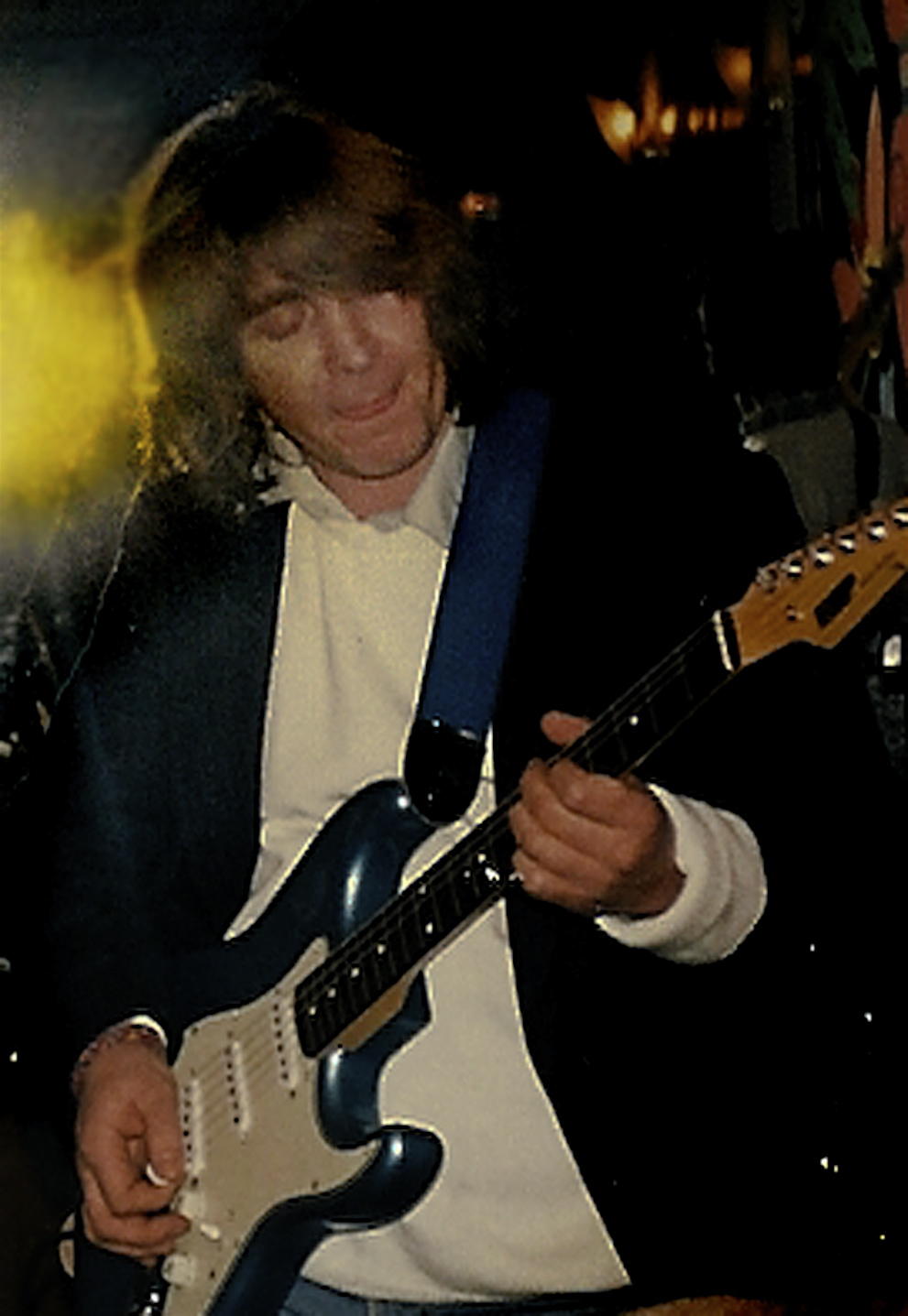
Taylor performing in Wonderland Blues New York, 1989

Taylor performed the lead guitar solo on the 1988 Joan Jett and the Blackhearts top-10 single, "I Hate Myself for Loving You". Taylor guested with the Grateful Dead on 24 September 1988 at the last show of that year's Madison Square Garden run in New York. Taylor lived in New York throughout the 1980s. He battled with addiction problems before getting back on track in the second half of the 1980s and moving to Los Angeles in 1990. During this time Taylor did session work and toured in Europe, America and Japan with a band including; either Eric Parker or Bernard Purdie on drums, Wilbur Bascomb on bass, Max Middleton (formerly of the Jeff Beck Group), Shane Fontayne, and Blondie Chaplin. He also played on the Dramarama album Vinyl, a throwback to classic rock that Taylor was an important part of from the previous decade, playing all guitar tracks, which, ironically, included The Rolling Stones slide guitar song "Memo From Turner". In 1990, his CD Stranger in This Town was released by Maze Records, backed up by a mini-tour including the record release party at the Hard Rock Cafe as well as gigs at the Paradise Theater.

He began what was to be a significant series of collaborations with Los Angeles-based Carla Olson with their "Live at the Roxy" album Too Hot For Snakes, the centrepiece of which is an extended seven-minute performance of "Sway". Another highlight is the lead track on the album, "Who Put the Sting (On the Honey Bee)", by Olson's then-bassist Jesse Sublett. It was followed by Olson's Within An Ace, which featured Taylor on seven songs. He appeared on three songs from Reap The Whirlwind and then again on Olson's The Ring of Truth, on which he plays lead guitar on nine tracks, including a twelve-minute version of the song "Winter". Further work by Olson and Taylor can be heard on the Olson-produced Barry Goldberg album Stoned Again. Taylor went on to appear on Percy Sledge's Blue Night (1994), along with Steve Cropper, Bobby Womack and Greg Leisz.

After spending two years as a resident of Miami, during which time he played with a band called 'Tumbling Dice' featuring Bobby Keys, Nicky Hopkins and others, Taylor moved back to England in the mid-1990s. He released a new album in 1998 entitled A Stone's Throw. Playing at clubs and theatres as well as appearing at festivals has kept Taylor connected with an appreciative audience and fan base.

In 2003, Taylor reunited with John Mayall for his 70th Birthday Concert in Liverpool along with Eric Clapton. A year later, in autumn 2004, he also joined John Mayall and the Bluesbreakers for a UK theatre tour. He toured the US East Coast with the Experience Hendrix group during October 2007. The Experience Hendrix group appeared at a series of concerts to honour Jimi Hendrix and his musical legacy. Players included Taylor, Mitch Mitchell, Billy Cox, Buddy Guy, Hubert Sumlin and Robby Krieger.

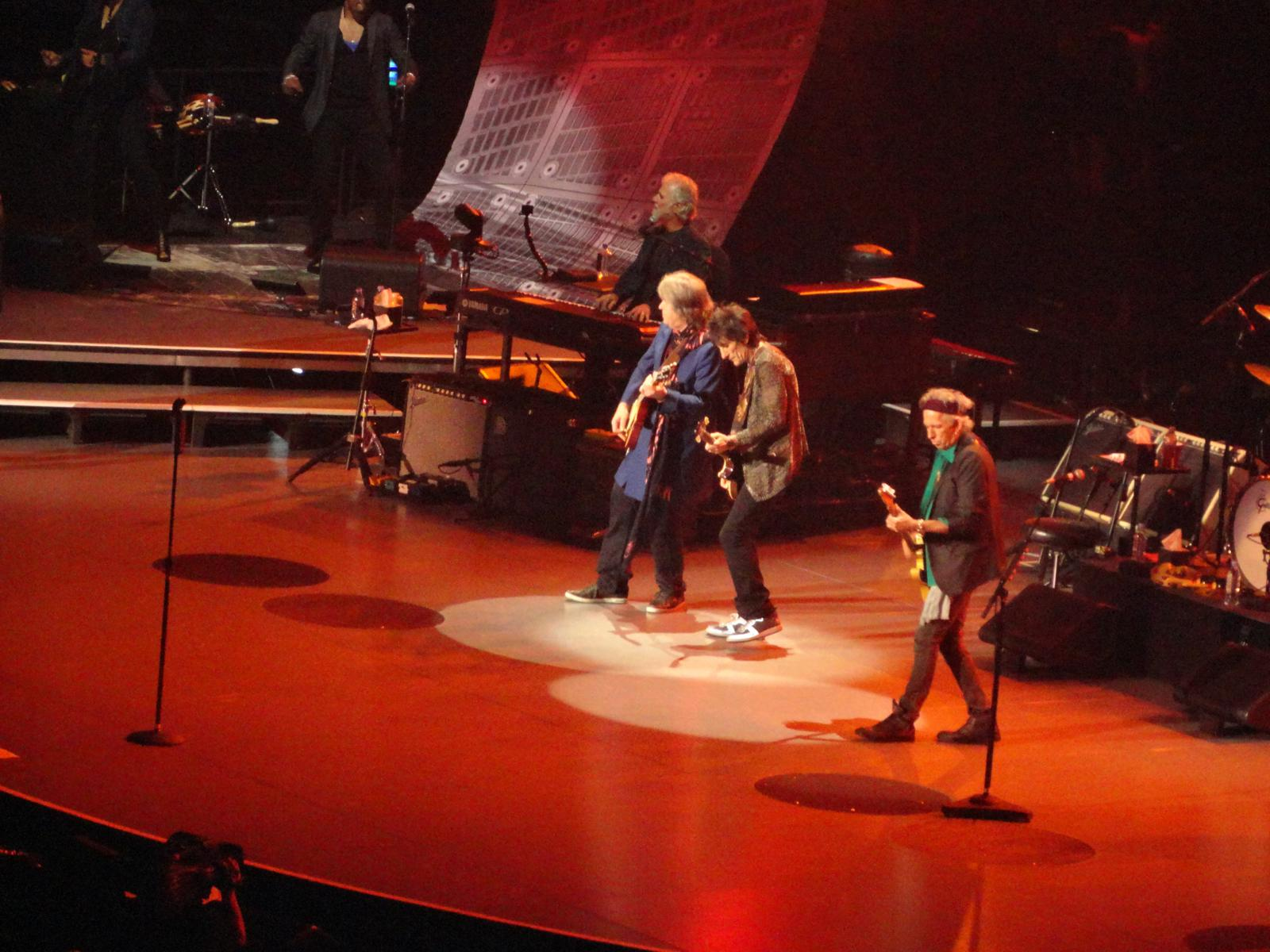
Taylor performing with the Rolling Stones on their 50 & Counting Tour in Boston, MA, 12 June 2013

On 1 December 2010, Taylor reunited with Ronnie Wood at a benefit gig arranged by blues guitarist Stephen Dale Petit to save the 100 Club in London. Other special guests at the show were Dick Taylor (first bassist in the Rolling Stones) and blues/jazz trombonist Chris Barber. Taylor toured the UK with Petit, appearing as his special guest, featured on a Paul Jones BBC Radio 2 session with him and guested on Petit's 2010 album, The Crave.

Taylor also helped to promote the Boogie for Stu album, recorded by Ben Waters to honour Ian Stewart (original Stones pianist and co-founder of the band), by taking part in a concert to mark the CD's official launch at the Ambassadors Theatre, London on 9 March 2011. Proceeds from the event were donated to the British Heart Foundation. Although Jagger and Richards didn't show up, Taylor noticeably enjoyed performing with Watts, Wood and Wyman, among others. In 2012, Taylor rejoined the Rolling Stones as a special guest on their 50 & Counting Tour, typically performing "Midnight Rambler" in a prominent lead guitar role.

Taylor reunited with Ronnie Wood again at Bluesfest, on 1 November 2013, at the Royal Albert Hall in London. The event was recorded and released as the album Mr. Luck – A Tribute to Jimmy Reed: Live at the Royal Albert Hall in 2021.

Guns N' Roses guitarist Slash states that Taylor had the biggest influence on him.

== Equipment ==
Throughout his career, Taylor has used various guitars, but is mostly associated with the Gibson Les Paul. His first Les Paul was bought when he was still playing with The Gods (from Selmer's, London in '65). He acquired his second Les Paul in 1967, not long after joining The Bluesbreakers: Taylor came to Olympic Studios to buy a Les Paul that Keith Richards wanted to sell. On the Rolling Stones' 1972 and 1973 tours, Taylor used at least two sunburst Les Paul guitars, both without a Bigsby. Other guitars used by Taylor include a Gibson ES-355 used during the recording of Sticky Fingers and Exile on Main St., a Gibson SG on the 1969, 1970 and 1971 tours, and occasionally a Fender Stratocaster and a Fender Telecaster. For an instructional DVD entitled Mick Taylor: Rock, Blues and Slide Guitar, he used a Stratocaster. He also started playing the Vigier Excalibur in 1997.

Though Taylor is primarily known as an electric guitarist he has also contributed acoustic guitar, bass guitar, backing vocals, keyboards and synthesizers to solo and guest recordings.

== Personal life ==
Taylor has been married twice and has two daughters. Chloe (born 6 January 1971) is a daughter by his first wife, Rose Millar (sister of Robin Millar). Taylor married Millar in 1975 after leaving the Stones, but the relationship was reportedly "in tatters" before long and resulted in divorce only a few years later. Taylor's daughter Emma was born from a short relationship with an American woman, Susan McMinamin, who sang backing vocals with Taylor's band on one occasion. Taylor is in a relationship with Marlies Damming. They live in Damming's home country of the Netherlands in the village of Diever.

== Awards ==
- Inducted into the Rock 'n Roll Hall of Fame (with the Rolling Stones, 1989)
- Taylor's handprints have been on Hollywood's RockWalk since 6 September 1998.
- Taylor was ranked in 37th place by Rolling Stone magazine in its 2012 list of the 100 greatest guitarists of all time.

== Discography ==
=== With John Mayall's Bluesbreakers ===
- Crusade (Decca, 1967/LP; 1987/CD)
- The Diary of A Band, Volumes 1 & 2 (Decca, 1968/2LP; 2007/2CD)
- Bare Wires (Decca, 1968/LP; 1988/CD)
- Blues from Laurel Canyon (Decca, 1968/LP; 1989/CD)
- Back to the Roots (Polydor, 1971/LP; 2001/2CD)
- Primal Solos (Decca, 1977/LP; 1990/CD) – selection of live recordings 1965 (with Eric Clapton), and 1968 (with Mick Taylor)
- Return of the Bluesbreakers (AIM, 1985/LP; 1993/CD)
- Wake Up Call (Silvertone, 1993/CD)
- The 1982 Reunion Concert (Repertoire, 1994/CD) – with John Mayall, John McVie, and Colin Allen
- Silver Tones: The Best of John Mayall & The Bluesbreakers (Silvertone, 1998/CD)
- Along for the Ride (Eagle, 2001/CD)
- Rolling with the Blues (Recall, 2005/2CD) – selection of live recordings 1972, 1973, 1980, and 1982
- Essentially John Mayall (Eagle, 2007/5-CD box set)

=== With The Rolling Stones ===
- Through the Past, Darkly (Decca, 1969) – (compilation) UK/US number 2

Taylor plays on "Honky Tonk Women"

- Let It Bleed (Decca, 1969) – UK number 1 / US number 3

Taylor plays on "Country Honk" and "Live With Me"

- Live'r Than You'l Ever Be (?, 1969) – bootleg, certified Gold Album
- Get Yer Ya-Ya's Out! (Decca, 1970) – UK number 1 / US number 6
- Sticky Fingers (Rolling Stones Records, 1971) – UK/US number 1
- Gimme Shelter (Decca, 1971) – (compilation) UK number 19
- Hot Rocks 1964–1971 (Abkco Records, 1972) – (compilation) UK number 3 / US number 4
- Exile on Main St. (Rolling Stones Records, 1972) – UK/US number 1
- Rock'n'Rolling Stones (Decca, 1972) – (compilation) UK number 41
- Goats Head Soup (Rolling Stones Records, 1973) – UK/US number 1
- It's Only Rock 'n Roll (Rolling Stones Records, 1974) – UK number 2 / US number 1
- Made in the Shade (Rolling Stones Records, 1975) – (compilation) UK number 14 / US number 6
- Metamorphosis (Abkco Records, 1975) – (compilation) UK number 45 / US number 8

Taylor plays on "I Don't Know Why" and "Jiving Sister Fanny".

- Rolled Gold: The Very Best of the Rolling Stones (Decca, 1975) – (compilation) UK number 7
- Get Stoned (30 Greatest Hits) (ARCADE, 1977) – (compilation) UK number 8
- Sucking in the Seventies (Rolling Stones Records, 1981) – (compilation) US number 15
- Tattoo You (Rolling Stones Records, 1981) – UK number 2 / US number 1

Taylor plays on "Tops" and "Waiting on a Friend", both tracks recorded in 1972 during the Goats Head Soup sessions.

- In Concert – Live 1966–70 (LONDON, 1982) – (live compilation) UK number 94
- Story of The Stones (K-tel, 1982) – (compilation) UK number 24
- Rewind (Rolling Stones Records, 1984) – (compilation) UK number 23 / US number 86
- Singles Collection: The London Years. (Abkco Records, 1989) – US number 91
- Jump Back: The Best of The Rolling Stones (Rolling Stones Records, 1993) – UK number 16 / US number 30
- Forty Licks (Rolling Stones Records, 2002) – (compilation) UK/US number 2
- Rarities 1971–2003 (Rolling Stones Records, 2005) – US number 76

Taylor plays on "Let It Rock" (live 1971) and the 1974 b-side "Through The Lonely Nights".

- Exile on Main St. (Rarities Edition) (Universal Records, 2010) – US number 27

Taylor plays on "Pass The Wine (Sophia Loren)", "Plundered My Soul", "I'm Not Signifying", "Loving Cup (Alternate Take)", "Soul Survivor (Alternate Take)" and "Good Time Women".

- Brussels Affair (Rolling Stones Records, 2011) – 1973 live performance
- GRRR! (Rolling Stones Records, 2012) – (compilation) UK number 3 / US number 19
- Hyde Park Live (Rolling Stones Records, 2013) – (2013 live performance) UK number 16 / US number 19

Taylor plays guitar on "Midnight Rambler", acoustic guitar and backing vocals on "(I Can't Get No) Satisfaction"

- Tattoo You (Lost & Found - Rarities) (Universal Records, 2021)

Taylor plays on "Living in the Heart of Love", "Come to the Ball" and "Fast Talking Slow Walking".

Non-Rolling Stones work with Rolling Stones members:

- Pay Pack & Follow (Eagle Rock Records, 2001) – John Phillips solo album

from 1973 to 1979 recording sessions in London aka "Half Stoned" sessions
produced by Mick Jagger and Keith Richards

- I've Got My Own Album to Do (Warner, 1974) – Ronnie Wood solo album
- Now Look (Warner, July 1975) – Ronnie Wood solo album. US number 118
- Gimme Some Neck (Columbia, 1979) – Ronnie Wood solo album. US number 45
- Talk Is Cheap (BMG, 1988) – Keith Richards solo album. UK number 37 / US number 24

=== With Jack Bruce ===
- Live on the Old Grey Whistle Test (Strange Fruit, 1995) – Tracks from several Old Grey Whistle Test shows recorded between 1975 and 1981. Seven of the songs feature Taylor on guitar.
- Live at the Manchester Free Trade Hall (Polydor, 2003) – 2 CDs.

=== With Bob Dylan ===
- Infidels (Columbia, 1983) – UK number 9 / US number 20
- Real Live (In Europe, 1984) (Columbia, 1984) – UK number 54 / US number 115
- Empire Burlesque (Columbia, 1985) – UK number 11 / US number 33
- The Bootleg Series Volumes 1–3 (Rare & Unreleased) 1961–1991 (Columbia, 1991) – UK number 32 / US number 49
- The Bootleg Series Vol. 16: Springtime in New York 1980–1985 (Columbia, 2021). Featured on Discs 3-5 of the Deluxe Edition.

=== With Carla Olson ===
- Live: Too Hot For Snakes (Razor Edge Records, 1991) – a.k.a. Live at the Roxy; includes two Mick Taylor compositions: "Broken Hands" and "Hartley Quits".
- Too Hot For Snakes Plus (Collectors' Choice, 2008) – 2-CD set of the Roxy album plus "You Gotta Move", and a second disc of 13 studio tracks from 1993 to 2004, including a previously unreleased versions of "Winter", and "Think I'm Goin' Mad" from the Olson-produced Barry Goldberg album Stoned Again.
- Within An Ace (Watermelon Records, 1993) – Taylor performs on seven of the 10 songs.
- Reap The Whirlwind (Watermelon Records, 1994) – Taylor is featured on three tracks.
- The Ring of Truth (Smile Records, 2001) – Taylor plays on nine of the 12 tracks.
- Sway: The Best of Carla Olson & Mick Taylor (Sunset Blvd Records, 2020) – a vinyl-only compilation
- Too Hot For Snakes and The Ring of Truth were released as a 2-CD set by Fuel 2000/Universal, autumn of 2012 (with three bonus tracks including two previously unreleased songs from the Roxy).

=== Solo discography ===
Studio albums

- Mick Taylor (1979) US number 119 (five weeks in top 200)
- A Stone's Throw (1998)

Live albums

- Stranger in This Town (1990) (produced by Mick Taylor and Phil Colella)
- Arthur's Club-Geneve 1995 (Mick Taylor & Snowy White) (Promo CD/TV Especial)
- Coastin' Home [AKA Live at the 14 Below] (1995) re-issued 2002
- 14 Below (2003)
- Little Red Rooster (2007) recorded live in Hungary during 2001 with the Mick Taylor Band

== Other session work ==
- Slim's Got His Thing Goin' On (Sunnyland Slim) (World Pacific 1969)
- Blues Masters vol. 10 (Champion Jack Dupree) (Blue Horizon, 1969) Recorded just weeks before he joined the Stones, according to producer Mike Vernon's liner notes.
- Up Your Alley (Joan Jett & the Blackhearts) on "I Hate Myself for Loving You"
- Tubular Bells Premiere (Mike Oldfield) (June '73) Queen Elizabeth Hall
- Tubular Bells (Mike Oldfield) Telecast Tubular Bells Part One and Tubular Bells Part Two. Recorded at BBC Broadcasting House November 1973 and aired in early '74 and June '74. Available on Oldfield's Elements DVD.
- The Tin Man Was a Dreamer (Nicky Hopkins) (1973)
- London Underground (Herbie Mann) (Atlantic, 1973)
- Reggae (Herbie Mann) (Atlantic, 1973)
- Live European Tour (Billy Preston) (A&M Records, 1974). Recorded with the Rolling Stones Mobile Studio during their '73 tour. Preston opened up for the band with Mick Taylor on guitar. (Released on CD by A&M Japan, 2002.)
- Have Blues Will Travel (Speedo Jones) (Integrity Records, 1988)
- Reggae II (Herbie Mann) (Atlantic, 1973 [1976])
- Just A Story From America (Elliott Murphy) (Columbia 1977)
- Waiting for Columbus (Little Feat) (1978) double CD released 2002
- Expresso II (Gong) (1978)
- Downwind (Pierre Moerlen's Gong) (1979) lead guitar on "What You Know"
- Alan Merrill (Alan Merrill)'s solo album (Polydor, 1985) recorded in London 1977
- Vinyl (Dramarama) (1991)
- John McVie's "Gotta Band" with Lola Thomas (1992)
- Burnin' Blues (Coupe De Villes) (1992)
- Piedra rodante (Tonky Blues Band) (1992)
- Once in a Blue Moon (Gerry Groom) (1993)
- Cartwheels (Anthony Thistlethwaite) (1993)
- Hecho en Memphis (Ratones Paranoicos) (Sony Music) (1993)
- Let's Get Stoned (The Chesterfield Kings) (Mirror Records,1994)
- Crawfish and Caviar (Anthony Thistlethwaite)
- Blue Night (Percy Sledge) (Virgin Records, 1994)
- Black Angel (Savage Rose) (1995) guitar on "Black Angel" and "Early Morning Blues"
- Навигатор (Аквариум, 1995) guitar on two tracks ("Не Коси", "Таможенный блюз")
- Taylormade (Black Cat Bone, 1997), Music Maniac Records.
- Mick & I (2001) Miyuki & Mick Taylor
- The New York Times (Adam Bomb) (2001) (Taylor plays slide guitar on "MacDougal Street" & lead guitar on "Heaven come to me") produced by Jack Douglas
- From Clarksdale To Heaven [various artists] (BlueStorm, 2002) – John Lee Hooker tribute album
- Stoned Again (Barry Goldberg) (Antone's Records, 2002)
- Meaning of Life (Todd Sharpville) (Cathouse/Universal, 2003)
- Key To Love (Debbie Davies) (Shanachie Records, 2003)
- Shadow Man (re-release of an album from 1996) (2003) – originally released by Alpha Music in Japan in 1996, this "Mick Taylor featuring Sasha" album should have read "Sasha featuring Mick Taylor", but the company felt it would sell better under a household name. It features Mick Taylor on guitar, but is basically a Sasha Gracanin album.
- Treasure Island (Nikki Sudden) (Secretly Canadian, 2004)
- Unterwegs (Crazy Chris Kramer) (2009)
- Chicago Blues (Crazy Chris Kramer) (2010)
- Cat's Eyes (Robin Millar) (Apcor, 2019) - recorded in 1974, not released until 2019. It features Mick Taylor on guitar and as Producer.

== Music DVDs ==
- Blues Alive video (RCA/Columbia Pictures 1983), recorded at Capitol Theatre, NJ 1982
- Jamming with the Blues Greats – DVD release from the 1983 video, featuring John Mayall's Bluesbreakers (Mick Taylor, Colin Allen, John McVie) and special guests Albert King, Etta James, Buddy Guy, Junior Wells and Sippie Wallace (Lightyear/Image Entertainment 2005)
- The Stones in the Park concert video (Granada Television, 1969)

released on DVD (VCI, 2001)

- Gimme Shelter (Maysles Films, 1970) music documentary film by Albert and David Maysles, shot at the Rolling Stones concerts at Madison Square Garden, NY on 27/28 November and Altamont, CA on 6 December 1969.

restored and released on DVD (Criterion, 2000)

- John Mayall, the Godfather of British Blues documentary about John Mayall's life and career (Eagle Rock, 2004. Region 1: 2005)
- 70th Birthday Concert (Eagle Rock, 2004. Region 1: 2005). Bluesbreakers Charity Concert (Unite for UNICEF) filmed in Liverpool, July 2003. John Mayall & the Bluesbreakers with special guests Chris Barber, Eric Clapton and Mick Taylor.
- Stones in Exile 2010
- Ladies & Gentlemen The Rolling Stones 2010

Music DVDs – Unofficial

- Cocksucker Blues

== Filmography ==
- The Man Who Fell to Earth (1976) directed by Nicolas Roeg and starring David Bowie as Thomas Jerome Newton.

Taylor played guitar on various songs, including "Hello Mary Lou" after developing ideas for the soundtrack with John Phillips.

- The Last of the Finest (1990) directed by John Mackenzie. Taylor assisted composer Jack Nitzsche with the moviescore.
- Bad City Blues (1999) directed by Michael Stevens, based on the book by Tim Willocks.

Music composers: Mick Taylor and Max Middleton
