= Made in the Shade =

Greatest hits album by The Rolling Stones
- Released: 6 June 1975
- Recorded: December 1969 – May 1974
- Genre: Rock
- Length: 39:35
- Label: Rolling Stones/Atlantic
- Producers: Jimmy Miller, The Glimmer Twins

The Rolling Stones chronology
It's Only Rock 'n Roll (1974)	Made in the Shade (1975)	Black and Blue (1976)

Made in the Shade is the fourth official compilation album by the Rolling Stones, and the first under their Atlantic Records contract. Released in June 1975, it covers material from Sticky Fingers (1971), Exile on Main St. (1972), Goats Head Soup (1973) and It's Only Rock 'n' Roll (1974).

== Background ==
The Stones had two previous "official" compilation albums on Decca Records, Big Hits (High Tide and Green Grass) in 1966 and Through the Past, Darkly (Big Hits Vol. 2) in 1969. In addition, 1971's Hot Rocks 1964–1971 and 1972's More Hot Rocks (Big Hits & Fazed Cookies) were released by Allen Klein's ABKCO Records without the Rolling Stones' authorisation.

The material on Made in the Shade surveys the highlights from the band's first four post-Decca/London era albums thus far, with no new material.

Although Made in the Shade bought the Rolling Stones time to deliver their next studio album (they were midway through recording Black and Blue upon this album's June 1975 release), it was also released to capitalize on the band's summer Tour of the Americas.

== Release and reception ==
Professional ratings
Review scores
Source	Rating
AllMusic	3/5 stars
Christgau's Record Guide	C+
Tom Hull	B+

Made in the Shade, which had to compete with the latest cash-in ABKCO release (which came out the same day)—this time an outtakes compilation called Metamorphosis—reached No. 14 on the UK Albums Chart and No. 6 on the US Billboard 200, eventually going platinum. Subsequent Rolling Stones compilation albums have also anthologised tracks included on this album.

Robert Christgau writes in his review: "Six tracks from two of the greatest albums of the decade and four from two of the more dubious ones. Not the four best, either."

In 2005, Made in the Shade was remastered and reissued by Virgin Records.

== Track listing ==
All tracks are written by Mick Jagger and Keith Richards.

Side one
No.	Title	Original release	Length
1.	"Brown Sugar"	Sticky Fingers, 1971	3:50
2.	"Tumbling Dice"	Exile on Main St., 1972	3:30
3.	"Happy"	Exile on Main St.	3:00
4.	"Dance Little Sister"	It's Only Rock 'n Roll, 1974	4:12
5.	"Wild Horses"	Sticky Fingers	5:41
Total length:			20:13

Side two
No.	Title	Original release	Length
1.	"Angie"	Goats Head Soup, 1973	4:31
2.	"Bitch"	Sticky Fingers	3:42
3.	"It's Only Rock 'n Roll"	It's Only Rock 'n Roll	5:08
4.	"Doo Doo Doo Doo Doo (Heartbreaker)"	Goats Head Soup	3:27
5.	"Rip This Joint"	Exile on Main St.	2:24
Total length:			19:12

== Personnel ==
The Rolling Stones

- Mick Jagger – lead vocals (all except 3), backing vocals (1, 3, 5, 8–9), percussion (1), electric guitar (2)
- Keith Richards – electric guitar (all except 6), acoustic guitar (1, 5–6), backing vocals (2–3, 5, 7–10); bass guitar (3, 9), lead vocals (3)
- Mick Taylor – electric guitar (1–2, 4, 7, 9–10), acoustic guitar (5–6), slide guitar (2); bass guitar (2), backing vocals (9)
- Bill Wyman – bass guitar (1, 4–7)
- Charlie Watts – drums (1–2, 4–7, 9–10)

Additional Personnel

- Bobby Keys – tenor saxophone (1–2, 7, 9–10), baritone saxophone (3), tambourine (3)
- Ian Stewart – piano (1, 4, 8)
- Nicky Hopkins – piano (2, 6, 10)
- Jimmy Miller – drums (2–3), percussion (7)
- Clydie King, Venetta Fields, Sherlie Matthews – backing vocals (2)
- Jim Price – trumpet (2–3, 7, 10), trombone (2–3, 10), horn arrangement (9)
- Jim Dickinson – piano (5)
- Nicky Harrison – string arrangement (6)
- David Bowie – backing vocals (8)
- Kenney Jones – drums (8)
- Willie Weeks – bass guitar (8)
- Ronnie Wood – twelve-string acoustic guitar (8), backing vocals (8)
- Billy Preston – clavinet (9), piano (9)
- Chuck Findley – trumpet (9)
- Jim Horn – alto saxophone (9)
- Bill Plummer – double bass (10)

== Charts ==
Chart performance for Made in the Shade
Chart (1975)	Peak position
Australian Albums (Kent Music Report)	71
Canada Top Albums/CDs (RPM)	43
Italian Albums (Musica e Dischi)	20
New Zealand Albums (RMNZ)	31
UK Albums (Official Charts)	14
US Billboard 200	6

== Certifications ==
Certifications for Made in the Shade
Region	Certification	Certified units/sales
Canada (Music Canada)	Gold	50,000^{^}
United States (RIAA)	Platinum	1,000,000^{^}
^{^} Shipments figures based on certification alone.
