= Till the Next Goodbye =

Song by The Rolling Stones

from the album It's Only Rock 'n Roll
- Released: 18 October 1974
- Recorded: November 1973, January / May 1974
- Genre: Roots rock, blues rock, country rock
- Length: 4:37
- Label: Rolling Stones/Virgin
- Songwriter(s): Jagger/Richards
- Producer(s): The Glimmer Twins

"Till the Next Goodbye" is a song by the English rock band the Rolling Stones, featured on its 1974 album It's Only Rock 'n Roll.

Credited to Mick Jagger and Keith Richards recording on "Till the Next Goodbye" began at Munich's Musicland Studios in November 1973. The song is a traditional ballad from the Stones' middle period, with slight country music influences. It opens with an acoustic guitar which leads into Jagger's performance. The lyrics deal with the "illicit meetings between two lovers";

Honey, is there any place that you would like to eat? I know a coffee shop down on 52nd Street; And I don't need no fancy food and I don't need no fancy wine; And I sure don't need the tears you cry

The song's chorus is notable as the title is elongated into the phrase "Till the next time we say goodbye."

Yeah, a movie house on 42nd Street, Ain't a very likely place for you and I to meet; Watching the snow swirl around your hair and around your feet; And I'm thinking to myself 'she surely looks a treat'

== Recording and release ==
Recording continued at Jagger's home in Newbury with the use of the Rolling Stones Mobile Studio and finished at Island Recording Studios in London. Jagger, Richards and Mick Taylor each perform acoustic guitar for the piece. Richards also contributes electric slide guitar to the recording. Nicky Hopkins performs the song's piano. Bill Wyman performs bass while Charlie Watts performs drums.

An overlooked song from the Stones canon of work, "Till the Next Goodbye" has never been performed live by the Stones and was not included on any compilation albums until the release of the Heartbreak EP in early 2021.

The song was rehearsed on 11 February 2014 in Paris, in preparation for the Rolling Stones 14 On Fire Asia Pacific Tour, which started in Abu Dhabi on 21 February 2014. In attendance was special guest Mick Taylor.

== Critical reception ==
In his review of the song, Bill Janovitz says, "In the mid-'70s, a 42nd Street movie theater would have been a place of questionable repute and not a very romantic rendezvous. The lyric is unexpectedly complex; the point of view, Jagger as narrator, speaks to the mistress apologetically and with a guilty conscience... In one line on the bridge, Jagger manages to convey empathy, culpability, and frustration: 'I can't go on like this/Can you? Can you?' On paper it seems clear, the narrator is asking out of the relationship (paraphrasing): 'I can't do this, can you?' But the way Jagger sings it, it sounds like he's asking, 'You can't do this anymore, can you?' He's conveying a different meaning altogether, almost as if he is playing both parts in one line."

In a period review, Rolling Stone's Jon Landau considered the song "almost poignant", noting how it "conveys [Jagger's] desperation by simply saying, 'I can't go on like this,' while the band smolders beneath him." This view was shared by Ernie Santosuosso, who wrote for The Boston Globe that the track was "one of the rare ballads", which cast Jagger "as a romantic"; Santosuosso also noted how the lyrics rest "upon a comfortable cushion of acoustic guitars and Nicky Hopkins's piano." Bill Provick of The Ottawa Citizen considered "Till The Next Goodbye" to be one of the album's two best tracks, noting how its acoustic number was "captivating with a charming blend of guitar, piano and percussion, plus Jagger's evocative vocals." Jack Lloyd of Knight Newspapers considered the track to be a "first-rate example of what the Stones can do when they are in top form."

In a retrospective review, Vulture's David Marchese ranked the song as the 189th best Rolling Stones song and called it "a fine attempt to repeat the country-ballad magic of "Wild Horses" ".

== Personnel ==
According to authors Philippe Margotin and Jean-Michel Guesdon's book The Rolling Stones All the Songs, except where noted:

The Rolling Stones

- Mick Jagger – lead vocals; acoustic guitar; writer
- Keith Richards – backing vocals; slide guitar (Note: The authors added a question mark after Richards' guitar contribution.); writer
- Mick Taylor – 12-string acoustic guitar (Note: The authors added a question mark after Taylor's guitar contribution as they were not sure the specific instrument.)
- Bill Wyman – bass
- Charlie Watts – drums

Additional musicians and production

- Nicky Hopkins – piano
- The Glimmer Twins – producer
- Andy Johns – sound engineer
- Keith Harwood – sound engineer
- George Chkiantz – sound engineer
- Tapani Tapanainen – assistant sound engineer
- Rod Thear – assistant sound engineer
- Howard Kilgour – assistant sound engineer
- Reinhold Mack – assistant sound engineer

Studio locations

- Musicland Studios, Munich (14-25 November 1973)
- Rolling Stones Mobile Studio, Stargroves (Newbury; 12 April-2 May 1974)
- Island Studios (London; 5-27 May 1974)
