= Dance Little Sister (Rolling Stones song) =

Single by the Rolling Stones

from the album It's Only Rock 'n Roll
- A-side: "Ain't Too Proud to Beg"
- Released: 25 October 1974
- Recorded: 20 February–May 1974
- Genre: Rock
- Length: 4:11
- Label: Rolling Stones
- Songwriter: Jagger–Richards
- Producer: The Glimmer Twins

The Rolling Stones singles chronology
"Ain't Too Proud to Beg" (1974)	"Dance Little Sister" (1974)	"I Don't Know Why" (1975)

"Dance Little Sister" is a song written by Mick Jagger and Keith Richards that was first released on the Rolling Stones' twelfth studio album It's Only Rock 'n Roll (1974). It was also released as the B-side of the Rolling Stones single "Ain't Too Proud to Beg" and on several of their compilation albums.

== Lyrics and music ==
The lyrics to "Dance Little Sister" have lead singer Jagger asking women in high heels and tight skirts to dance for him all night. Some of the lyrics refer to Mick and Bianca Jagger spending days in Trinidad watching cricket and spending the nights partying. These include:

On Saturday night we don't go home
We bacchanal, ain't no dawn

"Dance Little Sister" is driven by the guitars, and according to author Steve Appleford, Richards' "savage" rhythm guitar in particular. Appleford also credits some "excitable" lead guitar passages from Mick Taylor, "fierce" drumming from Charlie Watts and a "rolling bar room piano" part by Ian Stewart. Music critic Bill Janovitz describes it as "a nihilistic dance number", comparing its "world-negating ass-shaking, insistent rock 'n' roll beat" to the disco music which would emerge shortly after its release. According to music journalist James Hector, "Dance Little Sister" is a return to the type of "bar-room crowd pleasers" that the group used to record in the mid-1960s.

== Critical reception ==
AllMusic critic Stephen Thomas Erlewine called it a "sharp, hard-driving album track" and "agreeable filler". But Appleford notes that while the song has "all the elements needed for the best kind of devil's music", the song "never fully erupts" or "clicks into a perfect groove". Hector describes the song's beginning, where "the guitar and drums struggle to find the exact groove" as precious, but feels the song goes "downhill" afterwards. Sean Egan finds the "industrial strength riff" to be "unattractive" and the rhythm to be "leaden".

Subsequent to its initial release on It's Only Rock 'n Roll, "Dance Little Sister" was released as the B-side of the "Ain't Too Proud to Beg" single in October 1974. Rolling Stones biographer Martin Elliott has stated that this deserved to be a double A-side release, as both songs are "foot-tapping dance-oriented numbers". It has also been released on several of the Rolling Stones compilation albums, including Made in the Shade in 1975, Singles 1971–2006 in 2011 and the Super Deluxe (80 track) version of GRRR! in 2012.

"Dance Little Sister" was occasionally included in the Rolling Stones' live sets during 1975 and 1977.
