= List of Canadian number-one albums of 1971 =

This article lists the Canadian number-one albums of 1971. The chart was compiled and published by RPM every Saturday.

The top position (December 26, 1970, Vol. 14, No. 19) preceding January 9, 1971 (Vol. 14, No. 20-21) was George Harrison's All Things Must Pass. Five acts held the top position in the albums and singles charts simultaneously: George Harrison on January 9 – 16, The Rolling Stones on June 12 – 19, Carole King on July 10 – 24, Paul and Linda McCartney on September 18 and Rod Stewart on October 9. The eponymous Santana album, often referred to as Santana III to avoid confusion with their likewise eponymous debut album, was listed as New Santana.)

Issue date	Album	Artist
January 2	All Things Must Pass	George Harrison
January 9	All Things Must Pass	George Harrison
January 16	All Things Must Pass	George Harrison
January 23	All Things Must Pass	George Harrison
January 30	All Things Must Pass	George Harrison
February 6	All Things Must Pass	George Harrison
February 13	All Things Must Pass	George Harrison
February 20	All Things Must Pass	George Harrison
February 27	All Things Must Pass	George Harrison
March 5	Jesus Christ Superstar	Original Cast
March 13	Pearl	Janis Joplin
March 20	Pearl	Janis Joplin
March 27	Pearl	Janis Joplin
April 3	Pearl	Janis Joplin
April 10*	Pearl	Janis Joplin
April 17	Pearl	Janis Joplin
April 24	Pearl	Janis Joplin
May 1	Pearl	Janis Joplin
May 8	Love Story	Original Soundtrack
May 15	Up to Date	The Partridge Family
May 22	Up to Date	The Partridge Family
May 29	Jesus Christ Superstar	Original Cast
June 5	Jesus Christ Superstar	Original Cast
June 12	Sticky Fingers	The Rolling Stones
June 18	Sticky Fingers	The Rolling Stones
June 26	Sticky Fingers	The Rolling Stones
July 3	Tapestry	Carole King
July 10	Tapestry	Carole King
July 17	Tapestry	Carole King
July 24	Tapestry	Carole King
July 31	Tapestry	Carole King
August 7	Tapestry	Carole King
August 14	Sticky Fingers	The Rolling Stones
August 21	Sticky Fingers	The Rolling Stones
August 28	Tapestry	Carole King
September 4	Tapestry	Carole King
September 11	Ram	Paul and Linda McCartney
September 18	Ram	Paul and Linda McCartney
September 25	Every Picture Tells a Story	Rod Stewart
October 2	Every Picture Tells a Story	Rod Stewart
October 9	Every Picture Tells a Story	Rod Stewart
October 16	Every Picture Tells a Story	Rod Stewart
October 23	Every Picture Tells a Story	Rod Stewart
October 30	Every Picture Tells a Story	Rod Stewart
November 6	Every Picture Tells a Story	Rod Stewart
November 13	Every Picture Tells a Story	Rod Stewart
November 20	Every Picture Tells a Story	Rod Stewart
November 27	Santana (III)	Santana
December 4	Santana (III)	Santana
December 11	Santana (III)	Santana
December 18	Santana (III)	Santana
December 25	Santana (III)	Santana

== See also ==
- 1971 in music
- RPM number-one hits of 1971
