= Moonlight Mile (song) =

1971 Rolling Stones song

Song by the Rolling Stones

from the album Sticky Fingers
- Released: 23 April 1971
- Recorded: October 1970
- Genre: Rock; soul
- Length: 5:56
- Label: Rolling Stones/Virgin
- Songwriter: Jagger/Richards
- Producer: Jimmy Miller

"Moonlight Mile" is a song recorded by the Rolling Stones. Credited to Jagger-Richards, it was written by Mick Jagger with assistance from Mick Taylor. It appears as the closing track on their 1971 album Sticky Fingers. The song features multiple musicians playing alternate instruments due to the frequent absence of Richards during recording sessions of the period.

"Moonlight Mile" has been largely considered an under-appreciated work of the band, with music critics Bill Janovitz and Robert Christgau praising the track's composition.

== Recording and composition ==
"Moonlight Mile" was the last song recorded for Sticky Fingers. Recording took place during the end of October 1970 at Stargroves. The song was the product of an all-night session between Jagger and guitarist Mick Taylor. Taylor had taken a short guitar piece recorded by Jagger (entitled "Japanese Thing") and reworked it for the session. Jagger performs the song's prominent acoustic guitar riff. Jagger felt it easier to extemporize with Taylor, as Richards was not present. It was Jagger's idea to add a string arrangement by Paul Buckmaster to the song. Jim Price—the Rolling Stones' usual trumpeter—plays piano. Taylor claims he was promised some songwriting credit, but found himself surprised that he did not receive one when the song was released on Sticky Fingers. Richards and Jagger took credit for the song.

"Moonlight Mile was all Mick's. As far as I can remember, Mick came in with the whole idea of that, and the band just figured out how to play it. - Keith Richards, Life (2010 book)

The song was written while the Rolling Stones were on their 1970 European tour. Reportedly a rough time for the band, Jagger was particularly affected the most by the alienation and fatigue of touring. The lyrics are elliptical and mysterious, but touch on the alienation of life on the road:

The sound of strangers sending nothing to my mind
Just another mad mad day on the road
I am just living to be lying by your side
But I'm just about a moonlight mile on down the road

== Reception ==
Many consider "Moonlight Mile" one of the Rolling Stones' most under-appreciated ballads. In a review of the song, Bill Janovitz says, "Though the song still referenced drugs and the road life of a pop-music celebrity, it really is a rare example of Jagger letting go of his public persona, offering a behind-the-scenes glimpse of the weariness that accompanies the pressures of keeping up appearances as a sex-drugs-and-rock & roll star."

Rock critic Robert Christgau said the song, "re-created all the paradoxical distances inherent in erotic love with a power worthy of Yeats, yet could also be interpreted as a cocaine song." This is a reference to the first stanza, which includes, "When the wind blows and the rain feels cold, With a head full of snow". It was meant to be about coming down from a cocaine high. However, Mick Jagger later dismissed any suggestions of the song being an allegory for drug use, and stated "The feeling I had at that moment was how difficult it was to be touring and how I wasn’t looking forward to going out and doing it again. It’s a very lonely thing, and my lyrics reflected that".

Writing for Slate, pop critic Jack Hamilton praised the track, referring to it as Sticky Fingers' "strangest and most unique recording" that is "an intoxicating mix of exotic and intimate".

Classic Rock History critic Matthew Pollard rated it as the Rolling Stones' best deep cut, calling it an "epic in every way imaginable" and saying that "the vibe gives off such a Winter atmosphere" but "once the song accretes towards the climactic ending, it absolutely explodes into something so tearfully optimistic that it sends the body into goosebumps."

== Personnel ==
- Mick Jagger – acoustic guitar, vocals
- Mick Taylor – electric lead guitar
- Bill Wyman – bass guitar
- Charlie Watts – drums
- Jim Price – piano
- Paul Buckmaster – string arrangement
