= It's Only Rock 'n Roll =

Studio album by the Rolling Stones
- Released: 18 October 1974
- Recorded: During 12–24 November 1973; 8–13 February and 20 February – 3 March 1974
- Studios: Musicland (Munich); Stargroves (Newbury); Island (London)
- Genres: Rock and roll; hard rock; blues rock; funk rock; reggae rock
- Length: 48:26
- Label: Rolling Stones
- Producer: The Glimmer Twins

The Rolling Stones chronology
Goats Head Soup (1973)	It's Only Rock 'n Roll (1974)	Made in the Shade (1975)

The Rolling Stones studio album chronology
Goats Head Soup (1973)	It's Only Rock 'n Roll (1974)	Black and Blue (1976)

Singles from It's Only Rock 'n Roll
- 1. "It's Only Rock 'n Roll (But I Like It)" Released: 26 July 1974; 2. "Ain't Too Proud to Beg" Released: 25 October 1974

It's Only Rock 'n Roll is the twelfth studio album by the English rock band the Rolling Stones, released on 18 October 1974 by Rolling Stones Records. It was the last album to feature guitarist Mick Taylor; the songwriting and recording of the album's title track had a connection to Taylor's eventual replacement, Ronnie Wood. It's Only Rock 'n Roll combines the core blues and rock 'n' roll–oriented sound with elements of funk and reggae. It's Only Rock 'n Roll reached number one in the United States and number two in the UK.

Though it was not as successful as their prior albums, It's Only Rock 'n Roll was an important transitional album for the Rolling Stones. Following the departure of long-time producer Jimmy Miller, the album was self-produced by guitarist Keith Richards and singer Mick Jagger under the pseudonym "The Glimmer Twins". Taylor, bassist Bill Wyman and drummer Charlie Watts played on most of the tracks, while frequent collaborators Ian Stewart, Nicky Hopkins, and Billy Preston contributed additional instrumentation. The album featured the first appearance of percussionist Ray Cooper of the Elton John Band, who would continue to work with the Rolling Stones into the 1980s.

The title track was recorded separately from the rest of the album. The basic rhythm track had been laid down by members of the Faces, including Wood and drummer Kenney Jones, during a jam session with Jagger, David Bowie, and bassist Willie Weeks. Jagger liked the song so much that he brought the basic track to Richards, who added some guitar overdubs, and after some polishing, it was put on the album as-is. In 1975, the band began auditioning guitarists including Jeff Beck, Wayne Perkins, Harvey Mandel, Rory Gallagher and Steve Marriott as possible replacements after the departure of Taylor, while recording the next studio album, Black and Blue (1976).

== History ==
Work began on It's Only Rock 'n Roll following the Rolling Stones' autumn 1973 European tour. Production began in November at Munich, Germany's Musicland Studios. According to guitarist Keith Richards, "We were really hot (off the road) and ready just to play some new material." The recording sessions were attended by Belgian painter Guy Peellaert, who Mick Jagger invited to do the album cover after seeing his work in the book Rock Dreams, which featured illustrations of various rock musicians such as the Rolling Stones. Peellaert eventually painted the band as "rock deities", descending a temple staircase, surrounded by young girls and women worshiping them in Grecian clothing. The cover bears a very strong resemblance to Henri Gervex's painting, The Coronation of Nicolas II (1896). The artist refused to sign a deal of exclusivity, and in 1974 provided the album art for David Bowie's Diamond Dogs.

=== Recording ===
The album was at first developed as a half-live, half-studio production with one side of the album featuring live performances from the Stones' European tour while the other side was to be composed of newly recorded cover versions of the band's favourite R&B songs. Covers recorded included a take of Dobie Gray's "Drift Away", Jimmy Reed's "Shame Shame Shame", and the Temptations' "Ain't Too Proud to Beg". Soon the band began working off riffs by Richards and new ideas by Mick Jagger and the original concept was scrapped in favour of an album with all-new material. The cover of "Ain't Too Proud to Beg" was the only recording to make the cut, while the "Drift Away" cover is a popular bootleg.

It's Only Rock 'n Roll marked the Stones' first effort in the producer's chair since Their Satanic Majesties Request, and the first for Jagger and Richards under their pseudonym "The Glimmer Twins". On the choice to produce, Richards said at the time:

I think we'd come to a point with Jimmy (Miller) where the contribution level had dropped because it'd got to be a habit, a way of life, for Jimmy to do one Stones album a year. He'd got over the initial sort of excitement which you can feel on Beggars Banquet and Let It Bleed. Also, Mick and I felt that we wanted to try and do it ourselves because we really felt we knew much more about techniques and recording and had our own ideas of how we wanted things to go. Goats Head Soup hadn't turned out as we wanted to – not blaming Jimmy or anything like that... But it was obvious that it was time for a change in that particular part of the process of making records.

Starting with this release, all future Rolling Stones albums would either be produced by themselves or in collaboration with an outside producer.

Most of the album's backing tracks were recorded first at Musicland; solo vocals were recorded later by Jagger, about whom Richards would say, "he often comes up with his best stuff alone in the studio with just an engineer."

The song "Luxury" showed the band's growing interest in reggae music, while "Till the Next Goodbye" and "If You Really Want to Be My Friend" continued their immersion in ballads. Seven of the album's 10 songs crack the four-minute mark, a feature that would come to be disparaged during the rising punk rock scene of the late 1970s.

Ronnie Wood, a long-time acquaintance of the band, began to get closer to the Rolling Stones during these sessions after he invited Mick Taylor to play on his debut album, I've Got My Own Album to Do. Taylor spent some time recording and hanging out at Wood's house, The Wick. By chance, Richards was asked one night by Wood's wife at the time, Krissy, to join them at the guitarist's home. While there, Richards recorded some tracks with Wood and quickly developed a close friendship, with Richards going as far as moving into Wood's guest room. Jagger soon entered the mix and it was here that the album's lead single and title track, "It's Only Rock 'n Roll (But I Like It)", was first recorded. Wood worked closely on the track with Jagger, who subsequently took the song and title for their album. The released version of this song features Wood on 12-string acoustic guitar.

It's Only Rock 'n Roll was Mick Taylor's last album with the Rolling Stones. Similar to receiving no writing credits on the Stones' previous album, Goats Head Soup, Taylor reportedly had made songwriting contributions to "Till the Next Goodbye" and "Time Waits for No One", but on the album jacket, all original songs were credited to Jagger/Richards. Taylor said in 1997:

I did have a falling out with Mick Jagger over some songs I felt I should have been credited with co-writing on It's Only Rock 'n Roll. We were quite close friends and co-operated quite closely on getting that album made. By that time Mick and Keith weren't really working together as a team so I'd spend a lot of time in the studio.

Taylor's statement contradicts Jagger's earlier comment concerning the album. Jagger stated in a 1995 Rolling Stone interview about "Time Waits for No One" that Taylor "maybe threw in a couple of chords".

Alongside the usual outside contributors, namely Billy Preston, Nicky Hopkins and unofficial member Ian Stewart, Elton John sideman Ray Cooper acted as percussionist for the album. Several songs were finished songs and overdubs and mixing were performed at Jagger's home, Stargroves, in the early summer of 1974.

== Release ==
The lead single, "It's Only Rock 'n Roll (But I Like It)", was released by Rolling Stones Records on 26 July 1974, with the catalogue number RS 19114 and "Through the Lonely Nights" as the B-side. Despite the familiar sound, it surprised many by failing to reach the top 10 in the United States (although it did reach the top 10 in the UK). With its sing-along chorus, it has become a staple at Rolling Stones concerts. The B-side "Through the Lonely Nights" (later included on the album Rarities 1971–2003) dates back to the previous year's Goats Head Soup sessions as well as the track "Short and Curlies". It's Only Rock 'n Roll appeared three months later on 18 October 1974, with the catalogue number COC 59103. The band's cover of "Ain't Too Proud to Beg" was released as the second single in the United States only, with the catalogue number RS-19302 and "Dance Little Sister" as the B-side; it also became a top 20 hit. Its parent album appeared in October with brisk initial sales, reaching number two in the UK (breaking a string of number-one albums that stretched back to 1969's Let It Bleed) and number one in the United States, where it eventually went platinum.

Instead of immediately touring to promote the album, the band decided to head back into the Munich studios to record the next album, to Taylor's disappointment and subsequent resignation from the band. A tour didn't happen until the following summer in the United States, the ‘Tour of the Americas '75’, with future member Ronnie Wood taking Taylor's place on guitar.

The title track became a permanent staple of the band's live setlist, but apart from some performances of "Ain’t Too Proud to Beg" and "If You Can’t Rock Me" on the Licks Tour, none of the other tracks have been performed since 1977. As of 2023, "Till The Next Goodbye", "Time Waits For No-One", "If You Really Want To Be My Friend" and "Short and Curlies" had never been played live.

In order to promote the album, music videos were filmed for several of the songs. The most commonly seen video from the album was the one for "It’s Only Rock’n’Roll (But I Like It)", featuring the band (in US Navy sailor suits) playing in a tent, which gradually fills with soap bubbles (Taylor, Watts and Wyman are all featured in the video but did not play on the actual recording). Videos were also filmed for "Ain’t Too Proud to Beg" and "Till The Next Goodbye".

== Critical reception ==
Professional ratings
Review scores
Source	Rating
AllMusic	3.5/5 stars
Christgau's Record Guide	B
The Great Rock Discography	6/10
MusicHound	3/5 stars
NME	6/10
The Rolling Stone Album Guide	2.5/5 stars
Tom Hull	B+
The Encyclopedia of Popular Music	2/5 stars

Initial reviews for It's Only Rock 'n Roll were mixed. Rolling Stone's Jon Landau called It's Only Rock 'n Roll "one of the most intriguing and mysterious, as well as the darkest, of all Rolling Stones records." Rock critic Lester Bangs disparaged the album in The Village Voice, much like Goats Head Soup, saying, "The Stones have become oblique in their old age, which is just another word for perverse except that perverse is the corniest concept extant as they realized at inception... Soup was friendly and safe. I want the edge and this album doesn't reassure me that I'll get it, what a curious situation to be stuck in, but maybe that's the beauty of the Stones, hah, hah, kid? This album is false. Numb. But it cuts like a dull blade. Are they doing the cutting, or are we?" Arthur Levy of Zoo World also gave a mixed assessment. While he enjoyed the album more with each listen, he felt it was mixed poorly and that certain tracks, such as "'Till the Next Goodbye" and "Time Waits for No One", were evidence that the band were starting to feel the effects the last couple of years had on their music. Numerous reviewers felt the closing track, "Fingerprint File", was stylistically different from the rest of the album and didn't belong.

On the other side, NME voted the album as the second best album of the year. When comparing the album to its predecessor, John Morthland of Creem gave It's Only Rock 'n Roll a positive review, calling it one of the best albums of the year. Although he called the title track "lame", he considered the songs and the band's performance significantly better than Goats Head Soup, writing, "they sound like a band of interacting members playing songs that they care about, rather than faceless session men layin' down some tracks". Similarly, Greg Shaw of Phonograph Record considered the record to be better than its predecessor, but felt there was a pervading "nonchalance" throughout the album: "A certain amount of thought and care is put into each song, but not enough to weight it down or divert anyone's attention from the groove." However, Shaw writes that the album as a whole is cohesive, ultimately calling it "the best party album in years".

Retrospectively, Stephen Thomas Erlewine of AllMusic felt the record was uneven, but overall considered the songs and performances an improvement over Goats Head Soup. In 2020, Steve Sutherland of Hi-Fi News similarly called the album the band's "riposte" but agreed its overall quality lacked cohesiveness.

== Legacy ==
Author James Hector added that It's Only Rock 'n Roll was a definitive turning point for the band. "The album marked the band’s decisive entry into a comfortable living as rock's elder statesmen. From this point on, their youth culture importance vanished, and there would be few musical surprises in the future." Hector concluded with "On It's Only Rock 'n Roll, the band had become what they imagined their mass audience desired them to be. They were wrong."

In 1994, It's Only Rock 'n Roll was remastered and reissued by Virgin Records, in 2009 by Universal Music, and once more in 2011 by Universal Music Enterprises in a Japanese-only SHM-SACD version. The 1994 remaster was initially released in a Collector's Edition CD, which replicated in miniature elements of the original vinyl album packaging.

Two different versions of "Luxury" exist. A shorter version (4:30) is included on the early CD version from 1986, while the 5:01 version was originally released on vinyl in Europe, and on the 1994 and 2009 CD remasters. The difference is the shorter version starts the fadeout 30 seconds earlier, and thereby missing the short guitar solo at the end.

== Track listing ==
All tracks are written by Mick Jagger and Keith Richards, except "Ain't Too Proud to Beg" by Norman Whitfield and Eddie Holland.

Side one
No.	Title	Length
1.	"If You Can't Rock Me"	3:47
2.	"Ain't Too Proud to Beg"	3:32
3.	"It's Only Rock 'n Roll (But I Like It)" (inspiration by Ronnie Wood)	5:08
4.	"Till the Next Goodbye"	4:39
5.	"Time Waits for No One"	6:31
Total length:		23:37

Side two
No.	Title	Length
1.	"Luxury"	5:02
2.	"Dance Little Sister"	4:12
3.	"If You Really Want to Be My Friend"	6:17
4.	"Short and Curlies"	2:44
5.	"Fingerprint File"	6:41
Total length:		24:56

== Personnel ==
- Track numbers noted in parentheses below are based on the CD track numbering.

The Rolling Stones

- Mick Jagger – lead vocals (all tracks), backing vocals (1–6, 9), acoustic guitar (4), electric guitar (10)
- Keith Richards – electric guitar (all including slide on 4), backing vocals (1–6, 8–9), acoustic guitar (4, 8), bass guitar (1)
- Mick Taylor – electric guitar (1, 5, 7–9), acoustic guitar (4–5), backing vocals, synthesizer (5), congas (7), bass guitar (10)
- Bill Wyman – bass guitar (2, 4–9), synthesiser (10)
- Charlie Watts – drums (all but 3)

Additional personnel

- Nicky Hopkins – piano (4–6, 8, 10)
- Billy Preston – piano (1–2, 10), clavinet (2, 10)
- Ian Stewart – piano (3, 7, 9)
- Ray Cooper – percussion (1–2, 5–6)
- Blue Magic – backing vocals (8)
- Charlie Jolly – tabla (10)
- Ed Leach – cowbell (2)

Basic track on "It's Only Rock 'n Roll (But I Like It)"

- Kenney Jones – drums
- Willie Weeks – bass guitar
- David Bowie – backing vocals
- Ronnie Wood – twelve–string acoustic guitar, backing vocals

Production

- Andy Johns – recording engineer
- Keith Harwood – recording engineer, mixing
- George Chkiantz – overdub engineer
- Glyn Johns – mixing (on "Fingerprint File")
- Guy Peellaert – cover art design and painting
- Bob Ludwig – 1994 remastering

== Charts ==
Weekly chart performance for It's Only Rock 'n Roll
Chart (1974–1975)	Peak position
Australian Albums (Kent Music Report)	7
Austrian Albums (Ö3 Austria)	6
Canada Top Albums/CDs (RPM)	5
Dutch Albums (Album Top 100)	5
Finland (The Official Finnish Charts)	9
German Albums (Offizielle Top 100)	12
Italian Albums (Musica e Dischi)	6
Japanese Albums (Oricon)	29
Norwegian Albums (VG-lista)	3
Sweden (Kvällstoppen)	3
UK Albums (Official Charts)	2
US Billboard 200	1

== Certifications ==
Certifications for It's Only Rock 'n Roll
Region	Certification	Certified units/sales
Canada (Music Canada)	Platinum	100,000^{^}
France (SNEP)	Gold	100,000^{*}
United Kingdom (BPI)	Gold	100,000^{^}
United States (RIAA)	Platinum	1,000,000^{^}
^{*} Sales figures based on certification alone.^{^} Shipments figures based on certification alone.
