= Stargroves =

English manor house and estate

Coordinates: 51.347°N 1.411°W

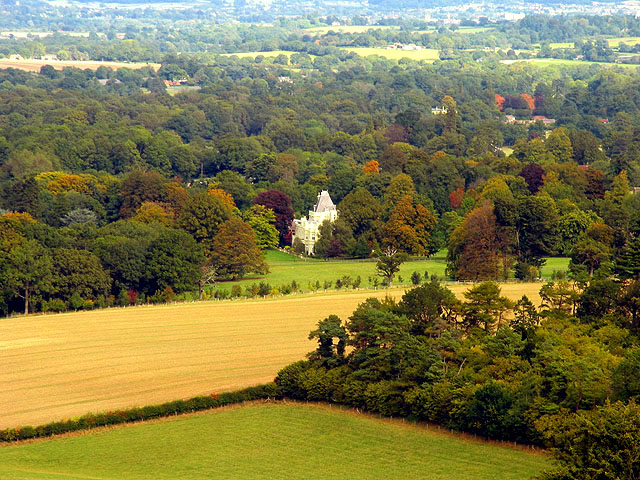
A distant view of Stargroves

Stargroves (also known as Stargrove House) is a manor house and associated estate at East Woodhay in the English county of Hampshire. The house belonged to Mick Jagger during the 1970s and was a recording venue for the Rolling Stones and various other rock bands, as well as a filming location for Doctor Who.

== History ==
The Goddard family owned the estate from 1565 until about 1830. Oliver Cromwell stopped at Stargroves after the second battle of Newbury (27 October 1644), and was entertained by the owner, John Goddard. Edward Goddard owned the estate from 1778 to 1788. It was also owned by Capt. Sir F. H. W. Carden, 3rd Baronet.

In the early 1840s, Stargrove House was destroyed by a fire. Around 1848 a new manor house was built, designed in an ornate, Victorian Gothic style in the manner of a French château. The new house was bought by a Captain Ramsay, and in 1879 was sold to Sir Frederick Henry Walter Carden, who made alterations to the house and landscaped the park.

Stargroves is noted for its revivalist architectural features such as castellations, corner turrets and Tudor Revival windows. Today, Stargrove House is a Grade II listed building.

=== 1970s ===
Mick Jagger purchased the estate in 1970 for £55,000 from Sir Henry Carden.

The Rolling Stones recorded at Stargroves before their move to France in spring 1971. These recordings were laid down via a mobile recording studio control room in a custom-built truck known as the Rolling Stones Mobile Studio. The band recorded a number of albums and singles at Stargroves, including various tracks that appeared on Sticky Fingers, Exile on Main St., and It's Only Rock 'n Roll.

Other notable musical acts also recorded at Stargroves using the mobile studio. The Who recorded songs such as "Won't Get Fooled Again" and "Pure and Easy" in 1971. In 1972, Led Zeppelin recorded songs that later appeared on the albums Houses of the Holy (1973), Physical Graffiti (1975) and Coda (1982).

In the 1970s, Sir Mark Palmer and his band of wealthy New Age travellers and their horse-drawn caravans spent much time at Stargroves.

The house's exterior and its grounds were extensively used for filming the Doctor Who serials Pyramids of Mars (1975) and Image of the Fendahl (1977) from Tom Baker's era as the Fourth Doctor.

=== Later owners ===
Jagger sold Stargroves in 1979, for £200,000, to Boxford businessman John Varley. It was then bought by Swedish businessman, Claes Bourghardt, in 1984, for £525,000. He sold it in 1988 to Paul Dupee Jr, the owner of the Boston Celtics, for £2,250,000. He sold it in 1993 after having created a basketball court and expansive gardens.

In 1998, Rod Stewart bought Stargroves for £2.5 million from Frank Williams but never moved in. He separated from his then wife, Rachel Hunter, soon after exchanging contracts and sold it. In 2012, Stargroves was sold for more than its £15 million listing price to a member of the Sackler family.
