= Sticky Fingers =

Studio album by the Rolling Stones
- Released: 23 April 1971
- Recorded: 22–31 March 1969; 2–4 December 1969; 17 February – 31 October 1970
- Studios: Muscle Shoals Sound (Alabama); Olympic and Trident (London); Stargroves (Newbury)
- Genres: Hard rock; roots rock; rock and roll
- Length: 46:25
- Label: Rolling Stones
- Producer: Jimmy Miller

The Rolling Stones chronology
Get Yer Ya-Ya's Out! (1970)	Sticky Fingers (1971)	Exile on Main St. (1972)

The Rolling Stones studio album chronology
Let It Bleed (1969)	Sticky Fingers (1971)	Exile on Main St. (1972)

Alternative cover
- Spanish cover

Singles from Sticky Fingers
- 1. "Brown Sugar" / "Bitch" Released: 16 April 1971; 2. "Wild Horses" / "Sway" Released: 12 June 1971

Sticky Fingers is the ninth studio album by the English rock band the Rolling Stones. It was released on 23 April 1971 on the Rolling Stones' new label, Rolling Stones Records.

The Rolling Stones had been contracted by Decca Records and London Records in the UK and the US since 1963. On this album, Mick Taylor made his second full-length appearance on a Rolling Stones album (after the live album Get Yer Ya-Ya's Out!). It was the first studio album without Brian Jones, who had died two years earlier. The original Grammy-nominated cover artwork, conceived and photographed by Andy Warhol, showed a picture of a man in tight jeans, and had a working zipper and perforated cover that enabled revealing a man in full-rise briefs. The cover was expensive to produce and damaged the vinyl record, so the size of the zipper adjustment was made by John Kosh at ABKCO Records. Later re-issues featured just the outer photograph of the jeans.

The album featured a return to basics for the Rolling Stones. The unusual instrumentation introduced several albums prior was absent, with most songs featuring drums, guitar, bass, and percussion as provided by the key members: Mick Jagger (lead vocals, various percussion and rhythm guitar), Keith Richards (guitar and backing vocals), Mick Taylor (guitar), Bill Wyman (bass guitar), and Charlie Watts (drums). Additional contributions were made by long-time Stones collaborators including saxophonist Bobby Keys and keyboardists Billy Preston, Jack Nitzsche, Ian Stewart, and Nicky Hopkins. As with the other albums of the Rolling Stones late 1960s/early 1970s period, it was produced by Jimmy Miller.

Sticky Fingers is widely regarded as one of the Rolling Stones' best albums. It was the band's first album to reach number one on both the UK albums and US albums charts, and has since achieved triple platinum certification in the US. "Brown Sugar" topped the Billboard Hot 100 in 1971. Sticky Fingers was voted the second best album of the year in The Village Voice's annual Pazz & Jop critics poll for 1971, based on American critics' votes. The album was inducted into the Grammy Hall of Fame and included in Rolling Stone magazine's "The 500 Greatest Albums of All Time" list.

== Background ==
With the end of their Decca/London association at hand, the Rolling Stones were finally free to release their albums (including cover art) as they pleased. However, their departing manager Allen Klein dealt the group a major blow when they discovered that they had inadvertently signed over their entire 1960s American copyrights to Klein and his company ABKCO, which is how all of their material from 1963's "Come On" to Get Yer Ya-Ya's Out! The Rolling Stones in Concert has since been released solely in America by ABKCO Records. The band later sued for their return but without success, settling in 1984. The band would remain incensed with Klein for decades for that act. Klein died in 2009.

When Decca informed the Rolling Stones that they were owed one more single, the band submitted a track called "Cocksucker Blues", correctly assuming that this would be refused. Instead, Decca released the two-year-old Beggars Banquet track "Street Fighting Man" while Klein retained dual copyright ownership in conjunction with the Rolling Stones of "Brown Sugar" and "Wild Horses".

=== Recording ===
Although sessions for Sticky Fingers began in earnest in March 1970, the Rolling Stones had been recording at Muscle Shoals Sound Studio in Alabama in December 1969, where they cut "You Gotta Move", "Brown Sugar" and "Wild Horses". "Sister Morphine", cut during Let It Bleed's sessions earlier in March of that year, had been held over from that release. Much of the recording for Sticky Fingers was made with the Rolling Stones' mobile studio in Stargroves during the summer and autumn of 1970. Early versions of songs that would eventually appear on Exile on Main St. were also rehearsed during these sessions.

== Music and lyrics ==
Sticky Fingers originally included 10 tracks. The music has been characterised by commentators as hard rock, roots rock and rock and roll. According to Rolling Stone magazine, it is "the Stones' most downbeat, druggy album, with new guitarist Mick Taylor stretching into jazz and country".

== Artwork ==
=== Standard version ===
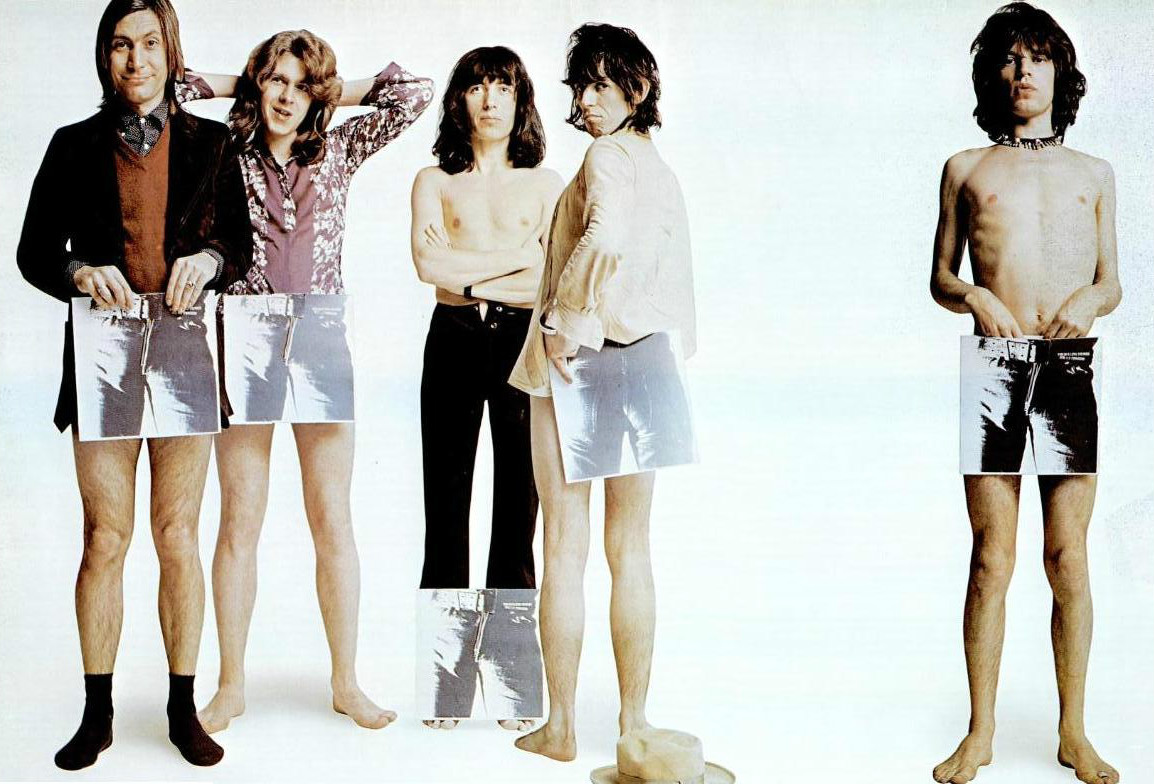
The Rolling Stones posing in an ad with covers of Sticky Fingers, with the original artwork, in 1971. Left to right: Charlie Watts, Mick Taylor, Bill Wyman, Keith Richards, Mick Jagger

The artwork emphasized the innuendo of the Sticky Fingers title, showing a close-up of a jeans-clad male crotch with the visible outline of a penis. The cover of the original vinyl LP featured a working zipper and perforations around the belt buckle that opened to reveal a sub-cover image of white briefs. The vinyl release displayed the band's name and album title along the belt; behind the zipper, the underpants were seemingly rubber stamped in gold with the stylized name of American pop artist Andy Warhol, below which read "THIS PHOTOGRAPH MAY NOT BE—ETC." The artwork was conceived and photographed by Warhol, and the design by Craig Braun. Billy Name is sometimes accredited as the photographer, however, Braun believes Warhol shot the Polaroid photos for the album, and the Factory associates who were involved in the photo shoot have claimed that Warhol took the photos. Braun and his team suggested wrapping the album in rolling paper – a concept later used by Cheech & Chong in Big Bambu – but Jagger was enthused by Warhol's concept. Warhol duly sent Braun Polaroid pictures of a model in tight jeans.

We manufactured those kind of one-off packages, because a lot of conventional record suppliers were a bit baffled as to how to make them. I'd already done a few of them for bands like The Temptations, The Supremes, Joe Cocker and a teen idol named Bobby Sherman, where a band would be selling in sufficient quantities – maybe a million-plus – to have a custom-made sleeve. So when there was a big act like the Stones, you knew the initial release would be a million-plus, and a custom package could be made without costing the label too much of a premium. So the Stones' managers came to me and asked what I could do.

— Craig Braun

Fans assumed the cover photo of the crotch to be Jagger, but he revealed that it was one of Warhol's "protégés". Jagger said it was Jay Johnson, but the general consensus is that Warhol used his lover Jed Johnson as the model for the cover. It remains uncertain exactly who appears on the cover because Warhol photographed several men and never publicly revealed which photos he used. Braun thought it was Jed Johnson on the cover, but he later said Warhol's business manager Fred Hughes told him it was makeup artist Corey Tippin, with which Tippin concurs, saying "I know my anatomy." Warhol superstar Joe Dallesandro also claimed to be the model on the cover, but Braun is sure it was not him.

Former Interview magazine editor Bob Colacello said, "When the album came out, Glenn [O'Brein] was certain that it was he on the inside and Jay Johnson on the outside, but Andy would never say exactly whose crotch he had immortalized." O'Brien, who was an editor for Warhol's Interview magazine, was "100 percent certain" he was the underwear model: "I knew it was me because it was my underwear!" O'Brien initially stated that Jed Johnson was the model for the cover, but he later claimed that it was Tippin. He added that Warhol might not even have known who he selected. "He probably took these Polaroids, put them on the table, and picked ones he liked. I don't think it mattered to him [who it was]," said O'Brien.

For the initial vinyl release, the album title and band name is smaller and at the top on the American release. For the UK release, the title and band name are in bigger letters and on the left. Reportedly, when retailers complained that the zipper damaged the vinyl (from stacked shipments), the zipper was "unzipped" slightly to the middle of the record, where damage would be minimized.

Sticky Fingers earned a Grammy nomination for Best Album Cover at the 14th Annual Grammy Awards in 1972.

The album introduced the tongue and lips logo of Rolling Stones Records, designed by John Pasche in 1970. Jagger suggested to Pasche that he copy the out-stuck tongue of the Hindu goddess Kali. Pasche felt that would date the image to the Indian culture craze of the 1960s, but seeing Kali changed his mind. Before the end of that year, his basic version was faxed to Craig Braun by Marshall Chess. The black and white copy was modified by Braun and his team, resulting in the popular red version: the slim one with the two white stripes on the tongue.

Critic Sean Egan wrote: "Without using the Stones' name, it instantly conjures them, or at least Jagger, as well as a certain lasciviousness that is the Stones' own... It quickly and deservedly became the most famous logo in the history of popular music." The tongue and lips design was part of a package that, in 2003, VH1 named the "No. 1 Greatest Album Cover" of all time.

=== Alternative version and covers ===
In Spain, the original cover was censored by the Franco regime and replaced with a "can of fingers" cover featuring a hand mostly submerged in a can of treacle, which was designed by John Pasche and Phil Jude, and "Sister Morphine" was replaced by a live version of Chuck Berry's "Let It Rock". This track was later included on the CD compilation Rarities 1971–2003 in 2005.

In 1992, the LP release of the album in Russia featured a similar treatment as the original cover; but with Cyrillic lettering for the band name and album name, a colourised photograph of blue jeans with a zipper, and a Soviet Army uniform belt buckle that shows a hammer and sickle inscribed in a star.

== Release and reception ==
Professional ratings
Retrospective reviews
Aggregate scores
Source	Rating
Metacritic	100/100 (deluxe edition)
Review scores
Source	Rating
AllMusic	5/5 stars
Christgau's Record Guide	A
Encyclopedia of Popular Music	4/5 stars
MusicHound Rock	4.5/5
NME	9/10
Pitchfork	10/10
Q	5/5 stars
Record Collector	5/5 stars
The Rolling Stone Album Guide	5/5 stars
Uncut	5/5 stars

Sticky Fingers was released on 23 April 1971 and reached number one on the UK Albums Chart in May 1971, remaining there for four weeks before returning at number one for a further week in mid June. In the US, the album hit number one within days of release, and stayed there for four weeks. The album spent a total of 69 weeks on the Billboard 200. According to Billboard's Top 200 list, it was one of the albums that topped the German chart that year.

In a contemporary review for the Los Angeles Times, music critic Robert Hilburn said that although Sticky Fingers is one of the best rock albums of the year, it is only "modest" by the Rolling Stones' standards and succeeds on the strength of songs such as "Bitch" and "Dead Flowers", which recall the band's previously uninhibited, furious style. Jon Landau, writing in Rolling Stone, felt that it lacks the spirit and spontaneity of the Rolling Stones' previous two albums and, apart from "Moonlight Mile", is full of "forced attempts at style and control" in which the band sounds disinterested, particularly on formally correct songs such as "Brown Sugar". Writing for Rolling Stone in 2015, David Fricke called it "an eclectic affirmation of maturing depth" and the band's "sayonara to a messy 1969". In a positive review, Lynn Van Matre of the Chicago Tribune viewed the album as the band "at their raunchy best" and wrote that, although it is "hardly innovative", it is consistent enough to be one of the year's best albums. Writing for Slate, Jack Hamilton praised the album in a retrospective review, stating that it was "one of the greatest albums in rock 'n' roll history."

Sticky Fingers was voted the second best album of the year in The Village Voice's annual Pazz & Jop critics poll for 1971. Lester Bangs voted it number one in the poll and said that it was his most played album of the year. Robert Christgau, the poll's creator, ranked the album 17th on his own year-end list. In a 1975 article for The Village Voice, Christgau suggested that the release was "triffling with decadence", but might be the Rolling Stones' best album, approached only by Exile on Main St. (1972). In Christgau's Record Guide: Rock Albums of the Seventies (1981), he wrote that it reflected how unapologetic the band was after the Altamont Free Concert and that, despite the concession to sincerity with "Wild Horses", songs such as "Can't You Hear Me Knocking" and "I Got the Blues" are as "soulful" as "Good Times", and their cover of "You Gotta Move" is on-par with their previous covers of "Prodigal Son" and "Love in Vain".

=== Re-releases ===
In 1994, Sticky Fingers was remastered and reissued by Virgin Records. This remaster was initially released in a Collector's Edition CD, which replicated in miniature many elements of the original vinyl album packaging, including the zipper. Sticky Fingers was remastered again in 2009 by Universal Music Enterprises and in 2011 by Universal Music Enterprises in a Japanese-only SHM-SACD version; the latter was also used in 2013 for SHM-CD and Platinum SHM-CD, and then again in 2020 for another Japanese-only (standard) SHM-CD version.

In June 2015, the Rolling Stones reissued Sticky Fingers in its 2009 remastering in a variety of formats to coincide with a concert tour, the Zip Code Tour. The Deluxe and Super Deluxe versions of the reissue featured previously unreleased bonus material (depending on the format): alternative takes of some songs, live tracks recorded on 14 March 1971 at the Roundhouse in London and the complete 13 March 1971 show at Leeds University. It re-entered the UK Albums chart at number 7, extending their UK Top 10 album chart span beyond 51 years and 2 months since their self-titled debuted at number 7 on 23 April 1964. It also re-entered the US Albums chart at number 5, extending their US Top 10 album chart span beyond 50 years and 6 months since 12 x 5 on 14 December 1964.

== Legacy ==
Sticky Fingers was ranked number ten in the 1994 first edition of Colin Larkin's All Time Top 1000 Albums. He stated, "Dirty rock like this has still to be bettered, and there is still no rival in sight." In a retrospective review, Q magazine said that the album was "the Stones at their assured, showboating peak ... A magic formula of heavy soul, junkie blues and macho rock." NME wrote that it "captures the Stones bluesy swagger" in a "dark-land where few dare to tread". Record Collector magazine said that it showcases Jagger and Richards as they "delve even further back to the primitive blues that first inspired them and step up their investigations into another great American form, country." In his review for Goldmine magazine, Dave Thompson wrote that the album still is superior to "most of The Rolling Stones' catalog". In a 2018 retrospective review, The Guardian's Alexis Petridis ranked it the best album the band had ever produced, stating "their claim to be The Greatest Rock’n’Roll Band in the World has no more compelling evidence than the flawless 46 minutes of music here."

David Hepworth wrote in his 2016 book Never a Dull Moment that the contributions of guest performers such as Keys, Jim Dickinson, and Preston gave the album "more musical range than any other Rolling Stones album", including "Dickinson's honky-tonk piano on 'Wild Horses'" and "Preston's churchy organ solo on 'I Got the Blues'". Hepworth also suggested that Taylor's "Latin-flavored guitar solo" on "Can't You Hear Me Knocking" was influenced by Santana's 1970 album Abraxas.

Sticky Fingers was inducted into the Grammy Hall of Fame in 1999. It was listed as No. 63 on Rolling Stone magazine's 2003 list of The 500 Greatest Albums of All Time, No. 64 in a 2012 revised list, and No. 104 in a 2020 reboot of the list.

== Track listing ==
All tracks are written by Mick Jagger and Keith Richards, except where noted.

Side one
No.	Title	Writer(s)	Length
1.	"Brown Sugar"		3:48
2.	"Sway"		3:50
3.	"Wild Horses"		5:42
4.	"Can't You Hear Me Knocking"		7:14
5.	"You Gotta Move"	Fred McDowell; Gary Davis	2:32

Side two
No.	Title	Writer(s)	Length
6.	"Bitch"		3:38
7.	"I Got the Blues"		3:54
8.	"Sister Morphine"	Jagger-Richards; Marianne Faithfull	5:31
9.	"Dead Flowers"		4:03
10.	"Moonlight Mile"		5:56

=== Deluxe edition (2015) ===
Disc two
No.	Title	Length
1.	"Brown Sugar" (Alternate Version with Eric Clapton)	4:07
2.	"Wild Horses" (Acoustic version)	5:47
3.	"Can't You Hear Me Knocking" (Alternate version)	3:24
4.	"Bitch" (Extended version)	5:53
5.	"Dead Flowers" (Alternate version)	4:18
6.	"Live with Me" (Live at the Roundhouse, 1971)	4:22
7.	"Stray Cat Blues" (Live at the Roundhouse, 1971)	3:38
8.	"Love in Vain" (Live at the Roundhouse, 1971)	6:42
9.	"Midnight Rambler" (Live at the Roundhouse, 1971)	11:27
10.	"Honky Tonk Women" (Live at the Roundhouse, 1971)	4:14

=== Super Deluxe edition (2015) ===
Disc three: Get Yer Leeds Lungs Out (Live at University of Leeds, 1971)
No.	Title	Length
1.	"Jumpin' Jack Flash"	3:59
2.	"Live with Me"	4:21
3.	"Dead Flowers"	4:02
4.	"Stray Cat Blues"	4:14
5.	"Love in Vain"	6:28
6.	"Midnight Rambler"	13:09
7.	"Bitch"	5:25
8.	"Honky Tonk Women"	3:20
9.	"(I Can't Get No) Satisfaction"	5:31
10.	"Little Queenie"	4:26
11.	"Brown Sugar"	4:44
12.	"Street Fighting Man"	4:52
13.	"Let It Rock"	3:14

== Personnel ==
- Track credits are noted in parentheses and based on CD numbering where the titles of the second side are numbered from 6 to 10.

The Rolling Stones

- Mick Jagger – lead vocals (all tracks), acoustic guitar (9–10), castanets (1), maracas (1), electric guitar (2)
- Keith Richards – electric guitar (1, 3–7, 9), acoustic guitar (1, 3, 5, 8–9), backing vocals (1–7, 9)
- Mick Taylor – electric guitar (1–2, 4–7, 9–10), acoustic guitar (3)
- Bill Wyman – bass (all but 5), electric piano (5)
- Charlie Watts – drums (all tracks)

Additional personnel

- Paul Buckmaster – string arrangement (2, 10)
- Ry Cooder – slide guitar (8)
- Jim Dickinson – piano (3)
- Rocky Dijon – congas (4)
- Nicky Hopkins – piano (2)
- Bobby Keys (credited as B. Keyes) – saxophone (1, 4, 6–7)
- Jimmy Miller – percussion (4, 6)
- Jack Nitzsche – piano (8)
- Billy Preston – organ (4, 7)
- Jim Price – trumpet (6–7), piano (10)
- Ian Stewart – piano (1, 9)

Technical

- Jimmy Miller – producer
- Glyn Johns – engineer
- Andy Johns – engineer
- Chris Kimsey – engineer
- Jimmy Johnson – engineer
- Doug Sax – mastering engineer
- Andy Warhol – cover concept/photography
- John Pasche – cover concept (Spanish issue)
- Phil Jude – photography (Spanish issue)

== Charts ==
=== Weekly charts ===
1971 weekly chart performance for Sticky Fingers
Chart (1971)	Peak position
Australian Albums (Kent Music Report)	1
Belgian Albums (HUMO)	1
Canada Top Albums/CDs (RPM)	1
Dutch Albums (Album Top 100)	1
Finland (The Official Finnish Charts)	1
German Albums (Offizielle Top 100)	1
Italian Albums (Musica e Dischi)	5
Japanese Albums (Oricon)	9
Norwegian Albums (VG-lista)	1
Spanish Albums Chart	1
Swedish Kvällstoppen Chart	1
UK Albums (Official Charts)	1
US Billboard 200	1

2015 weekly chart performance for Sticky Fingers
Chart (2015)	Peak position
Australian Albums (ARIA)	24
Austrian Albums (Ö3 Austria)	9
Belgian Albums (Ultratop Flanders)	7
Czech Albums (ČNS IFPI)	17
French Albums (SNEP)	11
German Albums (Offizielle Top 100)	5
Greek Albums (IFPI)	9
Irish Albums (IRMA)	6
Italian Albums (FIMI)	15
Dutch Albums (Album Top 100)	2
New Zealand Albums (RMNZ)	8
Norwegian Albums (VG-lista)	16
Portuguese Albums (AFP)	25
Scottish Albums (Official Charts)	4
Spanish Albums (Promusicae)	8
Swedish Albums (Sverigetopplistan)	31
Swiss Albums (Schweizer Hitparade)	16
UK Albums (Official Charts)	7
UK Album Downloads (Official Charts)	63
US Billboard 200	5
US Billboard 200 Super Deluxe Edition	65

=== Year-end charts ===
1971 year-end chart performance for Sticky Fingers
Chart (1971)	Position
Australian Albums Chart	18
Dutch Albums Chart	1
French Albums Chart	24
German Albums Chart	13
UK Albums Chart	3
US Billboard 200	21

== Certifications ==
Certifications for Sticky Fingers
Region	Certification	Certified units/sales
Australia (ARIA) original release	Gold	20,000^{^}
Australia (ARIA) release of 2015	Gold	35,000^{^}
Canada (Music Canada)	Platinum	100,000^{^}
France (SNEP)	Gold	100,000^{*}
Italy (FIMI)	Gold	25,000^{‡}
New Zealand (RMNZ)	Platinum	15,000^{‡}
Norway (IFPI Norway)	Silver	20,000
United Kingdom (BPI) release of 2015	Platinum	300,000^{‡}
United States (RIAA)	3× Platinum	3,000,000^{^}
^{*} Sales figures based on certification alone.^{^} Shipments figures based on certification alone.^{‡} Sales+streaming figures based on certification alone.

== See also ==
- Album era
- List of Canadian number-one albums of 1971
- List of number-one albums in Australia during the 1970s
- List of number-one albums from the 1970s (UK)
