= Singles 1963–1965 =

Box set by The Rolling Stones
- Released: 26 April 2004
- Recorded: May 1963 – March 1965
- Genre: Rock
- Length: 78:08
- Label: Decca/ABKCO
- Producers: Andrew Loog Oldham, Eric Easton

The Rolling Stones chronology
| Forty Licks (2002) | Singles 1963–1965 (2004) | Singles 1965–1967 (2004) |

Professional ratings
Review scores
| Source | Rating |
|---|---|
| AllMusic | 4/5 stars |
| Encyclopedia of Popular Music | 5/5 stars |
| Tom Hull | A− |

Singles 1963–1965 is a box set compilation of the singles and EPs by the Rolling Stones spanning the years 1963 to 1965. Part of a series of repackages by ABKCO Records, who license the Rolling Stones' 1963–1970 recorded works, Singles 1963–1965 is the first of three successive volumes to commemorate their non-LP releases during this era.

While the set features faithful replicas of all individual single covers (even the CDs are reproduced in black), the set—and both its successors—came under some criticism as to their necessity, especially as 1989's Singles Collection: The London Years included eighteen of this set's thirty-two songs. However, Singles 1963–1965 is notable for the first ever CD editions of the Rolling Stones' three British EPs released by Decca Records in 1964 and 1965, reinstating what had been long sought-after recordings to the band's catalogue.

Journalist Nigel Williamson provides a liner notes essay.

== Track listing ==
All songs by Mick Jagger and Keith Richards, except where noted.

Disc one

1. "Come On" (Chuck Berry) – 1:48
2. "I Want to Be Loved" (Willie Dixon) – 1:52

Disc two

1. "I Wanna Be Your Man" (John Lennon/Paul McCartney) – 1:44
2. "Stoned" (Nanker Phelge) – 2:07

Disc three (The Rolling Stones)

1. "Bye Bye Johnny" (Chuck Berry) – 2:09
2. "Money" (Berry Gordy Jr./Janie Bradford) – 2:31
3. "You Better Move On" (Arthur Alexander) – 2:39
4. "Poison Ivy" (Jerry Leiber/Mike Stoller) – 2:06

Disc four

1. "Not Fade Away" (Norman Petty/Charles Hardin) – 1:47
2. "Little by Little" (Nanker Phelge/Phil Spector) – 2:39

Disc five

1. "It's All Over Now" (Bobby Womack/Shirley Jean Womack) – 3:28
2. "Good Times, Bad Times" – 2:30

Disc six (Five by Five)

1. "If You Need Me" (Robert Batemen/Wilson Pickett) – 2:03
2. "Empty Heart" (Nanker Phelge) – 2:37
3. "2120 South Michigan Avenue" (Nanker Phelge) – 2:07
4. "Confessin' the Blues" (Walter Brown/Jay McShann) – 2:48
5. "Around and Around" (Chuck Berry) – 3:05

Disc seven

1. "Tell Me" – 2:37
2. "I Just Want to Make Love to You" (Willie Dixon) – 2:17

Disc eight

1. "Time Is on My Side" (Norman Meade) – 2:52
2. "Congratulations" – 2:28

Disc nine

1. "Little Red Rooster" (Willie Dixon) – 3:05
2. "Off the Hook" – 2:34

Disc ten

1. "Heart of Stone" – 2:46
2. "What a Shame" – 3:03

Disc eleven

1. "The Last Time" – 3:42
2. "Play with Fire" (Nanker Phelge) – 2:14

Disc twelve (Got Live If You Want It!)

1. "We Want The Stones" (Nanker Phelge) – 0:13
2. "Everybody Needs Somebody to Love" (Solomon Burke/Bert Russell/Jerry Wexler) – 0:36
3. "Pain in My Heart" (Naomi Neville) – 2:03
4. "Route 66" (Bobby Troup) – 2:36
5. "I'm Moving On" (Hank Snow) – 2:13
6. "I'm Alright" – 2:22
