= Singles Collection: The London Years =

Compilation album by the Rolling Stones
- Released: 15 August 1989
- Recorded: May 1963 – February 1970
- Genres: Rock; blues; R&B; pop; psychedelic rock; country blues
- Length: 185:44
- Label: ABKCO
- Producers: Andrew Loog Oldham; Eric Easton; The Rolling Stones; Jimmy Miller; Jack Nitzsche
- Compilers: Andrew Loog Oldham; P. D. Rain and Jody Klein

The Rolling Stones chronology
Dirty Work (1986)	Singles Collection: The London Years (1989)	Steel Wheels (1989)

Singles Collection: The London Years is a compilation album by the Rolling Stones, released in 1989. It was released as a 3-CD and a 4-LP set.

== Background ==
Singles Collection: The London Years was released by former manager Allen Klein's ABKCO Records (who usurped control of the band's Decca/London material in 1970) after the band's departure from Decca and Klein.

The set is a triple album of every Rolling Stones single—and their B-sides—mostly in their original mono mixes (at least as of the 2002 reissue), in both the UK and US encompassing their entire era with Decca Records in the United Kingdom and London Records in the United States—hence the album's title.

The original collection was produced by Andrew Loog Oldham, and digitally compiled and prepared under his supervision by P. D. Rain and Jody Klein.

With a range from 1963 to 1971, the set begins with their very first UK single, Chuck Berry's "Come On", and runs to Sticky Fingers' "Brown Sugar" and "Wild Horses" (which Allen Klein shares release rights with the Rolling Stones).

The only omissions are four B-sides from 1970 and 1971. "Bitch" and "Let It Rock" (released in the UK on the "Brown Sugar" single) and "Sway" (B-side to "Wild Horses"). Allen Klein did not have release rights to this material when this compilation was released. Also not included was "Natural Magic", a Jack Nitzsche instrumental, released as the B-side to the 1970 Mick Jagger single "Memo from Turner". These are available on the box set Singles 1968–1971 except "Let It Rock" which is available on the box set Singles 1971–2006 and the Rarities 1971–2003 album.

The release also does not include the EPs released by the band, The Rolling Stones, Five by Five and Got Live If You Want It!, which are available on the box set Singles 1963–1965.

== Release and reception ==
Professional ratings
Review scores
Source	Rating
AllMusic	5/5 stars
MSN Music	5/5 stars
Encyclopedia of Popular Music	5/5 stars
Rolling Stone	5/5 stars
Tom Hull	A

Singles Collection: The London Years was released at a timely juncture, just a couple of weeks before the Rolling Stones' comeback album Steel Wheels was due for release after a significant break, and months following their induction into the Rock and Roll Hall of Fame. Going platinum, the album reached No. 91 in the US.

In August 2002, Singles Collection: The London Years was issued in a new remastered Compact Disc and SACD digipak by ABKCO Records. This version had a few differences from the 1989 release. Notably, the recording of "Street Fighting Man" on the 1989 release (and other releases such as Through the Past, Darkly and Hot Rocks 1964–1971) is the LP stereo mix. The 2002 remaster uses the slightly shorter mono single mix. Also, the 2002 recording of "Sympathy for the Devil" fades out earlier than the 1989 version.

In 2006, Steven Van Zandt placed Singles Collection: The London Years on top of his list of the most essential albums of all time, calling it:

The greatest collection of music by the greatest rock & roll band there will ever be.

== Track listing ==
All songs by Mick Jagger and Keith Richards, except where noted.

=== Disc one ===
1. "Come On" (Chuck Berry) (1963 UK A side) – 1:48
2. "I Want to Be Loved" (Willie Dixon) (B side of UK "Come On") – 1:52
3. "I Wanna Be Your Man" (John Lennon/Paul McCartney) (1963 UK A side & US B side of "Not Fade Away") – 1:43
4. "Stoned" (Nanker Phelge) (B side of UK "I Wanna Be Your Man") – 2:09
5. "Not Fade Away" (Charles Hardin/Norman Petty) (1964 UK & US A side) ( – 1:47
6. "Little by Little" (Nanker Phelge/Phil Spector) (B side of UK "Not Fade Away") – 2:39
7. "It's All Over Now" (Bobby Womack/Shirley Jean Womack) (1964 UK & US A side) – 3:27
8. "Good Times, Bad Times" (B side of "It's All Over Now") – 2:31
9. "Tell Me" (1964 US A side) – 2:47
10. "I Just Want to Make Love to You" (Willie Dixon) (B side of "Tell Me") – 2:17
11. "Time Is on My Side" (Norman Meade) (1964 US A side) – 2:59
12. "Congratulations" (B side of "Time Is On My Side) – 2:28
13. "Little Red Rooster" (Willie Dixon) (1964 UK A side) – 3:05
14. "Off the Hook" (B side of "Little Red Rooster") – 2:34
15. "Heart of Stone" (1964 US A side) – 2:45
16. "What a Shame" (B side of "Heart Of Stone) – 3:03
17. "The Last Time (1965 A side)" – 3:42
18. "Play with Fire" [Nanker Phelge) (B side of "The Last Time") – 2:14
19. "(I Can't Get No) Satisfaction (1965 A side)" – 3:43
20. "The Under Assistant West Coast Promotion Man" (Nanker Phelge) (US B side of "I Can't Get No) Satisfaction") – 3:20
21. "The Spider and the Fly" (UK B side of "I Can't Get No) Satisfaction") – 3:38
22. "Get Off of My Cloud" (1965 A side) – 2:54
23. "I'm Free" (US B side of "Get Off of My Cloud") – 2:24
24. "The Singer Not the Song" (UK B side of "Get Off of My Cloud") – 2:22
25. "As Tears Go By" (Mick Jagger/Keith Richards/Andrew Loog Oldham) (1965 US A side & UK B side of "19th Nervous Breakdown) – 2:45

=== Disc two ===
1. "Gotta Get Away" (B side of "As Tears Go By") – 2:07
2. "19th Nervous Breakdown" (1966 A side) – 3:56
3. "Sad Day" (US B side of "19th Nervous Breakdown") – 3:01
4. "Paint It Black" (1966 A side) – 3:44
5. "Stupid Girl" (US B side of "Paint It Black") – 2:55
6. "Long Long While" (UK B side of "Paint It Black") – 3:01
7. "Mother's Little Helper" (1966 US A side) – 2:45
8. "Lady Jane" (B side of "Mother's Little Helper") – 3:10
9. "Have You Seen Your Mother, Baby, Standing in the Shadow?" (1966 A side) – 2:34
10. "Who's Driving Your Plane?" (B side of "Have You Seen Your Mother, Baby, Standing in the Shadow?") – 3:14
11. "Let's Spend the Night Together" (1967 double A side with "Ruby Tuesday") – 3:26
12. "Ruby Tuesday" (1967 double A side with "Let's Spend the Night Together") – 3:13
13. "We Love You" (1967 double A side with "Dandelion") – 4:36
14. "Dandelion" (1967 doule A side with "We Love You") – 3:48
15. "She's a Rainbow" (1967 US A side) – 4:11
16. "2000 Light Years from Home" (B side of "She's A Rainbow") – 4:44
17. "In Another Land" (Bill Wyman) (1967 US A side) – 2:53
18. "The Lantern" (B side of "In Another Land") – 4:26
19. "Jumpin' Jack Flash" (1968 A side) – 3:38
20. "Child of the Moon" (B side of "Jumpin' Jack Flash") – 3:12

=== Disc three ===
1. "Street Fighting Man" (1968 US A side) – 3:09
  - The 1989 release uses the 3:16 stereo version from Beggars Banquet
2. "No Expectations" (US B side of "Street Fighting Man") – 3:55
3. "Surprise, Surprise" (B side of 1971 "Street Fighting Man" UK A side)) – 2:30
4. "Honky Tonk Women" (1969 A side) – 3:00
5. "You Can't Always Get What You Want" (B side of "Honky Tonk Women") – 4:49
6. "Memo from Turner" – 4:06
  - Released as a Mick Jagger solo single in November 1970
7. "Brown Sugar" (1971 A side) – 3:49
8. "Wild Horses" (1971 US A side) – 5:42
9. "I Don't Know Why" (Stevie Wonder/Paul Riser/Don Hunter/Lula Hardaway) (1975 US A side) – 3:01
10. "Try a Little Harder" (B side of "I Don't Know Why") – 2:17
11. "Out of Time" (1975 A side) – 3:22
12. "Jiving Sister Fanny" (B side of "Out of Time") – 3:20
13. "Sympathy for the Devil" (1969 UK A side) – 6:17
  - The 1989 release contains a slightly longer 6:24 version

All tracks on disc one and most of disc two were produced by Andrew Loog Oldham; tracks 1–4 of disc one were co-produced with Eric Easton. Tracks 15–18 of disc two were produced by the Rolling Stones and tracks 19–20 produced by Jimmy Miller. All tracks on disc three were produced by Jimmy Miller, except tracks 3, 10, and 11, which were produced by Andrew Loog Oldham, and track 6, which was produced by Jack Nitzsche.

== Chart positions ==
Year	Chart	Position
1989	Billboard 200	91

== Certifications ==
Certifications for Singles Collection: The London Years
Region	Certification	Certified units/sales
Australia (ARIA)	Gold	35,000^{‡}
United Kingdom (BPI)	Gold	100,000^{*}
United States (RIAA)	Platinum	333,333^{^}
^{*} Sales figures based on certification alone.^{^} Shipments figures based on certification alone.^{‡} Sales+streaming figures based on certification alone.
