= Rolled Gold: The Very Best of the Rolling Stones =

1975 compilation album by The Rolling Stones

Greatest hits album by the Rolling Stones
- Released: 14 November 1975
- Recorded: May 1963 – November 1969
- Genre: Rock
- Length: 97:44
- Label: Decca
- Producer: Andrew Loog Oldham, Jimmy Miller, The Rolling Stones

The Rolling Stones chronology
Metamorphosis (1975)	Rolled Gold: The Very Best of the Rolling Stones (1975)	Black and Blue (1976)

Professional ratings
Review scores
Source	Rating
AllMusic	4.5/5 stars

Rolled Gold: The Very Best of the Rolling Stones is a compilation album by the Rolling Stones released without the band's authorisation by their former label Decca Records in 1975. It is a double album that reached No. 7 on the UK chart and was a strong seller over the years.

== Track listing ==
All tracks are written by Mick Jagger and Keith Richards except where noted.

Side one
No.	Title	Writer(s)	Release date	Length
1.	"Come On"	Chuck Berry	June 1963	1:50
2.	"I Wanna Be Your Man"	Lennon-McCartney	November 1963	1:43
3.	"Not Fade Away"	Norman Petty/Buddy Holly	February 1964	1:49
4.	"Carol"	Berry	June 1964	2:35
5.	"It's All Over Now"	Bobby Womack/Shirley Womack	June 1964	3:20
6.	"Little Red Rooster"	Willie Dixon	November 1964	3:01
7.	"Time Is on My Side"	Norman Meade/Jimmy Norman	September 1964	2:50
8.	"The Last Time"		February 1965	3:25
9.	"(I Can't Get No) Satisfaction"		May 1965	3:45
Total length:				24:18

Side two
No.	Title	Writer(s)	Release date	Length
1.	"Get Off of My Cloud"		September 1965	2:55
2.	"19th Nervous Breakdown"		February 1966	3:55
3.	"As Tears Go By"	Jagger/Richards/Andrew Loog Oldham	December 1965	2:33
4.	"Under My Thumb"		April 1966	3:42
5.	"Lady Jane"		June 1966	3:06
6.	"Out of Time"		April 1966	5:15
7.	"Paint It Black"		May 1966	3:15
Total length:				25:25

Side three
No.	Title	Release date	Length
1.	"Have You Seen Your Mother, Baby, Standing in the Shadow?"	September 1966	2:33
2.	"Let's Spend the Night Together"	January 1967	3:15
3.	"Ruby Tuesday"	January 1967	3:12
4.	"Yesterday's Papers"	January 1967	2:04
5.	"We Love You"	August 1967	4:39
6.	"She's a Rainbow"	December 1967	4:35
7.	"Jumpin' Jack Flash"	May 1968	3:40
Total length:			23:58

Side four
No.	Title	Release date	Length
1.	"Honky Tonk Women"	July 1969	3:00
2.	"Sympathy for the Devil"	December 1968	6:25
3.	"Street Fighting Man"	August 1968	3:16
4.	"Midnight Rambler"	December 1969	6:52
5.	"Gimme Shelter"	December 1969	4:30
Total length:			24:03

== Rolled Gold+: The Very Best of the Rolling Stones (2007 edition) ==
Rolled Gold+: The Very Best of the Rolling Stones

Greatest hits album by the Rolling Stones
- Released: 12 November 2007
- Recorded: May 1963 – April 1971
- Genre: Pop, Rock
- Length: 147:09
- Label: UMTV
- Producer: Eric Easton, Andrew Loog Oldham, The Rolling Stones, Jimmy Miller

The Rolling Stones chronology
Rarities 1971–2003 (2005)	Rolled Gold+: The Very Best of the Rolling Stones (2007)	Shine a Light (2008)

In 2007, the original collection was expanded to 40 songs from the original's 28 tracks. Released in the UK on 12 November 2007, it is an expanded rerelease of the original 1975 collection which reached No. 7 on the UK chart. The set debuted at No. 26 on the UK chart on 18 November 2007. It had sold over 125,000 copies by April 2008, according to Music Week.

The album is available in double CD, quadruple vinyl LP, and USB flash drive editions; the USB edition was the first album to be released in the UK in this format. It is also available via digital download. Cover design by Alex Trochut.

Professional ratings
Review scores
Source	Rating
AllMusic	4.5/5 stars

=== Revised track listing ===
All tracks are written by Mick Jagger and Keith Richards except where noted.

Disc one
No.	Title	Writer(s)	Release date	Length
1.	"Come On"	Berry	June 1963	1:49
2.	"I Wanna Be Your Man"	Lennon-McCartney	November 1963	1:44
3.	"Not Fade Away"	Petty/Hardin	February 1964	1:48
4.	"Carol"	Berry	June 1964	1:48
5.	"Tell Me"		June 1964	3:49
6.	"It's All Over Now"	Womack/Womack	June 1964	3:27
7.	"Little Red Rooster"	Dixon	November 1964	3:07
8.	"Heart of Stone"		December 1964	2:51
9.	"Time Is on My Side"	Meade/Norman	September 1964	2:59
10.	"The Last Time"		February 1965	3:42
11.	"Play with Fire"	Nanker Phelge	February 1965	2:13
12.	"(I Can't Get No) Satisfaction"		May 1965	3:44
13.	"Get Off of My Cloud"		September 1965	2:55
14.	"I'm Free"		September 1965	2:24
15.	"As Tears Go By"	Jagger/Richards/Oldham	December 1965	2:46
16.	"Lady Jane"		June 1966	3:09
17.	"Paint It Black"		May 1966	3:24
18.	"Mother's Little Helper"		July 1966	2:46
19.	"19th Nervous Breakdown"		February 1966	3:59
20.	"Under My Thumb"		April 1966	3:43
21.	"Out of Time"		April 1966	5:37
22.	"Yesterday's Papers"		January 1967	2:05
23.	"Let's Spend the Night Together"		January 1967	3:37
24.	"Have You Seen Your Mother, Baby, Standing in the Shadow?"		September 1966	2:34
Total length:				1:02:41

Disc two
No.	Title	Release date	Length
1.	"Ruby Tuesday"	January 1967	3:15
2.	"Dandelion"	August 1967	3:32
3.	"She's a Rainbow"	December 1967	4:14
4.	"We Love You"	August 1967	4:24
5.	"2000 Light Years from Home"	December 1967	4:47
6.	"Jumpin' Jack Flash"	May 1968	3:43
7.	"Street Fighting Man"	August 1968	3:15
8.	"Sympathy for the Devil"	December 1968	6:20
9.	"No Expectations"	December 1968	3:56
10.	"Let It Bleed"	December 1969	5:28
11.	"Midnight Rambler"	December 1969	6:55
12.	"Gimme Shelter"	December 1969	4:33
13.	"You Can't Always Get What You Want"	December 1969	7:28
14.	"Brown Sugar"	April 1971	3:50
15.	"Honky Tonk Women"	July 1969	3:01
16.	"Wild Horses"	June 1971	5:42
Total length:			1:14:23

Songs that are on the 2007 collection, but were not on the 1975 collection are:

1. "Tell Me"
2. "Heart of Stone"
3. "Play with Fire"
4. "I'm Free"
5. "Mother's Little Helper"
6. "Dandelion"
7. "2000 Light Years from Home"
8. "No Expectations"
9. "Let It Bleed"
10. "You Can't Always Get What You Want"
11. "Brown Sugar"
12. "Wild Horses"

== Charts ==
=== Weekly charts ===
Weekly chart performance for Rolled Gold
Chart (1975–2010)	Peak position
Australian Albums (Kent Music Report)	13
German Albums (Offizielle Top 100)	98
Italian Albums (FIMI)	98
New Zealand Albums (RMNZ)	10
Swedish Albums (Sverigetopplistan)	27
UK Albums (OCC)	7

Weekly chart performance for Rolled Gold+
Chart (2007–10)	Peak position
Dutch Albums (Album Top 100)	66
Italian Albums (FIMI)	68
Norwegian Albums (VG-lista)	30
Swiss Albums (Schweizer Hitparade)	48
UK Albums (OCC)	26

=== Year-end charts ===
Year-end chart performance for Rolled Gold
Chart (1976)	Position
UK Albums (OCC)	48

== Certifications and sales ==
Region	Certification	Certified units/sales
United Kingdom (BPI)	Gold	100,000^{^}
^{^} Shipments figures based on certification alone.
