= Stoned (Rolling Stones song) =

Single by the Rolling Stones
- A-side: "I Wanna Be Your Man"
- Released: 1 November 1963 (UK)
- Recorded: 7 October 1963
- Studio: Kingsway, London
- Genre: Instrumental rock; blues
- Length: 2:07
- Label: Decca F 11764 (UK); London 9641 (US)
- Composer: Nanker Phelge
- Producers: Andrew Loog Oldham; Eric Easton

The Rolling Stones singles chronology
"Come On" (1963)	"I Wanna Be Your Man" / "Stoned" (1963)	"Not Fade Away" (1964)

"Stoned" was released in the United Kingdom by the Rolling Stones on the Decca label on 1 November 1963, as the B-side to their version of "I Wanna Be Your Man". Recorded in early October 1963, it was the first song released to be credited to "Nanker Phelge", and the band's first original composition, derivative of "Green Onions" by Booker T. & the M.G.s. This bluesy quasi-instrumental features Jones on harmonica and Stewart on tack piano, with occasional vocals from Jagger who huskily recites "Stoned .... outa mah mind .... where am I at?"

The single was briefly released in the United States on the London Records label in March 1964, but was quickly withdrawn on "moral grounds" until its inclusion on Singles Collection: The London Years in 1989. It also appeared on the 1973 UK-only compilation No Stone Unturned, and on Singles 1963-1965 (2004).

The title was altered to "Stones" on some copies of the British release. The title "Stones" also appears on some foreign E.P.s.

== Personnel ==
- Mick Jagger – vocals
- Keith Richards – guitar
- Brian Jones – harmonica
- Ian Stewart – piano
- Bill Wyman – bass guitar
- Charlie Watts – drums
