= Slow Rollers =

Compilation album by the Rolling Stones
- Released: November 1981
- Genre: Rock
- Length: 42:55
- Label: Decca
- Producer: Andrew Loog Oldham, Jimmy Miller

The Rolling Stones chronology
Solid Rock (1980)	Slow Rollers (1981)	Sucking in the Seventies (1981)

Slow Rollers is a compilation album of ballads by the Rolling Stones released in 1981. It is a follow-up to the compilation of rock and roll numbers a year earlier called Solid Rock. The main feature is the Italian version of "As Tears Go By", which sees its first international release with this album. All other tracks were previously released in all markets. This is the last Decca compilation of Rolling Stones recordings.

Professional ratings
Review scores
Source	Rating
AllMusic	3.5/5 stars

== Track listing ==
All songs composed by Mick Jagger and Keith Richards except as noted

=== Side one ===
1. "You Can't Always Get What You Want" (single edit) – 4:47
2. "Take It or Leave It" – 2:51
3. "You Better Move On" (Arthur Alexander) – 2:42
4. "Time Is on My Side" (Norman Meade) – 3:00
5. "Pain in My Heart" (Naomi Neville) – 2:14
6. "Dear Doctor" – 3:28
7. "Con le mie lacrime (As Tears Go By)" (Jagger, Richards, Oldham, Danpa) – 2:47

=== Side two ===
1. "Ruby Tuesday" – 3:18
2. "Play with Fire" (Nanker Phelge) – 2:17
3. "Lady Jane" – 3:12
4. "Sittin' on a Fence" – 3:07
5. "Back Street Girl" – 3:25
6. "Under the Boardwalk" (Arthur Resnick/Kenny Young) – 2:48
7. "Heart of Stone" – 2:49
