= Solid Rock (Rolling Stones album) =

Compilation album by The Rolling Stones
- Released: 10 October 1980
- Recorded: 1963–1969
- Genre: Rock
- Label: Decca
- Producer: Andrew Loog Oldham, Jimmy Miller, and The Rolling Stones

The Rolling Stones chronology
| Emotional Rescue (1980) | Solid Rock (1980) | Slow Rollers (1981) |

Solid Rock is a compilation by The Rolling Stones released in 1980. It was the first Decca compilation in five years. It would be followed by a compilation of ballads a year later called Slow Rollers.

== Track listing ==
All songs composed by Mick Jagger and Keith Richards except as noted

Side one

1. "Carol" (Chuck Berry)
2. "Route 66" (Bobby Troup)
3. "Fortune Teller" (Naomi Neville)
4. "I Wanna Be Your Man" (John Lennon/Paul McCartney)
5. "Poison Ivy" (Jerry Leiber/Mike Stoller)
6. "Not Fade Away" (Charles Hardin/Norman Petty)
7. "(I Can't Get No) Satisfaction"
8. "Get Off of My Cloud"

Side two

1. "Jumpin' Jack Flash"
2. "Connection"
3. "All Sold Out"
4. "Citadel"
5. "Parachute Woman"
6. "Live with Me"
7. "Honky Tonk Women"
