= Milestones (Rolling Stones album) =

Compilation album by The Rolling Stones
- Released: 18 February 1972
- Recorded: 1963–68
- Genre: Rock
- Length: 36:09
- Language: English
- Label: Decca
- Producer: Andrew Loog Oldham, The Rolling Stones, Jimmy Miller

The Rolling Stones compilations chronology
| Hot Rocks 1964–1971 (1971) | Milestones (1972) | Exile on Main St. (1972) |

Professional ratings
Review scores
| Source | Rating |
|---|---|
| AllMusic | 3/5 stars |

Milestones is a compilation album by the Rolling Stones, released in 1972 by Decca Records. It reached number 14 on the UK Albums Chart. Less popular and well known than the contemporaneous compilation album Hot Rocks 1964–1971, it was released by Decca without the consent or input from the band. Due to the nature of their contract prior to 1971, the band lost all rights to releases of their own music prior to 1971; those rights instead are held jointly by ABKCO Records and Decca Records. Both ABKCO and Decca would continue to release compilation albums, without input from the band, over the next several decades. The front cover is a closeup of Mick Jagger live, while the back cover shows the faces of the rest of the band's original lineup: Brian Jones, Keith Richards, Bill Wyman and Charlie Watts, in four boxes much like the Beatles Let It Be front cover.

== Track listing ==
All songs composed by Mick Jagger and Keith Richards, except where noted.

=== Side one ===
1. "(I Can't Get No) Satisfaction" – 3:44
2. "She's a Rainbow" (with intro) – 4:38
3. "Under My Thumb" – 3:43
4. "I Just Want to Make Love to You" (Willie Dixon) – 2:20
5. "Yesterday's Papers" – 2:06
6. "I Wanna Be Your Man" (John Lennon/Paul McCartney) – 1:46

=== Side two ===
1. "Time Is on My Side" (Norman Meade) (True stereo) – 3:00
2. "Get Off of My Cloud" – 3:02
3. "Not Fade Away" (Norman Petty/Charles Hardin) – 1:50
4. "Out of Time" – 3:45
5. "She Said Yeah" (Rody Jackson/Sonny Christy) (fake stereo) – 1:36
6. "Stray Cat Blues" – 4:41

== Charts ==
| Chart (1972) | Peak position |
|---|---|
| Australian Albums (Kent Music Report) | 47 |
| Norwegian Albums (VG-lista) | 20 |
| UK Albums (OCC) | 14 |
