= The Rolling Stones (album) =

- UK edition, members from left to right, Brian Jones, Keith Richards, Bill Wyman, Charlie Watts, Mick Jagger.

Studio album by the Rolling Stones
- Released: 17 April 1964
- Recorded: 3 January – 25 February 1964
- Studios: Regent Sound, London
- Genres: Rock and roll; British blues; rhythm and blues
- Length: 33:24
- Label: Decca
- Producers: Eric Easton; Andrew Loog Oldham

The Rolling Stones UK chronology
The Rolling Stones (1964)	The Rolling Stones (1964)	Five by Five (1964)

The Rolling Stones US chronology
England's Newest Hit Makers (1964)	12 × 5 (1964)

Singles from England's Newest Hit Makers
- 1. "Not Fade Away" Released: 6 March 1964; 2. "Tell Me" Released: 12 June 1964

The Rolling Stones is the debut studio album by the English rock band the Rolling Stones, released by Decca Records in the UK on 17 April 1964. The American edition of the LP, with a slightly different track list, came out on London Records on 29 May 1964, subtitled England's Newest Hit Makers.

== Recording ==
Recorded at Regent Sound Studios in London over the course of five days in January and February 1964, The Rolling Stones was produced by then-managers Andrew Loog Oldham and Eric Easton. The album was originally released by Decca Records in the UK, while the US version appeared on the London Records label.

The majority of the tracks reflect the band's love for R&B. Mick Jagger and Keith Richards (whose professional name until 1978 omitted the "s" in his surname) were fledgling songwriters during early 1964, contributing only one original composition to the album: "Tell Me (You're Coming Back)". Two songs are credited to "Nanker Phelge" – a pseudonym the band used for group compositions from 1963 to 1965. Phil Spector and Gene Pitney both contributed to the recording sessions, and are referred to as "Uncle Phil and Uncle Gene" in the subtitle of the Phelge instrumental "Now I've Got a Witness".

== Release ==
First pressings of the album, with matrix numbers ending in 1A, 2A, 1B, and 2B, have a 2:52 version of "Tell Me (You're Coming Back)", which was pressed from the wrong master tape. Subsequent pressings include the 4:06 version. Early labels and covers also have misprints with the fourth track on side 1 listed as "Mona", which was later changed to "I Need You Baby", the subtitle of "Now I've Got a Witness" written "Like Uncle Gene and Uncle Phil", the word 'If' omitted from "You Can Make It If You Try", and 'Dozier' spelt 'Bozier'. "Route 66" is listed as "(Get Your Kicks On) Route 66" on some versions of the album, and some later versions of the album have "I Need You Baby" listed as "Mona (I Need You Baby)" and the subtitles of "Now I've Got a Witness" and "Tell Me (You're Coming Back)" removed entirely.

The album cover photo was taken by Nicholas Wright. The cover bears no title or identifying information other than the photo and the Decca logo – an "unheard of" design concept originated by manager Andrew Oldham.

Upon its release, The Rolling Stones became one of 1964's biggest sellers in the UK, staying at No. 1 for twelve weeks.

The original British version of the album was released on compact disc in 1984, but became out-of-print on CD for many years afterwards. In November 2010, it was made available as part of a limited edition vinyl box set titled The Rolling Stones 1964–1969, and by itself digitally at the same time. The original title was also reinstated as part of The Rolling Stones in Mono CD box set, released on 30 September 2016. The album was only released in mono in both the UK and US; no true stereo mix was ever made.

The US version of the album, originally self-titled but later officially called England's Newest Hit Makers, was the band's debut US album and was released by London Records on 29 May 1964, a month and a half after the British version. The track "Not Fade Away" (the A-side of the band's third UK single) replaced "I Need You Baby", and the titles of the tracks "Now I've Got a Witness (Like Uncle Phil and Uncle Gene)" and "Tell Me (You're Coming Back)" were shortened to "Now I've Got a Witness" and "Tell Me" on most versions of the American release. Upon its release, The Rolling Stones reached No. 11 in the US, going gold in the process. To date, this is the Rolling Stones' only American studio album that has failed to place in the top ten on the Billboard album charts. In August 2002, the album, by now officially called England's Newest Hit Makers, was reissued as a new remastered CD and SACD Digipak by ABKCO.

== Critical reception ==
Professional ratings
Review scores
Source	Rating
AllMusic	4.5/5 stars
The Encyclopedia of Popular Music	4/5 stars
Entertainment Weekly	C+
The Great Rock Discography	8/10
MusicHound Rock	4/5 stars
The Rolling Stone Album Guide	4/5 stars
Tom Hull	UK: A− US: A

The album was included in Robert Dimery's 1001 Albums You Must Hear Before You Die (2010). Sean Egan of BBC Music wrote of the record in 2012: "It's a testament to the group's brilliance that the result was still the best album to emerge from the early 1960s British blues boom … the ensemble lovingly deliver some of their favourite shots of rhythm 'n' blues." And Paul Cashmere described the album as "mainly Blues, Rock and Roll and Rhythm & Blues covers with the Stones displaying their influences from American music of the 50s and early 60s." It was voted number 418 in Colin Larkin's All Time Top 1000 Albums.

== Legacy ==
For his 1972 single "The Jean Genie", David Bowie aimed to replicate the sound of The Rolling Stones. He said: "I didn't get that near to it, but it had a feel that I wanted – that '60s thing."

== Track listing ==
=== UK edition ===
Side one
No.	Title	Writer(s)	Length
1.	"Route 66"	Bobby Troup	2:20
2.	"I Just Want to Make Love to You"	Willie Dixon	2:17
3.	"Honest I Do"	Jimmy Reed	2:09
4.	"Mona (I Need You Baby)"	Ellas McDaniel	3:33
5.	"Now I've Got a Witness (Like Uncle Phil and Uncle Gene)"	Nanker Phelge	2:29
6.	"Little by Little"	Phelge, Phil Spector	2:39
Total length:			15:27

Side two
No.	Title	Writer(s)	Length
1.	"I'm a King Bee"	James Moore	2:35
2.	"Carol"	Chuck Berry	2:33
3.	"Tell Me (You're Coming Back)"	Jagger–Richards	4:05
4.	"Can I Get a Witness"	Brian Holland, Lamont Dozier, Eddie Holland	2:55
5.	"You Can Make It If You Try"	Ted Jarrett	2:01
6.	"Walking the Dog"	Rufus Thomas	3:10
Total length:			17:19 32:46

=== US edition ===
Side one
No.	Title	Writer(s)	Length
1.	"Not Fade Away"	Buddy Holly, Norman Petty	1:48
2.	"Route 66"	Bobby Troup	2:20
3.	"I Just Want to Make Love to You"	Willie Dixon	2:17
4.	"Honest I Do"	Jimmy Reed	2:09
5.	"Now I've Got a Witness"	Phelge	2:29
6.	"Little by Little"	Phelge, Phil Spector	2:39
Total length:			13:42

Side two
No.	Title	Writer(s)	Length
1.	"I'm a King Bee"	James Moore	2:35
2.	"Carol"	Chuck Berry	2:33
3.	"Tell Me (You're Coming Back)"	Jagger–Richards	4:05
4.	"Can I Get a Witness"	Brian Holland, Lamont Dozier, Eddie Holland	2:55
5.	"You Can Make It If You Try"	Ted Jarrett	2:01
6.	"Walking the Dog"	Rufus Thomas	3:10
Total length:			17:19 31:01

== Personnel ==
According to authors Philippe Margotin and Jean-Michel Guesdon, except where noted:

The Rolling Stones

- Mick Jagger – vocals, handclaps, tambourine; harmonica ("Honest I Do", "I'm a King Bee"), maracas ("Not Fade Away", "Mona")
- Keith Richards – backing vocals, lead and rhythm (6- and 12-string) guitars
- Brian Jones – backing vocals, rhythm guitar; lead guitar ("I'm a King Bee"); slide guitar ("Walking the Dog", "I'm a King Bee"); harmonica ("Not Fade Away", "I Just Want to Make Love to You", "Now I've Got a Witness"); tambourine ("Tell Me", "Can I Get a Witness"); whistling ("Walking the Dog")
- Bill Wyman – backing vocals, bass, handclaps
- Charlie Watts – drums, handclaps
- Unidentified musician (played by the Rolling Stones) – tambourine ("Mona", "Little by Little")

Additional musicians

- Allan Clarke – backing vocals ("Little by Little")
- Graham Nash – backing vocals ("Little by Little")
- Gene Pitney – piano ("Little by Little")
- Phil Spector – percussion, maracas ("Little by Little")
- Ian Stewart – organ ("Now I've Got a Witness", "You Can Make It If You Try"); piano ("Tell Me", "Can I Get a Witness")

Production and additional personnel

- Andrew Loog Oldham – producer
- Bill Farley – engineer
- Nicholas Wright – photography

== Charts ==
Chart (1964–1965)	Peak position
Australian Albums (Kent Music Report)	1
Finland (The Official Finnish Charts)	2
German Albums (Offizielle Top 100)	2
UK Albums (Official Charts)	1
US Billboard 200	11

Chart (2024)	Peak position
Croatian International Albums (HDU)	23
Greek Albums (IFPI)	64

== Certifications ==
Region	Certification	Certified units/sales
Canada (Music Canada)	Platinum	100,000^{^}
United States (RIAA)	Gold	500,000^{^}
^{^} Shipments figures based on certification alone.
