= The Rolling Stones (EP) =

EP by the Rolling Stones
- Released: 10 January 1964
- Recorded: 8 August and 14 November 1963
- Studios: Decca, London; De Lane Lea, London
- Genre: Rock
- Length: 9:25
- Labels: Decca (UK); London (Canada)
- Producers: Andrew Loog Oldham, Eric Easton

The Rolling Stones chronology
| The Rolling Stones (1964) | The Rolling Stones (1964) |

The Rolling Stones is the debut EP released by the Rolling Stones on 10 January 1964.

== History ==
It was released both to capitalise on their first Top 20 hit "I Wanna Be Your Man" and to test the commercial appeal of the band before their UK label Decca Records would commit to letting them record an album. The Rolling Stones includes four songs recorded at two separate sessions in August and November 1963.

The Rolling Stones features R&B covers of some of the band's favourite artists, and some recent American hits. Impact Sound is officially listed as the EP's producer. Eric Easton is possibly involved, Andrew Loog Oldham produced the opening track "Bye Bye Johnny".

== Release and reception ==
Professional ratings
Review scores
| Source | Rating |
|---|---|
| AllMusic | 4/5 stars |

Despite the rawness of the production, the EP reached No. 1 in the UK EP charts in February 1964, having entered the chart the week after its release.

The EP was released in Canada in 1964 by London Records Canada. The release was identical to the UK version including the picture sleeve along with the British label number DFE 8560. The Canadian EP pressing also used British stampers.

Bruce Eder of AllMusic writes: "The real centrepiece was Arthur Alexander's 'You Better Move On,' an American-spawned favourite that the band had been doing in concert — this was their chance to show a softer, more lyrical and soulful sound that was every bit as intense as the blues and hard R&B they'd already done on record..."

"Bye Bye Johnny" and "Money" did not see official US release until 1972's retrospective More Hot Rocks (Big Hits & Fazed Cookies); "You Better Move On" was featured on 1965's December's Children (And Everybody's); and "Poison Ivy" was issued in 2002 on the remastered version of More Hot Rocks.

Unavailable for decades, The Rolling Stones was reissued on Compact Disc in 2004 on the Singles 1963–1965 box set through ABKCO Records.

In November 2010, it was made available as part of a limited edition vinyl box set titled The Rolling Stones 1964-1969, by itself digitally at the same time, and in 2011 as part of the 60's UK EP Collection digital compilation.

On November 23, 2012, the EP was reissued on 7-inch vinyl record as a part of Record Store Day Black Friday 2012.

== Track listing ==
Side one
| No. | Title | Length |
|---|---|---|
| 1. | "Bye Bye Johnny" (Chuck Berry) | 2:09 |
| 2. | "Money" (Berry Gordy/Janie Bradford) | 2:31 |
| Total length: | | 4:40 |

Side two
| No. | Title | Length |
|---|---|---|
| 3. | "You Better Move On" (Arthur Alexander) | 2:39 |
| 4. | "Poison Ivy" (Jerry Leiber/Mike Stoller) | 2:06 |
| Total length: | | 4:45 9:25 |

== Personnel ==
The Rolling Stones

- Mick Jagger – lead vocals, tambourine
- Brian Jones – guitar, backing vocals, harmonica, percussion
- Keith Richards – guitar, backing vocals
- Bill Wyman – bass guitar, backing vocals
- Charlie Watts – drums
