= Alex Trochut =

Alex Trochut (born 1981) is a Spanish artist, graphic designer, illustrator, and typographer. Born in Barcelona and currently based in Brooklyn, NY. He has created album covers for Katy Perry's single "Roar" (2013) as well as The Rolling Stones' Rolled Gold: The Very Best of the Rolling Stones (2007), among others.

== Life and career ==
After completing his studies at ELISAVA, Trochut established his own design studio in Barcelona. In Barcelona, Trochut worked for two years at the design studios Toormix and Vasava before relocating to New York City where he currently works for a diverse range of clients on design, illustration and typography. Trochut is the grandson of Spanish graphic artist Joan Trochut.

Trochut has created design, illustration and typography for a diverse range of clients: Nike, Adidas, Puma, The Rolling Stones, Katy Perry, Vampire Weekend, Arcade Fire, Esquire UK, BBC, Coca-Cola, British Airways, Pepsi, The Guardian, The New York Times, Time and many others.

== Awards ==
Trochut has been honored for his work in design and typography by The Type Directors Club, Communication Arts and Graphis. In 2008, he was recognized for his inventive lettering style and was named an Art Directors Club Young Gun, honoring designers under 30. In 2014, Binary Prints was celebrated by the Creative Review with the coveted Best In Book Award in recognition of the inventive printing technique used to create day and night prints on a single page and recognized by Lost At E Minor, Cool Hunting, It's Nice That, The New York Times, Gizmodo, Vice magazine's The Creators Project and Fast Company.

== Publications ==
His monograph, More Is More, explores his working methodologies and influences and was published in 2011. More Is More was written by Dani Navarro.

== Exhibitions ==
Trochut's work has been exhibited internationally at Colette, Paris, Kinfolk, New York, Sonar, Barcelona and Art Basel, among other spaces.

== Links ==
Website:- https://alextrochut.com/ Instagram:- https://www.instagram.com/trochut UK agent:- https://www.ba-reps.com/illustrators/location:uk/alex-trochut
