= Dear Doctor (song) =

Song by the Rolling Stones

from the album Beggars Banquet
- Released: 6 December 1968
- Recorded: 13–21 May 1968
- Genre: Country blues
- Length: 3:26
- Label: ABKCO
- Songwriter(s): Jagger–Richards
- Producer(s): Jimmy Miller

"Dear Doctor" is a song by English rock and roll band the Rolling Stones featured on their 1968 album Beggars Banquet.

Written by Mick Jagger and Keith Richards, "Dear Doctor" is a country song with blues inflections. It is a good example of the acoustic guitar-based compositions that has earned Beggars Banquet its reputation as the Rolling Stones' "return to form". Bill Janovitz says in his review of the song, "With all acoustic instruments — guitar, tack piano, 12-string, harmonica, tambourine, and upright bass — ...the band manages to sound authentically old-time and primitive, with Mick Jagger employing the fake-American hick accent that he would continue to mine in future blues and country numbers throughout the Stones' career."

On the Rolling Stones' experiments with country, Jagger said in 2003, "The country songs, like 'Factory Girl' or 'Dear Doctor', on Beggars Banquet were really pastiche. There's a sense of humour in country music anyway, a way of looking at life in a humorous kind of way - and I think we were just acknowledging that element of the music."

The song tells the story of a young man discovering his fiancée has abandoned him on the day they are to be wed, to his relief:

I was tremblin', as I put on my jacket
It had creases as sharp as a knife
I put the ring in my pocket, but there was a note
And my heart it jumped into my mouth

It read, "Darlin', I'm sorry to hurt you
But I have no courage to speak to your face
But I'm down in Virginia with your cousin Lou
There'll be no wedding today"

Janovitz concludes, "Jagger may be poking fun a little, but he could not nail the parlance of the characters so precisely if he had not studied it closely as a fan of the music... In a sense, they have been musicologists, interpreting musical forms that were in danger of dying out. The raw quality of 'Dear Doctor' and the rest of the album was a welcoming sound to the ears of most Stones fans losing patience with their experimentation on Their Satanic Majesties Request."

"Dear Doctor" was recorded at London's Olympic Sound Studios between 13 and 21 May 1968. Despite its appearance on one of the Rolling Stones' more well-known albums, "Dear Doctor" has never been performed live by the band. It appears on the compilation album Slow Rollers.

== Personnel ==
The Rolling Stones

- Mick Jagger – lead and backing vocals
- Keith Richards – acoustic guitar, backing vocals
- Brian Jones – harmonica
- Bill Wyman – double bass
- Charlie Watts – snare drum, tambourine

Additional Personnel

- Nicky Hopkins – tack piano
