= Little by Little (Rolling Stones song) =

Single by The Rolling Stones

from the album The Rolling Stones
- A-side: "Not Fade Away"
- Released: 21 February 1964 (UK)
- Recorded: 4 February 1964
- Studio: Regent Sound, London
- Genre: Rhythm and blues
- Length: 2:39
- Label: Decca F11845
- Songwriter(s): Nanker Phelge, Phil Spector
- Producer(s): Andrew Loog Oldham

The Rolling Stones singles chronology
"I Wanna Be Your Man" (1963)	"Not Fade Away" / "Little by Little" (1964)	"It's All Over Now" (1964)

"Little by Little" is a song by the Rolling Stones recorded on 4 February 1964. Decca Records released it as the B-side to their version of "Not Fade Away" on 21 February 1964. The title stems from an identically titled track by Junior Wells and Earl Hooker, with the rhythmic similarity to "Shame, Shame, Shame" by Jimmy Reed, a song which was released the previous year. Reed was not credited for the song, however, Phil Spector was given co-credit with "Nanker Phelge" (a pseudonym for songs credited to the whole group). The song is also included on their April 1964 debut album The Rolling Stones.

In April 1964, "Not Fade Away" became their first top 5 hit in the United Kingdom, where it reached number three.

== Personnel ==
The Rolling Stones

- Mick Jagger – vocals, harmonica
- Keith Richards – lead guitar
- Brian Jones – rhythm guitar
- Bill Wyman – bass guitar
- Charlie Watts – drums

Additional personnel

- Ian Stewart – piano (uncredited)
- Phil Spector – maracas
- Gene Pitney – piano
- Andrew Loog Oldham – producer

== Notes and references ==
- Carr, Roy, The Rolling Stones, an Illustrated Record, New English Library, London 1976
