= Norman Weiss =

Norman Weiss was an executive at General Artists Corp., a talent agency, which booked some of the biggest musical groups in the 1960s, including The Beatles for their first tour of America, including their appearance on The Ed Sullivan Show.

Weiss had started a theatrical agency, with partner Roy Gerber, in New York City in the post-World War II 1940s. The pair sold their agency to Music Corporation of America (MCA) in 1953, joining that firm as agents. In the early 1960s, the pair moved to General Artists Corp., where Weiss worked with Brian Epstein, The Beatles' manager, to arranging the band's first American tour, which included The Beatles famous appearances on The Ed Sullivan Show. Other pop music personalities of the 1960s represented by Weiss included The Turtles (in which Weiss's agency is noted as "a despicable record company that sued them for millions of dollars') and Tom Jones, where his influence on Jones's success in America is generally ignored entirely. Nevertheless, Weiss was a force in popular music in the 1960s while at General Artists Corp, although his influence is not generally well understood by the public, it is still remembered by industry insiders, even today.
