= Come On (Chuck Berry song) =

1961 song by Chuck Berry

Single by Chuck Berry
- B-side: "Go Go Go"
- Released: October 1961
- Recorded: 1961
- Studio: Chess Studios (Chicago)
- Genre: Rock and roll
- Length: 1:53
- Label: Chess
- Songwriter: Chuck Berry

Chuck Berry singles chronology
"I'm Talking about You" (1961)	"Come On" (1961)	"Nadine" (1964)

"Come On" is a song written and first released by Chuck Berry in 1961. It has been recorded in many versions by many bands since its release, most notably the Rolling Stones. "Come On" failed to chart in the US top 100, but the B-side, "Go Go Go", reached number 38 on the UK Singles Chart.

== Personnel ==
According to the liner notes from the Berry compilation album The Great Twenty-Eight, the performers on the record were as follows:

- Chuck Berry – lead vocals, guitar
- Johnnie Johnson – piano
- Ebby Harding – drums
- L.C. Davis – tenor saxophone
- Martha Berry – background vocals

== The Rolling Stones version ==
"Come On"

Single by the Rolling Stones
- B-side: "I Want to Be Loved"
- Released: June 7, 1963
- Recorded: May 10, 1963
- Studio: Olympic Studios, Barnes, London
- Genre: Rock and roll; British rhythm and blues
- Length: 1:48
- Label: Decca
- Songwriter: Chuck Berry
- Producer: Andrew Loog Oldham

The Rolling Stones singles chronology
"Come On" (1963)	"I Wanna Be Your Man" (1963)

"Come On" was chosen as the Rolling Stones' debut single. Released in June 1963, it reached number 21 in the UK singles chart. The B-side was the Stones' arrangement of Willie Dixon's "I Want to Be Loved". Both songs were recorded on May 10, 1963. Other songs recorded on that day were "Love Potion No. 9" (unverified) and "Pretty Thing". "Come On" has been released on several compilation albums: More Hot Rocks (Big Hits & Fazed Cookies) (1972), Singles Collection: The London Years (1989) (together with its B-side), Singles 1963-1965 (2004) (together with its B-side), Rolled Gold+: The Very Best of the Rolling Stones (2007), GRRR! (2012) and Stray Cats, a bonus disc available only on The Rolling Stones In Mono box set (together with its B-side).

During the June 6, 2013, concert in Toronto, Canada, as part of the 50 & Counting Tour, Mick Jagger sang a few bars (with Charlie Watts drumming the beat) after mentioning the single being released exactly 50 years ago, the day after that night. It was the first time the song had been heard in any capacity during a Rolling Stones concert since 1965.

=== Personnel ===
- Mick Jagger – lead vocals
- Keith Richards – guitar
- Brian Jones – harmonica, backing vocals
- Bill Wyman – bass guitar, backing vocals
- Charlie Watts – drums

Technical

- Roger Savage – sound engineer
