= Play with Fire (Rolling Stones song) =

- American single picture sleeve

Single by the Rolling Stones
- A-side: "The Last Time"
- Released: 26 February 1965 (UK); 13 March 1965 (US)
- Recorded: 11 January – 18 February 1965
- Studio: RCA, Hollywood, California
- Genre: Baroque pop; chamber pop
- Length: 2:14
- Label: Decca (UK); London (US)
- Songwriter: Nanker Phelge
- Producer: Andrew Loog Oldham

Rolling Stones UK singles chronology
"Little Red Rooster" (1964)	"The Last Time" / "Play with Fire" (1965)	"(I Can't Get No) Satisfaction" (1965)

Rolling Stones US singles chronology
"Heart of Stone" (1964)	"The Last Time" / "Play with Fire" (1965)	"(I Can't Get No) Satisfaction" (1965)

"Play with Fire" is a song by the English rock band the Rolling Stones, originally released as B-side to the song "The Last Time". It was later included on the American release of their 1965 album Out of Our Heads.

== Composition and recording ==
"Play with Fire" is credited to Nanker Phelge, a pseudonym used when tracks were composed by the entire band, even though lead singer Mick Jagger and guitarist Keith Richards are the only Rolling Stones to appear on the track. The song was recorded late one night in January 1965 while the Stones were in Los Angeles recording with Phil Spector at the RCA Studios. Richards performed the song's acoustic guitar opening while Jagger handled vocals and tambourine (enhanced using an echo chamber). Spector played bass on a tuned down acoustic guitar, and Jack Nitzsche provided the song's distinctive harpsichord arrangement and tamtams. The Stones left for a tour of Australia the following day.

The song's lyrics talk of the singer's relationship with a high society girl, disparaging the lifestyle much in the same way that "19th Nervous Breakdown" would with a more up-tempo feel. The title derives from the saying "If you play with fire, you will get burned."

In a 1995 interview with Jann Wenner for Rolling Stone, titled "Jagger Remembers," Jagger said, "'Play with Fire' sounds amazing—when I heard it last. I mean, it's a very in-your-face kind of sound and very clearly done. You can hear all the vocal stuff on it. And I'm playing the tambourines, the vocal line. You know, it's very pretty." According to Richie Unterberger, a friend of the Stones wrote that an unreleased version of the song, entitled "Mess with Fire", was also recorded, featuring a much more upbeat, soul-oriented feel. However, the story is considered dubious by Unterberger. In a contemporary review, Cash Box described it as "a tender, lyrical hauntingly plaintive weeper".

== Releases and lawsuit ==
"Play with Fire" went to No. 96 on the US chart. It was also featured on the US version of Big Hits (High Tide and Green Grass) (1966), Hot Rocks (1971) and Singles Collection: The London Years (1989). The song was performed in concert during the Rolling Stones' tours of 1965 and 1966, and was revived on their 1989–90 Steel Wheels/Urban Jungle Tour.

In July 2008, "Play with Fire" became the subject of a lawsuit when ABKCO Music, which owns the rights to the Rolling Stones' early catalogue, filed a suit against Lil Wayne, asserting that the rapper's song "Playing with Fire" is based on the Rolling Stones' song.

The Rolling Stones' version of the song is featured in the 2007 Wes Anderson film The Darjeeling Limited.

== Personnel ==
- Mick Jagger – lead and harmony vocals, tambourine
- Keith Richards – acoustic guitar
- Jack Nitzsche – harpsichord, tam-tam
- Phil Spector – bass guitar
