= I Wanna Be Your Man =

1963 song written by Lennon–McCartney

- One of the 1963 Danish single covers

Single by the Rolling Stones
- A-side: "Not Fade Away" (US 2nd release)
- B-side: "Stoned" (UK) & (US 1st release)
- Released: 1 November 1963 (UK); March 1964 (US)
- Recorded: 7 October 1963
- Studio: De Lane Lea Studios, London
- Genre: Rock and roll; British R&B
- Length: 1:43
- Label: Decca (UK); London (US)
- Songwriter: Lennon–McCartney
- Producers: Andrew Loog Oldham; Eric Easton

Rolling Stones UK singles chronology
"Come On" (1963)	"I Wanna Be Your Man" (1963)	"Not Fade Away" (1964)

Rolling Stones US singles chronology
"Not Fade Away" / "I Wanna Be Your Man" (1964)	"Tell Me" (1964)

"I Wanna Be Your Man" is a Lennon–McCartney-penned song first recorded and released as a single by the Rolling Stones, and then recorded by the Beatles for their second studio album With the Beatles. The song was primarily written by Paul McCartney, and finished by McCartney with John Lennon in the corner of a Richmond, London, club while Mick Jagger and Keith Richards were talking.

== The Rolling Stones version ==
Released as their second single on 1 November 1963, the Stones' version was the group's first UK top-20 hit, peaking at number 12 on the British chart. Their rendition features Brian Jones's distinctive slide guitar and Bill Wyman's driving bass playing. It is one of the few Rolling Stones songs to feature only Brian Jones on backing vocals. In the US, the song was initially released as London 45-LON 9641 (with "Stoned" on the B-side) without any success and was soon after re-released on 6 March 1964 as the B-side to "Not Fade Away".

According to various accounts, either Andrew Loog Oldham, the Rolling Stones' manager/producer, or the Rolling Stones themselves ran into Lennon and McCartney on the street as the two were returning from an awards luncheon. Hearing that the group were in need of material for a single, Lennon and McCartney went to their session at De Lane Lea Studio and finished off the song – whose verse they had already been working on – in the corner of the room while the impressed Rolling Stones watched.

McCartney stated in 2016:

We were friends with them, and I just thought "I Wanna Be Your Man" would be good for them. I knew they did Bo Diddley stuff. And they made a good job of it.

Bill Wyman noted how the Rolling Stones adapted the song to their style:

We kind of learned it pretty quickly 'cause there wasn't that much to learn. Then Brian got his slide out, his steel (guitar) out and dadaw ... dadaw ... and we said, 'Yeah, that's better, dirty it up a bit and bash it out', and we kind of completely turned the song around and made it much more tough, Stones- and Elmore James-like.

Released only as a single, the Rolling Stones' rendition did not appear on a studio album. The song was reissued in the UK on the Decca compilation albums Milestones (1972) and Rolled Gold: The Very Best of the Rolling Stones (1975). In 1989, it was issued on the US compilation album Singles Collection: The London Years. It is included on the four-CD version of the 2012 GRRR! compilation.

The B-side of the second single was "Stoned", a "Green Onions"–influenced instrumental composed by Nanker/Phelge, the early collective pseudonym for the group. Additionally, it included the "Sixth Stone" pianist Ian Stewart, making it the first released self-penned composition, with added spoken asides by Mick Jagger. Some original 1963 copies were issued with the misprinted title as "Stones", making it doubly collectable as a rarity.

On 1 January 1964, the Stones' "I Wanna Be Your Man" was performed on the first episode of the BBC's Top of the Pops, making them the first band to appear on the show. A performance of the song on The Arthur Haynes Show recorded on 7 February 1964 appears in the 1995 docu-series The Beatles Anthology and as part of the bonus material on the 2012 documentary film Crossfire Hurricane.

== The Beatles version ==
"I Wanna Be Your Man"
- Cover of the song's sheet music

Song by the Beatles

from the album With the Beatles
- Released: 22 November 1963
- Recorded: 11–12, 30 September & 3, 23 October 1963
- Studio: EMI, London
- Genre: Rock and roll
- Length: 1:58
- Label: Parlophone (UK); Capitol (US)
- Songwriter: Lennon–McCartney
- Producer: George Martin

The Beatles' version was sung by Ringo Starr and appeared on the group's second UK album, With the Beatles, released 22 November 1963 and on the US release Meet the Beatles!, released on 20 January 1964. It was driven by a heavily tremoloed, open E-chord on a guitar played through a Vox AC30 amplifier. John Lennon was dismissive of the song in 1980, saying:

It was a throwaway. The only two versions of the song were Ringo and the Rolling Stones. That shows how much importance we put on it: We weren't going to give them anything great, right?

The Beatles also recorded two versions of the song for the BBC. One version was for the Saturday Club, recorded on 7 January 1964 and first broadcast on 15 February. The second version was for the From Us to You show, recorded on 28 February and broadcast on 30 March; this was released decades later on the Live at the BBC collection. The Beatles also recorded a version for the Around The Beatles TV show, recorded on 19 April 1964; this version was released on the Anthology 1 collection in 1995.

=== Personnel ===
- Ringo Starr – vocals, drums, maracas
- John Lennon – backing vocals, rhythm guitar
- Paul McCartney – backing vocals, bass
- George Harrison – lead guitar
- George Martin – Hammond organ

== Live versions ==
The Beatles played the song during their touring years as a band, and it remained a staple of their live shows from 1964 to 1966. Their final performance of the song was during their last ticketed concert at Candlestick Park in San Francisco on August 29, 1966.

=== Ringo Starr and the All-Starr Band version ===
Ringo Starr & His All-Starr Band have performed the song as a concert staple during their 1989 through 2012–13 All-Starr Band concerts. The song was on the setlist for the first line-up in 1989. The 1992 line-up did not perform the song. Every All-Starr Band line-up from 1995 to 2012–13 has included the song on their setlist. The song has appeared on the following compilation albums: Ringo Starr and His Third All-Starr Band Volume 1, King Biscuit Flower Hour Presents Ringo & His New All-Starr Band, The Anthology... So Far, Ringo Starr and Friends, Ringo Starr: Live at Soundstage, Ringo Starr & His All Starr Band Live 2006, and Live at the Greek Theatre 2008.

=== Paul McCartney version ===
McCartney performed the song occasionally, notably on the soundcheck of his 1993 live album Paul Is Live.

McCartney performed the song in his 2022 Glastonbury Festival set with special guest Bruce Springsteen.

=== X-Pensive Winos version ===
Keith Richards performed the song live with his group, the X-Pensive Winos, during their 1988 Talk is Cheap tour of the US. They performed the song at the Orpheum Theatre in Boston, at the Universal Amphitheater in Los Angeles, the Brendan Byrne Arena in East Rutherford, New Jersey, and at the Hollywood Palladium.

== Other recordings ==
The song was parodied in 1964 by the Barron Knights on their hit single "Call Up the Groups (Medley)" (Columbia DB.7317), in which they imitated the Rolling Stones' version. It was also recorded by Les Baronets in French as "Oh! Je Veux Être À Toi" in 1964, Adam Faith in 1965, Count Basie and his Orchestra in 1966, the Day Brothers, Terry Manning in 1970, Suzi Quatro in 1973, the Rezillos in 1977, Roger Webb and his Trio, the Sparrows, the Merseyboys, Bob Leaper, the Flamin' Groovies in 1993, Sam Phillips in 2003, Audience in 2005, the Rockin' Ramrods, the Smithereens in 2007, and the Stooges on their 2007 album The Weirdness featuring Iggy Pop.

=== Homages ===
Bob Dylan recorded a song for Blonde on Blonde (1966) called "I Wanna Be Your Lover" as a "tip of the hat" to the Lennon/McCartney song. It was left off the final album but was eventually released on the compilation boxed set Biograph (1985).I Wanna Be Your Lover shares the lyric:

I wanna be your lover, baby, I wanna be your man.

This refrain is also used in the 1977 the Saints song Erotic Neurotic.

The song contains a heavy Bo Diddley beat. This was acknowledged by Bo Diddley himself in the song "London Stomp" from the album Hey! Good Lookin'. He sings "Hey, Liverpool, we got the London Stomp" over an "I Wanna Be Your Man" background.

== Personnel ==
=== Rolling Stones version ===
According to authors Andy Babiuk and Greg Prevost:

- Mick Jagger – lead vocal
- Brian Jones – backing vocals, lead slide guitar
- Keith Richards – rhythm guitar
- Bill Wyman – bass
- Charlie Watts – drums

=== Beatles version ===
According to author Ian MacDonald:

The Beatles

- Ringo Starr – double-tracked vocal, drums, maracas
- John Lennon – backing vocal, rhythm guitar
- Paul McCartney – backing vocal, bass
- George Harrison – lead guitar
- Uncredited (played by the Beatles) – tambourine

Additional musician

- George Martin – Hammond organ (Note: According to the liner notes for With The Beatles, John Lennon performs the Hammond organ part.)

== Sources ==
=== References ===
- Babiuk, Andy; Prevost, Greg (2013). Rolling Stones Gear: All the Stones' Instruments from Stage to Studio. Milwaukee: Backbeat Books. ISBN 978-1-61713-092-2.
- Eder, Bruce (2009). "Review of "I Wanna Be Your Man/Stoned"". AllMusic.
- Gilliland, John (1969). "The British Are Coming! The British Are Coming!: The U.S.A. is invaded by a wave of long-haired English rockers". Pop Chronicles. Digital.library.unt.edu. Archived from the original on 9 July 2017.
- Lewisohn, Mark (1988). The Beatles Recording Sessions. New York: Harmony Books. ISBN 0-517-57066-1.
- MacDonald, Ian (2005). Revolution in the Head: The Beatles' Records and the Sixties (Second Revised ed.). London: Pimlico (Rand). ISBN 1-84413-828-3.
- Miles, Barry (1997). Paul McCartney: Many Years From Now. New York: Henry Holt and Company. ISBN 0-8050-5249-6.
- Sheff, David (2000). All We Are Saying. St Martin's Griffin. ISBN 0-312-25464-4.
- Winn, John C. (2008). Way Beyond Compare: The Beatles' Recorded Legacy, Volume One, 1957–1965. New York: Three Rivers Press. ISBN 978-0-307-45157-6. Archived from the original on 21 November 2021.
