= Nanker Phelge =

Collective pseudonym used by the Rolling Stones for group compositions

Nanker Phelge (also known as Nanker-Phelge) was a collective pseudonym used between 1963 and 1965 for several Rolling Stones group compositions. According to manager Andrew Loog Oldham the 'Nanker Phelge' credit was mostly used for tracks where the origin lay in blues standards from the 1950s they heard when visiting the Chess studios in Chicago. It also enabled Oldham to benefit from writing credits.

Stones bassist Bill Wyman explained the origins of the name in his 2002 book, Rolling with the Stones:

When the Stones cut "Stoned" – or "Stones", according to early misprinted pressings – as the B-side to "I Wanna Be Your Man", Brian [Jones] suggested crediting it to Nanker Phelge. The entire band would share writing royalties. Phelge came from Edith Grove flatmate Jimmy Phelge, while a Nanker was a revolting face that band members, Brian in particular, would pull.

Thus anything credited to Nanker Phelge refers to a Mick Jagger/Brian Jones/Keith Richards/Charlie Watts/Bill Wyman/Andrew Loog Oldham collaborative composition. The ASCAP files for the very earliest Nanker Phelge compositions also list early Rolling Stones member Ian Stewart (also known as "the sixth Stone") as a co-author covered by the pseudonym.

The name resurfaced in the late 1960s on the labels of the original vinyl pressings of Beggars Banquet and Let It Bleed. Manufacture of both albums was credited to Nanker Phelge, which was then acknowledged as an ABKCO company (ABKCO was manufacturing the records that still bore the London and Decca labels).

== Songs credited to Nanker Phelge ==
- "Stoned" (Oct. 1963) (ASCAP also credits Ian Stewart as co-writer)
- "Little by Little" (Feb. 1964) (credited as 'Phelge') (co-written with Phil Spector; ASCAP also credits Ian Stewart as co-writer)
- "Andrew's Blues" (Feb. 1964) (unreleased)
- "And Mr. Spector and Mr. Pitney Came Too" (Feb. 1964) (an instrumental blues-rock jam with prominent harmonica, unreleased, co-written with Phil Spector) Appears on the Black Box bootleg compilation.
- "Now I've Got a Witness" (credited as 'Phelge') (Apr. 1964)
- "Stewed and Keefed (Brian's Blues)" (Jun. 1964)
- "2120 South Michigan Avenue" (Aug. 1964)
- "Empty Heart" (Aug. 1964)
- "Off the Hook" (Nov. 1964) (originally credited to "Nanker, Phelge", but now credited to Jagger/Richards by BMI)
- "Play with Fire" (Feb. 1965)
- "The Under Assistant West Coast Promotion Man" (May 1965)
- "The Spider and the Fly" (July 1965) (originally credited to "Nanker, Phelge" but now credited to Jagger/Richards by BMI)
- "I'm All Right" (July 1965) (sometimes credited to Phelge/McDaniel, although it is an Ellas McDaniel cover song. Now credited to Ellas McDaniel)
- "Godzi" (unreleased but registered with BMI)
- "We Want the Stones" (a recording of the audience cheering on the 1965 Got Live If You Want It! EP)
- Bill Wyman claims in his books that "Paint It Black" was a collective effort of the group, and should have been credited to Nanker Phelge, but he didn't know why it was credited to Jagger/Richards.

== See also ==
- Jagger/Richards
