= Not Fade Away (song) =

1957 single by The Crickets

Single by the Crickets

from the album The "Chirping" Crickets
- A-side: "Oh, Boy!"
- Released: October 27, 1957
- Recorded: August 1957
- Studio: Norman Petty Recording Studios (Clovis, New Mexico)
- Genre: Rock and roll; rockabilly
- Length: 2:21
- Label: Brunswick
- Songwriters: Charles Hardin a.k.a. Buddy Holly; Norman Petty (credited)
- Producer: Norman Petty

The Crickets singles chronology
"That'll Be the Day" (1957)	"Not Fade Away" (1957)	"Maybe Baby" (1958)

"Not Fade Away" is a 1957 song recorded and released by The Crickets in 1957 on Brunswick Records. It was the B side to "Oh, Boy!".

The Rolling Stones covered the song in 1964 and released it as their first single in the U.S. It reached no. 3 in the UK.

== Original song ==
It is credited to Buddy Holly (originally under his first and middle names, Charles Hardin) and Norman Petty (although Petty's co-writing credit is likely to have been a formality) and first recorded by Buddy Holly with his band The Crickets.

Holly and the Crickets recorded the song at the Norman Petty Recording Studios in Clovis, New Mexico, on May 27, 1957, the same day the song "Everyday" was recorded. The rhythmic pattern of "Not Fade Away" is a variant of the Bo Diddley beat, with the second stress occurring on the second rather than third beat of the first measure, which was an update of the "hambone" rhythm, or patted juba from West Africa. Jerry Allison, the drummer for the Crickets, pounded out the beat on a cardboard box. Allison, Holly's best friend, wrote some of the lyrics, though his name never appeared in the songwriting credits. Joe Mauldin played the double bass on this recording. It is likely that the backing vocalists were Holly, Allison, and Niki Sullivan, but this is not known for certain.

"Not Fade Away" was originally released as the B-side of the hit single "Oh, Boy!" and was included on the album The "Chirping" Crickets (1957). The Crickets' recording never charted as a single. In 2004, this song was ranked number 107 on Rolling Stone's list of "The 500 Greatest Songs of All Time".

== Personnel ==
Buddy Holly and the Crickets

- Buddy Holly – lead vocals, lead guitar, backing vocals
- Jerry Allison – drums, card-box percussion
- Joe B. Mauldin – contrabass
- Niki Sullivan – backing vocals

== The Rolling Stones version ==
"Not Fade Away"
- US picture sleeve

Single by the Rolling Stones
- B-side: "Little by Little" (UK); "I Wanna Be Your Man" (US)
- Released: February 21, 1964 (UK); March 6, 1964 (US)
- Recorded: January 10, 1964
- Studio: Olympic, London
- Genre: Rock and roll; blues rock
- Length: 1:50
- Label: Decca (UK); London (US)
- Songwriters: Charles Hardin a.k.a. Buddy Holly; Norman Petty
- Producer: Andrew Loog Oldham

Rolling Stones UK singles chronology
"I Wanna Be Your Man" (1963)	"Not Fade Away" (1964)	"It's All Over Now" (1964)

Rolling Stones US singles chronology
"Not Fade Away" (1964)	"Tell Me" (1964)

The Rolling Stones' version of "Not Fade Away" was one of their first hits. Recorded in January 1964 and released by Decca Records on February 21, 1964, with "Little by Little" as the B-side, it was their first Top 10 hit in the United Kingdom, reaching number three. London Records released the song in the US on March 6, 1964, as the band's first single there, with "I Wanna Be Your Man" as the B-side. The single reached number 48 on the US Billboard Hot 100 singles chart. It also reached number 44 on the Cash Box pop singles chart in the US and number 33 in Australia based on the Kent Music Report. "Not Fade Away" was not on the UK version of their debut album, The Rolling Stones, but was the opening track of the US version, released a month later as England's Newest Hit Makers. It can also be found on the UK version of their 1966 compilation album Big Hits (High Tide and Green Grass). Cash Box described it as "a wild, freewheeling full-sounding pounder that can take off in no time flat". It was a mainstay of the band's concerts in their early years, usually opening the shows. It was revived as the opening song in the band's Voodoo Lounge Tour, in 1994 and 1995.

=== Personnel ===
According to authors Philippe Margotin and Jean-Michel Guesdon, except where noted:

- Mick Jagger – double tracked lead vocal, hand claps, tambourine, maracas (Note: In a July 1964 issue of Rolling Stones Monthly, the Stones' manager and producer Andrew Loog Oldham stated that American producer Phil Spector played maracas on the track. Wyman later disputed this account, suggesting Oldham created the story to increase the song's publicity. While Spector was present at some of the band's sessions, including on 28 January and 4 February 1964, they recorded "Not Fade Away" on 10 January 1964. Both Margotin & Guesdon and authors Andy Babiuk & Greg Prevost write Jagger contributed maracas.)
- Keith Richards – twelve-string acoustic guitar, lead guitar
- Brian Jones – harmonica
- Bill Wyman – bass
- Charlie Watts – drums

=== Charts ===
Chart (1964)	Peak position
Australia (Kent Music Report)	33
Canada (CHUM Chart)	22
Ireland (IRMA)	5
Sweden (Kvällstoppen)	17
UK Singles (Official Charts)	3
US Billboard Hot 100	48
US Cash Box Top 100	44
US Record World Top 100	58

== Other cover versions ==
- The song is closely associated with the Grateful Dead as one of their signature tunes—one which the band transformed from Holly's 1950s boy/girl romanticism to one reflecting the 1960s' more spiritual universal love. Their 1971 recording of the song is included on their eponymous second live album. Another version of the song is included on Rare Cuts and Oddities 1966 (2005). The Dead first performed it live on February 19, 1969, at the Carousel Ballroom, San Francisco, California, and subsequently performed it more than 600 more times before the group disbanded in 1995, following the death of lead guitarist Jerry Garcia. The surviving members (except Tom Constanten and Donna Jean Godchaux) reunited and played the song for the last time all together as the last song of the second set (VC before the encores) on the last night of Fare Thee Well: Celebrating 50 Years of the Grateful Dead. The song continued to be played by later iterations of the band, including the Other Ones, the Dead, and most recently Dead & Company.
- Bobby Fuller released a recording in 1962 as a 45 single on Eastwood Records.
- The Everly Brothers recorded the song on their 1972 album Pass the Chicken & Listen.
- Black Oak Arkansas as Black Oak released the song on their 1977 album Race With the Devil.
- Rush recorded a version of "Not Fade Away" as their debut single in 1973, which peaked at number 88 in Canada. The single was released on the band's own Moon Records label, and is considered a rare collector's item. "Not Fade Away" and the B-side "You Can't Fight It" were reissued on the 2025 compilation album Rush 50.
- Stephen Stills released a version on his 1978 album Thoroughfare Gap.
- Tanya Tucker included a funky, rock-and-roll version of "Not Fade Away" on her album, TNT (1978). Tucker's cover of this song peaked at number 70 on the US Billboard pop singles chart in 1979.
- Florence and the Machine recorded a version of the song in 2010.
- Former Beatles drummer Pete Best released a version on the 1999 album Casbah Coffee Club.
- Stevie Nicks contributed a cover of "Not Fade Away" for the tribute album Listen to Me: Buddy Holly released in September 2011.
- John Scofield covered the song on his eponymous 2022 solo album.
- The Byrds also performed this cover during their act on the show Shindig! in 1965.
