= Andrew Loog Oldham =

English record producer, talent manager, impresario and author (born 1944)

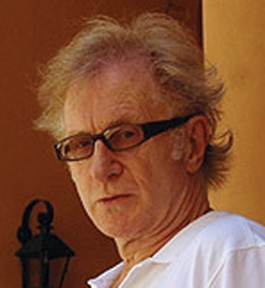
- Oldham, c. 2010

Background information
- Born: 29 January 1944 (age 82)
- Origin: London, England
- Occupations: Record producer; manager; impresario; author

Andrew Loog Oldham (Note: Sources are inconsistent regarding whether the surname is Oldham or double-barrelled Loog Oldham. This article uses Oldham, based on the sources referred to in the main text, plus these:) (born 29 January 1944) is an English record producer, talent manager, impresario and author. He was manager and producer of the Rolling Stones from 1963 to 1967, and was noted for his flamboyant style.

== Early life ==
Oldham's father, Andrew Loog, was a United States Army Air Force lieutenant, a New Orleanian of German descent, who served with the Eighth Air Force. Loog was killed in June 1943 when his B-17 bomber was shot down over the English Channel, and he was buried at the Ardennes American Cemetery and Memorial in Belgium. Oldham's Australian-born mother, Celia Oldham, was a nurse and comptometer operator. Oldham attended the Aylesbury School for Boys, Cokethorpe School in Oxfordshire, St Marylebone Grammar School and Wellingborough School in Northamptonshire.

A self-proclaimed hustler, Oldham spent teenage summers swindling tourists in French towns. His interest in the pop culture of the 1960s and the Soho coffeehouse scene led to working for Carnaby Street mod designer John Stephen and later as an assistant to then-emerging fashion designer Mary Quant. Oldham became a publicist for British and American musicians and for producer Joe Meek. Among his projects were stints publicising both Bob Dylan (on his first UK visit) and the Beatles (for Brian Epstein) in early 1963.

== The Rolling Stones ==
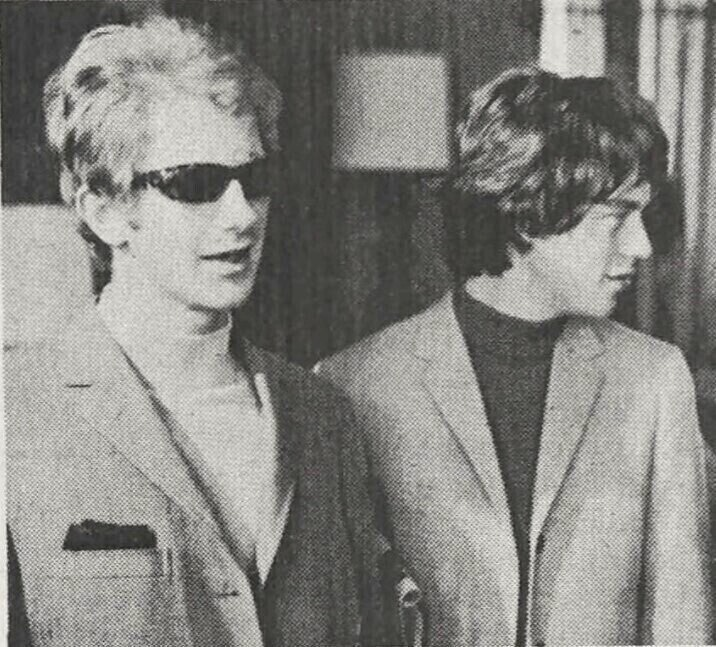
Oldham (left) with Mick Jagger, c. 1966

In April 1963, a journalist friend recommended that Oldham see a young R&B band named the Rolling Stones. Oldham saw potential in the group being positioned as an "anti-Beatles"—a rougher group compared to the "cuddly moptop" image of the Beatles at that time. Oldham, still a teenager, rapidly acquired a seasoned business partner (Eric Easton) and took over management of the Stones who had been informally represented by Giorgio Gomelsky. Oldham had previously been business partners with Peter Meaden, first manager of the Who, but they had fallen out after getting into several fights. Oldham signed recording rights to the Stones to Decca, targeting A&R head Dick Rowe, who had earlier declined to sign the Beatles.

Among strategies devised and executed by Oldham to propel the group to success:

- reassigning Ian Stewart from onstage keyboard player in May 1963 to studio-only play. This was to keep their public appearance as a five-man group of slender young men; Oldham said words to the effect that "the kids can't count to six" and Stewart was three to five years older than four of the five band members. (Although Bill Wyman was almost two years older than Stewart, no-one knew this at the time. Wyman, who wrote for some of the Stones' early fanzines, even dubbed himself the youngest member. His true age was not revealed until around the time of the band's highly successful 1969 American tour.). Stewart stayed on as the road manager and continued to contribute keyboard parts to the band's recordings and live performances, and remained an influence.
- encouraging Mick Jagger to be the front man, and to take the spotlight off leader Brian Jones.
- bringing John Lennon and Paul McCartney to the recording studio, which led to their song "I Wanna Be Your Man" becoming the Rolling Stones' second single;
- encouraging Mick Jagger and Keith Richards to start writing their own songs ("As Tears Go By" was their first);
- promoting a "bad boy" image for the Rolling Stones, in contrast to the Beatles. Oldham generated widely reprinted headlines like "Would You Let Your Sister Go with a Rolling Stone?" and provocative album-cover notes, such as a satirical incitement to fans to mug a blind beggar for funds to buy the album:
  Cast deep in your pockets for loot to buy this disc of groovies and fancy words. If you don't have bread, see that blind man, knock him on the head, steal his wallet and low and behold you have the loot, if you put in the boot, good, another one sold!
  — Andrew Loog Oldham
  This quote can be found on the top right on the back of some issues of The Rolling Stones No. 2 LP.

Oldham and Eric Easton negotiated a recording contract which was very favourable to themselves. Instead of having the Stones sign directly with Decca they set up a company, Impact Sound, which retained ownership of the group's master tapes, which were then leased to Decca — an idea learned from Phil Spector. Impact Sound received a 14% royalty from Decca but paid only 6% to the Stones, out of which Oldham and Eric Easton received a 25% management fee.

Oldham produced all Rolling Stones recordings from 1963 until late 1967 despite having no previous experience as a producer. According to the Rolling Stones' website, accounts regarding the value of his musical input to the Stones recordings vary "from negligible to absolute zero". Though lacking technical expertise in the studio, it is thought that Oldham was good at seeing the "big picture" of the Rolling Stones' image and sound. He discovered Marianne Faithfull at a party, giving her Jagger and Richards' "As Tears Go By" to record. He also developed other studio talent with his Andrew Oldham Orchestra, in which Rolling Stones as well as London session players (including Steve Marriott on harmonica) recorded pop covers and instrumentals. As his success increased, Oldham thrived on a reputation as a garrulous, androgynous gangster who wore makeup and sunglasses and relied on his bodyguard Reg 'The Butcher' King to threaten rivals.

Oldham put an advert in Melody Maker that praised the Righteous Brothers' version of "You've Lost That Lovin' Feelin'" in an effort to detract attention and sales from Cilla Black's competing version.

In 1965, Oldham hired Allen Klein as his business manager. On Oldham's behalf Klein renegotiated the Rolling Stones' contract with Decca, excluding Oldham's partner, Eric Easton. However, over the following two years Oldham's relations with the Stones were strained by his drug use and inattention to the group's needs. When Jagger and Richards were arrested for drug possession in 1967, instead of devising a strategy for their legal defence and public relations, Oldham fled to the United States, leaving Klein to deal with the problem. Oldham was forced to resign as manager of the Rolling Stones in late 1967, and sold his rights to the group's music to Allen Klein the following year.

== Immediate Records ==
In 1965, Oldham set up Immediate Records, among the first independent labels in the UK. Among the artists that he signed and/or produced or guided were PP Arnold, Chris Farlowe, the Small Faces, John Mayall & the Bluesbreakers, Rod Stewart, the Nice, Jimmy Page, Nico, Jeff Beck, Eric Clapton, Amen Corner, the McCoys, the Strangeloves, Humble Pie and Duncan Browne.

With Arthur Greenslade he was credited as the co-writer of "Headlines", the B-side of "Ride on Baby" (IM 038), by Chris Farlowe, which was released in October 1966.

After the Small Faces disbanded in 1969, he put together Humble Pie, featuring Steve Marriott (formerly of the Small Faces) and Peter Frampton (formerly of the Herd).

In the 1970s and 1980s, Oldham worked primarily in the United States. He produced Donovan, Gene Pitney and other artists. In the mid-1980s, he made Colombia his home after marrying Esther Farfan, a Colombian model. There he briefly worked with some Colombian bands.

== Later career ==
A recording by the Andrew Oldham Orchestra was rediscovered in the 1990s when the Verve used a string loop based on the orchestral arrangement of the Rolling Stones song "The Last Time" in their song "Bitter Sweet Symphony"; in the ensuing court battle, songwriting royalties for the Verve track were awarded to Allen Klein's ABKCO Records, the owner of the copyright for "The Last Time". They would later revert back to The Verve frontman Richard Ashcroft.

Oldham co-wrote a biography of ABBA in the 1990s and three autobiographies: Stoned (1998), 2Stoned (2001), and Rolling Stoned (2011) in which he and other music figures recount his days as a manager, producer and impresario. He was inducted into Rock and Roll Hall of Fame in 2014.

In 2005, Oldham thanked the Scientology-linked drug rehab organisation Narconon for saving his life from his cocaine addiction. In the same year he was recruited by Steven Van Zandt to host a radio show on Van Zandt's Underground Garage radio channel heard in North America on Sirius Satellite Radio. Oldham had a three-hour show on weekdays and a four-hour weekend show. In 2006 he collaborated with renowned Argentine musician Charly García for his album Kill Gil, which was eventually released in a slightly reworked form in 2010. In 2008, he worked on the production of a new album by Argentine rock band Los Ratones Paranoicos.

In 2014, Oldham overheard Canadian artist Ché Aimee Dorval singing backup on a friend's track he was helping to produce, and he subsequently signed her to his label. In September 2014, Oldham's label released Dorval's second studio EP, Volume One. She was also given two covers to sing on his 2013 album of Rolling Stones songs entitled Andrew Oldham Orchestra and Friends play the Rolling Stones Songbook Vol. 2. Dorval sang "As Tears Go By" and "Under My Thumb".

In 2020, he began his first lectures as a visiting Scholar at Thompson Rivers University in British Columbia, Canada.

== "Andrew's Blues" ==
The song "Andrew's Blues", sung by the Rolling Stones and appearing on the bootleg Black Box collection CD1, is a humorous if scathing evocation of Oldham.

== Personal life ==
In August 1964 he was quoted in the London Evening Standard saying that he wanted 'to settle down and marry a girl called Sheila'. This took place the following month, when he and Sheila Klein were married in Glasgow on the 16 September. They had known each other for over two years. Oldham told Maureen Cleave: 'I don't know that she has any special qualities, but she's just right for me.'

Oldham has two sons, the elder from his marriage to Sheila Klein, and the younger from his marriage to Esther Farfan.

== Bibliography ==
- Stoned: A Memoir of London in the 1960s.
- 2Stoned.
- Stone Free.
- Rolling Stoned.
- On Hustling: Trailblazers, Hustlers and Revolutionaries: People Who Changed Their Worlds
- ABBA: The Name of the Game (Andrew Loog Oldham - co-writer)
- Motown: The Sound of Young America. Adam White, Barney Ales (foreword by Andrew Loog Oldham)
- Exposed: The Faces of Rock N' Roll. Mick Rock (afterword by Andrew Loog Oldham)
- Immediate: The Rise and Fall of the UK's First Independent Record Label. Simon Spence (introduction by Andrew Loog Oldham)
- The Stones: 65-67. Gered Mankowitz (foreword by Andrew Loog Oldham)
- Satisfaction: The Rolling Stones Photographs of Gered Mankowitz. Gered Mankowitz (foreword by Andrew Loog Oldham)
- Goin’ Home with the Rolling Stones '66: Photographs by Gered Mankowitz. Gered Mankowitz (foreword by Andrew Loog Oldham)
- Bob Crewe: Sight and Sound: Compositions in Art and Music. Donald Albrecht, Jessica May, Andrew Loog Oldham, Peter Plagens

== Sources ==
- Goodman, Fred (2015). Allen Klein: The Man Who Bailed Out the Beatles, Made the Stones, and Transformed Rock & Roll. New York: Houghton Mifflin Harcourt. ISBN 978-0-547-89686-1.
