= Hindsight (TV series) =

2015 American comedy-drama television series

- Genre: Romantic comedy; Fantasy; Science fiction
- Created by: Emily Fox
- Starring: Laura Ramsey; Sarah Goldberg; Craig Horner; Nick Clifford; John Patrick Amedori; Jessy Hodges; Drew Sidora
- Opening theme: "In the Meantime" by Spacehog
- Composer: Stephen Endelman
- Country of origin: United States
- Original language: English
- No. of seasons: 1
- No. of episodes: 10

Production
- Executive producers: Emily Fox; John A. Norris; Alexander A. Motlagh; Maggie Malina
- Producers: Lenn K. Rosenfeld; Meredith Philpott
- Running time: 44 minutes
- Production companies: POPFilms; Timberman-Beverly Productions; Sony Pictures Television; In Cahoots Media; VH1 Television

Original release
- Network: VH1
- Release: January 7 – March 11, 2015

Hindsight is an American comedy-drama television series that premiered on VH1 on January 7, 2015, and ended on March 11, 2015. The series was created by Emily Fox and stars Laura Ramsey in the lead role of Becca Brady. Becca wishes she had lived her life differently, and finds herself sent back to 1995, with her knowledge and experience and a chance to do things differently.

On March 16, 2015, VH1 announced that the show was renewed for a second season, but after a change in leadership at VH1 Hindsight was cancelled in August 2015.

== Plot ==
Becca Brady is wrestling with doubts on the eve of her second wedding, her first wedding having ended in divorce. Although she loves her fiancé Andy, he is not as exciting as her first husband Sean. Trapped in the elevator she wishes she could have done things differently the first time round. She awakes to find herself in New York City in 1995, confused and at first not even believing it is real; Becca has time traveled to the day of her first wedding. Becca realizes she is reliving her life, and has the chance to correct what she sees as personal and professional mistakes.

She reunites with her best friend Lolly, from whom she had become estranged in present day. With the knowledge that her first marriage turned from passion to constant arguments and that Sean never managed to achieve in his career as an artist, she decides she cannot go through with the wedding and she breaks off her engagement. Becca also knows her job as an assistant is a dead end and decides not to tolerate the constant petty demands of her high-maintenance boss Simon, and asks for promotion. Ultimately she quits and pursues a new uncertain career path.

Becca does not know if she can change her fate, or if she is destined to repeat some of the same mistakes, but she resolves to try and do things differently.

== Production ==
The series was originally developed for NBC in 2009. VH1 were looking to develop their own scripted television series and were looking to adopt already developed projects, and the show only required a small changes to fit VH1. The time leap had originally been to 1999, but was pushed back to 1995 when the show moved to VH1.

The series was renewed for a second season but later cancelled after a change in leadership at VH1. The whole of the second season had already been mapped out, and the writers were in the process of writing episode five. Fox said they had only ended season 1 on a cliffhanger because they already knew that had been renewed.

The show included a companion web series called Planet Sebastian. It was streamed on the VH1 website and featured recurring character Sebastian Wexler, video store manager and Lolly's boss, running his own public access style talk show.

== Cast ==
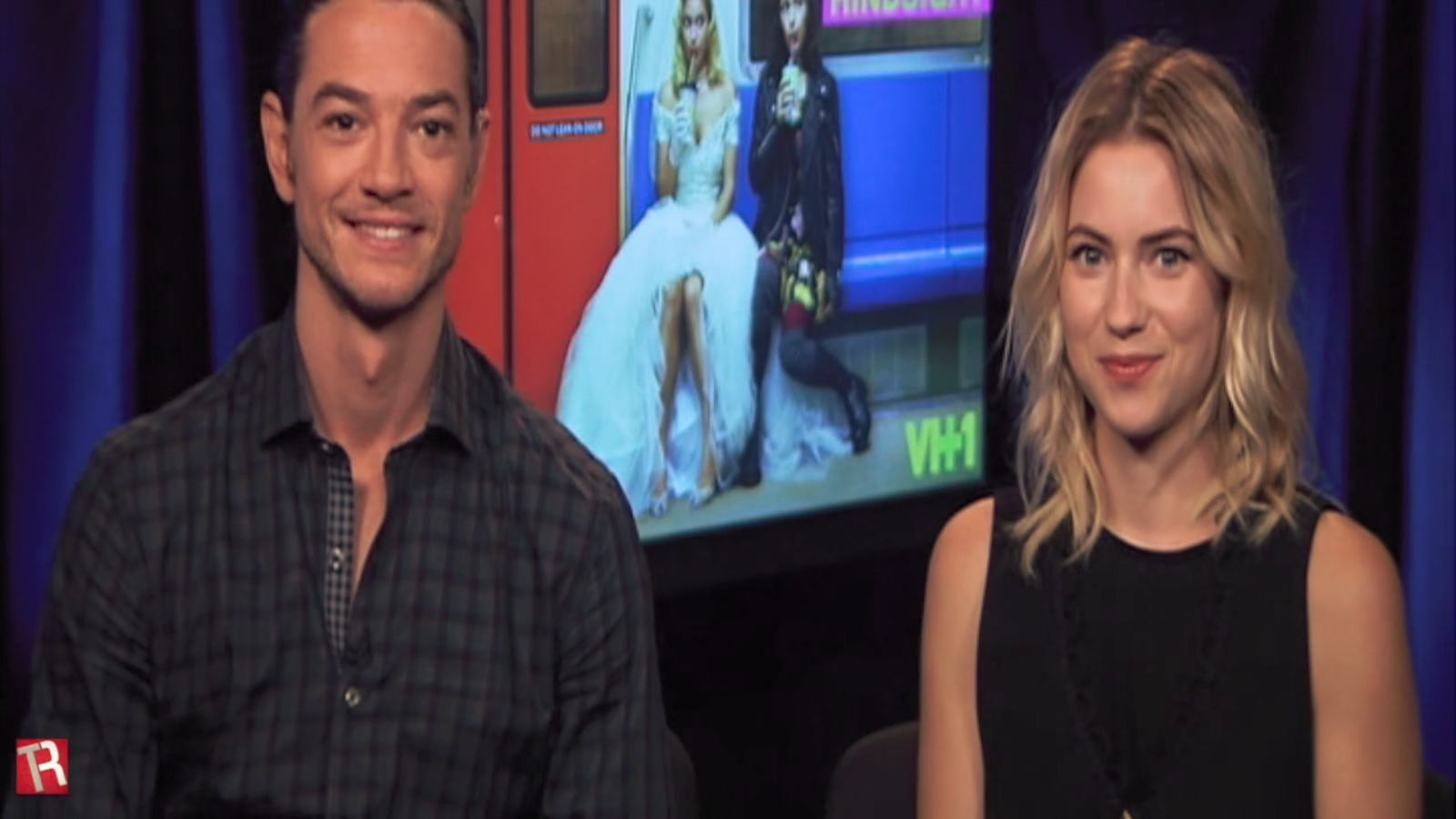
Craig Horner and Laura Ramsey discuss Hindsight in 2015

Main

- Laura Ramsey as Rebecca "Becca" Brady
- Sarah Goldberg as Lolly Lavigne
- Craig Horner as Sean Reeves
- Nick Clifford as Andrew "Andy" Kelly
- John Patrick Amedori as James "Jamie" Brady
- Jessy Hodges as Melanie Morelli
- Drew Sidora as Paige Hill

Recurring

- Donna Murphy as Georgia "Georgie" Brady
- Adam Herschman as Sebastian Wexler
- Collins Pennie as Xavier
- Alexandra Chando as Noelle
- Steve Talley as Kevin
- Joshua Mikel as Stanton
- Brian Kerwin as Lincoln Brady
- Lauren Boyd as Lois
- Liz Holtan as Phoebe
- Briana Venskus as Victoria
- Charlie Bodin as Chester
- Dominick Vicchiullo as Grumpy Rick

Guest

- Mario Cantone as Simon

== Episodes ==
No.	Title	Directed by	Written by	Original release date	US viewers (millions)
1	"Pilot"	Michael Trim	Emily Fox	January 7, 2015	0.367
After having second thoughts the night before her second wedding, Becca finds herself back on October 8, 1995, the day of her first wedding. When she arrives, she breaks off her engagement to her first husband and reunites with her best friend. She uses this time travel to correct past mistakes.
2	"Square One"	Michael Trim	Emily Fox	January 14, 2015	0.226
As Becca continues to adjust to life in 1995, she finds herself facing situations that she knows the outcome of. In an effort to avoid repeating mistakes, she quits her job and promises to stop meddling in Lolly and Jamie’s relationship. She also continues to deal with her feelings for Sean and Andy.
3	"I Never..."	Michael Trim	John A. Norris	January 21, 2015	0.298
A girl’s night out finds Becca contemplating a one-night stand and being pressured by Lolly to reveal why the two of them become estranged in the future. Becca also begins to fear that her attempts to alter her destiny may have changed the future in a negative way for a family member.
4	"A Very Important Date"	Jonathan Frakes	Mike Herro & David Strauss	January 28, 2015	0.320
Becca’s redo of Halloween 1995 leads to the discovery that Sean is now involved with Paige. Melanie finally confronts Becca and Andy about the kiss they shared. Meanwhile, Lolly becomes increasingly troubled by Jamie’s behavior while also learning some frightening details about their break-up in the future. Becca begins a new job.
5	"...Then I'll Know"	Jonathan Frakes	Lenn K. Rosenfeld	February 4, 2015	0.280
Everything that can go wrong does go wrong as Becca, Lolly, and Paige head out on a road trip. Still, when the dust settles everything seems to have worked out. Becca and Paige bond while Lolly takes some tentative first steps toward repairing her relationship with her father. Becca even seems to decide she is ready to pursue a relationship with Andy. Then tragedy strikes.
6	"Tragic Kingdom"	Tara Nicole Weyr	Meredith Philpott	February 11, 2015	0.284
As Andy recovers from his car accident, Becca begins to question whether a relationship between them will cause him more harm than good. Ultimately, she decides it will be best for him if she lets him go. Lolly breaks up with Jamie while Sean and Paige grow closer. Becca turns to Sean for comfort.
7	"The Cranberries"	Tara Nicole Weyr	Kenny Neibart	February 18, 2015	0.175
Everyone gathers at Becca’s parents’ house for Thanksgiving. The day’s events force Becca to rethink her plans for changing her destiny. Sean decides he and Becca shouldn’t get back together while Andy and Melanie get engaged. Meanwhile, Jamie leaves for the Dominican Republic to buy drugs, a trip that led to his downward spiral in the future. At the end of the night, Kevin visits Lolly and introduces himself to Becca for the first time, though it's clear that he's someone that she knows from the future.
8	"The Imaginary Line"	Bradley Walsh	John A. Norris	February 25, 2015	0.205
A night out with Becca and Kevin finds Lolly struggling to find the courage to tell Kevin how she feels about him. The night’s events also force Becca to reflect on the most severe of her mistakes in the future. In 2003, she sleeps with Kevin behind Lolly’s back. This turns out to be the event that severs her friendship with Lolly. As the night goes on, Becca tries to avoid Kevin while growing more fearful the future will repeat itself. Meanwhile, Sean meets an art dealer who is interested in him both personally and professionally.
9	"All I Want for Christmas is You"	Bradley Walsh	Mike Herro & David Strauss	March 4, 2015	0.227
Lolly finally tells Kevin how she feels about him but he doesn’t return her feelings. Becca throws a Christmas party to cheer Lolly up and to celebrate her magazine's success. After finding out that Noelle isn’t who she seems to be, Sean reconnects with Paige. Jamie appears to have cleaned his act up but it’s all a front. He is secretly dealing drugs. As the evening ends, Kevin kisses Becca which opens up the possibility that Becca and Lolly’s friendship is destined to be destroyed again.
10	"Auld Lang Syne"	Roger Kumble	Emily Fox	March 11, 2015	0.249
Lolly sees Becca and Kevin kissing but, after her initial shock, she gives her blessing to their relationship. Sean sells some of his paintings while Paige gets a part in a movie. They realize they have to put the brakes on their relationship, though, as Paige must move to Los Angeles for her acting role. Andy and Melanie get married. Jamie's drug problems hit dangerously close to home. The crisis, however, brings him and Lolly closer. All seems well between Becca and Lolly until Lolly finds out why their friendship ends in the future. This revelation causes her to end the friendship again, prompting a desperate move on Becca's part. Hoping to escape the damage her trip back in time has caused, Becca attempts to time travel again. She recreates the original event that brought her to the past by getting on an elevator again. The episode ends on an ambiguous note, leaving it unclear whether Becca is back in the present day or still stuck in the past.

== Reception ==
On Rotten Tomatoes it has an approval rating of 100% based on reviews from 12 critics, with an average rating of 7.5 out of 10. The site's critical consensus states: "An earnest sense of humor, excellent characters, and 90s nostalgia all work together to make Hindsight a fun and charming little romp." On Metacritic, the series has a score of 72 out of 100 based on reviews from 8 critics, indicating "generally favorable reviews".

Reviews of the series seem positive in general. Variety called the show “breezy” with an intriguing premise while also pointing out that, like many time travel stories, the narrative doesn't necessarily stand up to scrutiny. Rolling Stone praised the relationship between Becca and Lolly while noting the show's use of ‘90s pop culture archetypes to invoke nostalgia. Vulture called the show’s vision "perfect," while The New York Times called the show "clever, affecting and sly" and a "credible period dramedy, somewhere between Beverly Hills, 90210 and Friends, and an armchair rumination on destiny and will."

== Music ==
Music, particularly music from the 1990s, is used heavily in the series and as a significant part of the network's promotion of the show. Creator Emily Fox said she didn't want the big number one songs but wanted "the one that sort of reaches into the back of your consciousness, that flicks this switch that hasn't been flicked in 15 years." Fox praised music supervisor Jon Ernst for his song selections and his ability to get the necessary licensing at reasonable cost. The show was able to license most of the music using three-year deals. Music used during the series includes:

Episode	Artist(s)	Song	Notes
Pilot (1.01)	U2	"Numb"	Played during Becca's elevator ride back to 1995
Pilot (1.01)	Ace of Base	"The Sign"	Played on alarm radio when Becca awakens in 1995
Pilot (1.01)	Alanis Morissette	"Hand In My Pocket"	Played in bar as Becca meets Xavier
Pilot (1.01)	The Cranberries	"Linger"	Played as Becca breaks off her engagement to Sean
Pilot (1.01)	Spin Doctors	"Two Princes"	Played in bar in final scene
Pilot (1.01)	Deee-Lite	"Groove Is in the Heart"	Played during the premiere's final scene
Square One (1.02)	Spacehog	"In the Meantime (Re-recorded version)"	Played while Becca and Xavier run into each other; Lolly and Jamie talking about their relationship
Square One (1.02)	Lisa Loeb	"Stay (I Missed You)"	Played as Sean confronts Becca about her breaking off their engagement
Square One (1.02)	Gin Blossoms	"Found Out About You"	Played while Lolly sneaks into Jamie's room
Square One (1.02)	Soul Asylum	"Misery"	Played while Sean talks to Becca on the street and invites her to go on the honeymoon with him
Square One (1.02)	Collective Soul	"Shine"	Played while Sean waits for Becca at the airport and Andy kisses Becca
Square One (1.02)	Green Day	"When I Come Around"	Played while Becca and Lolly talk about the date with Anton
Square One (1.02)	Social Distortion	"Ball and Chain"	Played while Becca and Lolly look at movies in the video store
Square One (1.02)	Huey Lewis and the News	"The Power of Love"	Played while Becca and Lolly watch Back to the Future and talk about flying cars
Square One (1.02)	Trio	"Da Da Da"	Played while Becca explains the iPhone and future technology to Lolly
Square One (1.02)	Us3	"Cantaloop (Flip Fantasia)"	Played while Becca gets ready for the first day of her new life
Square One (1.02)	Mariah Carey	"Fantasy"	Played while Becca goes to work
Square One (1.02)	Drivin N Cryin	"Fly Me Courageous"	Played while Becca and Lolly talk in the video store
Square One (1.02)	Red Hot Chili Peppers	"Breaking the Girl"	Played while Lolly goes to Sean's apartment to pick up Becca's stuff
Square One (1.02)	Juliana Hatfield	"My Sister"	Played while Becca gets dressed to go meet Anton
Square One (1.02)	The Soup Dragons	"I'm Free"	Played while Becca leaves Simon's apartment after quitting her job
Square One (1.02)	Toad the Wet Sprocket	"Walk on the Ocean"	Played while Lolly and Jamie are in bed
I Never... (1.03)	Matthew Sweet	"Sick of Myself"	Played while Lolly & Becca talk in the video store
I Never... (1.03)	The Soup Dragons	"Divine Thing"	Played when Phoebe gives her bridesmaid dress back to Becca
I Never... (1.03)	Sheryl Crow	"All I Wanna Do"	Played as Becca and her friends arrive at the bar for Lois's birthday party
I Never... (1.03)	Jane's Addiction	"Been Caught Stealing"	Played when the gang starts doing shots for Lois' birthday
I Never... (1.03)	Better Than Ezra	"Good"	Played when the gang starts playing Never Have I Ever during Lois' birthday
I Never... (1.03)	Stone Temple Pilots	"Plush"	Played at the end of Lois' birthday
I Never... (1.03)	Green Day	"Longview"	Played as Becca and Lolly discuss one night stands
I Never... (1.03)	Spin Doctors	"Little Miss Can't Be Wrong"	Played as Becca and Lolly decide that Becca should pursue a one-night stand
I Never... (1.03)	Montell Jordan	"This Is How We Do It"	Played as Becca, Lolly and Phoebe enter the club
I Never... (1.03)	Marky Mark and the Funky Bunch	"Good Vibrations"	Played during a montage of men trying to pick up Becca at the bar
I Never... (1.03)	Bell Biv DeVoe	"Poison"	Played as Becca and Lolly argue about Becca's refusal to explain why their friendship ends in the future
I Never... (1.03)	Collective Soul	"December"	Played during a montage of Becca and her friends and family going on with their lives in 1995.
A Very Important Date (1.04)	James	"Laid"	Played as Lolly hooks up with Jamie
A Very Important Date (1.04)	Hootie & the Blowfish	"Time"	Played while Becca receives multiple job offers
A Very Important Date (1.04)	The B-52's	"Roam"	Played as Lolly and Becca plan for the big Halloween party
A Very Important Date (1.04)	Dishwalla	"Counting Blue Cars"	Played in the bar as Becca, Lolly and Paige talk
A Very Important Date (1.04)	Violent Femmes	"Blister in the Sun"	Played during a montage of Jamie and Lolly trying on Halloween costumes
A Very Important Date (1.04)	Chuck Berry	"You Never Can Tell"	Played as Lolly & Jaime try on costumes as Mia Wallace & Vincent Vega from Pulp Fiction
A Very Important Date (1.04)	Bryan Adams	"Have You Ever Really Loved a Woman?"	Played as Andy and Melanie try on their Halloween costumes
A Very Important Date (1.04)	Veruca Salt	"Seether"	Played as Becca tells Melanie how to fix Simon's plumbing
A Very Important Date (1.04)	Soho	"Hippychick"	Played as Becca puts on her Alice costume
A Very Important Date (1.04)	Cypress Hill	"Insane in the Brain"	Played as Jaime plays video games and gets stoned with his friends
A Very Important Date (1.04)	The Proclaimers	"I'm Gonna Be (500 Miles)"	Played as Lolly worries about why Jamie is late for the Halloween party
A Very Important Date (1.04)	Poison	"Nothin' but a Good Time"	Played as Becca sees Sean kissing Paige at the Halloween party
A Very Important Date (1.04)	INXS	"Devil Inside"	Played while Becca talks to Sean at the bar
A Very Important Date (1.04)	Mazzy Star	"Fade Into You"	Played as Becca tends to Andy's fat lip
A Very Important Date (1.04)	Collective Soul	"The World I Know"	Played while Lolly and Becca talk on the roof after the Halloween party
A Very Important Date (1.04)	The La's	"There She Goes"	Played at the end of the episode as Becca takes a new job at a magazine.
...Then I'll Know (1.05)	Toadies	"Possum Kingdom"	Played as Becca pitches her idea to do a story on R.E.M to her bosses at the magazine
...Then I'll Know (1.05)	Deep Blue Something	"Breakfast at Tiffany's"	Played as Becca and Lolly make plans to go to the concert; as Lolly and Jamie run into each other at Becca's parents' house
...Then I'll Know (1.05)	R.E.M.	"Shiny Happy People"	Played as Becca, Lolly, and Paige head out on their road trip to the concert
...Then I'll Know (1.05)	Alanis Morissette	"You Oughta Know"	Played as Becca and Paige bond
...Then I'll Know (1.05)	R.E.M.	"What's the Frequency, Kenneth?"	Played outside the concert as Becca interviews a couple for her story then starts thinking about the kiss she shared with Andy
...Then I'll Know (1.05)	Del Amitri	"Roll to Me"	Played as Paige helps Becca come to terms with her feelings for Andy
...Then I'll Know (1.05)	Tom Cochrane	"Life Is a Highway"	Played as Becca arrives at the beach house she and Andy used to visit as children
...Then I'll Know (1.05)	R.E.M.	"Nightswimming"	Played as Becca waits for Andy to arrive at the beach house
Tragic Kingdom (1.06)	The Cure	"Lovesong"	Played as Lolly contemplates calling Kevin
Tragic Kingdom (1.06)	Sarah McLachlan	"Fear"	Played as Becca prays for Andy
Tragic Kingdom (1.06)	Bush	"Glycerine"	Played as Becca tells Lolly what her life with Andy was like in the present day
Tragic Kingdom (1.06)	Gin Blossoms	"Hey Jealousy"	Played as Becca tries to figure out whether Andy was on his way to see her or to see Melanie when he had his accident
Tragic Kingdom (1.06)	Live	"I Alone"	Played as Paige visits Sean and sees his drawings of Becca
Tragic Kingdom (1.06)	Tori Amos	"Precious Things"	Played as Becca tells Andy he is better off with Melanie
Tragic Kingdom (1.06)	KWS	"Please Don't Go"	Played by Jamie as he tries to win Lolly back by recreating the boombox scene from Say Anything...
Tragic Kingdom (1.06)	Natalie Merchant	"Carnival"	Played during the episode's end montage scene
The Cranberries (1.07)	Red Hot Chili Peppers	"Suck My Kiss"	Played as Becca and Sean have sex in his apartment
The Cranberries (1.07)	U2	"All I Want Is You"	Played as Sean tends to Becca's burned hand in the bathroom
The Cranberries (1.07)	Green Day	"Geek Stink Breath"	Played as Jamie and Stanton do drugs and plan their trip to the Dominican Republic
The Cranberries (1.07)	Jeff Buckley	"Last Goodbye"	Played as Becca and Lolly discuss everything that happened during Thanksgiving dinner; played during the episode's end montage scene
The Imaginary Line (1.8)	Vanessa Carlton	"A Thousand Miles"	Played as Lolly talks about how much she likes Kevin while she and Becca wait for him to arrive at the diner in 2003
The Imaginary Line (1.8)	Sheryl Crow	"Leaving Las Vegas"	Played as Lolly asks how her relationship with Kevin ends up in the future
The Imaginary Line (1.8)	Annie Lennox	"Why"	Played as Becca and Lolly meet Kevin in the diner in 1995
The Imaginary Line (1.8)	The Flaming Lips	"She Don't Use Jelly"	Played as Becca explains viral marketing to her bosses
The Imaginary Line (1.8)	Digable Planets	"The May 4th Movement"	Played as Sean asked Paige out to an Oasis concert
The Imaginary Line (1.8)	Digable Planets	"Rebirth of Slick"	Played as Paige offers Sean the opportunity to work with her at an art show
The Imaginary Line (1.8)	Five for Fighting	"Superman (It's Not Easy)"	Played as Becca and Kevin see each other in New York in 2003
The Imaginary Line (1.8)	L7	"Pretend We're Dead"	Played as Becca and Lolly make plans to attend a rave
The Imaginary Line (1.8)	Elastica	"Car Song"	Played as Becca, Lolly, and Paige talk at the bar where Paige works
The Imaginary Line (1.8)	Weezer	"Say It Ain't So"	Played as Paige talks to Becca about Sean
The Imaginary Line (1.8)	Green Day	"Basket Case"	Played as Becca, Lolly, and Kevin place stickers for Becca's magazine around New York
The Imaginary Line (1.8)	Coldplay	"Clocks"	Played as Becca and Kevin kiss for the first time in 2003
The Imaginary Line (1.8)	Norah Jones	"Come Away with Me	Played as Becca and Kevin lie in bed together after having sex in 2003
The Imaginary Line (1.8)	Sarah McLachlan	"Possession"	Played as Becca tells Lolly she's been sleeping with Kevin
All I Want for Christmas is You (1.09)	Toad The Wet Sprocket	"Little Heaven"	Played during the episode's opening scene as Becca and Kevin talk in the kitchen
All I Want for Christmas is You (1.09)	Green Day	"Stuck with Me"	Played as Lolly and Kevin discuss their plans for the day
All I Want for Christmas is You (1.09)	Mumbleskinny	"Fall Down"	Played as Noelle tries to convince Sean that he should make his art more commercial
All I Want for Christmas is You (1.09)	Frente	"Labour of Love"	Played as Becca helps Lolly get ready for her dinner with Kevin; as they re-enact the makeup scene from the movie The Breakfast Club
All I Want for Christmas is You (1.09)	Letters to Cleo	"Here and Now"	Played as Kevin and Lolly have dinner together
All I Want for Christmas is You (1.09)	Annie Lennox	"No More I Love You's"	Played as Lolly tells Kevin how she feels about him and he rejects her
All I Want for Christmas is You (1.09)	Morrissey	"The More You Ignore Me, the Closer I Get"	Played as Lolly ruins the plot of My Girl for customers at the video store
All I Want for Christmas is You (1.09)	Sub Rosa	"White Flag"	Played as Becca tries to comfort Lolly over Kevin not returning her feelings
All I Want for Christmas is You (1.09)	Meat Puppets	"Backwater"	Played as Becca learns how successful her viral marketing campaign for the magazine has been
All I Want for Christmas is You (1.09)	Run-D.M.C.	"Christmas in Hollis"	Played as Becca greets guests at her Christmas party
All I Want for Christmas is You (1.09)	Blues Traveller	"Run-Around"	Played as Becca realizes Lolly has invited Kevin to the party
All I Want for Christmas is You (1.09)	Freedy Johnston	"Bad Reputation"	Played as Kevin and Becca talk at the party; as Lolly and Jamie see each other at the party
All I Want for Christmas is You (1.09)	Ini Kamoze	"Here Comes The Hotstepper"	Played as Becca's bosses arrive at the party
All I Want for Christmas is You (1.09)	Haddaway	"What Is Love"	Played as Sebastian mistakes a VHS tape of a colonoscopy for a movie
All I Want for Christmas is You (1.09)	Skee-Lo	"I Wish"	Played as Paige begins to suspect that Becca and Kevin may have feelings for each other
All I Want for Christmas is You (1.09)	Dusty Springfield	"Son of a Preacher Man"	Played as Becca sees Sean at the party
All I Want for Christmas is You (1.09)	Cracker	"Low"	Played as Lolly and Kevin talk at the party
All I Want for Christmas is You (1.09)	UB40	"Can't Help Falling In Love"	Played as Lolly tries to get Kevin to kiss her under the mistletoe
All I Want for Christmas is You (1.09)	Soul Asylum	"Runaway Train"	Played as Jamie and Lolly kiss
All I Want for Christmas is You (1.09)	The Cure	"Pictures of You"	Played as Lolly finds the money Jamie has been making from selling drugs
All I Want for Christmas is You (1.09)	Ammonia	"Drugs"	Played as Jamie and Stanton discuss their drug business
All I Want for Christmas is You (1.09)	Live	"Lightning Crashes"	Played at the end of the episode at Kevin kisses Becca in 1995
Auld Lang Syne (1.10)	Andy Williams	"It's the Most Wonderful Time of the Year"	Played as Becca repeatedly leaves Lolly phone messages after Lolly caught her and Kevin kissing
Auld Lang Syne (1.10)	Stone Temple Pilots	"Big Empty"	Played as Sean and Noelle discuss his art at his apartment
Auld Lang Syne (1.10)	Dog and Pony Show	"What Else"	Played as Sean and Paige talk on the phone
Auld Lang Syne (1.10)	Blues Traveller	"Hook"	Played as Becca runs into Kevin
Auld Lang Syne (1.10)	Cowboy Junkies	"Sweet Jane"	Played as Becca tries to break things off with Kevin
Auld Lang Syne (1.10)	White Zombie	"More Human than Human"	Played as Becca and Lolly discuss Kevin
Auld Lang Syne (1.10)	The Black Crowes	"She Talks to Angels"	Played as Paige finds out she got a part in a movie
Auld Lang Syne (1.10)	Lab Partners	"Starlight"	Played as Lolly questions Jamie about the trouble he is in
Auld Lang Syne (1.10)	Enigma	"Return to Innocence"	Played as Sean finds out his paintings have sold
Auld Lang Syne (1.10)	Sheryl Crow	"I Shall Believe"	Played as Kevin and Becca kiss and consider pursuing a relationship
Auld Lang Syne (1.10)	Toad the Wet Sprocket	"Crowing"	Played as Paige tells Sean she is moving to Los Angeles
Auld Lang Syne (1.10)	Ace of Base	"Beautiful Life"	Played as Becca and Lolly arrive at the New Year's Eve party
Auld Lang Syne (1.10)	Dexy's Midnight Runners	"Come On Eileen"	Played as Jamie and Lolly begin to come to terms with their feelings for each other
Auld Lang Syne (1.10)	R.E.M.	"It's the End of the World as We Know It (And I Feel Fine)"	Played as Lolly figures out the real reason her friendship with Becca ends in the future
Auld Lang Syne (1.10)	U2	"Numb"	Played as Becca tries desperately to recreate the elevator ride that brought her to 1995 in hopes of escaping the results of her trip back in time

== International broadcast ==
In Southeast Asia, the series was broadcast on cable and satellite channel Star World beginning in August 2016.

In Germany, the series was broadcast on the Disney Channel beginning March 30, 2017.
