= Sean Dickson (disambiguation) =

Sean Dickson may refer to:

- Sean Dickson (born 1991), South African cricketer
- Sean Dickson (born 1967), Scottish vocalist of the Soup Dragons and The High Fidelity
- Sean Dickson (footballer) (born 1992), Scottish professional footballer for Stirling Albion F.C.

== See also ==
- Sean Dixon (disambiguation)
