= Mother Universe =

Single by The Soup Dragons

from the album Lovegod
- Released: 1990
- Genre: Alternative rock, dub
- Length: various
- Label: Big Life
- Songwriter: Sean Dickson

The Soup Dragons singles chronology
"Crotch Deep Trash" (1989)	"Mother Universe" (1990)	"I'm Free" (1990)

"Mother Universe" is a single taken from the Soup Dragons album Lovegod. The original version, "hinging on a Marc Bolan riff", was initially ignored and regarded according to Rage Magazine as 'weird'. However, after the considerable success of the album's second single, "I'm Free", Mother Universe was reworked to give it a similar feel, substituting a gospel-style chorus for guitar chords and adding various whoops and small elements of toasting. The new version reached 26 in the UK Charts and was later re-issued in the US backed by "Sweetmeat". Despite the latter version's greater success, lead singer Sean Dickson has stated his preference for the original version.

== Cover art ==
The original version featured a bowed headed Madonna figure in colour reversed reds. The remix version cover art featured a stylised blue fly with orange wings.

== Track listing ==
=== UK downtempo promo 7-inch; 1989 ===
- Mother Universe 7:28
- Mother Universe (Mother Dub) 6:23

=== UK, October 1990 Remix ===
- Mother Universe (7" Version) 3:50
- Dream-E-4-Ever (Live) 4:05
- Mother Universe (12" Version) 7:29

=== UK, October 1990 CD ===
- Mother Universe (Love Dub)
- 4-Way Brain
- Mother Universe (Solar Dub)

=== US Release ===
- Mother Universe (12" Version)
- Mother Universe
- Sweetmeat
- Softly

=== Canadian Release ===
- Mother Universe (12") 7:30
- Dream Forever (Live) 5:35
- Sweetmeat (12") 6:14
- Softly (Live) 4:16
- Backwards Dog (12") 6:07
- 4-Way Brain 2:33

== Charts ==
Chart (1990)	Peak position
Europe (Eurochart Hot 100)	76
New Zealand (RIANZ)	45
UK Singles (OCC)	26
