= Hydrophonic (Soup Dragons album) =

Studio album by the Soup Dragons
- Released: April 1994
- Studio: Homegrown and CaVa, Glasgow
- Genre: Alternative rock
- Length: 63:21
- Label: Polygram
- Producer: Sean Dickson

The Soup Dragons chronology
Hotwired (1992)	Hydrophonic (1994)

Professional ratings
Review scores
Source	Rating
AllMusic	3/5 stars

Hydrophonic is the fourth and final studio album from Scottish band the Soup Dragons. By this stage, lead singer Sean Dickson was the only original member of the band, working with a variety of session musicians including Bootsy Collins, Lynval Golding, Neville Staples, Tina Weymouth, the Kick Horns and the Scottish Chamber Orchestra.

It was released in 1994 to weak sales and generally apathetic or poor reviews. Jason Damas's AllMusic review has since claimed that this was an injustice and that "if you liked the more rocking parts of Hotwired, and want to hear more, this is an extremely worthwhile place to go." Trouser Press was contrastingly dismissive, called the album a "soggy hodgepodge of lunkheaded rock, would-be hip-hop, blues, soulful backing vocals and chants" and advised readers to "flush it".

Following the disappointing sales of the album, Dickson ended the Soup Dragons and went on to form the High Fidelity.

== Track listing ==
All songs written by Sean Dickson.

1. "One Way Street" (4:00)
2. "Don't Get Down (Get Down)" (5:05)
3. "Do You Care?" (3:20)
4. "May the Force Be with You" (4:31)
5. "Contact High" (3:43)
6. "All Messed Up" (3:39)
7. "The Time Is Now" (4:52)
8. "Freeway" (4:19)
9. "Rest in Peace" (5:42)
10. "JF Junkie" (4:34)
11. "Automatic Speed Queen" (3:23)
12. "Out of Here" (3:37)
13. "Motherfunker" (6:52)
14. "Black and Blues" (4:47)
15. "Hypersonic" (0:54)
