= Resident Alien (album) =

Studio album by Spacehog
- Released: 24 October 1995
- Studios: Bearsville (Bearsville, New York)
- Genres: Power pop; alternative rock; glam rock; Britpop
- Length: 69:22
- Labels: Sire, Elektra
- Producers: Bryce Goggin, Spacehog

Spacehog chronology
Resident Alien (1995)	The Chinese Album (1998)

Singles from Resident Alien
- 1. "Space Is the Place" Released: 1995; 2. "In the Meantime" Released: 20 February 1996; 3. "To Be a Millionaire... Was It Likely? (Live)" Released: 1996; 4. "Candyman" Released: 1996; 5. "Cruel to Be Kind" Released: July 22, 1996

Resident Alien is the debut studio album by the English rock band Spacehog. Released by Sire Records and Elektra Records on 24 October 1995, the album was certified gold on 29 July 1996 and included the hit single "In the Meantime", which reached the top of the Mainstream Rock Tracks chart in the US, and remained there for four weeks. Most of Resident Alien's basic tracks were recorded live in a barn in Woodstock, New York. It was intended to give the album the immediacy of live room recording.

Although Jonny Cragg makes his singing debut in "Skylark" on the band's second LP, The Chinese Album, it is his voice that introduces "Space Is the Place" on Resident Alien. The spoken line in the middle of "Never Coming Down (Part II)", "Everybody in the world is bent", comes from the 1969 movie The Italian Job. The movie also features jail inmates clapping out the rhythm used in this song. In a tribute to the film Candyman, the chorus to "Candyman" repeats the titular name four times (also referencing the Sammy Davis Jr. standard, originally appearing in the 1971 film Willy Wonka & the Chocolate Factory).

"Only a Few" and "In the Meantime" were used in the 1996 film Libor Karas World Tour, The Bouncing Czech. "In the Meantime" was also used as the theme song for David Spade's 1998 one-hour HBO stand-up comedy special David Spade: Take the Hit; was used in the film Fanboys; is a playable song in the video game Guitar Hero 5 as a re-recording, as the original recording featured in Rock Band 3; served as the theme song for the TV show Hindsight; and was featured in the film Guardians of the Galaxy Vol. 3. "Never Coming Down (Part II)" was featured in the 1996 movie D3: The Mighty Ducks.

== Critical reception ==
Professional ratings
Review scores
Source	Rating
AllMusic	4/5 stars
Pitchfork	7.6/10 (1999); 7.5/10 (2021)

The Gazette wrote: "While the band sets the crunch of 'Cruel to Be Kind' (not Nick Lowe) against the bubble of 'The Last Dictator', singer Royston Langdon does Bowie as Bay City Roller."

== Track listing ==
All tracks are written by Royston Langdon, except where noted.

No.	Title	Writer(s)	Length
1.	"In the Meantime"		4:58
2.	"Spacehog"	Antony Langdon	2:13
3.	"Starside"		3:49
4.	"Candyman"		5:23
5.	"Space Is the Place"	A. Langdon	3:06
6.	"Never Coming Down (Part I)"		1:44
7.	"Cruel to Be Kind"		3:05
8.	"Ship Wrecked"		5:28
9.	"Only a Few"		3:23
10.	"The Last Dictator"		4:14
11.	"Never Coming Down (Part II)"		4:02
12.	"Zeroes"	Gareth Hodgson, R. Langdon	6:38
13.	"To Be a Millionaire... Was It Likely?"		21:21

- The song "To Be a Millionaire... Was It Likely?" ends at 2:10. After 11 minutes of silence (2:10 – 13:10), begins "Untitled".

== Personnel ==
Credits adapted from the liner notes of Resident Alien.

Spacehog

- Royston Langdon – vocals, bass guitar, Moog synthesizer, Hammond organ, piano, Magnus chord organ
- Antony Langdon – guitar, Roland Juno-106 synthesizer, Moog synthesizer, Hammond organ, vocals
- Jonny Cragg – drums, percussion, backing vocals
- Richard Steel – lead guitar

Production

- Todd Toddney Vos – assistant engineer
- Carl Plaster – drum technician
- Bryce Goggin – mixing
- Sue Dryer – assistant mixing
- Dave Voight – assistant mixing
- Scott Hull – mastering (Masterdisk)

Imagery

- Mary Iggy Frey – Hog logo design

== Charts ==
Chart (1996–1997)	Peak position
Australian Albums (ARIA)	50
Canadian Albums (The Record)	19
UK Albums (Official Charts)	40
US Billboard 200	49

== Certifications ==
Region	Certification	Certified units/sales
Canada (Music Canada)	Platinum	100,000^{^}
United States (RIAA)	Gold	500,000^{^}
^{^} Shipments figures based on certification alone.
