= Liv Tyler =

American actress (born 1977)

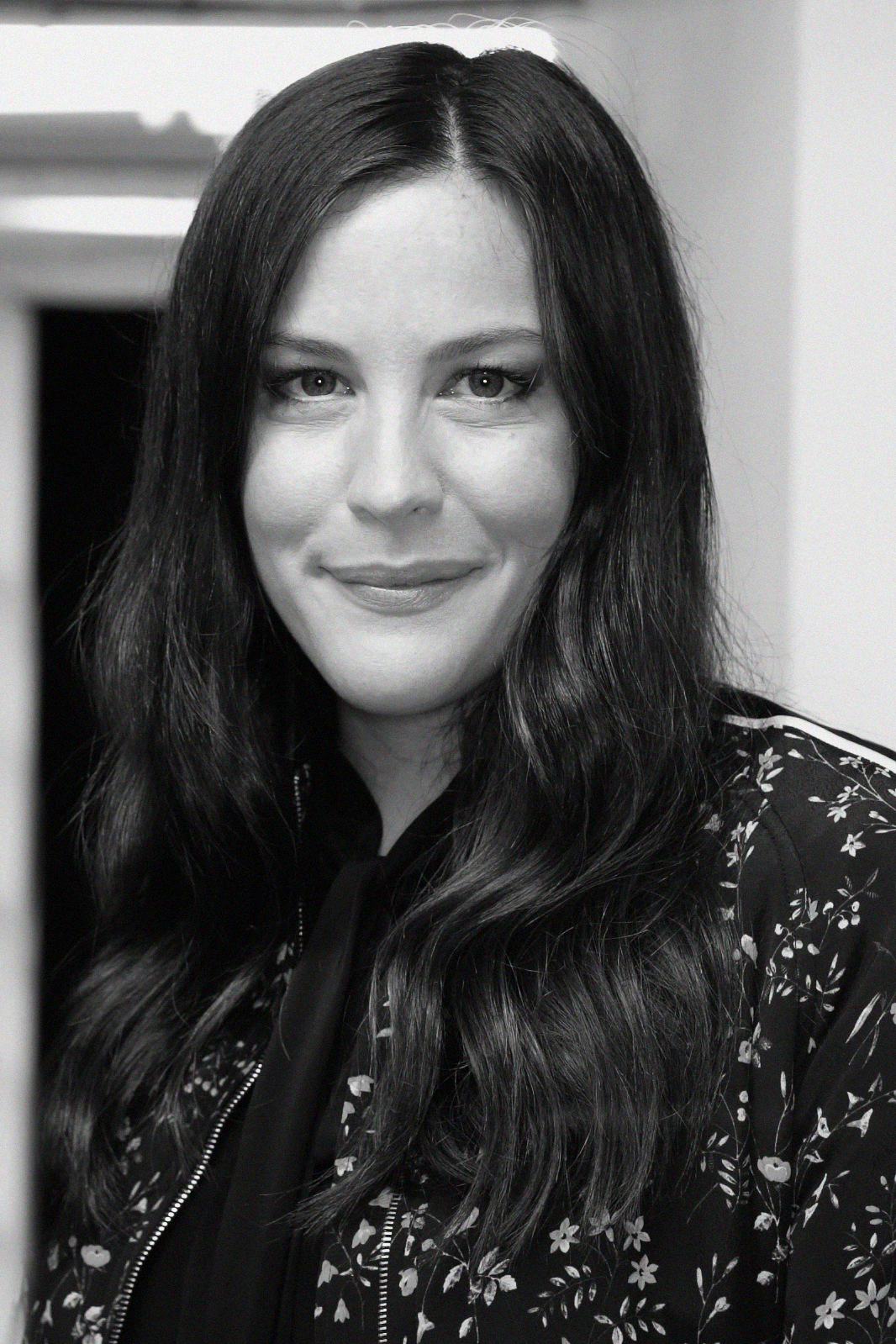
- Tyler in 2016
- Born: Liv Rundgren; July 1, 1977 (age 49); New York City, U.S.
- Occupations: Actress; model
- Years active: 1991–present
- Spouse: Royston Langdon (m. 2003; div. 2008)
- Partner: David Gardner (2014–2021)
- Children: 3
- Parents: Bebe Buell (mother); Steven Tyler (biological father); Todd Rundgren (adoptive/legal father)
- Relatives: Mia Tyler (paternal half-sister); Jon Foster (brother-in-law)

Liv Rundgren Tyler (born Liv Rundgren; July 1, 1977) is an American actress. She began her career as a model before making her film debut in Silent Fall (1994). She went on to receive critical recognition and attention after her starring roles in various films including Heavy (1995), Empire Records (1995), Stealing Beauty (1996), That Thing You Do! (1996), Inventing the Abbotts (1997), Armageddon (1998), Cookie's Fortune (1999) and One Night at McCool's (2001). She then appeared as Arwen Undómiel in the Lord of the Rings film trilogy (2001–2003), which became one of the highest-grossing film series of all time.

Tyler subsequently appeared in a variety of roles, including the films Jersey Girl (2004), Lonesome Jim (2005), Reign Over Me (2007), The Strangers (2008), Robot & Frank (2012), Space Station 76 (2014), Wildling (2018), and Ad Astra (2019). She has also starred as Betty Ross in the Marvel Cinematic Universe (MCU) films The Incredible Hulk (2008) and Captain America: Brave New World (2025). In television, she has starred in the HBO supernatural drama series The Leftovers (2014–2017), the BBC period drama Gunpowder (2017), Harlots (2018–2019) and the Fox series 9-1-1: Lone Star (2020).

Outside of film, Tyler has served as a UNICEF Goodwill Ambassador for the United States since 2003, and has been a spokesperson for Givenchy's line of perfume and cosmetics. She is also notable as the daughter of Steven Tyler and Bebe Buell, although she has a very close relationship with her adoptive father Todd Rundgren. Tyler has also performed with composer Howard Shore and covered various songs including "Hey, That's No Way to Say Goodbye" and "Need You Tonight".

== Early life ==
Tyler was born Liv Rundgren at Mount Sinai Hospital in New York City's East Harlem neighborhood on July 1, 1977. She is the only daughter of Bebe Buell, a model, singer, and former Playboy Playmate (Miss November 1974), and Steven Tyler, the lead singer of Aerosmith. Her mother named her after Norwegian actress Liv Ullmann, after seeing Ullmann on the cover of the March 5, 1977, issue of TV Guide. Her ancestry includes Italian (from her great-grandfather), Polish, German, English, Ukrainian, and African-American (from her paternal 4th great-grandfather). Tyler has three half-siblings: Mia Tyler (born 1978), Chelsea Anna Tyler Foster (née Tallarico; born 1989), and Taj Monroe Tallarico (born 1991). Her maternal grandmother, Dorothea Johnson, founded the Protocol School of Washington.

From 1972 to 1979, Buell lived with rock musician Todd Rundgren. In 1976, Buell became pregnant from a brief relationship with Steven Tyler. She gave birth on July 1, 1977, naming her daughter Liv Rundgren. Liv told People Magazine in 1992 that Rundgren was her "spiritual father". At the time of Liv's birth, Rundgren and Buell had ended their romantic relationship. Nevertheless, Rundgren signed Liv's birth certificate and acted as a father figure to her, including paying for her education. She maintains a close relationship with him. "I'm so grateful to him, I have so much love for him," she told Wonderland Magazine in 2009. "When he holds me it feels like Daddy. And he's very protective and strong."

At age 10 or 11, Liv met Steven Tyler. She suspected that he was her father when she observed the resemblance between him and herself. When she asked her mother about her paternity, the secret was revealed. The truth about Tyler's paternity did not become public until 1991, when Liv changed her surname from Rundgren to Tyler; she kept Rundgren as a middle name. Buell's stated reason for having claimed that Rundgren was Liv's father was that Tyler was heavily addicted to drugs at the time of Liv's birth. Liv has developed a close relationship with Steven. They have worked together professionally, once when Liv appeared in Aerosmith's music video for "Crazy" in 1993, and again when Aerosmith performed songs for the film Armageddon (1998), in which Liv starred.

Tyler attended the Congressional School of Virginia, Breakwater School, and Waynflete School in Portland, Maine, before returning to New York City with her mother at age 12. She went to York Preparatory in New York City for junior high and high school after her mother researched the school to accommodate Tyler's ADHD. She also attended the Crossroads School for Arts & Sciences in Santa Monica, California. She graduated from York in 1995 and left to continue her acting career. When asked about her youth, Tyler said: "For me, I didn't get much of a childhood in my teen years because I've been working since I was 14. But that also kept me out of trouble. When everybody was doing acid and partying like crazy, I was at work on a movie in Tuscany ... having my own fun, of course, but it was a different kind of thing. I have no regrets. I love the way my life has gone."

== Career ==
=== 1991–1997: Early work ===
Tyler received her first modeling job at 14 with the assistance of Paulina Porizkova, who took pictures of her that ended up in Interview magazine. She later starred in television commercials. She became bored with her modeling career less than a year after it started and decided to go into acting, although she never took acting lessons. Tyler first became known to television audiences when she starred alongside Alicia Silverstone in the music video for Aerosmith's 1993 song "Crazy".

Tyler made her feature film debut in Silent Fall in 1994, where she played the elder sister of a boy with autism. In 1995, she starred in the comedy-drama Empire Records. Tyler has described Empire Records as "one of the best experiences" she has ever had. Soon after, she landed a supporting role in James Mangold's 1995 drama Heavy as Callie, a naive young waitress. The film received favorable reviews; critic Janet Maslin noted: "Ms. Tyler ... gives a charmingly ingenuous performance, betraying no self-consciousness about her lush good looks."

Tyler's breakthrough role was in the arthouse film Stealing Beauty (1996), in which she played Lucy Harmon, an innocent, romantic teenager who travels to Tuscany, Italy, intent on losing her virginity. The film received generally mixed reviews, but Tyler's performance was regarded favorably by critics. Variety wrote: "Tyler is the perfect accomplice. At times sweetly awkward, at others composed and serene, the actress appears to respond effortlessly and intuitively to the camera, creating a rich sense of what Lucy is about that often is not explicit in the dialogue." Empire noted, "Liv Tyler (here radiantly resembling a ganglier young Ava Gardner) with a rare opportunity to enamour, a break she capitalizes on with composure." The film was directed by Bernardo Bertolucci, who chose Tyler for the role after meeting with a number of young girls in Los Angeles, including Tyler's music video co-star Alicia Silverstone. Bertolucci said "there was something missing in all of them". He later said that what he saw in Tyler was a gravitas he described as "a New York aura". During promotion of the film, Tyler said she wanted to separate herself from the character during production: "I tried my damnedest not to think of my own situation. But at one point, after a take, I just started to cry and cry. I remembered when I found out about my dad and how we just stared at each other from head to toe taking in every nook and cranny."

She later appeared in That Thing You Do! (1996), a movie about a fictional one-hit wonder rock band called The Oneders (renamed The Wonders), following their whirlwind rise to the top of the pop charts and, just as quickly, their plunge back to obscurity. The film was written and directed by Tom Hanks. It grossed over $25 million worldwide, and received favorable reviews. In 1997, she appeared in Inventing the Abbotts as the daughter of Will Patton and Barbara Williams' characters. The movie is based on a short story by Sue Miller. Entertainment Weekly declared Tyler's performance as "lovely and pliant". That same year, Tyler was chosen by People magazine as one of the 50 Most Beautiful People.

=== 1998–2000: Mainstream exposure ===
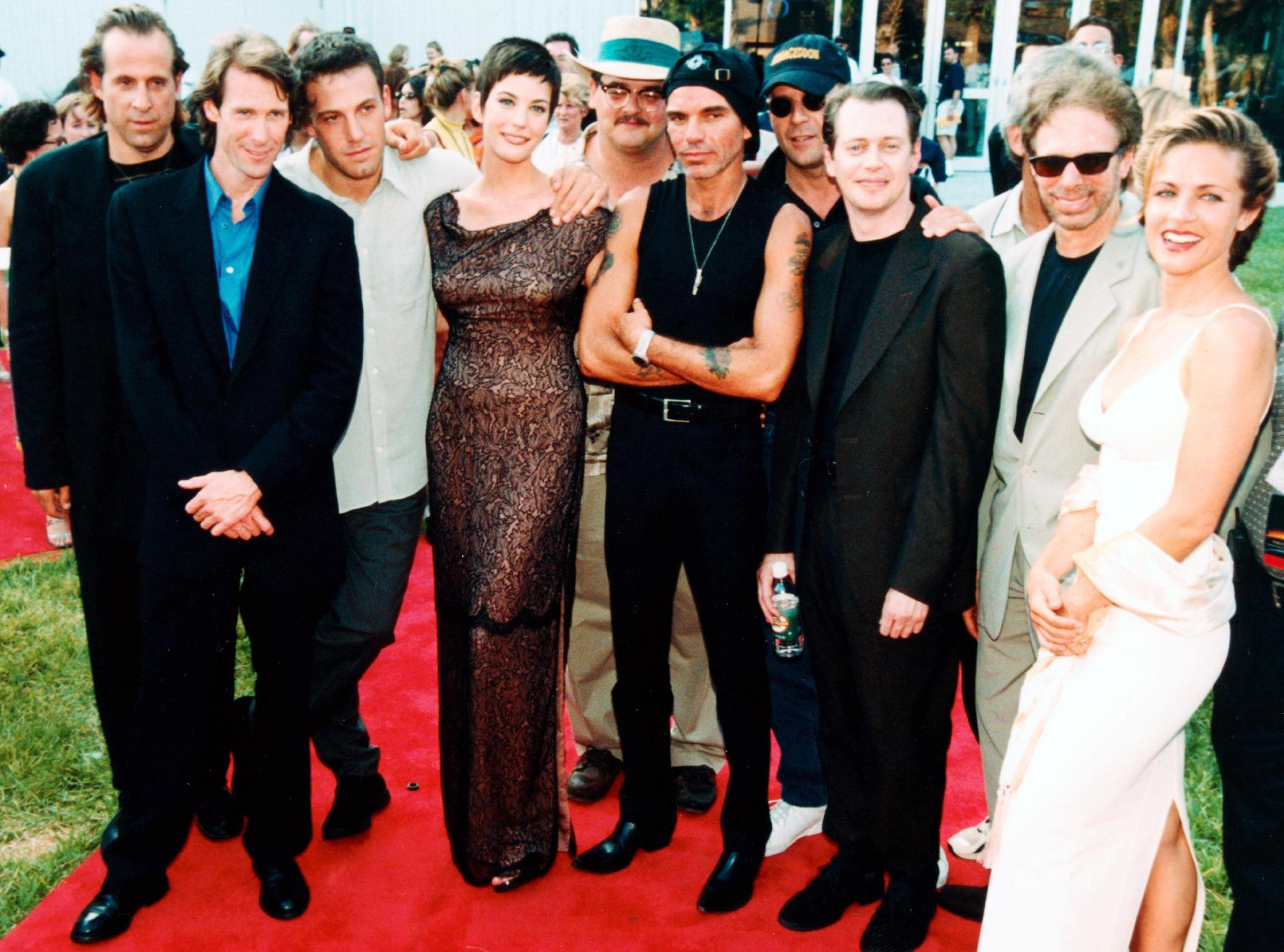
Tyler (center) with cast and crew at the premiere of Armageddon, at the Kennedy Space Center in Florida, 1998

Tyler next appeared in Armageddon (1998), where she played the daughter of Bruce Willis's character and love interest of Ben Affleck's character. The film generated mixed reviews, but it was a box office blockbuster, earning $553 million worldwide. The movie included the songs "I Don't Want to Miss a Thing" and "What Kind of Love Are You On" by Aerosmith. In a 2001 interview with The Guardian, she said that she initially turned down the role in Armageddon: "I really didn't want to do it at first and I turned it down a couple of times, but the biggest reason I changed my mind was because I was scared of it. I wanted to try it for that very reason. I mean, I'm not really in this to do amazing things in my career – I just want it to be special when I make a movie."

She was then cast in the drama Onegin (1999), a film based on the 19th century Russian novel of the same name by Alexander Pushkin, in which she portrayed Tatyana Larina and co-starred with Ralph Fiennes. Tyler was required to master an English accent, though Stephen Holden of The New York Times felt that her approximation of an English accent was "inert". The film was critically and financially unsuccessful. That same year, she appeared in the historical comedy film Plunkett & Macleane.

She later appeared in two films directed by Robert Altman, Cookie's Fortune (1999) and Dr. T & the Women (2000). In Cookie's Fortune, she was part of an ensemble cast that included Glenn Close, Richard Gere, Julianne Moore, Chris O'Donnell, and Patricia Neal. Her performance was well received among critics; Salon.com wrote: "This is the first time in which Tyler's acting is a match for her beauty (she's always been a bit forlorn). Altman helps her find some snap, but a relaxed, silly snap, as in the cartoon sound she makes when she takes a midday swig of bourbon. The lazy geniality of the movie is summed up by the way Emma [Tyler's character] saunters off to take a swim with her cowboy hat and pint of Wild Turkey." Entertainment Weekly also wrote that Tyler was "sweetly gruff as the tomboy troublemaker". In Dr. T & the Women, a romantic comedy, she played Marilyn, a gynecological patient of Richard Gere's character and the lesbian lover of his daughter, played by Kate Hudson.

=== Early 2000s ===
Tyler photographed in 2003

In 2001, Tyler played the object of infatuation for three men (Matt Dillon, John Goodman, and Paul Reiser) in the comedy One Night at McCool's. She said the role was "definitely the first part where I had to be so physically aware and have people so aware of me physically. Maybe it's not hard for anybody else, but it is a bit for me. I mean I love my body and I feel very comfortable in my skin but this was tough." Peter Travers of Rolling Stone wrote: "Tyler, a true beauty, gives the role a valiant try, but her range is too limited to play this amalgam of female perfection."

In 2001, she starred in the feature film The Lord of the Rings: The Fellowship of the Ring, directed by Peter Jackson. She played the Elf maiden Arwen Undómiel. The film is based on the first volume of J. R. R. Tolkien's The Lord of the Rings. The filmmakers approached Tyler after seeing her performance in Plunkett & Macleane. She learned to speak the Elvish language that was created by Tolkien. Mick LaSalle of the San Francisco Chronicle said Tyler's performance was "lovely and earnest".

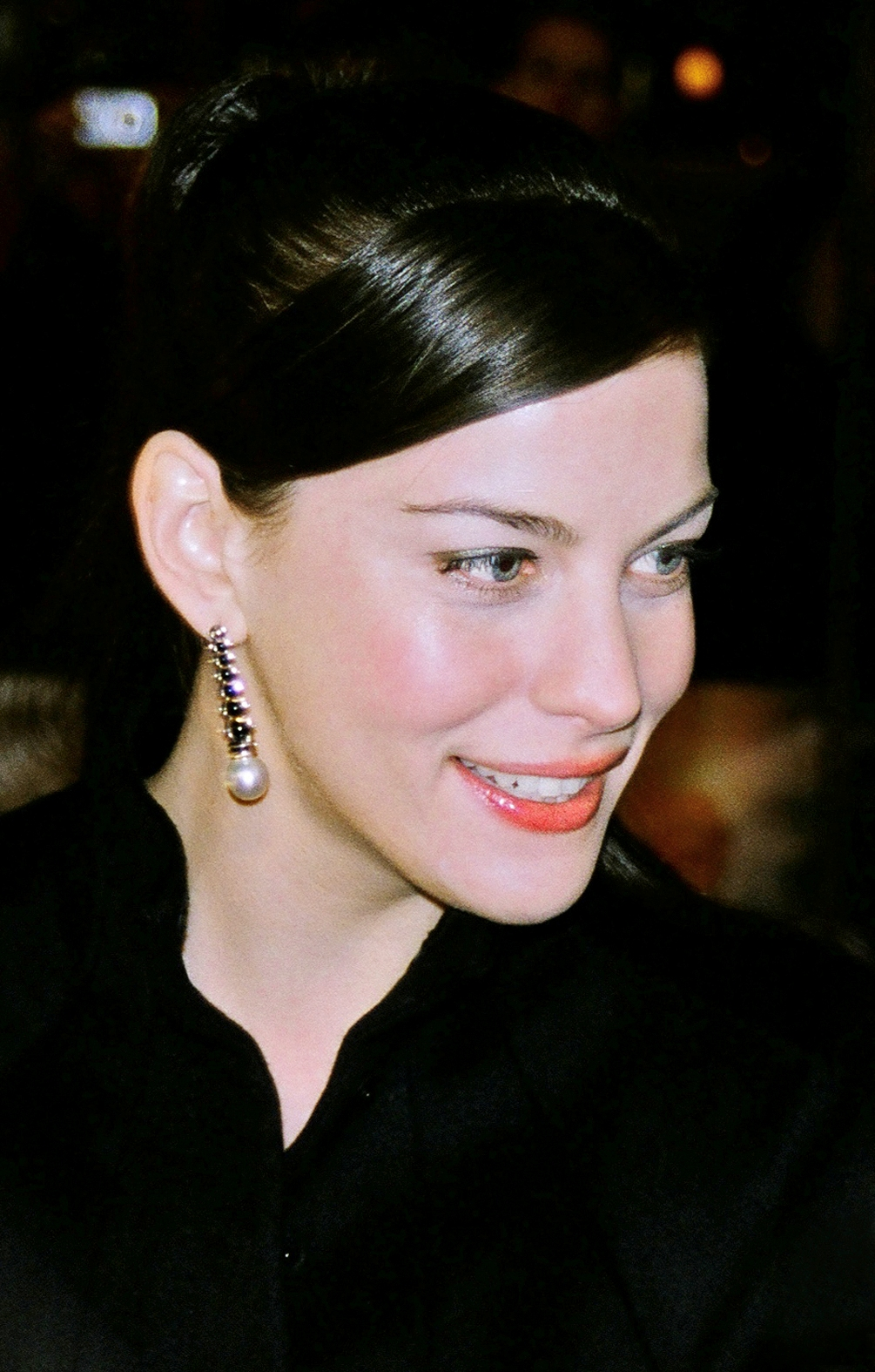
Tyler at the premiere of The Lord of the Rings: The Return of the King in 2003

A year later, Tyler again starred as Arwen in The Lord of the Rings: The Two Towers, the second installment of the series. The film received favorable reviews. She spent months learning sword fighting for the concluding battle scenes in the film, but her scenes were removed after the script was changed. The film was an enormous box office success, earning over $926 million worldwide and out-grossing its predecessor, which earned over $871 million. In 2003, Tyler featured in the third and last installment of the series, The Lord of the Rings: The Return of the King.

Following the success of The Lord of the Rings, she appeared opposite her Armageddon co-star Ben Affleck in writer-director Kevin Smith's romantic comedy Jersey Girl (2004), playing a woman who meets a widowed father, played by Affleck, and re-opens his heart to love. In an interview with MTV News, Tyler confessed that she felt "scared and vulnerable" while filming Jersey Girl, adding "I was so used to those other elements of the character [Arwen]. On The Lord of the Rings, a lot of things were done in post-production, whereas this was really just about me and Ben sitting there, just shooting off dialogue."

In 2003, she became the spokesperson for Givenchy perfume and cosmetics, and in 2005 the brand named a rose after her, which was used in one of its fragrances. In 2009, she signed on for two more years as Givenchy spokesperson. On December 8, 2011, Givenchy announced a collaboration between Givenchy perfumes and Sony Music. In the video released on February 7, 2012, Tyler covered the INXS song "Need You Tonight".

In 2005, she appeared in Steve Buscemi's independent drama Lonesome Jim, where she was cast alongside Casey Affleck as a single mother and nurse who reconnects with an old fling who has returned to their small Indiana town after a failed run as a novelist in New York. The film was screened at a special presentation at the 2005 Sundance Film Festival where it was nominated for the Grand Jury Prize. Her next appearance was in a supporting role as an insightful therapist who tries to help a once-successful dentist (Adam Sandler) cope with the loss of his family in the September 11 attacks in Reign Over Me (2007).

=== 2008–present: Box office hits and The Leftovers ===
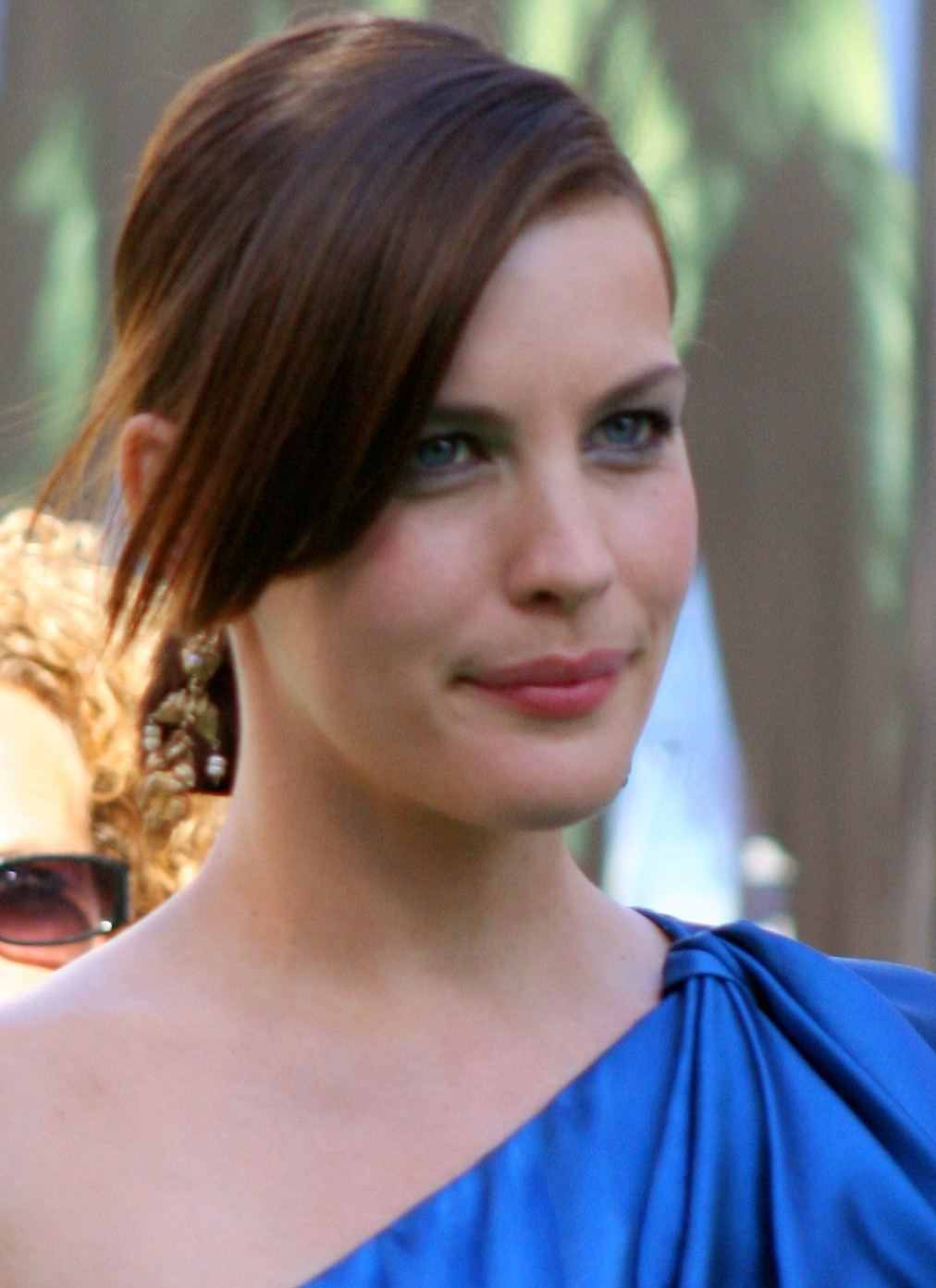
Tyler at the premiere for The Incredible Hulk in June 2008

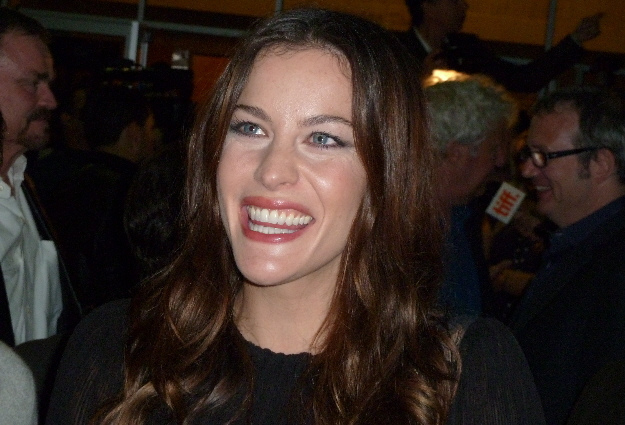
Tyler at the premiere of Super, 2010

In 2008, she starred in the home invasion horror film The Strangers with Scott Speedman, a film about a young couple who are terrorized one night by three masked assailants in their remote country house. Although the film garnered a mixed reception among critics, it was a major box office success, earning more than $80 million over its $9 million budget. In an interview with Entertainment Weekly, she said The Strangers was the most challenging role of her career. "It was as far as I could push myself in every way: physically, emotionally, mentally."

She appeared in The Incredible Hulk (2008), in which she played Dr. Betty Ross, the love interest of the title character, played by Edward Norton. Tyler was a fan of the television show, and was attracted to the love story in the script. She said filming the part was "very physical, which was fun", and compared her performance to "a deer caught in the headlights". The Incredible Hulk was a moderate box office success, earning over $262 million worldwide against a $150 million budget. The Washington Post, in review of the film, wrote: "Tyler gives Betty an appropriately angelic nimbus of ethereal gentleness as the one Beauty who can tame the Beast ... during their most pivotal encounters."

Tyler appeared in two films released in 2011: Super and The Ledge. In April 2011, publishing house Rodale announced that Tyler and her grandmother Dorothea Johnson, an etiquette expert, had written a book called Modern Manners. It was released October 29, 2013.

In 2014, Tyler appeared in Space Station 76, a film directed by Jack Plotnick, also starring Matt Bomer and Patrick Wilson, as well as in the independent horror-drama film Jamie Marks Is Dead, directed by Carter Smith. Tyler began appearing as a regular in the HBO television series The Leftovers in June 2014. The series ended in 2017 after three seasons.

In 2016, Tyler took on a role opposite Bel Powley in the fantasy/horror drama film Wildling, directed by Fritz Böhm. The film also marked her debut as a producer. It was released in 2018.

In 2017, Tyler landed a role as Anne Vaux in the BBC/HBO miniseries Gunpowder, co-starring Kit Harington. She later joined the second season of the ITV/Hulu period drama series Harlots, starring in the second and third series in a regular role as Lady Isabella Fitzwilliam.

In 2019, Tyler co-starred opposite Brad Pitt in the science fiction drama film Ad Astra, which received positive reviews from critics. In 2020, she began a starring role as Michelle Blake in the Fox procedural drama series 9-1-1: Lone Star, which is a spin-off of the drama series 9-1-1. On June 1, 2020, Tyler – together with her Lord of the Rings costars Sean Astin, Sean Bean, Orlando Bloom, Billy Boyd, Ian McKellen, Dominic Monaghan, Viggo Mortensen, Miranda Otto, John Rhys-Davies, Andy Serkis, Karl Urban, and Elijah Wood, plus writer Philippa Boyens and director Peter Jackson – joined Josh Gad's YouTube series Reunited Apart which reunites the cast of popular movies through video-conferencing, and promotes donations to non-profit charities.

In February 2025, she reprised her role as Betty Ross in Captain America: Brave New World (2025), 15 years after her first appearance in The Incredible Hulk.

== Personal life ==
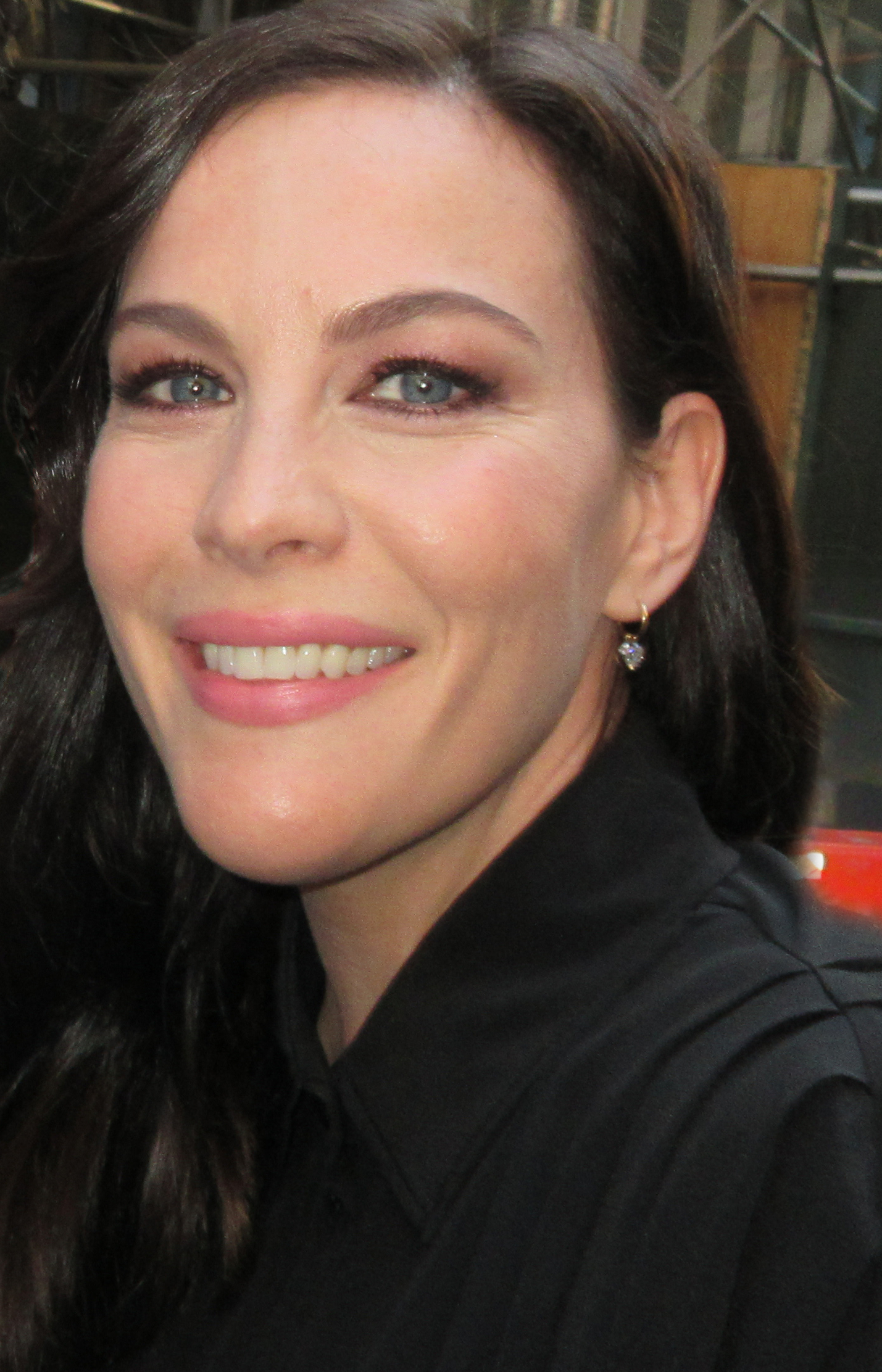
Tyler in 2018

Tyler dated her Inventing the Abbotts co-star Joaquin Phoenix from 1995 to 1998. During her relationship with Phoenix, she became a vegan; however, when the relationship ended, she went back to eating meat. In 1998, she began dating British musician Royston Langdon of the band Spacehog. They became engaged in February 2001, and married in Barbados on March 25, 2003. In December 2004, she gave birth to a son. On May 8, 2008, they confirmed through representatives that they would be separating.

In June 2010, Tyler stated she was "far too sensitive" for casual dates, adding "I fall in love once in a blue moon."

In 2014, Tyler met David Gardner, a British sports and entertainment manager. They became engaged in July 2015, but the couple ended their engagement in March 2021. They have two children together: a son born in February 2015, and a daughter born in July 2016. Tyler temporarily moved to London shortly after her daughter's birth.

Tyler learned transcendental meditation in New York City. In December 2012, she participated in a charity gala for the David Lynch Foundation to provide transcendental meditation to disadvantaged sections of society. At the event, she said, "It helps me make better decisions and be a better mother, and just deal with the daily stress of the modern world that we live in. It helps with everything."

Tyler bought a townhouse on West 11th Street in Greenwich Village, New York City, for $2.53 million in 2001. In 2019 she sold it for $17.45 million in favor of London, where she has resided with her family since 2018. She also owns a house in Malibu, California.

== Activism ==
Tyler is an active supporter of the charitable United Nations Children's Fund (UNICEF). She was appointed as a Goodwill Ambassador for the United States in 2003. In November 2004, she hosted the lighting of the UNICEF Snowflake in New York City. She was also a spokesperson for the 2004 Givenchy Mother's Day promotion in support of UNICEF's Maternal and Neonatal Tetanus campaign.

Since 2004, she has donated to the Women's Cancer Research Fund to support innovative research, education, and outreach directed at the development of more effective approaches to the early diagnosis, treatment, and prevention of all women's cancers. In October 2007, Tyler, with her mother Bebe Buell and her grandmother Dorothea Johnson, helped launch the Emergen-C Pink energy drink, in an event in honor of Breast Cancer Awareness month.

== Accolades ==
| Year | Award | Category | Work | Result | Ref. |
|---|---|---|---|---|---|
| 1996 | YoungStar Award | Best Actress – Drama | Stealing Beauty | Nominated | |
| 1998 | MTV Movie Award | Best Female Performance | Armageddon | Nominated | |
| 1998 | MTV Movie Award | Best On-Screen Duo (shared with Ben Affleck) | Armageddon | Nominated | |
| 1998 | Blockbuster Entertainment Award | Favorite Science Fiction Actress | Armageddon | Nominated | |
| 1999 | Russian Guild of Film Critics | Best Foreign Actress | Onegin | Nominated | |
| 2001 | Phoenix Film Critics Society | Best Cast | The Lord of the Rings: The Fellowship of the Ring | Won | |
| 2001 | Screen Actors Guild Award | Outstanding Performance by a Cast | The Lord of the Rings: The Fellowship of the Ring | Nominated | |
| 2002 | Online Film Critics Society | Best Ensemble | The Lord of the Rings: The Two Towers | Won | |
| 2002 | Phoenix Film Critics Society | Best Cast | The Lord of the Rings: The Two Towers | Won | |
| 2002 | Screen Actors Guild Award | Outstanding Performance by a Cast | The Lord of the Rings: The Two Towers | Nominated | |
| 2003 | Broadcast Film Critics Association | Best Cast | The Lord of the Rings: The Return of the King | Won | |
| 2003 | National Board of Review | Best Cast | The Lord of the Rings: The Return of the King | Won | |
| 2003 | Phoenix Film Critics Society | Best Ensemble | The Lord of the Rings: The Return of the King | Nominated | |
| 2003 | Screen Actors Guild Award | Outstanding Performance by a Cast | The Lord of the Rings: The Return of the King | Won | |
| 2008 | Scream Award | Best Horror Actress | The Strangers | Won | |
| 2008 | Teen Choice Award | Choice Actress: Horror/Thriller | The Strangers | Nominated | |
