= Sick of Myself =

Sick of Myself may refer to:

- "Sick of Myself" (song), a from Matthew Sweet's 1995 album 100% Fun
- Sick of Myself (film), the English-language translation of Syk Pike, a 2023 film by Kristoffer Borgli
