= The Hogyssey =

Studio album by Spacehog
- Released: 10 April 2001
- Recorded: November 1999; Mixing: November 2000
- Genre: Alternative rock, glam rock
- Length: 62:46
- Label: Artemis
- Producer: Sean Slade, Paul Ebersold, Bryce Goggin, Paul Q. Kolderie

Spacehog chronology
The Chinese Album (1998)	The Hogyssey (2001)	As It Is on Earth (2013)

The Hogyssey is the third album from rock band Spacehog.

The album was released on compact disc by Artemis Records on 10 April 2001. The title track is a rock arrangement of Richard Strauss's Also Sprach Zarathustra, similar to Eumir Deodato's "Also Sprach Zarathustra (2001)". The album was recorded at Ardent Studios in Memphis, Tennessee.

The Hogyssey went through several name changes. The original name was This Is America and later named 2001: A Space Hogyssey after the title track. Then, after a lawsuit threat, the album was renamed again as The Hogyssey.

== Critical reception ==
Professional ratings
Review scores
Source	Rating
AllMusic	2.5/5 stars

John Duffy of AllMusic commended the attempt to recapture the Resident Alien sound through impactful and inspired riffs but was critical of the band copying themselves and their "Zarathustra" reworking being "downright ill-advised", concluding that: "Crunchy guitars aside, perhaps Hogyssey is a misstep for Langdon and company." PopMatters contributor Devon Powers also noted the band's return to the intergalactic soundscape of their first record but felt it was outdated, calling it competently made but unconvincing, despite the tracks emitting a charm and wit to them from even the weaker cuts, saying "they spend too little time taking alternative rock – which, arguably, they're one of the few purveyors of these days – to a place where it's doing something new." Mac Randall of Rolling Stone felt the band's penchant for loud and catchy melodies had diminished when songs like "This Is America" and the title track "go beyond camp into the realm of the truly embarrassing", but highlighted "Jupiter's Moon", "Perpetual Drag" and "At Least I Got Laid" for being able to "justify the bombast with irresistible choruses, indicating that given the right material, the 'Hog can still snort with the best of 'em."

== Track listing ==
All tracks are written by Royston Langdon, except where noted.

No.	Title	Writer(s)	Length
1.	"Jupiter's Moon"		3:46
2.	"This Is America"	Antony Langdon, R. Langdon	4:12
3.	"I Want to Live"		4:30
4.	"Earthquake"		2:49
5.	"A Real Waste of Food"		4:40
6.	"Perpetual Drag"		3:49
7.	"Dancing on My Own"		5:54
8.	"And It Is"		4:54
9.	"The Hogyssey"	Richard Strauss	2:37
10.	"The Strangest Dream"		4:12
11.	"At Least I Got Laid"		3:49
12.	"The Horror"		17:25

Notes

- The song "The Horror" ends at 4:47. After 11 minutes of silence (4:47–15:47), begins the hidden track "I Can't Hear You".

== Personnel ==
- Royston Langdon – bass guitar, vocals
- Antony Langdon – guitar, vocals
- Jonny Cragg – drums
- Richard Steel – lead guitar
