= The Chinese Album =

Studio album by Spacehog
- Released: March 10, 1998
- Genre: Glam rock
- Length: 41:40
- Labels: Sire; Warner Bros.
- Producers: Bryce Goggin, Spacehog

Spacehog chronology
Resident Alien (1995)	The Chinese Album (1998)	The Hogyssey (2001)

Singles from The Chinese Album
- 1. "Mungo City" Released: 1998; 2. "Carry On" Released: June 8, 1998

The Chinese Album is the second album from the expatriate British alternative rock band Spacehog. It was released on Sire Records in 1998.

The Chinese Album was considered for a soundtrack and basis of a film called Mungo City (later called The Chinese Movie). It was to be about a band that moves to Hong Kong for success after being rejected by a New York record company. Unsatisfied with the final script, Spacehog dismissed any plans for shooting.

Spacehog wrote and recorded 20 songs for The Chinese Album. Among these are the B-sides "Final Frontier", "Isle of Manhattan" and "Cryogenic Lover", which were released on European singles.

"Carry On" peaked at No. 43 on the UK Singles Chart where as "Mungo City" peaked at 79.

== Critical reception ==
Professional ratings
Review scores
Source	Rating
AllMusic	4/5 stars
The Encyclopedia of Popular Music	3/5 stars
Entertainment Weekly	B+
MusicHound Rock: The Essential Album Guide	3.5/5 stars
Pitchfork Media	5.4/10

The A.V. Club wrote that "for the most part, The Chinese Album sounds like Aladdin Sane or Roxy Music's early material, stripped of any sense of commitment or adventure." The Orlando Sentinel wrote that "one can only admire a group so unrepentantly unfashionable, especially when it stirs its influences together with such flair and flamboyance." The Austin Chronicle called the album "a pretty, precious confection of pop ditties." The Rough Guide to Rock deemed it "a beautifully crafted masterpiece, intelligent, edgy and eclectic."

== Track listing ==
All songs by Royston Langdon except when noted.

1. "One of These Days" (David Byrne, Jerry Harrison, Tina Weymouth, Chris Frantz, Brian Eno, Royston Langdon) - 3:35
2. "Goodbye Violet Race" - 4:00
3. "Lucy's Shoe" - 4:13
4. "Mungo City" - 4:34
5. "Skylark" (Antony Langdon) - 1:57
6. "Sand in Your Eyes" - 3:49
7. "Captain Freeman" (Antony Langdon) - 2:27
8. "2nd Avenue" (Royston Langdon, N. Chassler) - 2:58
9. "Almond Kisses" (featuring Michael Stipe) (Antony Langdon) - 2:44
10. "Carry On" - 3:33
11. "Anonymous" (Royston Langdon, Antony Langdon) - 3:37
12. "Beautiful Girl" - 4:09

== Personnel ==
- Royston Langdon – bass guitar and vocals
- Antony Langdon – guitar and vocals
- Jonny Cragg – drums
- Richard Steel – lead guitar

== Samples ==
- "One of These Days" contains a sample of "Seen and Not Seen" by Talking Heads from their 1980 album Remain in Light.
