= Hempilation: Freedom Is NORML =

Compilation album by Various Artists
- Released: November 1995
- Genre: Rock
- Length: 73:25
- Label: Capricorn Records
- Producer: Steve Bloom, Eric Steenstra, Philip Walden

Various Artists chronology
Hempilation: Freedom Is NORML (1995)	Hempilation, Vol. 2: Free the Weed (1998)

Professional ratings
Review scores
Source	Rating
AllMusic	(not rated) link
The WELL	(not rated) link
Washington City Paper	(not rated) link

Hempilation: Freedom Is NORML is the first CD compilation album to benefit the organization NORML, released in November 1995. The songs that appear on the album all have marijuana as the subject matter. As of the end of 1998 Hempilation sold more than 110,000 units, and raised more than $90,000 for NORML. Due to the album's success, there would be a second compilation done by the group, which would appear three years after the first compilation.

== Background ==
The following information was found in the first two pages of the liner notes of the CD booklet:

The idea for this album came about after Steve Bloom, a member of High Times magazine (and one of the producers of "Hempilation") left a record release party for a PETA benefit album called "Tame Yourself". He thought since top bands can get behind a cause and make a difference, why not try the same concept to benefit the people at NORML?

It was decided that the album needed to be created after finding several of the bands that were fans of the magazine and supporters of the legalization movement, other bands prior to the album took part in a "Rock For Pot" benefit concert, and a successful sponsored tour of one of the contributing bands by both of the organizations.

The proceeds from the sale of this album, organized by the people at High Times Magazine, went to benefit the NORML organization. It was also created as a way to contribute to NORML anonymously. However, there is also a membership form that was included in the CD booklet if the purchaser wanted to do more. The website given on the form to join NORML (http://www.calyx.com/-norml%5B%5D) is no longer active, but has been moved to https://secure.norml.org/join/.

== Track listing ==
1. "Rainy Day Women ♯12 & 35" performed by The Black Crowes - 3:37
  ^{Originally performed by Bob Dylan on the album Blonde on Blonde}
2. "I Want to Take You Higher" performed by Blues Traveler - 5:30
  ^{Originally performed by Sly and the Family Stone on the album Stand!}
3. "I Wanna Get High" performed by Cypress Hill - 3:40
  ^{Originally on the band's album Black Sunday}
4. "I Like Marijuana" performed by David Peel and the 360's - 4:55
  ^{Originally on the band's album Have A Marijuana}
5. "Don't Step on the Grass, Sam" performed by Gov't Mule - 5:40
  ^{Originally performed by Steppenwolf on the album The Second}
6. "Who's Got the Herb?" performed by 311 - 4:48
  ^{Originally performed by Human Rights on the album I Luv}
7. "Convicted" performed by Hater - 1:10
  ^{Exclusive to this compilation album}
8. "Sweet Leaf" performed by Sacred Reich - 5:00
  ^{Originally performed by Black Sabbath on the album Master of Reality}
9. "Smokin' Cheeba Cheeba" performed by The High Fidelity - 5:16
  ^{Originally performed by The Harlem Underground Band}
10. "Champagne & Reefer" performed by The Ian Moore Band - 6:02
  ^{Originally performed by Muddy Waters on the album King Bee}
11. "Legalize It" performed by Sublime - 4:19
  ^{Originally performed by Peter Tosh on the album Legalize It}
12. "In the Flow" performed by Ziggy Marley and the Melody Makers - 4:29
  ^{Originally on the band's album Free Like We Want 2 B}
13. "And It Stoned Me" performed by Widespread Panic - 5:41
  ^{Originally performed by Van Morrison on the album Moondance}
14. "Homegrown" performed by Gus - 2:27
  ^{Originally performed by Neil Young and Crazy Horse on the album American Stars 'n Bars}
15. "High Time We Went" performed by Screamin' Cheetah Wheelies - 3:54
  ^{Originally performed by Joe Cocker on the single High Time We Went}
16. "Pot Head Pixies" performed by Raging Slab - 2:50
  ^{Originally performed by Gong on the album Flying Teapot}
17. "Too Rolling Stoned" performed by Drivin N Cryin with Warren Haynes - 4:37
  ^{Originally performed by Robin Trower on the album Bridge of Sighs}

Track info taken from CD liner notes and order/performers/times can be verified on AllMusic.com

== Credits ==
Information taken from Liner Notes on back page of CD booklet.

- Production Director: Robert Vega
- Art Direction: Diane Painter
- Design: Beth Lee @Ikon
- Photography: Hyram Williams
