= Everything (band) =

American band

Background information
- Origin: Harrisonburg, Virginia, United States
- Genres: Rock
- Years active: 1989–present
- Labels: Full Tube Records; Capricorn Records; The Blackbird Recording Company; Sire Records; What Are Records
- Members: Nathan Brown; Craig Honeycutt; David Slankard; Stephen Van Dam
- Website: http://www.thebandeverything.com

Everything is an American alternative rock band from Harrisonburg, Virginia, best known for their 1998 single "Hooch", being considered a "one-hit wonder" by some.

== History ==
Everything was formed in 1989 by students at James Madison University, in their hometown of Harrisonburg, Virginia. Going on the road fulltime in 1992, they played several hundred gigs a year for nearly the next decade, starting in the Mid-Atlantic United States before gradually expanding their grassroots fanbase and touring further regions throughout the country. The band released their first three albums independently, selling almost 30,000 copies before signing a brief and ill-fated deal with Capricorn Records in 1995.

Larger-scale success came when Everything signed with indie label Blackbird who funded the recording of their album Super Natural (1998), and whose uplift venture with Sire/London eventually provided the radio and distribution muscle to promote their single "Hooch" to major radio stations around the world. Their peak of popularity came in 1998, when "Hooch" (from the Super Natural album) was featured in Adam Sandler's movie The Waterboy. The song peaked at No. 69 on the Billboard Hot 100, but fared better on the Hot Adult Contemporary and Modern Rock charts. The band reveled in their "fifteen minutes" of fame, playing various radio shows and festival crowds around the country. Over the years, "Hooch" has been heard in episodes of My Name Is Earl (2005-2009), Raising Hope (2010-2014), Yes, Dear (2000-2006) and Clueless (1998-2002), and also was featured on the soundtrack of the first season of the show Scrubs.

Following the AOL/Time Warner merger, and the subsequent dissolution of all joint ventures under the Warner Music Group umbrella, the band was independent once again; they released People Are Moving (2001) in a co-distribution deal with the What Are Records? label. They toured internationally in Japan and Korea, before finally deciding to take a hiatus; the group reconvened in 2004 to record the album In the Juju Underworld, which was not released until 2006.

== Band members ==
- Richard Bradley (tenor sax, guitar, vocals)
- Nate Brown (drums, percussion, vocals)
- Craig Honeycutt (guitar, lead vocals)
- Mark Reinhardt (keyboards, trumpet, trombone, vocals)
- David Slankard (bass)
- Stephen Van Dam (guitar, alto sax, clarinet, vocals)
- Terence 'Wolfe' Quinn (keyboards, trombone)

Other members

- Pete Cordo (roadie)
- Shaw Garrison (road manager)
- Terry Harrison (multimedia light shows)
- Ryan Nichols (sound)
- Randy Reed (manager)
- Jon Bradner (marketing/development)
- Doug Wannamaker (keyboards)
- James Brown (banjo)

== Discography ==
=== Studio albums ===
- Play (1991)
- Solid (1992)
- Labrador (1994)
- Super Natural (1998) #173 US
- People Are Moving (2001)
- In the Juju Underworld (2006)

=== Live albums ===
- Everything (Live) (1996)

=== Singles ===
Year	Song	Peak chart positions			Album
Year	Song	US Hot 100	US Mod Rock	US Mainstream Top 40	Album
1995	"Spent"	—	—	—	Labrador
1998	"Hooch"	69	12	17	Super Natural
1998	"Free To Choose"	—	—	—	Hempilation, Vol. 2: Free the Weed
1998	"Father Christmas"	—	—	—	99x Deck The Hall Ball; 1998 (Compilation)
1999	"Good Thing"	—	—	—	Super Natural
1999	"Young Americans"	—	—	—	Drop Dead Gorgeous (Soundtrack)
2001	"Unconditional"	—	—	—	People Are Moving
