= Hempilation, Vol. 2: Free the Weed =

Compilation album by Various Artists
- Released: November 3, 1998
- Genre: Rock
- Length: 76:20
- Label: Capricorn Records
- Producer: Steve Bloom, Eric Steenstra, Philip Walden

Various Artists chronology
Hempilation: Freedom Is NORML' (1995)	Hempilation, Vol. 2: Free the Weed (1998)

Professional ratings
Review scores
Source	Rating
Allmusic	2.5/5 stars
American Reporter	(positive)
Metro Times	(positive)

Hempilation, Vol. 2: Free the Weed is the second compilation album to benefit the organization NORML, following up 1995's Hempilation: Freedom Is NORML. Like the first compilation, the album itself brought attention to the marijuana legalization issue.

== Track listing ==
1. Free to Choose (Everything)
2. U.S. Custom Coast Guard Dope Dog (George Clinton)
3. Weed (To the Rescue) (Vic Chesnutt)
4. Sidemousin' the Bong (Mike Watt)
5. Don't Bogart Me (Robert Bradley)
6. Long Haired Country Boy (From Good Homes)
7. Me and Paul (Willie Nelson)
8. Play the Greed (Dar Williams)
9. The Joker (Michael Franti & Spearhead)
10. Smoke 'Em (Fun Lovin' Criminals)
11. Under Me Sensi (Long Beach Dub Allstars)
12. Let Me Roll It (Big Sugar)
13. High (Jimmie's Chicken Shack)
14. 30 Days in the Hole (Gov't Mule)
15. Let's Get High (Letters To Cleo)
16. If You're a Viper (Wayne Kramer of MC5)
17. Light Up or Leave Me Alone (Freddy Jones Band)
18. One Toke Over the Line (Brewer & Shipley, Rainmakers)
19. Mary Jane (Blue Mountain)
20. The Dope Smoking Song (Hank Flamingo)
