= Sean Dixon =

Sean Dixon or similar may refer to:

- Sean Dixon (ice hockey) in 1999 NHL entry draft
- Sean Dixon (writer), Canadian playwright and novelist
- Shaun Dixon, a TV actor starring in Dhar Mann Studios
- Sean Dixon (motorcyclist) in 1991 United States motorcycle Grand Prix
- Sean Dixon (musician), drummer for the band Zammuto

== See also ==
- Sean Dickson (disambiguation)
