= Lovegod =

Studio album by the Soup Dragons
- Released: April 1990
- Recorded: 1989
- Studio: Livingston, London
- Genre: Alternative rock, alternative dance
- Length: 40:55
- Label: Big Life
- Producer: Sean Dickson, George Shilling

The Soup Dragons chronology
This Is Our Art (1988)	Lovegod (1990)	Hotwired (1992)

Lovegod is the second studio album by the Soup Dragons, released in 1990. Four songs from the album were released as singles—"Backwards Dog", "Crotch Deep Trash", "Mother Universe" and "I'm Free". The last, a cover of a Rolling Stones cut from their 1965 album Out of Our Heads, made the top 5 in the UK charts. First pressings did not include "I'm Free", but it was subsequently placed first on the re-release, which also dates to 1990.

The album peaked at No. 7 on the UK Albums Chart. It peaked at No. 88 on the Billboard 200. The video for "I'm Free" made it to the top spot on MTV's most requested list.

The cover art for the album depicts a zoomed in Mandelbrot set.

== Critical reception ==
Professional ratings
Review scores
Source	Rating
AllMusic	3/5 stars
The Encyclopedia of Popular Music	3/5 stars
Entertainment Weekly	C
MusicHound Rock: The Essential Album Guide	4/5 stars
The Rolling Stone Album Guide	1.5/5 stars

Trouser Press called the album "an effective, accessible (if ultimately tedious) trip of house-geared rhythms, semi-firm melodies and singer/guitarist/programmer Sean Dickson’s obviously mind-expanded lyrics." Spin deemed it "well-crafted danceable rock with immaculate production."

== Track listing ==
All songs by Sean Dickson except where noted.

1. "I'm Free" (featuring Junior Reid) (Mick Jagger, Keith Richards) – 3:58
2. "Mother Universe" – 3:43
3. "Backwards Dog" – 2:17
4. "Softly" – 2:55
5. "Drive the Pain" – 2:20
6. "Lovegod" – 3:38
7. "Dream-E-Forever" – 2:14
8. "Sweetmeat" – 4:22
9. "Kiss the Gun" – 2:31
10. "Love You to Death" – 2:40
11. "Beauty Freak" – 3:07
12. "Lovegod Dub" – 4:14
13. "Crotch Deep Trash" – 2:56

== Personnel ==
The Soup Dragons

- Sean Dickson – vocals, guitar, keyboards, programming
- Jim McCullough – backing vocals, guitar
- Sushil K. Dade – bass guitar
- Paul Quinn – drums, percussion

== Charts ==
Chart performance for Lovegod
Chart (1990–1991)	Peak position
Australian Albums (ARIA)	54
New Zealand Albums (RMNZ)	27
UK Albums (OCC)	7
US Billboard 200	88

== Certifications ==
Region	Certification	Certified units/sales
United Kingdom (BPI)	Silver	60,000^{^}
^{^} Shipments figures based on certification alone.
