= This Is Our Art =

Studio album by the Soup Dragons
- Released: 1988
- Studios: Picnic, West Peckham, Kent; The Chocolate Factory, London; Power Plant, Willesden, London
- Genres: Rock, pop
- Label: Sire
- Producers: Julian Standen, Pete Brown

The Soup Dragons chronology
Hang-Ten! (1987)	This Is Our Art (1988)	Lovegod (1990)

This Is Our Art is the debut studio album by the Scottish band the Soup Dragons, released in 1988.

The album peaked at No. 60 on the UK Albums Chart.

== Critical reception ==
Professional ratings
Review scores
Source	Rating
AllMusic	2.5/5 stars
The Encyclopedia of Popular Music	2/5 stars
MusicHound Rock: The Essential Album Guide	2.5/5 stars
The Rolling Stone Album Guide	1.5/5 stars

Trouser Press wrote that the album demonstrates "an amazing range, yet there’s something insincere about these songs, which seemingly don’t know when to end." The Washington Post stated that it displays "a deft, if overreaching, eclecticism."

The Toronto Star deemed This Is Our Art "spikey guitar pop." The Omaha World-Herald called it "catchier and more melodic" than the band's debut.

AllMusic noted that "the Soup Dragons are far more effective when they're gorging themselves on bubblegum like the sweet jangle pop of 'Soft As Your Face' and 'Turning Stone'." The Rolling Stone Album Guide panned the "astonishingly pointless stylistic range."

== Track listing ==
All tracks are written by Sean Dickson, except where noted.

No.	Title	Writer(s)	Length
1.	"Kingdom Chairs"		5:20
2.	"Great Empty Space"		3:01
3.	"The Majestic Head?"		3:34
4.	"Turning Stone"		2:48
5.	"Vacate My Space"		3:39
6.	"On Overhead Walkways"		2:25
7.	"Passion Protein"		5:22
8.	"King of the Castle"		2:46
9.	"Soft as Your Face"		3:39
10.	"Family Ways"		4:38
11.	"Another Dreamticket"	music: Sushil K. Dade; lyrics: Sean Dickson	2:58

== Personnel ==
The Soup Dragons

- Sean Dickson - vocals, guitar
- Jim McCulloch - guitar, backing vocals
- Sushil K. Dade - bass
- Ross Sinclair - drums

with:

- Dean Klavett, Kevin Malpass - keyboards
