= Royston Langdon =

British musician

- Also known as: Ray Sprinkles, LEEDS
- Born: Royston William Langdon; 1 May 1972 (age 54); Leeds, West Yorkshire, England
- Genres: Glam rock; alternative rock; Britpop
- Occupations: Singer; songwriter; bass guitarist
- Years active: 1994–present
- Label: Elektra Records
- Spouse: Liv Tyler (m. 2003; div. 2008)

Royston William Langdon (born 1 May 1972) is an English musician who is the lead singer and bassist of the English-American glam rock band Spacehog.

== Life and career ==
Langdon was born on 1 May 1972 in Leeds. When he was young, he and his older brother Antony joined the Leeds Parish Church choir; the two of them would later found Spacehog in 1994, with Antony playing rhythm guitar in the band. Langdon wanted to become a photographer and artist and dreamed of attending Saint Martin's School of Art in London. At 16, he was expelled from school.

Shortly after Spacehog was formed, Langdon moved to New York City, where he met Bryce Goggin. The two became friends, and Goggin would produce Spacehog's best known song, "In the Meantime".

Langdon was among candidates to front Velvet Revolver after the band split from singer Scott Weiland. "We've played with Royston from Spacehog," said Duff McKagan, "and he was probably 95 percent there, but you can't put a finger on what was missing."

== Personal life ==
From 25 March 2003 to April 2008 he was married to American actress Liv Tyler, with whom he has a son, Milo William Langdon (born 14 December 2004).
