= I'm Free (Rolling Stones song) =

1965 single by The Rolling Stones

Song by the Rolling Stones

from the album Out of Our Heads
- A-side: "Get off of My Cloud" (US)
- Released: 25 October 1965
- Recorded: 6 September 1965
- Studio: RCA, Hollywood, California
- Genre: Rock; folk rock
- Length: 2:24
- Label: London
- Songwriter: Jagger/Richards
- Producer: Andrew Loog Oldham

"I'm Free" is a song by English rock band the Rolling Stones, written by Mick Jagger and Keith Richards, and first released as the final track on their third album, Out of Our Heads (1965). It was also released at the same time as a single in the US and later included on the American December's Children (And Everybody's) album.

== Release ==
The Rolling Stones recorded a re-worked acoustic version for their 1995 album Stripped, and performed a live version in the 2008 film Shine a Light, which was included on the accompanying live album. The song was also performed at the free concert in Hyde Park, London, on 5 July 1969, released on the DVD The Stones in the Park in 2006.

In 2007, a remixed version of the original recording was used in a television commercial for the Chase Freedom credit card and in 2008 it was used in a UK commercial for a Renault SUV. This version clearly is lifting The Soup Dragons re-write without any permission ever given by the Stones to Sean Dickson's version.

The original vinyl bootleg Live'r Than You'll Ever Be included a live version recorded in Oakland, California, in November 1969.

It appears on the Rolling Stones live album Get Yer Ya-Ya's Out! as a re-release bonus track, following "Under My Thumb" without a break.

== Music and reception ==
Rolling Stone magazine ranked "I'm Free" as the 78th greatest Rolling Stones song, saying: "A tambourine-spangled folk rocker with chime-y, Byrds-like guitar, this offhandedly libertarian tune wasn't a big hit, but it's one of the Sixties' most pliant anthems." The Guardian identified the song as an example of the improving songwriting of Jagger and Richards at the time, describing the song as "gleefully hymning the arrogance of youth".

Cash Box described it as a "raunchy, hard-driving emotion-packed romancer".

== Personnel ==
- Mick Jagger – lead vocals, backing vocals
- Keith Richards – lead guitar, backing vocals
- Brian Jones – rhythm guitar, organ
- Bill Wyman – bass guitar
- Charlie Watts – drums
- James W. Alexander – tambourine

== The Soup Dragons version ==
"I'm Free"

Single by the Soup Dragons featuring Junior Reid

from the album Lovegod
- Released: 1990
- Genre: Rock; baggy
- Length: 3:58 (album version); 3:29 (radio edit)
- Label: Big Life
- Songwriter: Jagger/Richards/arr: Dickson
- Producers: Sean Dickson; George Shilling

The Soup Dragons singles chronology
"Mother Universe" (1990)	"I'm Free" (1990)	"Electric Blues" (1991)

Scottish alternative rock/dance band the Soup Dragons re-wrote and rearranged the song in 1989 released in 1990. Their version completely rewrites the song by Sean Dickson from the band and contains a toasted verse by Junior Reid also written by Sean Dickson and interpolated by Junior. Sean Dickson was not given a song writing credit at the time even though it is a re-write and to this day has to put up with an arrangement credit. Jagger / Richards /arr: Dickson which appears on every copy.

Future versions by Pitbull and Dua Lipa cover The Soup Dragons re-write and not the original Stones version. Yves Saint Laurent used a version of The Soup Dragons re-write in a major advertising campaign.

The single was released by label Big Life and became the band's biggest hit, reaching the top ten in the UK, USA, Australia and New Zealand, and charted in other countries as well. The Soup Dragons' version was featured in the films Big Girls Don't Cry... They Get Even, The World's End and Renfield.

=== Critical reception ===
Reviewing the single, David Giles of Music Week stated that the Soup Dragons "have fashioned a thoroughly contemporary piece of music that could well pay off at a commercial level".

=== Charts ===
==== Weekly charts ====
Chart (1990–1991)	Peak position
Australia (ARIA)	9
Austria (Ö3 Austria Top 40)	26
Belgium (Ultratop 50 Flanders)	38
Europe (Eurochart Hot 100)	16
France (SNEP)	33
Ireland (IRMA)	15
Israel (Israeli Singles Chart)	7
Luxembourg (Radio Luxembourg)	4
Netherlands (Dutch Top 40 Tipparade)	9
Netherlands (Single Top 100)	52
New Zealand (Recorded Music NZ)	6
UK Singles (Official Charts)	5
UK Dance (Music Week)	6
US Billboard Hot 100	79
US Alternative Airplay (Billboard)	2
US Dance Club Songs (Billboard)	20

==== Year-end charts ====
Chart (1990)	Position
UK Singles (OCC)	40
US Modern Rock Tracks (Billboard)	12

Chart (1991)	Position
Australia (ARIA)	61

=== Release history ===
Region	Date	Format(s)	Label(s)	Ref.
United Kingdom	1990	7-inch vinyl; 12-inch vinyl; CD; cassette	Big Life	
Japan	25 October 1990	Mini-CD	Polydor	
Australia	5 November 1990	7-inch vinyl; cassette	Big Life; Polydor	
Australia	3 December 1990	12-inch vinyl	Big Life; Polydor	
Australia	18 February 1991	CD	Big Life; Polydor	

== Other versions ==
- Pitbull heavily interpolated "I'm Free" in his song "Freedom" from the album Climate Change, which was featured on the soundtrack of the 2017 film Ferdinand.
- Dua Lipa sang a special version in a TV commercial for Yves Saint Laurent 2019 (released 2021).
