= Spacehog =

English rock band

- Origin: New York City, United States
- Genres: Alternative rock; glam rock; Britpop
- Years active: 1994–2001, 2006–2014, 2025–present
- Labels: Sire/Elektra, Artemis
- Spinoffs: Arckid
- Members: Royston Langdon; Antony Langdon; Jonny Cragg; Richard Steel
- Past members: Robert Curreri
- Website: https://www.spacehog.band

Spacehog are an English alternative rock band, formed by four British men living in New York City. The band members are lead vocalist and bassist Royston Langdon, rhythm guitarist Anthony Langdon, drummer Jonny Cragg and lead guitarist Richard Steel. The band released three studio albums between 1994 and 2001, and one more after reuniting in 2006. Their musical style is a blend of alternative rock and Britpop of the 1990s, with glam rock and space rock of the 1970s, influenced by David Bowie, Queen, T. Rex and Slade.

The band are known for their onstage theatrics, such as the Langdons dressing like The Spiders from Mars, guitarist Richard Steel playing solos with a foot up on his monitor and drummer Jonny Cragg twirling his drumsticks and lighting his gong on fire, and the 1996 single "In the Meantime". As such, they have been labeled a one-hit wonder by some music critics.

== History ==
Though all the band members are from Leeds, West Yorkshire, Spacehog were formed in New York City. Antony Langdon met Jonny Cragg by chance in a café where Cragg supposedly had a job killing rats. Soon after, Langdon's brother Royston joined the band, and Spacehog was born. The band's original guitarist, Robert Curreri, was asked to leave the band, and Cragg's friend Richard Steel replaced him in 1994. The band signed in 1994 with Seymour Stein to Sire Records.

On 24 October 1995, Spacehog released their first album, Resident Alien. It went gold on the Billboard charts, selling over 500,000 copies and spawned the hit single and video "In the Meantime" as well as the single "Cruel to Be Kind". "In the Meantime" received heavy video and radio play and was used as background music to BBC's Match of the Day football programme. The band performed the song on Channel 4's TFI Friday in 1996. The band's second album, The Chinese Album, was released on 10 March 1998. Though it did not sell as well as Resident Alien, the band's popularity continued to increase as Spacehog opened for more popular acts such as Pearl Jam and Supergrass. The Chinese Album had a more "artsy" sound, with the Pink Floyd-like piano on the opening track and Michael Stipe of R.E.M. contributing vocals to the song "Almond Kisses".

After the band were dropped by Elektra Records, Spacehog signed with the upstart label Artemis Records and released their third album, The Hogyssey, on 10 April 2001. The album continued the band's neo-glam approach and included the singles "I Want to Live" and "At Least I Got Laid", as well as a funk version of Richard Strauss's "Also sprach Zarathustra". The band joined The Black Crowes and Oasis on the Tour of Brotherly Love in support of the album, which proved to be the band's final major tour for several years.

Royston Langdon and American actress Liv Tyler became engaged in February 2001, and married in Barbados on 25 March 2003. In December 2004, she gave birth to their son, Milo William Langdon. On 8 May 2008, the couple confirmed through representatives that they would be separating but remain friends.

=== Arckid ===
Antony, Royston, and Christian Langdon then pooled their resources to form Arckid. By June 2006, they had recorded eight songs with Bryce Goggin at Trout Studios in Brooklyn. Jonny Cragg joined The Twenty-Twos as their drummer post-Spacehog, but has since rejoined the Langdon brothers in Arckid.

At the end of November 2006, Antony Langdon left Arckid on good terms and had devised an alter ego known as "Louis Arogant". This project was near completion as a record entitled Victoria: an homage to Langdon's love for his wife, the director Victoria Clay de Mendoza. The album was intended to release at the end of 2007 but was never released. He also continued in the production of his television work. Also in the works was an album by Antony Langdon and Joaquin Phoenix. The project was called This Lady Is a Tramp and was being mixed by Paul McKenna with help from Creation Records founder Alan McGee and the Charlatans’ Tim Burgess.

Antony Langdon was briefly replaced in Arckid by Your Vegas guitarist Mat Steel, who subsequently left Arckid after they shot their first video to rejoin Your Vegas. Pete Denton of Cube and Kid Symphony fame joined Arckid for a short period of time. Richard Steel accompanied the three members of Arckid on stage during the Hilfiger Sessions NY and the 2007 Lollapalooza gigs.

=== Reunion ===
In July 2008, Spacehog reunited to play two shows, the first at the Viper Room and the second at Troubador. Drummer Jonny Cragg posted on the Arckid MySpace page that Spacehog would be reuniting and would begin work on a new record. In July 2009, Spacehog reunited at Spaceland in Los Angeles. In March 2025, Spacehog announced they were reforming for a US tour with fellow Brits EMF.

=== I'm Still Here ===
In 2010, Spacehog guitarist Antony Langdon gained notoriety for his role in the controversial mockumentary I'm Still Here, starring Joaquin Phoenix. Langdon, who was one of Phoenix's assistants as well as a musical partner, staged a falling-out with the actor during the documentary's filming and is shown defecating on the troubled actor in retaliation for an earlier argument. In an earlier part of the film, there is a similarly shocking scene involving Langdon getting out of the shower.

Langdon's time in Spacehog is not mentioned in the film, but a clip of the band performing on television is shown. Royston Langdon is also credited for one of the film's songs.

The film's cinematographer, Magdalena Górka, sued director Casey Affleck for multiple complaints. She alleged Antony Langdon, who worked as the camera assistant, was one of the crew members who subjected her to "routine instances" of sexual harassment.

=== As It Is on Earth ===
On 17 September 2011, Spacehog announced the completion of a new album, As It Is on Earth, on their MySpace page. Despite this, it wasn't released until over a year later on 16 April 2013. Their first album in over a decade, it was released on the band’s own Hog Space Records and distributed by Redeye Distribution. The album continues the band's glam-influenced sound, with "fist-pumping" anthems ("Gluttony"), reminiscent of David Bowie and Queen, and slower ballads ("Cool Water"). Joe Gross of Rolling Stone rated the album three out of five stars, finding it a breath of fresh air from bands like the Lumineers and Animal Collective.

== Musical style ==
Spacehog are primary an alternative rock band, known for their distinct mix of post-grunge of the 1990s with glam rock and space rock influences from the 1970s, such as David Bowie, Queen, T. Rex and Slade. Steve Huey of AllMusic described the band's style as a "wall-of-distorted-guitars," while Hal B. Selzer of The Aquarian Weekly claimed their "semi-glam sound," mixed with distorted guitars and melodic basslines was a contrast to the doomy and gloomy grunge of the time. Additionally, as British men based in New York City, they're seen as a middle ground between Britpop and American grunge, with the hooks and humor of the former, and the power chords of the latter.

While acclaimed for their unique sound, music critics have compared Spacehog to contemporary acts, such as American rock band Stone Temple Pilots on their third studio album, Tiny Music... Songs from the Vatican Gift Shop (1996), and Belgian electronic band Soulwax, who similarly take influence from 1970s pop rock, such as Badfinger, on their second studio album, Much Against Everyone's Advice (1998).

== Members ==
- Royston Langdon a.k.a. "Ray Sprinkles" (born Royston William Langdon, 1 May 1972) – bass guitar, lead vocals, keyboards & backing vocals.
- Antony Langdon a.k.a. "Tone Down" (born Antony Chester Langdon, 14 May 1968) – rhythm guitar, backing and lead vocals
- Jonny Cragg a.k.a. "Corky" (born 18 July 1966) – drums, backing vocals
- Richard Steel a.k.a. "Rich" (born 12 November 1968) – lead guitar, backing vocals

== Discography ==
=== Studio albums ===
Title	Details	Peak chart positions				Certifications (sales threshold)
Title	Details	UK	AUS	CAN	US	Certifications (sales threshold)
Resident Alien	Release date: 24 October 1995; Label: Sire; Formats: CD, Cassette, LP	40	50	19	49	MC: Platinum; RIAA: Gold
The Chinese Album	Release date: 10 March 1998; Label: Sire; Formats: CD, Cassette, Vinyl	126	—	—	—	
The Hogyssey	Release date: 10 April 2001; Label: Artemis; Formats: CD	—	—	—	—	
As It Is on Earth	Release date: 16 April 2013; Label: Hog Space Records; Formats: CD	—	—	—	—	
"—" denotes releases that did not chart

=== EPs ===
- Hamsters of Rock (Sire, 1996)
- 4 Future Tracks (Artemis, 2001)

=== Singles ===
Year	Title	Chart peak positions									Album
Year	Title	UK	AUS	CAN	CAN Alt.	NZ	SWE	US	US Main.	US Mod.	Album
1996	"In the Meantime"	29	40	33	6	45	36	32	1	2	Resident Alien
1996	"Cruel to Be Kind"	—	—	—	—	—	—	—	29	—	Resident Alien
1996	"Space Is the Place"	145	—	—	—	—	—	—	—	—	Resident Alien
1998	"Mungo City"	79	—	—	—	—	—	—	19	21	The Chinese Album
1998	"Carry On"	43	—	—	—	—	—	—	—	—	The Chinese Album
2001	"I Want to Live"	—	—	—	—	—	—	—	23	—	The Hogyssey
