= Hotwired (The Soup Dragons album) =

Studio album by the Soup Dragons
- Released: 21 April 1992
- Recorded: 1991
- Studios: Livingston, London, Advision, Brighton
- Genres: Alternative rock, alternative dance
- Length: 49:22
- Label: Big Life/Mercury
- Producers: Marius De Vries, Sean Dickson, Steve Sidelnyk

The Soup Dragons chronology
Lovegod (1990)	Hotwired (1992)	Hydrophonic (1994)

Singles from Hotwired
- 1. "Divine Thing" Released: 1992; 2. "Pleasure" Released: 1992

Hotwired is the third studio album by the Scottish band the Soup Dragons. It was released on April 21, 1992.

The album peaked at No. 97 on the Billboard 200. "Pleasure" and "Divine Thing" were alternative dance singles that became moderate hits in the U.S. Hotwired sold more than 300,000 copies in its first six months of release.

The band supported the album by touring North America with Catherine Wheel; they later toured with Tom Tom Club and James. "Divine Thing" was used in the film Hellraiser III.

== Production ==
The album was produced by Marius De Vries, Sean Dickson, and Steve Sidelnyk. It was recorded in 1991 and 1992 at Livingston Studios and Advision Brighton. The Soup Dragons were more prepared for the sessions, having written 15+ songs before entering the studio. They band considered Hotwired to be an optimistic album; they also conceded that they still had not quite captured the power of their live sound on record.

== Critical reception ==
Professional ratings
Review scores
Source	Rating
AllMusic	3.5/5 stars
Calgary Herald	D
Chicago Tribune	3/4 stars
Los Angeles Times	2/4 stars

The Calgary Herald deemed the album "bubblegum music sonically gussied up for the '90s". The Los Angeles Times concluded that "the shuffling, dance-rock fusion on Hotwired works only occasionally, most imaginatively on 'Divine Thing'". The Washington Post wrote: "Combining contemporary dance beats and sound effects with gospel-style backing vocals and beat-group touches ... songs like 'Pleasure' mix and match '60s and '90s British youth culture".

The St. Petersburg Times stated that "the band limits guitar technique to power chords, wah-wah pedals and scuffled riffs, fattened up by studio wizardry and layered samples". The Chicago Tribune opined that the band "does little to pull distance from the retro sound pervasive among groups from across the big pond".

AllMusic described Hotwired as the album where the Soup Dragons reached "the happy medium between the slick breakbeats and guitar-based rock & roll," adding that the songs are "among the strongest of the band's career".

== Track listing ==
All songs written by Sean Dickson.

1. "Pleasure" – 3:54
2. "Divine Thing" – 3:51
3. "Running Wild" – 4:01
4. "Getting Down" – 4:11
5. "Forever Yesterday" – 4:49
6. "No More Understanding" – 4:58
7. "Dream-On (Solid Gone)" – 4:00
8. "Everlasting" – 3:43
9. "Absolute Heaven" – 3:20
10. "Everything" – 3:56
11. "Sweet Layabout" – 3:43
12. "Mindless" – 4:56

== Personnel ==
- Sean Dickson – vocals, guitar, keyboards
- Jim McCullough – backing vocals, guitar
- Sushil K. Dade – bass
- Paul Quinn – drums, percussion
