= In the Meantime (Spacehog song) =

1996 single by Spacehog

Single by Spacehog

from the album Resident Alien
- B-side: "To Be a Millionaire... Was It Likely?" (live); "Zeroes"
- Released: 20 February 1996
- Genre: Alternative rock; glam rock; Britpop
- Length: 4:58
- Label: Sire; Elektra
- Songwriter: Royston Langdon
- Producer: Bryce Goggin

Spacehog singles chronology
"In the Meantime" (1996)	"Cruel to Be Kind" (1996)

Music video
- "In the Meantime" on YouTube

"In the Meantime" is a song by English alternative rock band Spacehog from their debut album, Resident Alien (1995). It samples the Penguin Cafe Orchestra song "Telephone and Rubber Band". Released as the band's debut single in February 1996, it peaked atop the US Billboard Mainstream Rock Tracks chart and the UK Rock Singles Chart. It additionally reached number 32 on the Billboard Hot 100 and number 29 on the UK Singles Chart.

== Meaning ==
In a 2018 interview, lead singer Royston Langdon said:

It's me trying to reach people. It's using some kind of metaphor of a worldly or inner-worldly search for the end of isolation, and the acceptance of one's self is in there. At the end of the day it's saying whatever you gotta do, it's OK, it's alright. And I think that's also me talking to myself, getting through my wan anxieties and fear of death. That's what it all comes down to. What's so beautiful about it is that it continues to connect with people.

== Track listings ==
- US CD and cassette single
1. "In the Meantime" – 5:01
2. "To Be a Millionaire... Was It Likely?" (live) – 3:41
- Australian and European CD single
1. "In the Meantime" (edit) – 4:31
2. "Zeroes" – 6:38
3. "To Be a Millionaire... Was It Likely?" (live) – 3:35

== Charts ==
=== Weekly charts ===
Chart (1996–1997)	Peak position
Australia (ARIA)	40
Canada Top Singles (RPM)	33
Canada Rock/Alternative (RPM)	6
Europe (Eurochart Hot 100)	88
Iceland (Íslenski Listinn Topp 40)	26
New Zealand (Recorded Music NZ)	45
Scottish Singles Sales (Official Charts)	28
Sweden (Sverigetopplistan)	36
UK Singles (Official Charts)	29
UK Rock & Metal (Official Charts)	1
US Billboard Hot 100	32
US Alternative Airplay (Billboard)	2
US Mainstream Rock (Billboard)	1
US Pop Airplay (Billboard)	37

=== Year-end charts ===
Chart (1996)	Position
Canada Rock/Alternative (RPM)	38
US Mainstream Rock Tracks (Billboard)	4
US Modern Rock Tracks (Billboard)	8

== Release history ==
Region	Date	Format(s)	Label(s)	Ref.
United States	20 February 1996	Contemporary hit radio	Elektra	
United States	19 March 1996	CD	Elektra	
United Kingdom	29 April 1996	CD; cassette	Sire; Elektra	
United Kingdom (re-release)	16 December 1996	CD; cassette	Sire; Elektra	
