= Breakwater School =

Location
- 856 Brighton Avenue; Portland, Maine 04102; United States
- Coordinates: 43°40′22″N 70°18′51″W

Information
- Established: 1956; 70 years ago
- Website: school.breakwaterlearning.org

Breakwater School is an independent, non-denominational, co-educational school in Portland, Maine.

The school currently enrolls up to 180 students from toddler through eighth grade. The sixth through eighth grade program is experiential and integrative, consisting of a series of 6 to 7 week projects completed over the course of the school year.

Breakwater was founded as a day care center, named Playtime Haven, by Frank and El Costa in 1956 after their son recovered from a serious illness. As it grew, it moved to a series of different locations in South Portland and Cape Elizabeth, until 1982 when it purchased its current location in Portland. Since then, the school has also been given a 21-acre nature preserve in nearby Cumberland which it uses regularly for field trips as part of the school's Science curriculum.

The Executive Director is David Sullivan, previously a Teaching Principal at the Brooklin School in Brooklin, Maine, and the Academic Director is Maggie Lyon.
