= Rage Magazine =

Defunct Canadian urban lifestyle magazine

Rage Magazine was a free urban magazine and the first issue was released in mid-2004. The magazines print-run increased from 10,000 to 80,000 copies, and was found across Canada and the US. Rage was an edgy street magazine with the size format of 9×10", the magazines content was mainly on music and fashion. The magazine had a column by convicted cocaine smuggler, George Jung who Johnny Depp plays in the movie Blow. Melissa Auf der Maur also wrote articles on red heads. Max Dagg-Heston had 15 minutes a week to talk to Jung on the phone from prison where the calls were not recorded or listened into as it was from his probation office in prison, during this time they would talk over content details. Jung had a column of poetry in each issue. The magazine was free and driven by advertising and campaigns and at from 2006–2008 had the biggest circulation of a free magazine in North America, this because no other free magazines were releasing 80,000 free copies in each country, Canada and the United States. Nathan Munn was Editor-In-Chief.

== History ==
Rage Magazine was founded by Max Dagg-Heston (Maximizer), Nelson Dias, Kris Branch in 2004 in a loft of Max Dagg-Heston's; the magazine took off and went national within a year. New investors and publishers of The Scope tourist magazine, Sebastien Le Montagner and Sylvain Gelinas then bought into the company for $4,000,000. This led to a creative differences between all partners and Max Dagg-Heston tried to leave, but with no one to buy his shares he stayed with the company.

In 2008 shares from Nelson Dias, Sebastien Le Montagner and Sylvain Gelinas were bought by Dubai entrepreneur Fadi Ajjaoui, making Max Dagg-Heston and Ajjaoui the only shareholders. Later in 2009 the magazine was discontinued due to creative differences between the two remaining partners.

In March 2010 in an interview with Max D Heston with a McGill University student he stated, "It would be a shame to just kill the magazine, we had zero debt and it was going strong though just tough when you don't get on well with your partners. So we decided to drop it and move on. We may release some special editions of Rage one day if me and Fadi can bring ourselves around to talking to each other again." He also stated " I think the print business is done for now, I mean I will always love magazines though I think its time to move on to more fiction and films".

Rage Magazine released over one million free copies from 2006–2008.

In 2009 The Best Of Rage Magazine was released and sold for US$45.00 on the Rage website with a limited run of 30,000 copies for sale, featuring exclusive interviews with Bad Brains, Deftones, Stone Temple Pilots, Jeffrey Archer, Supergrass.

In 2009 Max Dagg-Heston left Rage to start Street Carnage Magazine with ex Vice magazine founder Gavin McInnes after he left the company.

In mid-2011 a smaller pocket book run of Rage Magazine was released for the festivals Osheaga and Coachella. Max Dagg-Heston quoted when asked, "You have to whore yourself out now and again, and this is the time to do so".

In 2011 it was announced that Ruckenstein Media would release the magazine changing its name and format slightly to Rage TV, none of the original founders will be part of this new venture.

In 2016 Rage was bought back by its original founder.

In 2017 Rage TV was re-launched which focuses on interviews, documentaries and films.

Rage Events was launched in 2026 focusing on mid to large scale concerts.

== Notable content ==
In 2017 for the relaunch of Rage, founder Max Dagg-Heston interviewed Liam Gallagher at Osheaga music festival. The interview touched upon on drugs and the legalization of marijuana in Canada and the United States.

== Reception ==
Issue 5 was nominated for Best Cover at the 2007 Grands Prix in Quebec.
