= Sick of Myself (song) =

1995 song by Matthew Sweet

Single by Matthew Sweet

from the album 100% Fun
- Released: 1995
- Recorded: 1994
- Genre: Alternative rock, power pop
- Label: Zoo Entertainment
- Songwriter: Matthew Sweet
- Producers: Brendan O'Brien; Matthew Sweet

Matthew Sweet singles chronology
| "We're the Same" (1995) | "Sick of Myself" (1995) | "Where You Get Love" (1997) |

"Sick of Myself" is a song by American singer-songwriter Matthew Sweet. It was released in 1995 by Zoo Entertainment, as a single from his fifth studio album, 100% Fun (1995). The song became Sweet's most commercially successful single and marked his strongest crossover from alternative radio to mainstream pop formats. It peaked at number 56 on the US Cash Box Top 100 and 58 on the Billboard Hot 100.

== Development and composition ==
"Sick of Myself" was recorded during the sessions for 100% Fun in 1994, with production handled by Brendan O'Brien and Sweet.

Musically, "Sick of Myself" features distorted electric guitars, a steady mid-tempo rhythm, and a conventional verse–chorus structure. Critics have described the song as blending power pop melodies with the louder guitar textures associated with alternative rock. The lyrics are written in the first person and focus on self-criticism and romantic frustration. Reviewers have frequently noted the contrast between the song's upbeat melodic feel and its emotionally negative lyrical content.

== Release and promotion ==
The song was released in 1995 by Zoo Entertainment. It was promoted to alternative, modern rock, and mainstream Top 40 radio formats in the United States. A music video was produced to support the single and received airplay on music television outlets.

== Reception ==
"Sick of Myself" received generally positive reviews from contemporary music critics. Reviews frequently highlighted the song's strong hook and accessibility while noting its darker tone compared with Sweet's earlier work. The single achieved significant commercial success in the United States. It peaked at number 56 on the US Cash Box Top 100 and number 58 on the Billboard Hot 100 chart, making it Sweet's highest-charting song. The song also performed strongly on radio airplay charts, reflecting its crossover appeal beyond alternative rock audiences.

== Legacy and impact ==
"Sick of Myself" is widely regarded as one of the defining songs of Matthew Sweet's career. Retrospective articles frequently cite the track as a highlight of 100% Fun. The song is often included in critical overviews of notable alternative rock releases from 1995. Its commercial success contributed to Sweet's broader recognition in the mainstream music industry during the 1990s.

== In popular culture ==
The song was covered by Bowling for Soup on their album Bowling for Soup Goes to the Movies. In 2005, indie rock band Death Cab for Cutie also performed a cover of the song for NPR's World Cafe. "Sick of Myself" appeared on an episode of Hindsight, as well as an episode of Your Friends & Neighbors.

== Charts ==
| Chart (1995) | Peak position |
|---|---|
| US Billboard Hot 100 | 58 |
| US Cash Box Top 100 | 56 |
