= The High Fidelity =

British rock band

- Origin: Bellshill, Lanarkshire, Scotland
- Genres: Alternative rock, dance-pop
- Years active: 1995–2001
- Members: Sean Dickson; Adrian Barry; Paul Dallaway; Ross McFarlane

The High Fidelity were a British rock band, formed in 1995 by Sean Dickson, formerly of the Soup Dragons.

== History ==
Dickson started the group when High Times magazine asked him to record a track for a cannabis-themed covers compilation album, Hempilation: Freedom Is NORML. Their debut album, Demonstration (2000). The LP was recorded largely in Dickson's bedroom, with Adrian Barry (bass), Paul Dallaway (guitar) and Ross McFarlane (drums). The album was later augmented with a number of orchestral arrangements recorded in India. Musically, the record comprised experimental dance-pop songs, and was described by The Guardian as "an expertly composed pastiche of psychedelic pop". Their single "Luv Dup" reached #70 on the UK Singles Chart in July 1998. The band recorded a number of sessions for John Peel's BBC Radio 1 show, introducing the use of the omnichord, a vintage synthesiser, with which they performed a number of songs including a version of "Silent Night". Peel shared the band's enthusiasm for the instrument, and when they gave him an omnichord as a 60th birthday present it led to Peel co-writing and performing on one of the tracks on the band's second album, 2001's The Omnichord Album. He co-wrote the track "Pig Might Fly" about his wife with Sean Dickson for the album.

== Discography ==
=== Albums ===
- Demonstration (1999)
- The Omnichord Album (2001)

=== Singles and EPs ===
- "Addicted to a TV" (1997)
- "Come Again" (1998)
- "2 Up / 2 Down" (1998)
- "Luv Dup" (1998)
- "Ithanku" (2000)
- "Scream If You Want to Go Faster" (2001)

=== Compilation appearances ===
- Hempilation: Freedom Is NORML - "Smokin' Cheeba Cheeba" (1995)
