= The Soup Dragons =

Scottish alternative rock band

- The Soup Dragons performing in 2025

Background information
- Origin: Bellshill, North Lanarkshire, Scotland
- Genres: Punk rock; pop; Madchester; Britpop
- Years active: 1985–1995; 2023–present
- Labels: The Subway Organization; Raw TV; Sire; Big Life; Mercury
- Members: Sean Dickson; Jim McCulloch; Ian Whitehall; Sushil K. Dade; Ross A. Sinclair; Paul Quinn

The Soup Dragons are a Scottish rock band of the late 1980s and early 1990s. Named after a character in the 1970s children's television series Clangers, the group is best known for its cover of the Rolling Stones' song "I'm Free", which was a number 5 hit in the United Kingdom in 1990, and for its release "Divine Thing", a top 40 hit in the United States in 1992.

== History ==
The Soup Dragons formed in Bellshill, North Lanarkshire, a town near Motherwell, Scotland, in 1985. The band members included Sean Dickson (vocals, lead guitar, and keyboards; born in 1966), Jim McCulloch (guitar, and secondary vocals) who replaced Ian Whitehall, and Sushil K. Dade (bass; born Sushil Kumar Dade, 1966, in Glasgow). The original drummer, Ross A. Sinclair (born 1966, in Bearsden, Glasgow) left the group in 1989, before their second album Lovegod, to pursue a career in art; he was replaced by Paul Quinn (born 9 August 1963). Most of the Soup Dragons' songs were written by Sean Dickson.

The Soup Dragons recorded their first demo tape,You Have Some Too, after playing a few local gigs. This was followed by a flexi disc single, "If You Were the Only Girl in the World". They signed to The Subway Organization in early 1986. Their first EP, The Sun in the Sky, was Buzzcocks-inspired pop punk. The band's breakthrough came with their second single for Subway, "Whole Wide World", which reached No. 2 on the UK Independent Chart in 1986. Dickson and McCulloch also played in BMX Bandits at this time.

The band were signed by former Wham! co-manager Jazz Summers' label Raw TV with further indie hits (and minor UK Singles Chart hits) following during 1987 and 1988. Over the course of six singles (the first three collected in 1986 on a US-only compilation, Hang Ten), they gradually developed a complex rock guitar sound, which culminated in their first album This Is Our Art, now signed to major label Sire Records. After one single from the album - "Kingdom Chairs" - was released, they then returned to original label Raw TV and Big Life Records.

In the year after This Is Our Art, the Soup Dragons' sound underwent a change from an indie rock sound, to the rock-dance crossover sound; this was mainly due to being without a drummer and buying a sampler and drum machine and experimenting with sound with the release of the album Lovegod. This change can be attributed to the rise of the ecstasy-fueled acid house rave scene in the UK.

In 1990, they released "I'm Free", their most successful hit single in the UK and an up-tempo cover of a Rolling Stones song with an added toasting overdub by reggae star Junior Reid, which reached No. 5. The single later appeared on the soundtrack for the film The World's End (2013).

Subsequent albums continued in the band's own style and in 1992, they enjoyed their biggest US hit with "Divine Thing", which reached No. 26 on the Billboard Hot 100. It also hit No. 3 on the Modern Rock chart and its video was nominated by MTV as one of the year's best, though beaten by Nirvana's "Smells Like Teen Spirit".

The Soup Dragons disbanded in 1995. Paul Quinn joined Teenage Fanclub, Sushil K. Dade formed the experimental post-rock group Future Pilot A.K.A., Sean Dickson formed the High Fidelity (and has since released many records and albums with other artists, including Bootsy Collins, Yoko Ono, Crystal Waters and David McAlmont). Jim McCulloch joined Superstar, wrote and recorded music with Isobel Campbell, and formed the folk group Snowgoose. Ross A. Sinclair had a successful career in the visual arts, winning a number of international awards and becoming a Research Fellow at Glasgow School of Art, although he also still makes music to this day.

The story of the Soup Dragons is included as part of the 2017 documentary Teenage Superstars.

The original Soup Dragons line-up played six reunion shows in the UK in October and November 2023, with musical guests the Vaselines, BMX Bandits and a DJ set from the Pastels.

The band features in the book Postcards from Scotland, detailing the 1980s and 1990s independent music scene in Scotland.

== Discography ==
=== Albums ===
List of albums, with selected chart positions
Title	Details	Peak chart positions				Certifications
Title	Details	UK	AUS	NZ	US	Certifications
This Is Our Art	Released: 1988; Format: LP, CD, cassette; Label: Sire	60	—	—	—	
Lovegod	Released: 1990; Format: LP, CD, cassette; Label: Big Life/Polygram	7	54	27	88	BPI: Silver
Hotwired	Released: 1992; Format: LP, CD, cassette; Label: Big Life/Mercury	74	177	—	97	
Hydrophonic	Released: 1994; Format: 2×LP, CD, cassette; Label: Raw TV/Mercury	—	—	—	—	
"—" denotes a recording that did not chart or was not released in that territory.

=== Compilations ===
- Hang Ten! (1987), Sire – compiles the tracks from the singles "Hang-Ten!", "Whole Wide World" and "Head Gone Astray"
- 20 Golden Greats (2012)

=== Extended plays ===
- The Sun Is in the Sky (1986)
- Hang Ten! (1986)

=== Singles ===
Title	Year	Peak chart positions										Album
Title	Year	UK	UK Indie	AUS	AUT	BEL (FL)	FRA	IRE	NLD	NZ	US	Album
"Whole Wide World"	1986	—	2	—	—	—	—	—	—	—	—	Hang-Ten!
"Hang-Ten"	1986	—	2	—	—	—	—	—	—	—	—	Hang-Ten!
"Head Gone Astray"	1987	82	3	—	—	—	—	—	—	—	—	Hang-Ten!
"Can't Take No More"	1987	65	1	—	—	—	—	—	—	—	—	This Is Our Art
"Soft as Your Face"	1987	66	2	—	—	—	—	—	—	—	—	This Is Our Art
"The Majestic Head"	1988	77	4	—	—	—	—	—	—	—	—	This Is Our Art
"Kingdom Chairs"	1988	82	—	—	—	—	—	—	—	—	—	This Is Our Art
"Backwards Dog"	1989	—	5	—	—	—	—	—	—	—	—	Lovegod
"Crotch Deep Trash"	1989	—	6	—	—	—	—	—	—	—	—	Lovegod
"Mother Universe"	1990	94	4	—	—	—	—	—	—	—	—	Lovegod
"I'm Free"	1990	5	2	9	26	38	33	15	52	6	79	Lovegod
"Mother Universe" (remixed version)	1990	26	—	67	—	—	—	—	—	45	—	Lovegod
"Electric Blues"	1991	—	—	—	—	—	—	—	—	—	—	Non-album single
"Divine Thing"	1992	53	—	133	—	—	—	—	—	—	35	Hotwired
"Pleasure"	1992	77	—	—	—	—	—	—	—	—	69	Hotwired
"One Way Street"	1994	—	—	—	—	—	—	—	—	—	—	Hydrophonic
"Janice Long Session 01.09.86"	2022	—	—	—	—	—	—	—	—	—	—	Non-album singles
"John Peel Session 06.02.87"	2022	—	—	—	—	—	—	—	—	—	—	Non-album singles
"Janice Long Session 30.08.87"	2023	—	—	—	—	—	—	—	—	—	—	Non-album singles
"John Peel Session 24.02.86"	2023	—	—	—	—	—	—	—	—	—	—	Non-album singles
"Love Is Love"	2023	—	—	—	—	—	—	—	—	—	—	Non-album singles
"—" denotes a recording that did not chart or was not released in that territory.
