= The Rolling Stones in Mono =

Box set by The Rolling Stones
- Released: 30 September 2016
- Recorded: 1963–1969
- Studio: Various
- Genres: Rock; pop; blues
- Length: 597:13
- Label: ABKCO
- Producer: Teri Landi

The Rolling Stones chronology
Totally Stripped (2016)	The Rolling Stones in Mono (2016)	Blue & Lonesome (2016)

Professional ratings
Review scores
Source	Rating
AllMusic	4.5/5 stars
Louder than Sound	4.5/5 stars
Analog Planet	(no rating)

The Rolling Stones in Mono is a box set by the English rock band the Rolling Stones, released by ABKCO Records in September 2016. It contains most of the group's British and American studio albums and other recordings from the 1960s in mono format, on fifteen compact discs or sixteen vinyl records. All tracks were remastered using the Direct Stream Digital process by Bob Ludwig. The original recordings were produced by Andrew Loog Oldham, Jimmy Miller and the Rolling Stones.

== Content ==
The Rolling Stones in Mono omits the American versions of the band's debut album and of Between the Buttons; the former as there is only a difference of one track between the two, and the latter as it replaces two tracks with the 1967 single "Let's Spend the Night Together" backed with "Ruby Tuesday", both of which also appear on the compilation Flowers included here. Their Satanic Majesties Request, Beggars Banquet and Let It Bleed were issued with identical track listings in each country. The last two are not dedicated mono mixes, as none were made, but are the stereo mixes folded-down into mono. Albums included in this box set are listed below. The box also includes all tracks released on the band's two studio EPs, The Rolling Stones and Five by Five.

A compilation unique to this set, Stray Cats, comprises 24 tracks issued by the Stones in the 1960s that did not appear on the albums listed. Most were issued on singles. Two appeared on a 1964 Decca Records compilation of items from roster artists, Saturday Club; three tracks were on the band's first EP; although issued on the US live album Got Live If You Want It!, their version of "I've Been Loving You Too Long" is a studio recording with audience sounds added later. There is also the Italian language version of "As Tears Go By" issued in Italy and the dedicated mono mix of "Street Fighting Man" released as a single in the United States. Stray Cats also contains both covers of "Poison Ivy": one appearing on a Decca promotional album; the second on the band's first EP.

== Albums ==
1. The Rolling Stones (UK, 1964)
2. 12 × 5 (US, 1964)
3. The Rolling Stones No. 2 (UK, 1965)
4. The Rolling Stones, Now! (US, 1965)
5. Out of Our Heads (US, 1965)
6. Out of Our Heads (UK, 1965)
7. December's Children (And Everybody's) (US, 1965)
8. Aftermath (UK, 1966)
9. Aftermath (US, 1966)
10. Between the Buttons (UK, 1967)
11. Flowers (US, 1967)
12. Their Satanic Majesties Request (1967)
13. Beggars Banquet (1968)
14. Let It Bleed (1969)
15. Stray Cats (2016)

== Stray Cats track listing ==
Catalogue numbers from Decca Records and London Records; chart positions from UK Singles Chart, Billboard Hot 100, and Billboard 200.

No.	Title	Writer(s)	Length
1.	"Come On" (Decca F11675A UK No. 21 6 July 1963)	Chuck Berry	1:48
2.	"I Want to Be Loved" (Decca F11675b 6 July 1963)	Willie Dixon	1:52
3.	"I Wanna Be Your Man" (Decca F11674A UK No. 12 1 November 1963)	John Lennon, Paul McCartney	1:43
4.	"Stoned" (Decca F11674b 1 November 1963)	Nanker Phelge	2:09
5.	"Fortune Teller" (Saturday Club Decca LK 4583 January 25, 1964)	Naomi Neville	2:17
6.	"Poison Ivy" (Saturday Club Decca LK 4583 January 25, 1964)	Jerry Leiber, Mike Stoller	2:34
7.	"Bye Bye Johnny" (The Rolling Stones Decca DFE 8560 UK No. 1)	Berry	2:09
8.	"Money" (The Rolling Stones Decca DFE 8560 UK No. 1)	Janie Bradford, Berry Gordy	2:31
9.	"Poison Ivy" (The Rolling Stones Decca DFE 8560 UK No. 1)	Leiber, Stoller	2:06
10.	"Not Fade Away" (Decca F11845A UK No. 3 US No. 48 February 21, 1964)	Buddy Holly, Norman Petty	1:47
11.	"I've Been Loving You Too Long" (Got Live If You Want It! London LL 3493 US No. 6)	Otis Redding, Jerry Butler	2:54
12.	"The Under Assistant West Coast Promotion Man" (London F12220b 6 May 1965)	Nanker Phelge	3:20
13.	"19th Nervous Breakdown" (Decca F12331A UK No. 2 US No. 2 2 April 1966)	Mick Jagger, Keith Richards	3:56
14.	"Sad Day" (London 9823b 2 December 1966)	Jagger, Richards	3:01
15.	"Con Le Mie Lacrime" (Decca F22270A April 1966)	Jagger, Richards, Andrew Loog Oldham	2:48
16.	"Long, Long While" (Decca F12395b 13 May 1966)	Jagger, Richards	3:01
17.	"Who's Driving Your Plane?" (Decca F12497b 23 September 1966)	Jagger, Richards	3:14
18.	"We Love You" (Decca F12654A UK No. 8 US No. 50 August 18, 1967)	Jagger, Richards	4:36
19.	"Dandelion" (Decca F12654b UK No. 8 US No. 14 August 18, 1967)	Jagger, Richards	3:48
20.	"Child of the Moon" (Decca F12782b 24 May 1968)	Jagger, Richards	3:12
21.	"Jumpin' Jack Flash" (Decca F12782A UK#1 US No. 3 May 24, 1968)	Jagger, Richards	3:38
22.	"Street Fighting Man" (London 909A US No. 48 August 1968)	Jagger, Richards	2:41
23.	"Honky Tonk Women" (Decca F12952A UK No. 1 US No. 1 7 April 1969)	Jagger, Richards	3:00
24.	"You Can't Always Get What You Want" (Decca F12952b 7 April 1969)	Jagger, Richards	4:49

== Stray Cats personnel ==
Stray Cats compilation only; see individual albums for full personnel credits.

=== The Rolling Stones ===
- Mick Jagger – vocals; harmonica; percussion; various instruments
- Keith Richards – guitars; bass; piano; vocals
- Brian Jones – guitars; harmonica; keyboards; woodwinds; percussion; various instruments; backing vocals
- Bill Wyman – bass; keyboards; percussion; vocals
- Charlie Watts – drums; percussion; backing vocals

=== Additional personnel ===
- Ian Stewart – piano; organ
- Mick Taylor – guitar
- Jack Nitzsche – piano
- Nicky Hopkins – piano; harpsichord; organ
- John Lennon, Paul McCartney – backing vocals
- Jimmy Miller – backing vocals; percussion; drums
- Dave Mason – shehnai; bass drum
- Steve Gregory; Bud Beadle – saxophones
- Reparata and the Delrons – background vocals
- Nanette Newman; Doris Troy – background vocals
- Al Kooper – piano; organ; French horn
- Rocky Dijon – percussion
- London Bach Choir – choir

== Charts ==
2023 chart performance for The Rolling Stones in Mono
Chart (2023)	Peak position
German Albums (Offizielle Top 100)	15
Swiss Albums (Schweizer Hitparade)	33
US Billboard 200	151
US Top Rock Albums (Billboard)	22
