= Miss Amanda Jones =

Song by the Rolling Stones

from the album Between the Buttons
- Released: 20 January 1967
- Recorded: 3–7 August and 9 November – 6 December 1966
- Studio: RCA Studios, Hollywood; Olympic Sound Studios, London
- Genre: Rock and roll
- Length: 2:48
- Label: Decca/ABKCO (UK); London/ABKCO (US)
- Songwriter: Jagger-Richard
- Producer: Andrew Loog Oldham

Between the Buttons track listing
- 12 tracks Side one: 1. "Yesterday's Papers"; 2. "My Obsession"; 3. "Back Street Girl"; 4. "Connection"; 5. "She Smiled Sweetly"; 6. "Cool, Calm & Collected"; Side two: 7. "All Sold Out"; 8. "Please Go Home"; 9. "Who's Been Sleeping Here?"; 10. "Complicated"; 11. "Miss Amanda Jones"; 12. "Something Happened to Me Yesterday"

"Miss Amanda Jones" is a song by the English rock band the Rolling Stones, featured on their 1967 album Between the Buttons. Written by Mick Jagger and Keith Richards, the track stands out as a return to their raw rock and roll sound on an album that otherwise heavily experimented with baroque pop and psychedelia. It is widely believed that the lyrics were inspired by Amanda Lear, a prominent figure in the London social scene at the time.

== Inspiration ==
The song was inspired by Amanda Lear, a French singer and model, who was a friend of Brian Jones. Philippe Margotin and Jean-Michael Guesdon in their book The Rolling Stones: All the Songs state that they consider the song to be the prototype for the early seventies sound of the Rolling Stones, with the combination of Jagger's and Richard's voices and the "rhythm riff".

== Tributes ==
The character Amanda Jones, played by Lea Thompson in the 1987 film Some Kind of Wonderful was named after this song. Other characters in the film were named in honor of the Rolling Stones, such as Keith (played by Eric Stoltz) and Watts (played by Mary Stuart Masterson). The film features a then-current cover of the song recorded by The March Violets, which Ira Robbins describes as "amazingly catchy".

== Reception ==
Billboard described the song along with "Cool, Calm and Collected" as "outstanding", and part of the "winning package". Tim Dowly in his 1983 book The Rolling Stones described the song as a "fast rocker".

== Personnel ==
The Rolling Stones

- Mick Jagger – lead vocals
- Keith Richards – lead guitar, fuzz guitar, backing vocals
- Bill Wyman – bass guitar
- Charlie Watts – drums

Additional musicians

- Ian Stewart – piano, organ

== Covers ==
The song was covered by The Corpse Grinders for their 1984 album Valley of Fear. The March Violets recorded it for their 1987 album Some Kind of Wonderful. The A-Bones recorded a single of the song in 2004.
