= Forty Licks =

Greatest hits album by the Rolling Stones
- Released: 30 September 2002
- Recorded: 10 January 1964 – 7 June 2002
- Genre: Rock
- Length: 155:52
- Labels: Virgin; ABKCO; Decca
- Producers: Andrew Loog Oldham; The Rolling Stones; Jimmy Miller; Chris Kimsey; Don Was; Dust Brothers

The Rolling Stones chronology
No Security (1998)	Forty Licks (2002)	Live Licks (2004)

Singles from Forty Licks
- 1. "Don't Stop" Released: 30 September 2002

Professional ratings
Review scores
Source	Rating
AllMusic	5/5 stars
Entertainment Weekly	A−
Rolling Stone	5/5 stars
Stylus	A+
Encyclopedia of Popular Music	5/5 stars

Forty Licks is a double compilation album by the Rolling Stones. A 40-year career-spanning retrospective, Forty Licks is notable for being the first retrospective to combine their formative Decca/London era of the 1960s, now licensed by ABKCO Records (on disc one), with their self-owned post-1970 material, distributed at the time by Virgin/EMI but now distributed by ABKCO's own distributor Universal Music Group (on mostly disc two). Four new songs are included on the second disc. The album was a commercial success, as it reached No. 2 on both UK and US charts. Concurrently with the album's release, the Stones embarked on the successful, year-long international Licks Tour, which would result in the subsequent Live Licks album being released in 2004.

== Background ==
In 1970, the Rolling Stones had an acrimonious break-up with their former manager, Allen Klein, and their former record label, Decca Records (who licensed their recordings to London Records for release in the US). Because of the terms of their former contract, all of their pre-1970 recordings were under Klein's control, up to and including Let It Bleed, some tracks that made it on Sticky Fingers and Exile on Main St., as well as outtakes, unreleased recordings, and live recordings. The Stones would immediately form Rolling Stones Records as a result, that gave them control over all of their subsequent recordings. As a result, any career retrospectives tended to be divided into two eras: prior to the split, and after the split. Klein's ABKCO Records and Decca Records would continue to release unauthorized greatest-hits records, outtakes and rarities records, and other compilations throughout the 1970s, 1980s, and 1990s. Any compilations or retrospectives released by the Rolling Stones after 1970, by any of their distributors or partners (such as Atlantic Records or Virgin Records) were always restricted to material recorded and released from 1971 onward. Because of various business deals and mergers of various record companies over time, the barriers to creating a unified retrospective compilation album had been resolved by the early 2000s. For the release of Forty Licks, the band recorded 4 new songs in the studio, which are included on disc 2: "Don't Stop", "Keys to Your Love", "Stealing My Heart" and "Losin’ My Touch".

== Critical reception ==
Forty Licks has received mostly positive reviews from music critics. AllMusic's Stephen Thomas Erlewine felt that Forty Licks was similar to ELV1S: 30 #1 Hits because both were influenced by the Beatles' 1, but that Forty Licks had a better concept than ELV1S. Although Rob Brunner's review of the album for Entertainment Weekly was favorable, he felt that the album was not needed because most of the band's fans already own all of the notable songs on the album. Darryl Sterdan of Jam! CANOE also felt that most fans already owned most of the songs on the album and that "Losing My Touch" was the only good previously unreleased song on the collection. Rob Sheffield of Rolling Stone felt that there were several songs missing from the album, but that the compilation was exciting and the four new songs were much better than their other recent work. Stylus magazine's Colin McElligatt felt that the band needed an "all-inclusive" collection, but the collection will not please everyone.

== Track listing ==
All tracks are written by Mick Jagger and Keith Richards, except where noted.

Disc one
No.	Title	Writer(s)	Album (Date)	Length
1.	"Street Fighting Man"		Beggars Banquet (1968)	3:15
2.	"Gimme Shelter"		Let It Bleed (1969)	4:31
3.	"(I Can't Get No) Satisfaction"		Out of Our Heads (1965)	3:43
4.	"The Last Time"		Out of Our Heads (1965)	3:41
5.	"Jumpin' Jack Flash"		non-album single (1968)	3:42
6.	"You Can't Always Get What You Want"		Let It Bleed (1969)	7:28
7.	"19th Nervous Breakdown"		non-album single (1966)	3:56
8.	"Under My Thumb"		Aftermath (1966)	3:41
9.	"Not Fade Away"	Buddy Holly; Norman Petty	England's Newest Hit Makers (1964)	1:48
10.	"Have You Seen Your Mother, Baby, Standing in the Shadow?"		non-album single (1966)	2:36
11.	"Sympathy for the Devil"		Beggars Banquet (1968)	6:17
12.	"Mother's Little Helper"		Aftermath (1966)	2:46
13.	"She's a Rainbow" (radio edit)		Their Satanic Majesties Request (1967)	4:13
14.	"Get Off of My Cloud"		December's Children (And Everybody's) (1965)	2:55
15.	"Wild Horses"		Sticky Fingers (1971)	5:43
16.	"Ruby Tuesday"		Between the Buttons (1967)	3:13
17.	"Paint It Black"		Aftermath (1966)	3:44
18.	"Honky Tonk Women"		non-album single (1969)	3:00
19.	"It's All Over Now"	Bobby Womack; Shirley Jean Womack	12 × 5 (1964)	3:26
20.	"Let's Spend the Night Together"		Between the Buttons (1967)	3:26

Disc two
No.	Title	Writer(s)	Album	Length
1.	"Start Me Up"		Tattoo You (1981)	3:33
2.	"Brown Sugar"		Sticky Fingers (1971)	3:50
3.	"Miss You" (7" remix edit)		Some Girls (1978)	3:35
4.	"Beast of Burden" (single edit)		Some Girls (1978)	3:28
5.	"Don't Stop"		new track (2002)	3:59
6.	"Happy"		Exile on Main St. (1972)	3:05
7.	"Angie"		Goats Head Soup (1973)	4:32
8.	"You Got Me Rocking"		Voodoo Lounge (1994)	3:34
9.	"Shattered"		Some Girls (1978)	3:46
10.	"Fool to Cry" (radio edit)		Black and Blue (1976)	4:07
11.	"Love Is Strong"		Voodoo Lounge (1994)	3:48
12.	"Mixed Emotions" (radio edit)		Steel Wheels (1989)	4:01
13.	"Keys to Your Love"		new track (2002)	4:11
14.	"Anybody Seen My Baby?"	Mick Jagger; Keith Richards; k.d. lang; Ben Mink	Bridges to Babylon (1997)	4:08
15.	"Stealing My Heart"		new track (2002)	3:42
16.	"Tumbling Dice"		Exile on Main St. (1972)	3:47
17.	"Undercover of the Night"		Undercover (1983)	4:13
18.	"Emotional Rescue" (radio edit)		Emotional Rescue (1980)	3:41
19.	"It's Only Rock 'n Roll (But I Like It)" (radio edit)		It's Only Rock 'n Roll (1974)	4:09
20.	"Losing My Touch"		new track (2002)	5:06

== Personnel ==
The Rolling Stones

- Mick Jagger – lead vocals, harmonica, percussion, guitar, electric piano
- Brian Jones – guitars (lead, slide and rhythm), mellotron, tambura, marimba, harmonica, backing vocals, recorder, piano, sitar (on all disc one tracks except "Gimme Shelter", "You Can't Always Get What You Want", "Wild Horses" and "Honky Tonk Women")
- Keith Richards – guitars (lead, slide, rhythm, acoustic and bass), backing vocals, piano, bowed double bass, lead vocals on "Happy" and "Losing My Touch"
- Mick Taylor – guitars (lead, slide, rhythm and bass) (on "Wild Horses", "Honky Tonk Women", "Brown Sugar", "Angie", "Tumbling Dice", and "It's Only Rock 'n Roll (But I Like It)")
- Charlie Watts – drums, percussion (except on "You Can't Always Get What You Want" and "Happy"), backing vocals
- Ronnie Wood – guitars (lead, slide, rhythm, acoustic, and pedal steel), backing vocals, bass drum, bass guitar (on all disc two tracks except "Brown Sugar", "Happy", "Angie", "Fool to Cry" and "Tumbling Dice")
- Bill Wyman – bass guitar, organ, maracas, bowed double bass, backing vocals (except on "Street Fighting Man", "Let's Spend the Night Together", "Don't Stop", "Happy", "You Got Me Rocking", "Shattered", "Love Is Strong", "Keys to Your Love", "Anybody Seen My Baby?", "Stealing My Heart", "Tumbling Dice" and "Losing My Touch")

Additional musicians

- Bud Beadle – saxophone on "Honky Tonk Women"
- Madeline Bell – backing vocals on "You Can't Always Get What You Want"
- Sugar Blue – harmonica on "Miss You"
- Paul Buckmaster – string arrangements on "Happy"
- Blondie Chaplin – backing vocals, shaker and tambourine on "Anybody Seen My Baby?", "Don't Stop", "Keys to Your Love", "Stealing My Heart" and "Losing My Touch"
- Moustapha Cisse – percussion on "Undercover of the Night"
- Merry Clayton – vocals on "Gimme Shelter"
- Mel Collins – saxophone on "Miss You"
- Brahms Coundoul – percussion on "Undercover of the Night"
- Sarah Dash – backing vocals on "Mixed Emotions"
- Jim Dickinson – piano on "Wild Horses"
- Rocky Dijon – percussion and congas on "You Can't Always Get What You Want" and "Sympathy for the Devil"
- Martin Ditcham – percussion on "Undercover of the Night"
- Sly Dunbar – percussion on "Undercover of the Night"
- Marianne Faithfull – backing vocals on "Sympathy for the Devil"
- Venetta Fields – backing vocals on "Tumbling Dice"
- Lisa Fischer – backing vocals on "Mixed Emotions"
- Bernard Fowler – backing vocals on "Love Is Strong"
- Steve Gregory – saxophone on "Honky Tonk Women"
- Nicky Harrison – string arrangement on "Angie"
- Nicky Hopkins – acoustic piano, electric piano, synthesized strings and backing vocals on "Street Fighting Man", "Gimme Shelter", "Sympathy for the Devil", "She's a Rainbow", "Happy", "Fool to Cry" and "Tumbling Dice"
- Kick Horns – brass on "Mixed Emotions"
- Luis Jardim – percussion on "Mixed Emotions"
- Darryl Jones – bass guitar on "Don't Stop", "You Got Me Rocking", "Love Is Strong", "Keys to Your Love", "Stealing My Heart" and "Losing My Touch"
- John Paul Jones – string arrangement on "She's a Rainbow"
- Bobby Keys – saxophone, percussion and maracas on "Brown Sugar", "Happy" and "Tumbling Dice"
- Clydie King – backing vocals on "Tumbling Dice"
- Al Kooper – piano, French horn and organ on "You Can't Always Get What You Want"
- Chuck Leavell – piano, organ and keyboards on "Don't Stop" and "Mixed Emotions"
- The London Bach Choir – choir on "You Can't Always Get What You Want"
- Dave Mason – shenai on "Street Fighting Man"
- Ian McLagan – electric piano on "Miss You"
- Jimmy Miller – percussion, drums, cowbell and backing vocals on "Gimme Shelter", "Jumpin' Jack Flash", "You Can't Always Get What You Want", "Honky Tonk Women", "Happy" and "Tumbling Dice"
- Jamie Muhoberac – bass guitar and keyboards on "Anybody Seen My Baby?"
- Ivan Neville – backing vocals on "Love Is Strong"
- Nanette Workman – backing vocals on "You Can't Always Get What You Want" and "Honky Tonk Women"
- Jack Nitzsche – piano, tambourine, choral arrangements and Nitzsche-Phone on "(I Can't Get No) Satisfaction", "You Can't Always Get What You Want", "Have You Seen Your Mother, Baby, Standing in the Shadow?", "Mother's Little Helper", "Ruby Tuesday" and "Let's Spend the Night Together"
- Denis O'Regan – photography
- Anita Pallenberg – backing vocals on "Sympathy for the Devil"
- Wayne Perkins – guitar on "Fool to Cry"
- Jim Price – trumpet and trombone on "Happy" and "Tumbling Dice"
- Reparata and the Delrons – backing vocals on "Honky Tonk Women"
- Ian Stewart – piano on "Jumpin' Jack Flash", "Honky Tonk Women", "Brown Sugar" and "Emotional Rescue"
- Doris Troy – backing vocals on "You Can't Always Get What You Want" and "Honky Tonk Women"
- Waddy Wachtel – electric and acoustic guitar on "Anybody Seen My Baby?"
- Don Was – keyboards on "Anybody Seen My Baby?"

== Charts ==
=== Weekly charts ===
Weekly chart performance for Forty Licks
Chart (2002–2003)	Peak position
Australian Albums (ARIA)	3
Austrian Albums (Ö3 Austria)	3
Belgian Albums (Ultratop Flanders)	1
Belgian Albums (Ultratop Wallonia)	1
Canadian Albums (Billboard)	2
Danish Albums (Hitlisten)	2
Dutch Albums (Album Top 100)	2
Finnish Albums (Suomen virallinen lista)	8
French Compilations Albums	1
German Albums (Offizielle Top 100)	2
Greek Albums (IFPI)	1
Hungarian Albums (MAHASZ)	26
Irish Albums (IRMA)	1
Italian Albums (FIMI)	1
New Zealand Albums (RMNZ)	1
Norwegian Albums (VG-lista)	2
Portuguese Albums (AFP)	13
Polish Albums (OLiS)	16
Scottish Albums (Official Charts)	2
Swedish Albums (Sverigetopplistan)	2
Swiss Albums (Schweizer Hitparade)	2
UK Albums (Official Charts)	2
US Billboard 200	2

=== Year-end charts ===
2002 year-end chart performance for Forty Licks
Chart (2002)	Position
Australian Albums (ARIA)	38
Austrian Albums (Ö3 Austria)	25
Belgian Albums (Ultratop Flanders)	11
Belgian Albums (Ultratop Wallonia)	32
Canadian Albums (Nielsen SoundScan)	15
Dutch Albums (Album Top 100)	28
German Albums (Offizielle Top 100)	20
New Zealand Albums (RMNZ)	40
Swedish Albums (Sverigetopplistan)	31
Swiss Albums (Schweizer Hitparade)	20
UK Albums (OCC)	19
US Billboard 200	79
Worldwide Albums (IFPI)	13

2003 year-end chart performance for Forty Licks
Chart (2003)	Position
Australian Albums (ARIA)	69
Dutch Albums (Album Top 100)	20
German Albums (Offizielle Top 100)	88
UK Albums (OCC)	101
US Billboard 200	56

2006 year-end chart performance for Forty Licks
Chart (2006)	Position
UK Albums (OCC)	106

2024 year-end chart performance for Forty Licks
Chart (2024)	Position
UK Albums (OCC)	82

2025 year-end chart performance for Forty Licks
Chart (2025)	Position
UK Albums (OCC)	90

== Certifications ==
Certifications and sales for Forty Licks
Region	Certification	Certified units/sales
Argentina (CAPIF)	Platinum	40,000^{^}
Australia (ARIA)	2× Platinum	140,000^{‡}
Austria (IFPI Austria)	Platinum	30,000^{*}
Belgium (BRMA)	Platinum	50,000^{*}
Brazil (Pro-Música Brasil)	Gold	50,000^{*}
Canada (Music Canada)	5× Platinum	500,000^{^}
Denmark (IFPI Danmark)	Platinum	50,000^{^}
Finland (Musiikkituottajat)	Gold	17,382
France (SNEP)	Platinum	300,000^{*}
Germany (BVMI)	Platinum	300,000^{^}
Greece (IFPI Greece)	Gold	15,000^{^}
Japan (RIAJ)	Platinum	200,000^{^}
Netherlands (NVPI)	Platinum	80,000^{^}
New Zealand (RMNZ)	2× Platinum	30,000^{^}
Norway	—	50,000
Spain (Promusicae)	Platinum	100,000^{^}
Sweden (GLF)	Gold	30,000^{^}
Switzerland (IFPI Switzerland)	Platinum	40,000^{^}
United Kingdom (BPI)	4× Platinum	1,200,000^{‡}
United States (RIAA)	4× Platinum	2,480,000
Summaries
Europe (IFPI)	Platinum	1,000,000^{*}
Worldwide	—	7,000,000
^{*} Sales figures based on certification alone.^{^} Shipments figures based on certification alone.^{‡} Sales+streaming figures based on certification alone.
