= Through the Past, Darkly (Big Hits Vol. 2) =

Greatest hits album by the Rolling Stones
- Released: 12 September 1969
- Recorded: 8 August 1963 – June 1969
- Genres: Rock; psychedelia
- Length: 42:30
- Language: English
- Labels: London (US), Decca (UK)
- Producers: Andrew Loog Oldham, The Rolling Stones, Jimmy Miller

The Rolling Stones chronology
Beggars Banquet (1968)	Through the Past, Darkly (Big Hits Vol. 2) (1969)	Let It Bleed (1969)

Through the Past, Darkly (Big Hits Vol. 2) is the third compilation album by the English rock band the Rolling Stones, released in September 1969 by Decca Records in the UK and London Records/ABKCO Records in the US.

== Background ==
According to Bruce Eder of AllMusic, the album resulted from "three coinciding events – the need to acknowledge the death of the band’s founder Brian Jones (whose epitaph graces the inside cover) in July 1969; the need to get 'Honky Tonk Women,' then a huge hit single, onto an LP; and to fill the ten-month gap since the release of Beggars Banquet and get an album with built-in appeal into stores ahead of the Stones' first American tour in three years."

== Songs ==
Because the Stones' first Big Hits compilation had been released in separate formats, with the Aftermath-era material appearing only on its UK edition, the American edition of Big Hits Vol. 2 included hit singles from the Aftermath period.

The British track listing included the more obscure "You Better Move On", from The Rolling Stones' self-titled 1964 debut EP and "Sittin' on a Fence", an Aftermath outtake originally released in 1967 on the US-compiled Flowers album. In addition to those songs, many tracks, notably single-only releases, were collected for the first time on a UK Rolling Stones album: "Let's Spend the Night Together", "Ruby Tuesday", "We Love You", "Dandelion", and "Honky Tonk Women".

== Title and packaging ==
The name of the album is a play on a line from the KJV translation of 1 Corinthians 13: "For now we see through a glass, darkly, but then face to face..."

The LP was packaged in an eight-sided die-cut gatefold sleeve, featuring an epitaph for Jones: "When this you see, remember me and bear me in your mind. Let all the world say what they may, speak of me as you find." Album cover design by John Kosh brings the viewer face to face with the five band members, through a glass.

== Release ==
Released on 12 September 1969, both versions of Through the Past, Darkly (Big Hits Vol. 2) proved to be popular releases, reaching No. 2 in the UK and US with enduring sales.

In August 2002 the US edition of Through the Past, Darkly (Big Hits Vol. 2) was reissued in a new remastered CD and SACD digipak by ABKCO Records.

The British version was again made available to the public as part of a limited edition vinyl box set, titled The Rolling Stones 1964–1969, in November 2010. It was also re-released digitally at the same time.

It was released in 2011 by Universal Music Enterprises in a Japanese only SHM-SACD version. For Record Store Day 2019 ABKCO Records released the record on orange vinyl, with a gatefold cover in the octagonal-shape of the original issue.

== Critical reception ==
Retrospective professional ratings
Review scores
Source	Rating
AllMusic	4.5/5 stars
The Encyclopedia of Popular Music	4/5 stars
Tom Hull	A−

Reviewing for Rolling Stone in September 1969, Greil Marcus hailed Through the Past, Darkly's American edition as "an album of tremendous impact" and "one of the great party records", with all the songs fan-favorites and "loud, tough, flashy rock and roll". However, he lamented the absence of singles and early songs of the Stones that had not yet appeared on any US album, as well as the aspect of repetition in the song selection. Robert Christgau echoed this disappointment in The Village Voice: "Some are repeated for a third time ('Ruby Tuesday,' 'Let's Spend the Night Together') while great B sides ('We Love You,' 'Who's Driving My Plane?,' 'Child of the Moon,' and 'You Can't Always Get What You Want,' which exists in a nine-minute version) remain uncollected. And whose fault is that?" More receptive was Rob Sheffield, who wrote years later in The New Rolling Stone Album Guide (2004) that the compilation had adequately summarised the Stones' "brief but tasty" psychedelic music period.

== Track listing ==
=== UK edition ===
All tracks written by Mick Jagger and Keith Richards, except where noted.

Side one

1. "Jumpin' Jack Flash" – 3:40
  - Originally released as a single in May 1968
2. "Mother's Little Helper" – 2:45
3. "2000 Light Years from Home" – 4:45
4. "Let's Spend the Night Together" – 3:36
  - Originally released as a single in January 1967
5. "You Better Move On" (Arthur Alexander) – 2:39
  - Originally released on the 1964 EP The Rolling Stones
6. "We Love You" – 4:22
  - Edited version; originally released as a single in August 1967

Side two

1. "Street Fighting Man" – 3:15
2. "She's a Rainbow" – 4:11
3. "Ruby Tuesday" – 3:16
  - Originally released as a single in January 1967
4. "Dandelion" – 3:32
  - Edited version; Originally released as a single in August 1967
5. "Sittin' on a Fence" – 3:02
  - Originally released on the American compilation Flowers in July 1967
6. "Honky Tonk Women" – 3:00
  - Originally released as a single in July 1969

=== US edition ===
All tracks written by Mick Jagger and Keith Richards.

Side one

1. "Paint It Black" – 3:20 (from Aftermath)
2. "Ruby Tuesday" – 3:12 (from Between the Buttons)
3. "She's a Rainbow" – 4:35 (from Their Satanic Majesties Request)
4. "Jumpin' Jack Flash" – 3:40 (from London single 908)
5. "Mother's Little Helper" – 2:40 (from Flowers)
6. "Let's Spend the Night Together" – 3:29 (from Between the Buttons)

Side two

1. "Honky Tonk Women" – 3:03 (from London single 910)
2. "Dandelion" – 3:56 (from London single 905)
3. "2000 Light Years from Home" – 4:45 (from Their Satanic Majesties Request)
4. "Have You Seen Your Mother, Baby, Standing in the Shadow?" – 2:33 (from Flowers)
5. "Street Fighting Man" – 3:10 (from Beggars Banquet)

== Personnel ==
The Rolling Stones

- Mick Jagger – lead vocals, percussion, harmonica
- Brian Jones – guitar, harmonica, sitar, piano, tambura, Mellotron, recorder, organ, backing vocals
- Keith Richards – guitar, backing vocals, bass guitar, double bass, piano, bass tom-tom
- Mick Taylor – guitar on "Honky Tonk Women"
- Bill Wyman – bass guitar, organ, double bass, backing vocals
- Charlie Watts – drums, percussion

Additional musicians

- Bud Beadle – saxophone on "Honky Tonk Women"
- Madeline Bell – backing vocals on "Honky Tonk Women"
- Rocky Dijon – maracas on "Jumpin' Jack Flash"
- Steve Gregory – saxophone on "Honky Tonk Women"
- Nicky Hopkins – piano on "2000 Light Years from Home", "We Love You", Street Fighting Man", "She's A Rainbow", and "Honky Tonk Women"; harpsichord on "She's A Rainbow", and "Dandelion"
- John Paul Jones – string arrangement on "She's A Rainbow"
- Mike Leander – trumpet arrangements on "Have You Seen Your Mother, Baby, Standing in the Shadow?"
- Mike Leander Orchestra – trumpets on "Have You Seen Your Mother, Baby, Standing in the Shadow?"
- John Lennon – backing vocals on "We Love You" and “Dandelion”
- Dave Mason – shehnai, bass drum on "Street Fighting Man"
- Paul McCartney – backing vocals on "We Love You" and “Dandelion”
- Jimmy Miller – backing vocals on "Jumpin' Jack Flash"; cowbell on "Honky Tonk Women"
- Jack Nitzsche – piano on "Ruby Tuesday", "Let's Spend The Night Together", "Paint It Black", and "Have You Seen Your Mother, Baby, Standing in the Shadow?"; harpsichord on "Sittin' on a Fence"
- Andrew Loog Oldham – backing vocals on "Have You Seen Your Mother, Baby, Standing in the Shadow?"
- Ian Stewart – piano on "Jumpin' Jack Flash"

== Charts ==
Chart (1969–1970)	Peak position
Australian Albums (Kent Music Report)	9
Canada Top Albums/CDs (RPM)	2
Dutch Albums (Album Top 100)	5
Finland (The Official Finnish Charts)	9
German Albums (Offizielle Top 100)	13
Italian Albums (Musica e Dischi)	6
Japanese Albums (Oricon)	118
Norwegian Albums (VG-lista)	10
UK Albums (Official Charts)	2
US Billboard 200	2

== Certifications ==
Region	Certification	Certified units/sales
United Kingdom (BPI) 2006 release	Gold	100,000^{‡}
United States (RIAA)	Platinum	1,000,000^{^}
^{^} Shipments figures based on certification alone.^{‡} Sales+streaming figures based on certification alone.
