= Let It Bleed =

Studio album by the Rolling Stones
- Released: 28 November 1969
- Recorded: November 1968 – November 1969
- Studios: Olympic, London; Elektra and Sunset Sound, Los Angeles
- Genres: Hard rock; blues; country blues
- Length: 42:21
- Labels: Decca (UK); London (US)
- Producer: Jimmy Miller

The Rolling Stones chronology
Through the Past, Darkly (Big Hits Vol. 2) (1969)	Let It Bleed (1969)	Get Yer Ya-Ya's Out! (1970)

The Rolling Stones studio album chronology
Beggars Banquet (1968)	Let It Bleed (1969)	Sticky Fingers (1971)

Let It Bleed is the eighth studio album by the English rock band the Rolling Stones, released on 28 November 1969 by London Records in the United States and on 5 December 1969 by Decca Records in the United Kingdom. Released during the band's 1969 American Tour, it is the follow-up to Beggars Banquet (1968), and, like that album, is a return to the group's more blues-oriented approach that was prominent in the pre-Aftermath (1966) period of their career. Additional sounds on the album draw influence from gospel, country blues and country rock.

The album was recorded during a period of turmoil in the band; Brian Jones, the band's founder and original leader, had become increasingly unreliable in the studio due to heavy drug use, and during most recording sessions was either absent, or so incapacitated that he was unable to contribute meaningfully. He was fired in the midst of recording sessions for this album, and replaced by Mick Taylor. Jones contributed to only two songs, playing backing instruments. He died within a month of being fired.

Taylor had been hired after principal recording was complete on many of the tracks, and appears on two songs, having recorded some guitar overdubs. Keith Richards was the band's sole guitarist during most of the recording sessions, being responsible for nearly all of the rhythm and lead parts. The other Stones members (vocalist Mick Jagger, bassist Bill Wyman, and drummer Charlie Watts) appear on nearly every track, with contributions by percussionist Jimmy Miller (who also produced the album), keyboardists Nicky Hopkins, Al Kooper and Ian Stewart (himself a former member of the band), and guest musicians including Ry Cooder.

The album reached top ten positions in several markets, including reaching number one in the UK and number three in the US. While no high-charting singles were released from the album, many of its songs became staples of Rolling Stones live shows and on rock radio stations, including "Gimme Shelter" and "You Can't Always Get What You Want", both of which frequently appear on lists of the greatest songs ever. The album was voted number 40 in Colin Larkin's All Time Top 1000 Albums 3rd edition (2000). In 2005, the album was inducted into the Grammy Hall of Fame, and is on various iterations of Rolling Stone magazine's "The 500 Greatest Albums of All Time" list.

== Recording ==
Although the Rolling Stones had begun the recording of "You Can't Always Get What You Want" in November 1968, before Beggars Banquet had been released, recording for Let It Bleed began in earnest in February 1969 and continued sporadically until early November. Brian Jones, the band's original leader and founder, had, over the course of the recording of the previous two albums, become increasingly detached from the group. Though present in the studio, he was frequently too intoxicated to contribute meaningfully, and after a motorcycle accident in May 1969, missed several recording sessions whilst recovering. Always a talented multi-instrumentalist, Jones had previously contributed extensively on guitar, forming an integral part of the dual-guitar sound that was central to the band's chemistry. He was fired from the band during the recording of Let It Bleed, having performed on only two tracks: playing autoharp on "You Got the Silver", and percussion on "Midnight Rambler". A month after being fired, Jones was found at the bottom of his swimming pool at his home. The coroner's report stated this was a drowning, later revised to "death by misadventure".

As with the previous album, most of the guitar parts were recorded instead by the band's other guitarist, Keith Richards, during the period of principal recording. Jones' replacement, Mick Taylor, appears on just two tracks, "Country Honk" and "Live with Me", having contributed some overdubs during the May 1969 London Olympic Studios recording sessions. He also appears on "Honky Tonk Women", a stand-alone single recorded during the Let It Bleed sessions.

Richards sang his first solo lead vocal on a Rolling Stones recording with "You Got the Silver", having previously sung harmony and background vocals with primary vocalist Mick Jagger on "Connection" and shared alternating lead vocals with Jagger on parts of "Something Happened to Me Yesterday" and "Salt of the Earth". Additional vocals were provided by the London Bach Choir, who sang on "You Can't Always Get What You Want". The choir distanced themselves from their contribution, however, citing what author Stephen Davis terms its "relentless drug ambience". Bassist Bill Wyman appears on every track except for two, on which Richards played bass. Drummer Charlie Watts performed on all of the tracks except for "You Can't Always Get What You Want"; he struggled to attain the sought-after rhythm, so producer Jimmy Miller filled in for him instead.

Let It Bleed was originally scheduled for release in July 1969. Although "Honky Tonk Women" was released as a single that month, the album itself was delayed and eventually released in December 1969, after the band's US tour had completed. The majority of the album was recorded at Olympic Studios in London, with further work taking place at Elektra Sound Recorders Studios in Los Angeles, California, while the Stones prepared for the tour. The Los Angeles-recorded portions included overdubs by guest musicians Merry Clayton (on "Gimme Shelter"), Byron Berline (on "Country Honk"), and Bobby Keys and Leon Russell (on "Live with Me").

== Musical style ==
As with Beggars Banquet the previous year, the album marks a return to the group's more blues-based approach that was prominent in the pre-Aftermath period of their career. The main inspiration during this string of albums was American roots music and Let It Bleed is no exception, drawing heavily from gospel (evident in "Gimme Shelter" and "You Can't Always Get What You Want"), Hank Williams and Jimmie Rodgers ("Country Honk"), Chicago blues ("Midnight Rambler"), as well as country blues ("You Got the Silver", "Love in Vain") and country rock ("Let It Bleed").

Don Heckman, writing in The New York Times, felt that Let It Bleed was a "heavy" and "passionately erotic" album of hard rock and blues, influenced by African-American music. Richie Unterberger, writing for AllMusic, said it "extends the rock and blues feel of Beggars Banquet into slightly harder-rocking, more demonically sexual territory". Mojo magazine's James McNair felt the record had an emphasis on "earthy" country blues.

Through their experimentation during the mid-1960s, the band had developed an eclectic approach to arrangements. Slide guitar playing is prominent (played entirely by Richards, except "Country Honk", which was performed by Taylor), and is featured on all songs except "Gimme Shelter", "Live with Me" and "You Can't Always Get What You Want", giving the album an authentic blues feel throughout. In addition, an array of session musicians embellish the songs with various instruments. Alongside the piano performances (Ian Stewart, Nicky Hopkins), the record included fiddle (Byron Berline), mandolin (Ry Cooder), piano, organ and French horn (Al Kooper), as well as vibraphone (Wyman) and autoharp (Wyman and Jones). Of more importance, however, was the debut of both renowned saxophonist Bobby Keys on "Live with Me", a musician who was integral at giving the group's arrangements a soul/jazz background, and Taylor, who took on lead guitar duties with technically proficient playing, giving the band a harder rock sound during the late 1960s and early 1970s.

=== Lyrics ===
Jann Wenner, in a 1995 Rolling Stone interview with Jagger, describes the album's songs as "disturbing" and the scenery as "ugly". When asked if the Vietnam War played a role in the album's worldview, Jagger said: "I think so. Even though I was living in America only part time, I was influenced. All those images were on television. Plus, the spill out onto campuses".

== Release ==
The album was released in the US as an LP record, reel-to-reel tape, audio cassette and 8-track cartridge in 1969, and as a remastered CD and chrome cassette tape in 1986. In August 2002, it was reissued in a remastered CD and SACD digipak by ABKCO Records, and once more in 2010 by Universal Music Enterprises in a Japanese only SHM-SACD version. A mono version was included in the 2016 box-set The Rolling Stones in Mono. In September 2019, a remastered 50th anniversary edition of Let It Bleed was announced for release by ABKCO on November 15. It comes with two 180g vinyl LPs with the album in both stereo and mono. Bob Ludwig remastered Let It Bleed for its 50th anniversary reissue.

=== Packaging ===
Jagger asked artist M. C. Escher to design a cover for the album, but he declined. Robert Brownjohn then designed the cover, which displays a surreal sculpture. The image consists of the Let It Bleed record being played by the tone-arm of an antique phonograph, and a record-changer spindle supporting several items stacked on a plate in place of a stack of records: a film canister labelled Stones – Let It Bleed, a clock dial, a pizza, a bicycle tire and a cake with elaborate icing topped by figurines representing the band. The cake parts of the construction were prepared by then-unknown cookery writer Delia Smith. The reverse of the LP sleeve shows the same "record-stack" melange in a state of disarray. The artwork was inspired by the working title of the album, which was Automatic Changer.

The album cover was among the ten chosen by the Royal Mail for a set of "Classic Album Cover" postage stamps issued in January 2010.

== Reception ==
Professional ratings
Retrospective reviews
Review scores
Source	Rating
AllMusic	5/5 stars
And It Don't Stop	A+
Encyclopedia of Popular Music	5/5 stars
Entertainment Weekly	A
The Great Rock Discography	9/10
Music Story	5/5 stars
MusicHound Rock	5/5
NME	9/10
Rolling Stone	5/5 stars
The Rolling Stone Album Guide	5/5 stars

Released in December, Let It Bleed reached number 1 on the UK Albums Chart (temporarily demoting the Beatles' Abbey Road) and number 3 on the Billboard Top LPs chart in the US, where it was eventually certified 2× platinum by the Recording Industry Association of America (RIAA). In a contemporary review for Rolling Stone magazine, music critic Greil Marcus said that the middle of the album has "great" songs, but "Gimme Shelter" and "You Can't Always Get What You Want" "seem to matter most" because they "both reach for reality and end up confronting it, almost mastering what's real, or what reality will feel like as the years fade in." Robert Christgau named it the fourth-best album of 1969 in his ballot for Jazz & Pop magazine's annual critics poll. In later commentaries, he has said the album "still speak[s] to me with startling fullness and authority", with the quality of the "playing" alone "fantastic", and that despite some "duff moments" on side two, every song "stands up".

In a retrospective review, NME magazine said that the album "tugs and teases" in various musical directions and called it "a classic". In his 2001 Stones biography, Stephen Davis said of the album "No rock record, before or since, has ever so completely captured the sense of palpable dread that hung over its era." In a five-star review for Rolling Stone in 2004, Gavin Edwards praised Richards' guitar playing throughout the album, and stated: "Whether it was spiritual, menstrual or visceral, the Stones made sure you went home covered in blood." Jason McNeil of PopMatters wrote that Beggars Banquet and Let It Bleed are "the two greatest albums the band's (or anyone's) ever made". In Steven Van Zandt's opinion, Let It Bleed was one in the Stones' series of four studio LPs—including Beggars Banquet (1968), Sticky Fingers (1971) and Exile on Main St. (1972)—that was "the greatest run of albums in history".

The album was included in a "Basic Record Library" of 1950s and 1960s recordings, published in Christgau's Record Guide: Rock Albums of the Seventies (1981). In 2000, Q magazine ranked it at number 28 in its list of "The 100 Greatest British Albums Ever". In 2001, the TV network VH1 placed Let It Bleed at 24th on their "100 Greatest Albums of R 'n' R" survey. In 1997, it was voted the 27th-best album ever by The Guardian. In 2003, Rolling Stone ranked it at number 32 on the magazine's list of the "500 Greatest Albums of All Time". It maintained the rating in a 2012 revised list, and was ranked at number 41 in a 2020 revised list. It was inducted into the Grammy Hall of Fame in 2005.

== Track listing ==
The track listing on the back of the album jacket did not follow the one on the album itself. According to Brownjohn, he altered it purely for visual reasons; the correct order was shown on the record's label. Additionally, "Gimme Shelter" is rendered as "Gimmie Shelter" on the jacket. Most releases have "Gimmie Shelter" on the cover, the inner sleeve and the LP label, until 2019.

All tracks are written by Mick Jagger and Keith Richards, except "Love in Vain" by Robert Johnson. Early US editions of the album credit the song to Woody Payne, a pseudonym used by a music publisher of the songs of Robert Johnson.

Side one
No.	Title	Length
1.	"Gimme Shelter"	4:31
2.	"Love in Vain"	4:19
3.	"Country Honk"	3:09
4.	"Live with Me"	3:33
5.	"Let It Bleed"	5:26
Total length:		20:58

Side two
No.	Title	Length
6.	"Midnight Rambler"	6:52
7.	"You Got the Silver"	2:51
8.	"Monkey Man"	4:12
9.	"You Can't Always Get What You Want"	7:28
Total length:		21:23

== Personnel ==
Track numbers noted in parentheses below are based on the CD track numbering where the titles of the second side are numbered from 6 to 9.

The Rolling Stones

- Mick Jagger – vocals (all but 7), harmonica (1, 6)
- Keith Richards – electric guitar (all but 3), acoustic guitar (2–3, 5, 7, 9), slide guitar (2, 5–8), backing vocals (1, 3, 8), bass guitar (4), lead vocals (7)
- Brian Jones – congas (6), autoharp (7)
- Bill Wyman – bass guitar (1–2, 5–9), autoharp (5), vibraphone (8)
- Charlie Watts – drums (all but 9)
- Mick Taylor – slide guitar (3), electric guitar (4)

Additional personnel

- Ian Stewart – piano (5)
- Nicky Hopkins – piano (1, 4, 7–8), organ (7)
- Byron Berline – fiddle (3)
- Ry Cooder – mandolin (2)
- Bobby Keys – tenor saxophone (4)
- Jimmy Miller – güiro and maracas (1), drums (9), tambourine (8)
- Leon Russell – piano, horn arrangements (both on 4)
- Jack Nitzsche – choral arrangements (9)
- Al Kooper – piano, French horn, and organ (all on 9)
- Merry Clayton – lead and backing vocals (1)
- Nanette Workman – backing vocals (3, 9) (credited as Nanette Newman on the LP)
- Doris Troy – backing vocals (9)
- Madeline Bell – backing vocals (9)
- Rocky Dijon – percussion (9)
- The London Bach Choir – vocals (9)

Technical personnel

- Jimmy Miller – production
- Glyn Johns – engineering
- Alan "Irish" O'Duffy, George Chkiantz – assistant engineering (Olympic)
- Bruce Botnick, Jerry Hansen – assistant engineering (Sunset Sound)
- Dave Bridges, Keith Harwood, Steve Stratton – tape operators
- Robert Brownjohn – liner design
- Victor Kahn – poster design
- Don McAllester – photography

== Charts ==
1969–1970 weekly chart performance for Let It Bleed
Chart (1969–1970)	Peak position
Australian Albums (Kent Music Report)	2
Canada Top Albums/CDs (RPM)	4
Dutch Albums (Album Top 100)	1
Finland (The Official Finnish Charts)	12
German Albums (Offizielle Top 100)	3
Italian Albums (Musica e Dischi)	7
Japanese Albums (Oricon)	11
Norwegian Albums (VG-lista)	2
Sweden (Kvällstoppen)	5
UK Albums (Official Charts)	1
US Billboard Top LPs	3
US Best Selling Soul LP's (Billboard)	19

2007 weekly chart performance for Let It Bleed
Chart (2007)	Peak position
Swedish Albums (Sverigetopplistan)	37

2012 weekly chart performance for Let It Bleed
Chart (2012)	Peak position
French Albums (SNEP)	138

2019 weekly chart performance for Let It Bleed
Chart (2019)	Peak position
Belgian Albums (Ultratop Flanders)	112
Belgian Albums (Ultratop Wallonia)	128
Spanish Albums (Promusicae)	64

== Certifications ==
Certifications for Let It Bleed
Region	Certification	Certified units/sales
Australia (ARIA)	Platinum	70,000^{‡}
Canada (Music Canada)	Platinum	100,000^{^}
Netherlands (NVPI)	Gold	25,000
United Kingdom (BPI)	Platinum	300,000^{^}
United States (RIAA)	2× Platinum	2,000,000^{^}
^{^} Shipments figures based on certification alone.^{‡} Sales+streaming figures based on certification alone.
