= Stray Cat Blues =

Song by the Rolling Stones

from the album Beggars Banquet
- Released: 6 December 1968
- Recorded: 1968
- Genre: Proto-metal, hard rock, blues rock
- Length: 4:40
- Label: ABKCO
- Songwriter: Jagger/Richards
- Producer: Jimmy Miller

"Stray Cat Blues" is the eighth song on the Rolling Stones' album Beggars Banquet. It was written by Mick Jagger and Keith Richards and produced by Jimmy Miller. Miller's production of the song is very representative of his style, featuring a very prominent hi hat beat, droning piano performed by Nicky Hopkins, a mellotron performed by Brian Jones, all electric guitars performed by Richards and vocals from Jagger kept even in the mix. According to Mick Jagger, the song was inspired by "Heroin" by the Velvet Underground, with the intros of both songs being particularly similar.

== Background ==
The song is told from the perspective of a man lusting for illegal sex with a 15-year-old groupie, reasoning that "it's no hanging matter, it's no capital crime". During the performance of the song from the Get Yer Ya-Ya's Out! 1970 live album, Jagger changed the lyric to "thirteen years old".

== Reception ==
Jim Beviglia ranked "Stray Cat Blues" the 49th best Rolling Stones song in Counting Down the Rolling Stones: Their 100 Finest Songs. Uncut called it "an absolutely filthy song" but ranked it 39th in its Top 40 Rolling Stones songs. Rolling Stone ranked it 43rd in its countdown of the band's top 100 songs, calling it "a sleazy rocker."

Nitzer Ebb covered this song on the "I Give To You" single in 1991. Johnny Winter covered this song in 1974. A version of the song also appeared on Soundgarden's 1992 EP Satanoscillatemymetallicsonatas and as a B-side on the single for their song "Jesus Christ Pose".

The song appears in the video game Guitar Hero: Warriors of Rock and in the film Joy.

== Personnel ==
- Mick Jagger – vocals
- Keith Richards – electric guitar, slide guitar, bass
- Brian Jones – Mellotron
- Charlie Watts – drums
- Nicky Hopkins – piano
- Rocky Dijon – congas
