= Jigsaw Puzzle (song) =

Song by the Rolling Stones

from the album Beggars Banquet
- Released: 6 December 1968
- Recorded: April 1968
- Genre: Blues rock; country rock
- Length: 6:07
- Label: ABKCO
- Songwriter(s): Mick Jagger/Keith Richards
- Producer(s): Jimmy Miller

"Jigsaw Puzzle" (sometimes spelled "Jig-Saw Puzzle") is a song by English rock band the Rolling Stones, featured on their 1968 album Beggars Banquet.

== Composition ==
Written by Mick Jagger and Keith Richards, "Jigsaw Puzzle" is one of the longer songs on the album. It comes in just ten seconds shorter than "Sympathy for the Devil".

Parts of the recording sessions are available on the bootleg market, and on these recordings, Jagger is on acoustic guitar, Richards on electric slide guitar, Charlie Watts on drums, Bill Wyman on bass, and Nicky Hopkins on piano. The released version has Richards on acoustic guitar and on slide guitar, with Brian Jones playing the distinctive "whine" throughout the song on a Mellotron. "Jigsaw Puzzle" has never been performed live by the Rolling Stones.

== Critical reception ==
Musical opinions have varied widely on the merits of "Jigsaw Puzzle". Journalist Richie Unterberger describes it unenthusiastically as a mere "album filler". He draws comparisons to the mid-to-late 1960s work of Bob Dylan. (Dylan's name appears among the graffiti on the album cover.) Unterberg writes "...the similarity to some of Dylan's long, wordy surreal songs of the mid-'60s is close enough that it's a little surprising 'Jigsaw Puzzle' hasn't been singled out by more listeners as being a Dylan imitation, particularly since it frankly sounds a little hackneyed in its approximation of Dylanesque weirdness." Some Dylanologists consider this song to be a direct response to the 1966, "Stuck Inside of Mobile with the Memphis Blues Again." The lyrics depict the observations of the singer who finds himself surrounded by "misfits and weirdos";

There's a tramp sittin' on my doorstep, tryin' to waste his time
With his methylated sandwich, he's a walking clothesline
And here comes the bishop's daughter, on the other side
She looks a trifle jealous, she's been an outcast all her life

Me, I'm waiting so patiently, lying on the floor
I'm just trying to do my jig-saw puzzle before it rains anymore

Of the song, Unterberger concludes, " Like many of the tracks on that album, it drew on country blues for musical inspiration... The lyrics, however, are not the sort that would be heard on actual rural Delta blues records... More of a drawback to the song, however, is its lack of melodic development, just keeping on the same basic monotonous stock blues tune for a good six minutes or so. For album filler such as this, some other creative touches were needed to make it stand out more."

In 2004, Jason MacNeil of PopMatters wrote: "Of the 19 songs on the two albums, there are two that stand out head and shoulders above anything else. And no, they aren't the obvious ones most would think of. I'm talking about 'Jigsaw Puzzle' and 'Monkey Man'. Unfortunately ignored on 40 Licks, both tunes capture the band's blues-rock at its finest. 'Jigsaw Puzzle' starts a bit stilted before finding its legs by the second verse and definitely by the initial chorus. Defining the outcasts on the street before later going through the band one by one, the Glimmer Twins nailed Wyman's persona almost as much as Wyman nailed his hundreds of groupies. 'And the bass player, he looks nervous, about the girls outside,' Jagger sings. And again the blues slide guitar is complemented by Nicky Hopkins's piano touches at the end".

In 2007, BBC's Daryl Easlea concluded, "The self-referencing and mocking 'Jigsaw Puzzle' is a treat".

Jim Beviglia ranked "Jigsaw Puzzle" the 30th best Rolling Stones song in Counting Down the Rolling Stones: Their 100 Finest Songs. Complex.com called it "the album's most lyrically adventurous song" and ranked it 39th in its Top 50 Rolling Stones songs. Rolling Stone ranked it 69th in its countdown of the band's top 100 songs, calling it "a country-rock blast of Highway 61 Revisited surrealism."

== Personnel ==
The Rolling Stones

- Mick Jagger – vocals
- Keith Richards – acoustic guitar, slide guitar
- Brian Jones – Mellotron
- Bill Wyman – bass guitar
- Charlie Watts – drums

Additional personnel

- Nicky Hopkins – piano
