= Beggars Banquet (disambiguation) =

Beggars Banquet is a 1968 album by the Rolling Stones.

- Beggars Banquet (book), a 2002 story collection by Ian Rankin
- Beggars Banquet Records, an English record label established in 1973
