= Street Fighting Man =

Single by the Rolling Stones

from the album Beggars Banquet
- B-side: "No Expectations" (US); "Surprise, Surprise" & "Everybody Needs Somebody to Love" (UK)
- Released: 30 August 1968 (US); July 1971 (UK)
- Recorded: April–May 1968
- Genre: Hard rock; rock and roll; raga rock
- Length: 3:09 (single); 3:16 (album)
- Label: London
- Songwriter: Jagger–Richards
- Producer: Jimmy Miller

The Rolling Stones US singles chronology
"Jumpin' Jack Flash" (1968)	"Street Fighting Man" (1968)	"Honky Tonk Women" (1969)

Audio sample
- file; help

Alternative cover
- French single picture sleeve

"Street Fighting Man" is a song by the English rock band the Rolling Stones, written by the songwriting team of Mick Jagger and Keith Richards. Considered one of the band's most popular and most controversial songs, it features Indian instrumentation contributed by Brian Jones, which has led to it being characterized as a raga rock song. It also features controversial and ambiguous lyrics about armed revolution. In the United States, it was released as a single in August 1968, while it was not released in the United Kingdom until four months later on the Beggars Banquet album, where it opened side two. (It eventually saw release as a UK single in 1971.) The B-side of the American single featured "No Expectations", considered one of the final Stones tracks in which founding member Jones played a significant role in its construction. It was also the final Rolling Stones single on which Jones performed.

While "Street Fighting Man" was originally written with an entirely different set of lyrics, growing violence at political events throughout 1968 inspired Mick Jagger to alter the song to directly address such topics. With its release coming after a highly politically charged and publicized summer of violence, and the release of the Beatles' "Revolution", a song with similar themes, "Street Fighting Man" sparked controversy in the United States upon release, many radio stations boycotting the song and refusing to play it. As a result, the song peaked only at number 48 on the Billboard Hot 100, after the previous Stones single "Jumpin' Jack Flash" reached the top three in America. "Street Fighting Man" thus became the lowest-charting Rolling Stones A-side since their American single debut "Not Fade Away", four years prior.

Despite the initial poor chart reception and controversy, "Street Fighting Man" was praised by the music press upon its release, and played a role in elevating the Rolling Stones' reputation as a culturally subversive group. Retrospectively, the song has been praised for its lyrics and production, and is viewed by some commentators as one of the greatest and most important songs of the 1960s. In 2004, Rolling Stone magazine ranked the song number 295 on its list of the 500 Greatest Songs of All Time, while Pitchfork ranked it the 62nd best song of the 1960s.

== Background ==
Throughout 1965 and 1966, the Stones moved further from their traditional blues-based sound and experimented more and more with Indian timbres in their music, with prominent examples of this trend in their work including "Mother's Little Helper" and "Paint It Black" Additionally, Brian Jones, the original leader of the Rolling Stones, became an important creative force within the band due to his contributions on multiple instruments during the sessions for Aftermath, Between the Buttons, and Their Satanic Majesties Request. "Street Fighting Man" became one of the final songs recorded by the Stones for which Brian Jones played a major role in the final arrangement, alongside its B-side "No Expectations", for which he contributed a slide guitar part. It was their final A-side to feature him and last to be released before his death.

While the final version of "Street Fighting Man" featured Indian musical elements like earlier Stones songs, the song's creation did not result from these influences. In an interview with Marc Myers, Keith Richards said that he wrote most of the music for the song in late 1966 or early 1967 on the acoustic guitar, and got the "dry, crisp" sound that he wanted by strumming a guitar with an open tuning in front of a portable Philips cassette recorder microphone, leading to notable distortion in the sound. According to Richards, the melody was influenced by the sound of police sirens, despite the song not having acquired its final, politically conscious lyrics at this stage of its evolution.

== Development ==
Following the composition of the music for the song, a set of lyrics were written that differed significantly from the final song. Originally the song was entitled "Did Everyone Pay Their Dues?", and featured a set of lyrics about adult brutality, The finalized version of "Street Fighting Man" is known as one of Mick Jagger and Keith Richards' most politically inclined works. Jagger allegedly wrote a new set of lyrics to the song about Tariq Ali after he attended a 1968 anti-war rally at London's US embassy, during which mounted police attempted to control a crowd of 25,000. He also found inspiration in the rising violence among student rioters on Paris' Left Bank, the precursor to a period of civil unrest in May 1968.

Jagger explained how the inspiration for "Street Fighting Man" came from movements outside of his native United Kingdom in a 1995 interview with Jann Wenner in Rolling Stone:

Yeah, it was a direct inspiration, because by contrast, London was very quiet ... It was a very strange time in France. But not only in France but also in America, because of the Vietnam War and these endless disruptions ... I thought it was a very good thing at the time. There was all this violence going on. I mean, they almost toppled the government in France; de Gaulle went into this complete funk, as he had in the past, and he went and sort of locked himself in his house in the country. And so the government was almost inactive. And the French riot police were amazing.

Richards said, only a few years after recording the track in a 1971 Rolling Stone interview with Robert Greenfield, that the song had been "interpreted thousands of different ways". He mentioned how Jagger went to the Grosvenor Square demonstrations in London and was even charged by the police, yet on the topic of the song's meaning, he ultimately claims, "it really is ambiguous as a song".

== Recording ==
Recording on "Street Fighting Man" took place at Olympic Sound Studios from April until May 1968, as part of the Beggars Banquet sessions. Jimmy Miller, the Rolling Stones' producer during this period described guitarist Keith Richards as "a real workhorse" while recording the album, mostly due to the infrequent presence of Brian Jones. When he did show up at the sessions, Jones behaved erratically due to his drug use and emotional problems. Miller said that Jones would "show up occasionally when he was in the mood to play, and he could never really be relied on:

When he would show up at a session—let's say he had just bought a sitar that day, he'd feel like playing it, so he'd look in his calendar to see if the Stones were in. Now he may have missed the previous four sessions. We'd be doing let's say, a blues thing. He'd walk in with a sitar, which was totally irrelevant to what we were doing, and want to play it. I used to try to accommodate him. I would isolate him, put him in a booth and not record him onto any track that we really needed. And the others, particularly Mick and Keith, would often say to me, 'Just tell him to piss off and get the hell out of here'.

Even given this, Jones contributes to every track on Beggars Banquet except the final two, playing sitar and tanpura on "Street Fighting Man". Other personnel on the song include Jagger on vocals, Richards plays the song's acoustic guitar parts as well as the bass guitar, the only electric instrument featured on the recording. Charlie Watts plays drums while Nicky Hopkins performs the song's piano which is largely buried in the mix, but is most distinctly heard during the coda. Shehnai is performed on the track by Dave Mason. On the earlier, unreleased "Did Everybody Pay Their Dues" version, Rick Grech played a very prominent electric viola.

Watts said in 2003:

"Street Fighting Man" was recorded on Keith's cassette with a 1930s toy drum kit called a London Jazz Kit Set, which I bought in an antiques shop, and which I've still got at home. It came in a little suitcase, and there were wire brackets you put the drums in; they were like small tambourines with no jangles ... The snare drum was fantastic because it had a really thin skin with a snare right underneath, but only two strands of gut ... Keith loved playing with the early cassette machines because they would overload, and when they overload they sounded fantastic, although you weren't meant to do that. We usually played in one of the bedrooms on tour. Keith would be sitting on a cushion playing a guitar and the tiny kit was a way of getting close to him. The drums were really loud compared to the acoustic guitar and the pitch of them would go right through the sound. You'd always have a great backbeat.

Richards commented on the recording:

The basic track of that was done on a mono cassette with very distorted recording, on a Philips with no limiters. Brian is playing sitar, it twangs away. He's holding notes that wouldn't come through if you had a board, you wouldn't be able to fit it in. But on a cassette if you just move the people, it does. Cut in the studio and then put on a tape. Started putting percussion and bass on it. That was really an electronic track, up in the realms.

== Releases ==
Released as Beggars Banquet's lead single in August 1968 in the US, "Street Fighting Man" was popular on release, but did not reach the Top 40 (reaching number 48) of the US charts in response to many radio stations' refusal to play the song based on what were perceived as subversive lyrics. "No Expectations", also from Beggars Banquet, was used as the single's B-side. As usual with Stones' album tracks in the 60s, the single did not see a release at the time in the UK. It was released in 1971 backed with "Surprise, Surprise", the closing track from the Stones' American-only album The Rolling Stones, Now, previously released in the UK only on the various artists Decca LP compilation 14 in 1965.

The US single version was released in mono with an additional vocal overdub on the choruses, and thus is different from the Beggars Banquet album's stereo version. While many of the US London picture sleeves are rare and collectable, the sleeve for this single is particularly scarce and is considered their most valuable.

The album version of the song has been included on the compilations Through the Past, Darkly (Big Hits Vol. 2) (1969), Hot Rocks 1964–1971 (1971), 30 Greatest Hits (1977), Singles Collection: The London Years (1989 edition), Forty Licks (2002), and GRRR! (2012). The US single version was included on the 2002 edition of Singles Collection: The London Years and on Stray Cats, a collection of singles and rarities released as part of the box set The Rolling Stones in Mono (2016).

A staple at Rolling Stones live shows since the band's American Tour of 1969, concert recordings of the song have been captured and released for the live albums Get Yer Ya-Ya's Out! (recorded 1969, released 1970), Stripped (1995; rereleased on Totally Stripped in 2016), Live Licks (recorded 2003, released 2004), and Hyde Park Live (2013).

== Reception ==
=== Critical reception ===
According to music journalist Anthony DeCurtis, the "political correctness" of "Street Fighting Man", particularly the lyrics "What can a poor boy do/'Cept sing in a rock and roll band", sparked intense debate in the underground media. The song opens with a strummed acoustic guitar riff. In his review, Richie Unterberger says of the song, "[I]t's a great track, gripping the listener immediately with its sudden, springy guitar chords and thundering, offbeat drums. That unsettling, urgent guitar rhythm is the mainstay of the verses. Mick Jagger's typically half-buried lyrics seem at casual listening like a call to revolution."

Unterberger continues, "Perhaps they were saying they wished they could be on the front lines, but were not in the right place at the right time; perhaps they were saying, as John Lennon did in the Beatles' "Revolution", that they didn't want to be involved in violent confrontation. Or perhaps they were even declaring indifference to the tumult."

Music journalist Greil Marcus, who was demonstrating in Berkeley during the weekend of the convention in Chicago, contrasted "Street Fighting Man" to the contemporary Beatles b-side "Revolution". In his words, "[The Beatles] were ordering us to pack up and go home, but the Stones seemed to be saying that we were lucky if we had a fight to make and a place to take a stand." The far left contrasted "Revolution" with "Street Fighting Man"; despite the ambiguity in Jagger's lyrics, "Street Fighting Man" was perceived to be supportive of a radical agenda. As a result of the contrasts drawn between the Beatles and Stones, French film director Jean-Luc Godard publicly attacked John Lennon and the Beatles for their apolitical stance, while praising the Stones. Lennon accused Godard of being insincere in his criticism, and alleged his true motivation for his attacks was the Beatles' choice to decline working with him on his film One Plus One, while the Stones agreed to participate.

In the years since the song's release, writers' interpretations have varied widely. In 1976, Roy Carr assessed it as a "great summer street-corner rock anthem on the same echelon as 'Summer in the City', 'Summertime Blues', and 'Dancing in the Street'." In 1979, Dave Marsh wrote that as part of Beggars Banquet, "Street Fighting Man" was the "keynote, with its teasing admonition to do something and its refusal to admit that doing it will make any difference; as usual, the Stones were more correct, if also more faithless, philosophers than any of their peers." In fact, the second line of the first verse alludes to "Dancing in the Street"; a similar line had been present in the aforementioned song, where "fighting" instead was "dancing".

=== Backlash in the United States ===
The song was released within a week of the violent confrontations between the police and anti-Vietnam War protesters at the 1968 Democratic National Convention in Chicago. Worried about the possibility of the song inciting further violence, Chicago radio stations refused to play the song. This was much to the delight of Mick Jagger, who stated: "I'm rather pleased to hear they have banned (the song). The last time they banned one of our records in America, it sold a million." Jagger said he was told they thought the record was subversive, to which he snapped: "Of course it's subversive! It's stupid to think you can start a revolution with a record. I wish you could." Despite Jagger's statements, the ban and general aversion to the song among radio programmers was likely a factor in its commercial underperformance relative to other Stones singles.

Keith Richards weighed into the debate when he said that the fact a couple of radio stations in Chicago banned the record "just goes to show how paranoid they are". At the same time they were still requested to do live appearances and Richards said: "If you really want us to cause trouble, we could do a few stage appearances. We are more subversive when we go on stage."

=== Retrospective views ===
Since its inclusion on the Stones' album Beggars Banquet, "Street Fighting Man" has been traditionally seen as a highlight of the album. Colin Larkin, in his Encyclopedia of Popular Music (2006), wrote that Beggars Banquet was "a return to strength" which included "the socio-political 'Street Fighting Man'.

Bruce Springsteen would comment in 1985, after including "Street Fighting Man" in the encores of some of his Born in the U.S.A. Tour shows: "That one line, 'What can a poor boy do but sing in a rock and roll band?' is one of the greatest rock and roll lines of all time ... [The song] has that edge-of-the-cliff thing when you hit it. And it's funny; it's got humour to it."

When asked about the song's relevance in Rolling Stone magazine thirty years following its release, Mick Jagger said "I don't know if it [has any]. I don't know whether we should really play it. I was persuaded to put it [on Voodoo Lounge Tour] because it seemed to fit in, but I'm not sure if it really has any resonance for the present day. I don't really like it that much." Despite this, the song has been performed on a majority of the Stones' tours since its introduction to their canon of work, and is usually played second to last before their usual closing track "Jumpin' Jack Flash".

== Personnel ==
According to authors Philippe Margotin and Jean-Michel Guesdon:

The Rolling Stones

- Mick Jagger – vocals, maracas
- Keith Richards – acoustic guitars, bass
- Brian Jones – sitar, tamboura
- Charlie Watts – drums

Additional personnel

- Nicky Hopkins – piano
- Dave Mason – shehnai, bass drum
- Unidentified musician – claves (Note: Margotin and Guesdon are uncertain who played claves, but suggest it was possibly the session's producer, Jimmy Miller.)

== Charts ==
Chart (1968)	Peak position
Austria (Ö3 Austria Top 40)	7
Belgium (Ultratop 50 Flanders)	13
Canada Top Singles (RPM)	32
Germany (GfK)	7
Netherlands (Single Top 100)	5
Sweden (Kvällstoppen)	9
Switzerland (Schweizer Hitparade)	4
US Billboard Hot 100	48
US Cash Box Top 100	30
Chart (1971)	Peak position
UK Singles (Official Charts)	21
