= Have You Seen Your Mother, Baby, Standing in the Shadow? =

1966 single by the Rolling Stones

- US picture sleeve

Single by the Rolling Stones
- B-side: "Who's Driving Your Plane?"
- Released: 23 September 1966
- Recorded: 3–11, 31 August and 8 September 1966
- Studio: RCA, Hollywood, California; IBC, London
- Length: 2:33
- Label: Decca (UK); London (US)
- Songwriter: Jagger/Richards
- Producer: Andrew Loog Oldham

Rolling Stones UK singles chronology
"Paint It Black" (1966)	"Have You Seen Your Mother, Baby, Standing in the Shadow?" (1966)	"Ruby Tuesday" / "Let's Spend the Night Together" (1967)

Rolling Stones US singles chronology
"Mother's Little Helper" (1966)	"Have You Seen Your Mother, Baby, Standing in the Shadow?" (1966)	"Let's Spend the Night Together" / "Ruby Tuesday" (1967)

Rear cover
- US picture sleeve (rear)

"Have You Seen Your Mother, Baby, Standing in the Shadow?" is a song by the English rock band the Rolling Stones. Written by Mick Jagger and Keith Richards, it was recorded in the late summer of 1966 during early sessions for what would become their Between the Buttons album. It was the first Stones single to be released simultaneously (23 September 1966) in both the UK and the US, and reached number five and number nine on those countries' charts, respectively.

== Recording and releases ==
It is the first Rolling Stones song to feature a 1920s-influenced horn section, which was arranged by Mike Leander. The group have said that they were unhappy with the final cut, bemoaning the loss of the original cut's strong rhythm section. It is also the first song Richards is said to have written on piano even though he does not play piano on the final cut. Jack Nitzsche, friend of the band and their main session pianist until early 1967, is credited playing piano. When the band mimed the song on The Ed Sullivan Show on 11 September 1966, shortly before its release, Richards mimed the piano with Jones miming the guitar.

The American picture sleeve includes a photo of the band dressed in drag, shot by Jerry Schatzberg. Peter Whitehead's promotional film for the single was one of the first music videos. The Stones only performed the song live over a span of twelve days during their 1966 tour. One live recording appears on Got Live If You Want It! (1966, US). In 1993, Jagger performed it in New York City during his only show promoting his solo album Wandering Spirit.

The song is included on several Rolling Stones compilation albums, such as the British edition of Big Hits (High Tide and Green Grass) (1966, UK), Flowers (1967, US), Through the Past, Darkly (Big Hits Vol. 2) (1969 US edition), More Hot Rocks (Big Hits & Fazed Cookies) (1972), Singles Collection: The London Years (1989), and Forty Licks (2002, with the abbreviated title "Have You Seen Your Mother Baby?").

== Reception ==
Cash Box said that it "the hard rocking, infectious sound is laced with a husky Jagger solo that builds back to a frenzied shout." Record World called it a "different, fast, funky, strange new side."

== Personnel ==
According to authors Philippe Margotin and Jean-Michel Guesdon, except where noted:

The Rolling Stones

- Mick Jagger – lead vocals, backing vocals, finger snaps
- Keith Richards – backing vocals, lead guitar, acoustic guitar, piano
- Brian Jones – rhythm guitar
- Bill Wyman – bass
- Charlie Watts – drums

Additional musicians and production

- Jack Nitzsche – piano (Note: Margotin and Guesdon suggest Nitzsche may have contributed tambourine to the track, while authors Andy Babiuk and Greg Prevost write he only played piano.)
- Andrew Loog Oldham – producer, backing vocals
- Mike Leander – orchestration (trumpets)
- Mike Leander Orchestra – trumpets
- David Hassinger – sound engineer
- Glyn Johns – sound engineer

== Charts ==
Chart (1966)	Peak position
Belgium (Ultratop 50 Flanders)	17
Canada Top Singles (RPM)	12
Finland (Soumen Virallinen)	30
Ireland (IRMA)	5
Germany (GfK)	9
Netherlands (Single Top 100)	2
New Zealand (Listener)	8
Norway (VG-lista)	6
Sweden (Kvällstoppen)	9
Sweden (Tio i Topp)	9
UK Singles (Official Charts)	5
US Billboard Hot 100	9
