= Yesterday's Papers =

Song by the Rolling Stones

from the album Between the Buttons
- Released: 20 January 1967
- Recorded: November 1966
- Genre: Psychedelic pop
- Length: 2:04 (stereo version); 2:28 (mono version)
- Label: Decca (UK); London (US)
- Songwriter: Mick Jagger/Keith Richards
- Producer: Andrew Loog Oldham

Between the Buttons track listing
- 12 tracks Side one: 1. "Yesterday's Papers"; 2. "My Obsession"; 3. "Back Street Girl"; 4. "Connection"; 5. "She Smiled Sweetly"; 6. "Cool, Calm & Collected"; Side two: 7. "All Sold Out"; 8. "Please Go Home"; 9. "Who's Been Sleeping Here?"; 10. "Complicated"; 11. "Miss Amanda Jones"; 12. "Something Happened to Me Yesterday"

Yesterday's Papers is a song by the Rolling Stones from their 1967 album, Between the Buttons. It was the first song that Mick Jagger wrote by himself for the group. It appears as the opening track on the UK version of the album and on the US version as the second track.

== Background ==
In the song, recorded in late 1966, Brian Jones's vibraphone and Jack Nitzsche's harpsichord are prominent: Keith Richards plays a distorted guitar with Charlie Watts on drums and Bill Wyman on bass. A bootleg recording exists of an alternate backing track that includes strings. There is also a stripped-down demo version with an early vocal track known.

Whereas the stereo mix fades after one chorus, the mono mix continues for one more full chorus. Additionally, the mono version is at one point near the end missing some of the backing vocals heard on the stereo version.

The song is supposedly directed at Jagger's ex-girlfriend Chrissie Shrimpton, whose relationship with Jagger at the time turned sour. It is noted for suggesting a negative treatment of women, comparing "yesterday's girl" to "yesterday's papers", as something that can be just thrown out, in similar fashion to a track on their previous album Aftermath, "Under My Thumb".

Chris Farlowe recorded the song, which was released as a single.

== Personnel ==
=== Rolling Stones version ===
According to authors Philippe Margotin and Jean-Michel Guesdon, except where noted:

The Rolling Stones

- Mick Jagger – vocals, tambourine
- Keith Richards – backing vocals, lead guitar, bass, fuzz guitar, acoustic twelve-string guitar
- Brian Jones – backing vocals, vibraphone
- Bill Wyman – backing vocals, bass
- Charlie Watts – drums

Additional musician

- Jack Nitzsche – harpsichord

=== Chris Farlowe version ===
- Chris Farlowe – lead vocals, tambourine
- The Thunderbirds – backing instrumentals
- Mick Jagger – producer
