= Sittin' on a Fence =

Single by Twice as Much
- B-side: "Baby I Want You"
- Released: May 1966
- Genre: Pop, folk
- Label: Immediate (IM 033)
- Songwriter(s): Jagger/Richards
- Producer(s): Andrew Loog Oldham

Twice as Much singles chronology
| "Sittin' on a Fence" (1966) | "Step Out of Line" (1966) |

"Sittin' on a Fence" is a song written by Mick Jagger and Keith Richards of the English rock band the Rolling Stones. The song was given to the singing duo Twice as Much, who released it as their debut single in May 1966. This version became a Top 40 hit on the UK Singles Chart, and also received some slight attention in the United States, where it charted on the Billboard Bubbling Under Hot 100 Singles chart at No. 122.

== Rolling Stones version ==
The Rolling Stones' version was recorded in December 1965 during the Aftermath sessions, and released first in the United States on the 1967 album Flowers. The song was released in Great Britain in 1969 on the greatest hits album Through the Past, Darkly (Big Hits Vol. 2). The group did not release it as a single.

It is included on the 1972 compilation More Hot Rocks (Big Hits & Fazed Cookies), but as with so much Stones material from 1967, the band has never performed “Sittin' on a Fence” live. Towards the end of the acoustically driven song, a harpsichord can be heard. (Note: It is unclear who played the harpsichord on this song, as sources disagree. Some (e.g. Babiuk, Margotin) say it was Jack Nitzsche, Connelly says Brian Jones, and others leave it uncertain (e.g. Time is on Our Side, Thompson))

=== Personnel ===
The Rolling Stones

- Mick Jagger – vocals
- Keith Richards – backing vocals, acoustic guitar (lead and rhythm)
- Bill Wyman – bass
- Charlie Watts or Brian Jones – tambourine

Additional musician

- Jack Nitzsche – harpsichord

== Additional Sources ==
- Babiuk, Andy; Prevost, Greg (2013). Rolling Stones Gear: All the Stones' Instruments from Stage to Studio. Milwaukee: Backbeat Books. ISBN 978-1-61713-092-2.
- Margotin, Philippe; Guesdon, Jean-Michel (2016). The Rolling Stones All the Songs: The Story Behind Every Track. New York: Black Dog & Leventhal Publishers. ISBN 978-0-316-31774-0.
- "Sittin' on a Fence". Time is on Our Side.
- Connelly, Jim (February 16, 2021). "Certain Songs #2035: The Rolling Stones – "Sittin' on a Fence"". Medialoper.
- Thompson, Peg (June 29, 2023). "Use of Harpsichord in Popular Music: Part 2: The 1960s". Music. Life. Creativity.
- Margotin, Philippe; Guesdon, Jean-Michel (2022). The Rolling Stones All the Songs Expanded Edition: The Story Behind Every Track. Running Press. ISBN 9780762479849.
