= Connection (Rolling Stones song) =

Song by the Rolling Stones

from the album Between the Buttons
- Released: 20 January 1967 (UK); 11 February 1967 (US)
- Recorded: 3–11 August 1966
- Genre: Country rock
- Length: 2:08
- Label: Decca/ABKCO (UK); London/ABKCO (US)
- Songwriter: Jagger–Richards
- Producer: Andrew Loog Oldham

Between the Buttons track listing
- 12 tracks Side one: 1. "Yesterday's Papers"; 2. "My Obsession"; 3. "Back Street Girl"; 4. "Connection"; 5. "She Smiled Sweetly"; 6. "Cool, Calm & Collected"; Side two: 7. "All Sold Out"; 8. "Please Go Home"; 9. "Who's Been Sleeping Here?"; 10. "Complicated"; 11. "Miss Amanda Jones"; 12. "Something Happened to Me Yesterday"

"Connection" is a song by the English rock band the Rolling Stones, featured on their 1967 album Between the Buttons. It was written by Mick Jagger and Keith Richards (but mostly Richards), features vocals by both and is said to be about the long hours the band spent in airports. The lyrics contain much rhyming based on the word connection. The lyrics also reflect the pressures the band was under by 1967:

My bags they get a very close inspection, I wonder why it is that they suspect 'em, They're dying to add me to their collection, And I don't know, If they'll let me go

The song was written before Jagger, Richards and fellow Rolling Stone Brian Jones were arrested by the police for drugs.

Although never released as a single, it has been a popular live song. The song itself is built on a very simple chord progression, a repetitive drum pattern, Chuck Berry-like lead guitar from Richards, the piano of Jack Nitzsche, tambourine and organ pedals by multi-instrumentalist Jones, and bass by Wyman. Jagger, Jones and Wyman later overdubbed handclaps. Jagger said in 1967, "That's me beating my hands on the bass drum."

== Personnel ==
According to authors Philippe Margotin and Jean-Michel Guesdon:

The Rolling Stones

- Mick Jagger – harmony vocal, tambourine, bass drum
- Keith Richards – lead vocal, lead guitar, bass
- Charlie Watts – snare drum
- Unidentified musicians (played by the Rolling Stones) – handclaps

Additional musician

- Jack Nitzsche – piano, organ pedals

== Performances ==
The song was performed by Richards during his 1988 solo tour and during shows on the Stones' 1995 leg of the Voodoo Lounge Tour and the 2006 A Bigger Bang Tour throughout North America. "Connection" is also featured in the 2008 Martin Scorsese film Shine a Light and on the accompanying soundtrack album.

== Cover versions ==
"Connection" has been covered by American rock and roll band The Connection, on their album Let It Rock, Marble Phrogg (on their 1968 self-titled album), Ramblin' Jack Elliott (on his 1968 debut album for Reprise Records Young Brigham), Montrose (on their 1974 album Paper Money with Sammy Hagar on vocals), Arlo Guthrie (on his 1976 album Amigo), Eddie and the Subtitles (on their 1983 album Dead Drunks Don't Dance) and Everclear. In December 2024, Susanna Hoffs and Elvis Costello collaborated on a version to celebrate Keith Richards' 81st birthday.

This song was performed many times by the New Riders of the Purple Sage, with Jerry Garcia and Marmaduke Dawson singing.
