= Something Happened to Me Yesterday =

Song by the Rolling Stones

from the album Between the Buttons
- Released: 20 January 1967 (UK); 11 February 1967 (US)
- Recorded: 3–11 August 1966
- Genre: Rock; music hall; trad jazz; country folk
- Length: 4:55
- Label: Decca/ABKCO (UK); London/ABKCO (US)
- Songwriters: Mick Jagger, Keith Richards
- Producer: Andrew Loog Oldham

Between the Buttons track listing
- 12 tracks Side one: 1. "Yesterday's Papers"; 2. "My Obsession"; 3. "Back Street Girl"; 4. "Connection"; 5. "She Smiled Sweetly"; 6. "Cool, Calm & Collected"; Side two: 7. "All Sold Out"; 8. "Please Go Home"; 9. "Who's Been Sleeping Here?"; 10. "Complicated"; 11. "Miss Amanda Jones"; 12. "Something Happened to Me Yesterday"

"Something Happened to Me Yesterday" is the closing track of the Rolling Stones' 1967 album Between the Buttons.

Written by Mick Jagger and Keith Richards and recorded in August and November 1966, "Something Happened to Me Yesterday" is the first officially released Rolling Stones track to feature Richards on separate lead vocal. Jagger sings the verses, while Richards sings the chorus. Richards plays electric and acoustic guitars; Charlie Watts is on drums and Bill Wyman on bass; Brian Jones whistles and plays trumpet, trombone and tuba; Jack Nitzsche plays piano; and the Mike Leander Orchestra performs the brass section.

At the time of the song's release, Jagger said: "I leave it to the individual imagination as to what happened." Matthew Greenwald calls it "one [of] the most accurate songs about LSD".

The song ends with a spoken passage by Jagger: "Well, thank you very much, and now I think it's time for us all to go. So, from all of us to all of you, not forgetting the boys in the band and our producer Reg Thorpe, we'd like to say 'God bless.' So, if you're out tonight, don't forget: if you're on your bike, wear white. Evening, all." Jagger has said (plainly facetiously) that this passage is "something I remember hearing on the BBC as the bombs dropped". However, this sort of homily was typically rendered at the end of an episode of the early police procedural Dixon of Dock Green by PC Dixon, an old school bobby.

== Personnel ==
According to authors Philippe Margotin and Jean-Michel Guesdon:

The Rolling Stones

- Mick Jagger – vocals (verses)
- Keith Richards – vocals (chorus), acoustic guitar, electric rhythm guitar, bass
- Brian Jones – trumpet, trombone, tuba, whistles
- Bill Wyman – bass guitar
- Charlie Watts – drums

Additional musicians

- Jack Nitzsche – piano
- Unidentified session musicians – tuba, clarinet, trumpet, trombone, violin
