= No Expectations =

- US picture sleeve (reverse)

Single by the Rolling Stones

from the album Beggars Banquet
- A-side: "Street Fighting Man"
- Released: 30 August 1968
- Recorded: May 1968
- Genre: Blues; country blues
- Length: 3:55
- Label: London
- Songwriter: Mick Jagger/Keith Richards
- Producer: Jimmy Miller

The Rolling Stones US singles chronology
"Jumpin' Jack Flash" (1968)	"Street Fighting Man" / "No Expectations" (1968)	"Honky Tonk Women" (1969)

"No Expectations" is a song by the English rock band the Rolling Stones featured on their 1968 album Beggars Banquet. It was first released as the B-side of the "Street Fighting Man" single in August 1968. The song was recorded in May 1968. Brian Jones' acoustic slide guitar on the recording represents one of his last major contributions before leaving the band.

== Inspiration and recording ==
This slow ballad was written by Mick Jagger and Keith Richards. Bill Janovitz says, "The loneliness expressed in the song is palpable; all about being left behind, the song is certainly a tribute in musical and lyrical tone to such Robert Johnson blues songs as "Love in Vain" – a favourite cover of the Stones – referencing such images as a train leaving the station."

Jagger said in a 1995 interview in Rolling Stone, "That's Brian playing [the slide guitar]. We were sitting around in a circle on the floor, singing and playing, recording with open mikes. That was the last time I remember Brian really being totally involved in something that was really worth doing". Accompanying Jones is Richards on acoustic rhythm guitar. Janovitz remarked that Richards "play[s] the same open-tuned rhythm he would later use on 'You Can't Always Get What You Want', also contributing to that lonely ambience". The song is also noted for its simple claves-kept beat by Charlie Watts and Nicky Hopkins's "building single-chord organ" and ornamental turns on piano.

== Personnel ==
- Mick Jagger – lead vocals
- Keith Richards – acoustic rhythm guitar
- Brian Jones – acoustic slide guitar
- Bill Wyman – bass guitar
- Charlie Watts – claves
- Nicky Hopkins – piano, Farfisa organ

== Critical reception ==
Jim Beviglia ranked "No Expectations" the 51st best Rolling Stones song in Counting Down the Rolling Stones: Their 100 Finest Songs. Complex.com praised its "mystical, evocative lyrics" and ranked it 25th in its Top 50 Rolling Stones songs. Rolling Stone ranked it 39th in its countdown of the band's top 100 songs, calling it "an early, vital result of the Stones turning to rock's deeper roots."

Classic Rock History critic Matthew Pollard rated "No Expectations" as the Rolling Stones' 8th best deep cut, calling it "the Rolling Stones at their most vulnerable."

== Performances ==
The song's first live performance was filmed for The Rolling Stones Rock and Roll Circus, which documents Jones' last live performance with the band. The band has since rarely played the song live. The second, and most notable performance, was at the Hyde Park free concert on 5 July 1969, which was held as a memorial to Jones, who died two days before. The third live performance was at the 18 January 1973, benefit concert at the Los Angeles Forum for victims of the 23 December 1972, earthquake in Nicaragua.

The Stones did not play it live again until 28 August 1994, in Cleveland, Ohio. On the 2002/03 "Licks" tour, they played it 11 times in total, and most recently they played it on their 50th anniversary tour in San Jose, California, on 8 May 2013, with Ronnie Wood playing the slide guitar. Former Stones guitarist Mick Taylor, who replaced Jones, has also covered the song during his concerts, including his 2012 performances at New York City's Iridium Jazz Club. "No Expectations" is also included on the 1972 Stones compilation album More Hot Rocks (Big Hits & Fazed Cookies). The single version is available on Singles Collection: The London Years.

== Cover versions ==
- Joan Baez recorded the song on her 1970 album One Day at a Time.
- American banjo player Bill Keith recorded the song on his 1976 album Something Auld, Something Newgrass, Something Borrowed, Something Bluegrass.
- Johnny Cash recorded the song on his 1978 album Gone Girl.
- Waylon Jennings recorded the song on his 1998 album Closing In on the Fire.
- American progressive bluegrass band Yonder Mountain String Band frequently covered the song. After the death of founding Yonder Mountain member Jeff Austin in 2019, their version of the song would come to be viewed as a tribute and memorial to him. Fellow progressive bluegrass band Greensky Bluegrass added it to their repertoire after Austin's death.
- The Kitchen Dwellers have played it several times over the last few years.
- John Hartford on his album Gum Tree Canoe 1984
