= Let's Spend the Night Together =

1967 single by the Rolling Stones

- US picture sleeve

Single by the Rolling Stones

from the album Between the Buttons (US release)
- A-side: "Ruby Tuesday" (double A-side)
- Released: 13 January 1967
- Recorded: August 1966
- Studio: RCA Victor (Hollywood, California)
- Genre: Rock
- Length: 3:29
- Label: Decca (UK); London (US)
- Songwriter: Jagger/Richards
- Producer: Andrew Loog Oldham

The Rolling Stones singles chronology
"Have You Seen Your Mother, Baby, Standing in the Shadow?" (1966)	"Let's Spend the Night Together" / "Ruby Tuesday" (1967)	"We Love You" (1967)

Audio
- "Let's Spend the Night Together" on YouTube

"Let's Spend the Night Together" is a song written by Mick Jagger and Keith Richards, and originally released by the Rolling Stones as a double A-sided single together with "Ruby Tuesday" in January 1967. It also appears as the opening track on the American version of their album Between the Buttons. The song has been covered by various artists, including David Bowie in 1973.

== Recording ==
The song was recorded in August 1966 at the RCA Studios in Hollywood, California, where the group recorded most of their 1965–1966 hits. Recording engineer Glyn Johns recounts that while mixing "Let's Spend the Night Together", Andrew Loog Oldham was trying to get a certain sound by clicking his fingers. Two policemen showed up, stating that the front door was open and that they were checking to see if everything was all right. At first, Oldham asked them to hold his earphones while he snapped his fingers but then Johns said they needed a more wooden sound. The policemen suggested their truncheons and Oldham took the truncheons into the studio to record the claves-like sound that can be heard during the quiet break at one minute 40 seconds into the song.

== Original release ==
Released in the United Kingdom as a single on 13 January 1967, "Let's Spend the Night Together" reached number three on the UK Singles Chart as a double A-side with "Ruby Tuesday". In the United States, the single was released in January and became the opening track of the American edition of the Stones' album Between the Buttons. Both songs entered the Billboard Hot 100 singles chart on 21 January. However, by 4 March, "Ruby Tuesday" reached number one, while "Let's Spend the Night Together" stalled at number 55. Due to the sexually charged nature of the lyrics, "Let's Spend the Night Together" received less airplay in the US. In the Cash Box chart, which was based on sales only, the song reached number 28. In other countries worldwide, both sides of the single charted separately. In Ireland for example, "Ruby Tuesday" peaked at number six, while "Let's Spend The Night Together" charted separately at number 14, as Ireland's national broadcaster, RTÉ, considered "Ruby Tuesday" to be more suitable for radio airplay.

The song features piano by Rolling Stones contributor Jack Nitzsche, organ by Brian Jones, drums by Charlie Watts, piano, electric guitar and bass by Richards, lead vocals by Jagger and backing vocals from both Jagger and Richards. Usual bassist Bill Wyman does not appear on the recording.

Cash Box said the single is a "strong, thumping, rock venture marked by groovey harmonies".

On their The Ed Sullivan Show appearance of 15 January 1967, the band was initially refused permission to perform the number. Sullivan himself even told Jagger, "Either the song goes or you go". A compromise was reached to substitute the words "let's spend some time together" in place of "let's spend the night together"; Jagger agreed to change the lyrics but ostentatiously rolled his eyes at the TV camera while singing them, as did bassist Bill Wyman and pianist Brian Jones. As a result of this incident, Sullivan announced that the Rolling Stones would be banned from performing on his show again. However, the Stones did appear on the show again and performed three songs on 23 November 1969.

The song proved to be accessible to a variety of different artists including Tina Turner, Muddy Waters, Claudine Longet, Smith, Jerry Garcia, Charo with The Salsoul Orchestra, 1980s hard rock band Keel, and even The London Orchestral Symphony.

In April 2006, for their first-ever performance in China, authorities prohibited the group from performing the song due to its "suggestive lyrics".

=== Charts ===
Chart (1967)	Peak position
Austria (Ö3 Austria Top 40)	3
Belgium (Ultratop 50 Flanders)	7
Finland (Soumen Virallinen)	14
Germany (GfK)	1
Ireland (IRMA)	14
Italy (Musica e dischi)	8
Norway (VG-lista)	2
Sweden (Kvällstoppen)	6
Sweden (Tio i Topp)	4
UK Singles (Official Charts)	3
US Billboard Hot 100	55
US Cash Box Top 100	28

== Sales ==
Sales for Let's Spend the Night Together
Region	Sales
Italy	150,000

=== Other releases ===
"Let's Spend the Night Together" was released on the US edition of the Stones' 1967 studio album Between the Buttons and on the following compilation albums:

- Flowers (1967)
- Through the Past, Darkly (Big Hits Vol. 2) (1969)
- Hot Rocks 1964–1971 (1971)
- Rolled Gold: The Very Best of the Rolling Stones (1975)
- 30 Greatest Hits (1977)
- Singles Collection: The London Years (1989)
- Forty Licks (2002)
- Singles 1965–1967 (2004)
- GRRR! (2012)
- A live version appears on Still Life (1982).

== Personnel ==
According to authors Philippe Margotin and Jean-Michel Guesdon, except where noted:

The Rolling Stones

- Mick Jagger – vocals
- Keith Richards – rhythm guitar, bass, piano, backing vocals
- Brian Jones – organ
- Charlie Watts – drums

Additional personnel and production

- Jack Nitzsche – piano
- Andrew Loog Oldham – producer, truncheons
- Glyn Johns – sound engineer
- Eddie Kramer – assistant sound engineer

== David Bowie version ==
"Let's Spend the Night Together"

Single by David Bowie

from the album Aladdin Sane
- B-side: "Lady Grinning Soul"
- Released: July 1973
- Recorded: December 1972 or January 1973
- Studio: RCA, New York City, or Trident, London
- Genre: Glam rock
- Length: 3:03
- Label: RCA
- Songwriter: Jagger/Richards
- Producers: Ken Scott; David Bowie

David Bowie singles chronology
"Time" (1973)	"Let's Spend the Night Together" (1973)	"Life on Mars?" (1973)

David Bowie recorded a glam rock version of "Let's Spend the Night Together" for his Aladdin Sane album, released in April 1973. It was also issued as a single by RCA Records in the US, Japan, Brazil, New Zealand and Europe including the Netherlands, Italy, France, Greece and Sweden. It was a Dutch Single Top 100 hit, peaking at number 19. The song also peaked at number 21 on the Dutch Top 40.

Bowie's rendition featured pulsating synthesiser effects. The singer added his own words as part of the finale:

They said we were too young
Our kind of love was no fun
But our love comes from above
Let's make ... love

Author Nicholas Pegg describes the recording as "faster and raunchier" than the Stones' performance with "a fresh, futuristic sheen", while NME editors Roy Carr and Charles Shaar Murray considered Bowie to have performed "the unprecedented feat of beating the Stones on one of their own songs", remarking on the track's "polymorphous perversity" and "furious, coked-up drive". However, Rolling Stone's contemporary review found the Bowie version "campy, butch, brittle and unsatisfying".

In addition to its appearance on Aladdin Sane, Bowie's version of "Let's Spend the Night Together" was included on the following compilations:

- The Best of David Bowie (Japan 1974)
- The Best of David Bowie 1969/1974 (1997)
- A live version recorded by Bowie at the Hammersmith Odeon, London, on 3 July 1973 appears on the album Ziggy Stardust: The Motion Picture (1983).

=== Personnel ===
According to biographer Chris O'Leary:

- David Bowie – lead vocal, ARP synthesiser
- Mick Ronson – lead and rhythm guitar, backing vocal
- Trevor Bolder – bass
- Mick Woodmansey – drums
- Mike Garson – piano

Production

- David Bowie – producer
- Ken Scott – producer, engineer

== See also ==
- List of songs banned by the BBC
