= Beggars Banquet =

1968 studio album by the Rolling Stones

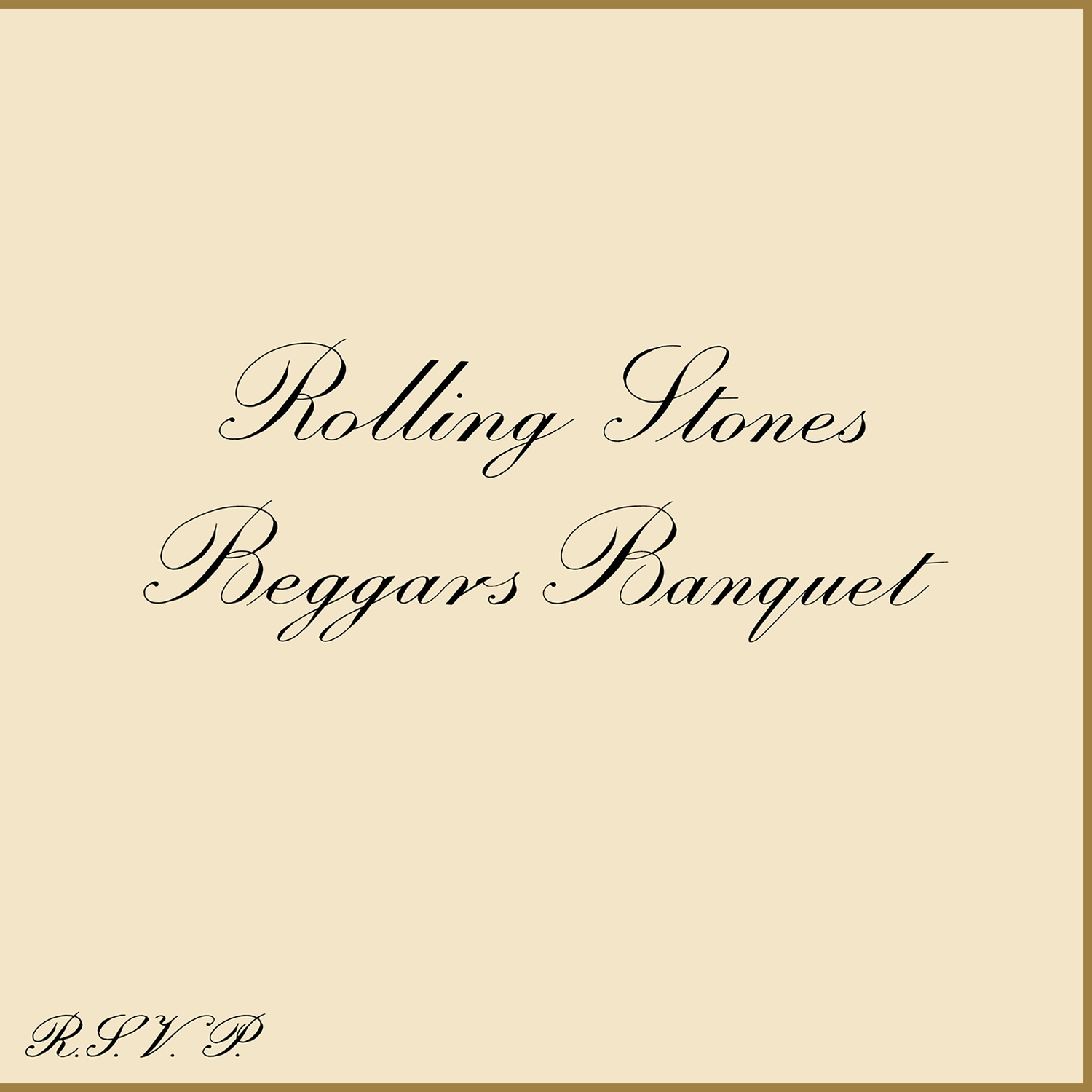
- Original cover

Studio album by the Rolling Stones
- Released: 6 December 1968
- Recorded: 17 March – 25 July 1968
- Studios: Olympic, London
- Genres: Roots rock; country blues; hard rock
- Length: 39:44
- Labels: Decca (UK); London (US)
- Producer: Jimmy Miller

The Rolling Stones chronology
Their Satanic Majesties Request (1967)	Beggars Banquet (1968)	Through the Past, Darkly (Big Hits Vol. 2) (1969)

The Rolling Stones studio album chronology
Their Satanic Majesties Request (1967)	Beggars Banquet (1968)	Let It Bleed (1969)

Alternate cover
- The "toilet" cover, rejected for the original LP but used on subsequent reissues

Singles from Beggars Banquet
- 1. "Street Fighting Man" / "No Expectations" Released: 30 August 1968 (US)

Beggars Banquet is the seventh studio album by the English rock band the Rolling Stones, released on 6 December 1968 by Decca Records in the United Kingdom and London Records in the United States. It was the first Rolling Stones album produced by Jimmy Miller, whose production work formed a key aspect of the Rolling Stones' sound throughout the late 1960s and early 1970s.

Brian Jones, the band's co-founder and early leader, had become increasingly unreliable in the studio due to his drug use, and it was the last Rolling Stones album to be released during his lifetime, though he also contributed to two songs on their next album Let It Bleed, which was released after his death (Jones also contributed to the group's hit song "Jumpin' Jack Flash", which was part of the same sessions, and released in May 1968). Nearly all rhythm and lead guitar parts were recorded by Keith Richards, the Rolling Stones' other guitarist and the primary songwriting partner of their lead singer Mick Jagger; together the two wrote all but one of the tracks on the album. Rounding out the instrumentation were bassist Bill Wyman and drummer Charlie Watts, though all members contributed on a variety of instruments. As with most albums of the period, frequent collaborator Nicky Hopkins played piano on many of the tracks.

Beggars Banquet marked a change in direction for the band following the psychedelic pop of their previous two albums, Between the Buttons and Their Satanic Majesties Request. Styles such as roots rock and a return to the blues rock sound that had marked early Stones recordings dominate the record, and the album is among the most instrumentally experimental of the band's career, as they use Latin beats and instruments like the claves alongside South Asian sounds from the tanpura, tabla and shehnai, and African music-influenced conga rhythms.

Beggars Banquet was a top-ten album in many markets, including a number 5 position in the US—where it has been certified platinum—and a number 3 position in the band's native UK. It received a highly favourable response from music critics, who deemed it a return to form. While the album lacked a major hit single at the time of its release, songs such as "Sympathy for the Devil" and "Street Fighting Man" (US Billboard number 48) became rock radio staples for decades to come. The album has appeared on many lists of the greatest albums of all time, including by Rolling Stone, and it was inducted into the Grammy Hall of Fame in 1999.

== Recording and production ==
Glyn Johns, the album's recording engineer and a longtime collaborator of the band, said that Beggars Banquet signalled "the Rolling Stones' coming of age. ... I think that the material was far better than anything they'd ever done before. The whole mood of the record was far stronger to me musically." Producer Jimmy Miller described guitarist Keith Richards as "a real workhorse" while recording the album, mostly due to the infrequent presence of Brian Jones. When he did show up at the sessions, Jones behaved erratically due to his drug use and emotional problems. Miller said that Jones would "show up occasionally when he was in the mood to play, and he could never really be relied on:

When he would show up at a session—let's say he had just bought a sitar that day, he'd feel like playing it, so he'd look in his calendar to see if the Stones were in. Now he may have missed the previous four sessions. We'd be doing let's say, a blues thing. He'd walk in with a sitar, which was totally irrelevant to what we were doing, and want to play it. I used to try to accommodate him. I would isolate him, put him in a booth and not record him onto any track that we really needed. And the others, particularly Mick and Keith, would often say to me, 'Just tell him to piss off and get the hell out of here'.

Nevertheless, Jones contributed to eight tracks on the album, playing sitar and tanpura on "Street Fighting Man", acoustic slide guitar on "No Expectations", acoustic rhythm guitar and harmonica on "Parachute Woman", "Dear Doctor" and "Prodigal Son", acoustic guitar and backing vocals on "Sympathy for the Devil", and Mellotron on "Jigsaw Puzzle" and "Stray Cat Blues". In a television interview, Mick Jagger recalled that Jones' slide guitar performance on "No Expectations" was the last time he contributed something "of significance" to the band. Other than Jones, the principal band members appeared extensively, with Richards providing nearly all of the lead and rhythm guitar work, as well as playing bass on three others, in the place of Bill Wyman, who appears on the rest. Drummer Charlie Watts plays the drum kit on all but two tracks, as well as other percussion on the tracks that do not feature a full drum kit. Additional parts were played by keyboardist and frequent Rolling Stones collaborator Nicky Hopkins and percussionist Rocky Dijon, among others.

The basic track of "Street Fighting Man" was recorded on an early Philips cassette deck at London's Olympic Sound Studios, where Richards played a Gibson Hummingbird acoustic guitar, and Watts played on an antique, portable practice drum kit. "Prodigal Son", a cover of Robert Wilkins's Biblical blues song, was originally credited as a Jagger/Richards composition on initial pressings of the album, but was subsequently corrected on later pressings.

Celebrating the completion of the album, Jagger held a party at Vesuvio's nightclub in Central London. Paul McCartney attended with an acetate copy of "Hey Jude". The song upstaged Beggars Banquet and, in author John Winn's description, "reportedly ruin[ed]" the party.

== Packaging ==
According to Keith Richards, the album's title was thought up by British art dealer Christopher Gibbs. The album's original front and back cover art, photographs by Barry Feinstein depicting a bathroom wall covered with graffiti, was rejected by the band's record company, which delayed the album's release for months. Feinstein's photographs were later featured though on most vinyl, compact disc and cassette tape reissues of the album. On 7 June 1968, a photoshoot for the album's gatefold, with photographer Michael Joseph, was held at Sarum Chase, a mansion in Hampstead, London. Previously unseen images from the shoot were exhibited at the Blink Gallery in London in November and December 2008.

== Release and promotion ==
Beggars Banquet was first released in the United Kingdom by Decca Records on 6 December 1968, and in the United States by London Records the following day. Like the band's previous album, it reached number three on the UK Albums Chart, but remained on the chart for fewer weeks. The album peaked at number five on the Billboard 200.

On 11–12 December 1968 the band filmed a television extravaganza titled The Rolling Stones Rock and Roll Circus featuring John Lennon, Eric Clapton, the Who, Jethro Tull and Marianne Faithfull among the musical guests. One of the original aims of the project was to promote Beggars Banquet, but the film was shelved by the Rolling Stones until 1996, when their former manager, Allen Klein, gave it an official release.

== Critical reception ==
Beggars Banquet received a highly favourable response from music critics, who considered it a return to form for the Stones. Author Stephen Davis writes of its impact: "[The album was] a sharp reflection of the convulsive psychic currents coursing through the Western world. Nothing else captured the youthful spirit of Europe in 1968 like Beggars Banquet."

According to music journalist Anthony DeCurtis, the "political correctness" of "Street Fighting Man", particularly the lyrics "What can a poor boy do/'Cept sing in a rock and roll band", sparked intense debate in the underground media. In the description of author and critic Ian MacDonald, French director Jean-Luc Godard's filming of the sessions for "Sympathy for the Devil" contributed to the band's image as "Left Bank heroes of the European Maoist underground", with the song's "Luciferian iconoclasm" interpreted as a political message.

Time described the Stones as "England's most subversive roisterers since Fagin's gang in Oliver Twist" and added: "In keeping with a widespread mood in the pop world, Beggars Banquet turns back to the raw vitality of Negro R&B and the authentic simplicity of country music." Jann Wenner of Rolling Stone considered that the band's regeneration marked the return of rock'n'roll, while the Chicago Sun-Times declared: "The Stones have unleashed their rawest, rudest, most arrogant, most savage record yet. And it's beautiful."

Less impressed, the writer of Melody Maker's initial review dismissed Beggars Banquet as "mediocre" and said that, since "The Stones are Mick Jagger", it was only the singer's "remarkable recording presence that makes this LP". Geoffrey Cannon of The Guardian found that the album "demonstrates [the group's] primal power at its greatest strength" and wrote admiringly of Jagger's ability to fully engage the listener on "Sympathy for the Devil", saying: "We feel horror because, at full volume, he makes us ride his carrier wave with him, experience his sensations, and awaken us to ours." In his ballot for Jazz & Pop magazine's annual critics poll, Robert Christgau ranked it as the third-best album of the year, and "Salt of the Earth" the best pop song of the year. In April 1969, for Esquire, he wrote that Beggars Banquet is "unflawed and lacking something", in contrast to the Beatles' latest self-titled album, which "is flawed and great anyway".

=== Reappraisal ===
Professional ratings
Retrospective professional reviews
Aggregate scores
Source	Rating
Metacritic	87/100 (50th anniversary)
Review scores
Source	Rating
AllMusic	5/5 stars
And It Don't Stop	A
Boston Herald	4/4 stars
Encyclopedia of Popular Music	5/5 stars
Entertainment Weekly	A
The Great Rock Discography	10/10
MusicHound Rock	4.5/5
NME	8/10
Rolling Stone	5/5 stars
The Rolling Stone Album Guide	5/5 stars

In a retrospective review for Wondering Sound, Ben Fong-Torres called Beggars Banquet "an album flush with masterful and growling instant classics", and said that it "responds more to the chaos of '68 and to themselves than to any fellow artists ... the mood is one of dissolution and resignation, in the guise of a voice of an ambivalent authority." Colin Larkin, in his Encyclopedia of Popular Music (2006), viewed the album as "a return to strength" which included "the socio-political 'Street Fighting Man' and the brilliantly macabre 'Sympathy for the Devil', in which Jagger's seductive vocal was backed by hypnotic Afro-rhythms and dervish yelps". Writing for MusicHound in 1999, Greg Kot opined that the same two songs were the "weakest cuts", adding: "Otherwise, the disc is a tour de force of acoustic-tinged savagery and slumming sexuality, particularly the gleefully flippant 'Stray Cat Blues.'" Larry Katz from the Boston Herald called Beggars Banquet "both a return to basics and leap forward".

In his 1997 review for Rolling Stone, DeCurtis said the album was "filled with distinctive and original touches", and remarked on its legacy: "For the album, the Stones had gone to great lengths to toughen their sound and banish the haze of psychedelia, and in doing so, they launched a five-year period in which they would produce their very greatest records." Author Martin C. Strong similarly considers Beggars Banquet to be the first album in the band's "staggering burst of creativity" over 1968–72 that ultimately comprised four of the best rock albums of all time. Writing in 2007, Daryl Easlea of BBC Music said that, although in places it fails to maintain the quality of its opening song, Beggars Banquet represented the Rolling Stones at their sharpest.

Beggars Banquet has appeared on professional listings of the greatest albums. It was included in the "Basic Record Library" of 1950s and 1960s recordings published in Christgau's Record Guide: Rock Albums of the Seventies (1981). In 2000, it was voted number 282 in Colin Larkin's All Time Top 1000 Albums. In 2003, it was ranked at number 57 on Rolling Stone's list of the 500 greatest albums of all time, ranked at number 58 in a 2012 revised list, and ranked at number 185 in a 2020 revised list. Also in 2003, the TV network VH1 named Beggars Banquet the 67th greatest album of all time. The album is also featured in the book 1001 Albums You Must Hear Before You Die. In 1999, the album was inducted into the Grammy Hall of Fame.

== Reissues ==
In August 2002, ABKCO Records reissued Beggars Banquet as a newly remastered LP and SACD/CD hybrid disk. This release corrected a flaw in the original album by restoring each song to its proper, slightly faster speed. Due to an error in the mastering, Beggars Banquet was heard for over thirty years at a slower speed than it was recorded. This had the effect of altering not only the tempo of each song, but the song's key as well. These differences were subtle but important, and the remastered version is about 30 seconds shorter than the original release.

Also in 2002 the Russian label CD-Maximum unofficially released the limited edition Beggars Banquet + 7 Bonus, which was also bootlegged on a German counterfeit-DECCA label as Beggars Banquet (the Mono Beggars).

It was released once again in 2010 by Universal Music Enterprises in a Japanese-only SHM-SACDversion and on 24 November 2010 ABKCO Records released a SHM-CD version.

On 28 May 2013 ABKCO Records reissued the LP on vinyl.

In 2018, the album was reissued for its 50th anniversary.

Record Store Day Edition appeared on the British market on Saturday, 22 April 2023.

== Track listing ==
All tracks are written by Mick Jagger and Keith Richards, except "Prodigal Son" by Robert Wilkins.

Side one
No.	Title	Length
1.	"Sympathy for the Devil"	6:18
2.	"No Expectations"	3:56
3.	"Dear Doctor"	3:28
4.	"Parachute Woman"	2:20
5.	"Jigsaw Puzzle"	6:06
Total length:		22:08

Side two
No.	Title	Length
6.	"Street Fighting Man"	3:16
7.	"Prodigal Son"	2:51
8.	"Stray Cat Blues"	4:38
9.	"Factory Girl"	2:09
10.	"Salt of the Earth"	4:48
Total length:		17:42

== Personnel ==
The Rolling Stones

- Mick Jagger – lead vocals (all tracks), hand drum (1), backing vocals (3, 6), harmonica (4), maracas (6, 8)
- Keith Richards – electric guitars (1, 4, 8), acoustic guitars (2–3, 6–7, 9–10), electric slide guitar (5, 10), bass guitar (1, 6, 8), backing vocals (1, 3, 10), opening lead vocals (10)
- Brian Jones – acoustic slide guitar (2), acoustic guitar (1, 4), harmonica (3–4, 7), Mellotron (5, 8), sitar (6), tambura (6), backing vocals (1)
- Bill Wyman – bass guitar (2, 4–5, 10), double bass (3), backing vocals (1), shekere (1)
- Charlie Watts – drums (1, 3–8, 10), claves (2), tambourine (3), tabla (9), backing vocals (1)

Additional personnel

- Nicky Hopkins – piano (1–3, 5–6, 8, 10), Mellotron, Farfisa organ (2)
- Rocky Dzidzornu – congas (1, 8–9), cowbell (1)
- Ric Grech – fiddle (9)
- Dave Mason – shehnai (6)
- Michael Cooper, Marianne Faithfull, Anita Pallenberg – backing vocals (1)
- Watts Street Gospel Choir – backing vocals (10)
- Barry Feinstein – photography and art design

== Charts ==
1968–1969 weekly chart performance for Beggars Banquet
Chart (1968–1969)	Peak position
Australian Albums (Kent Music Report)	3
Canada Top Albums/CDs (RPM)	3
Finland (The Official Finnish Charts)	4
German Albums (Offizielle Top 100)	8
Japanese Albums (Oricon)	124
Norwegian Albums (VG-lista)	2
Sweden (Kvällstoppen)	16
UK Albums (Official Charts)	3
US Billboard 200	5

2007 weekly chart performance for Beggars Banquet
Chart (2007)	Peak position
Swedish Albums (Sverigetopplistan)	43

2012 weekly chart performance for Beggars Banquet
Chart (2012)	Peak position
French Albums (SNEP)	197

2018 weekly chart performance for Beggars Banquet
Chart (2018)	Peak position
Austrian Albums (Ö3 Austria)	44
Belgian Albums (Ultratop Wallonia)	156
Swiss Albums (Schweizer Hitparade)	67

2024 weekly chart performance for Beggars Banquet
Chart (2023–2024)	Peak position
Croatian International Albums (HDU)	8
Scottish Albums (Official Charts)	17

== Certifications ==
Certifications for Beggars Banquet
Region	Certification	Certified units/sales
Australia (ARIA)	Gold	35,000^{‡}
Canada (Music Canada)	Gold	50,000^{^}
United Kingdom (BPI) release of 2006	Gold	100,000^{^}
United States (RIAA)	Platinum	1,000,000^{^}
^{^} Shipments figures based on certification alone.^{‡} Sales+streaming figures based on certification alone.

== See also ==
- Album era
