= Flowers (Rolling Stones album) =

Compilation album by the Rolling Stones
- Released: 26 June 1967
- Recorded: 3 December 1965 – 13 December 1966
- Genres: Rock; baroque pop
- Length: 38:04
- Label: London
- Producer: Andrew Loog Oldham

The Rolling Stones US chronology
Between the Buttons (1967)	Flowers (1967)	Their Satanic Majesties Request (1967)

Flowers is the second compilation album by the Rolling Stones, released in June 1967. It features material dating back to 1965, including three unreleased songs and tracks that appeared as singles or had been omitted from the American versions of Aftermath and Between the Buttons. It reached number three in the US and was certified gold.

== Contents and release ==
"Let's Spend the Night Together" and "Ruby Tuesday" had just appeared on the US version of Between the Buttons five months prior, which led to some criticism over their selection. Three of the songs had never been released: "My Girl", "Ride On, Baby" and "Sittin' on a Fence", the first of which was recorded in May 1965 during the sessions for "(I Can't Get No) Satisfaction", and the other two of which were recorded in December 1965 during the first lot of Aftermath sessions.

The title is reflected in the album's cover, with flower stems underneath the portrait of each of the band members. Bassist Bill Wyman claims that Mick Jagger and Keith Richards deliberately arranged the stem of Brian Jones's flower so that it had no leaves, as a prank. The portraits are from the British version of Aftermath.

Flowers reached number three in the US during the late summer of 1967 and was certified gold. In August 2002 it was remastered and reissued on CD and SACD digipak by ABKCO Records.

== Critical reception ==
Professional ratings
Retrospective reviews
Review scores
Source	Rating
AllMusic	4.5/5 stars
The Rolling Stone Album Guide	5/5 stars
Tom Hull	A−

Because of its assorted compilation, Flowers was originally disregarded by some music critics as a promotional ploy aimed at American listeners. Critic Robert Christgau, on the other hand, suggested that managers Andrew Loog Oldham and Lou Adler released the album as a "potshot at Sergeant Pepper itself, as if to say, 'Come off this bullshit, boys. You're only in it for the money." He wrote in 1970 in The Village Voice:

With its dumb cover art (as bad as the Mainstream Big Brother jacket, only bad on purpose), its cheap song selection (half repeated from previous albums), and its incongruous use of the already meaningless 'flower music' idea [...] the tendency was to half-dismiss it as another London Records exploitation. Only later did we realize how strong and unflowery the new songs were.

In a retrospective review for AllMusic, Richie Unterberger gave Flowers four-and-a-half out of five stars and said that the music it compiles is exceptional enough not to be dismissed as a marketing "rip-off": "There's some outstanding material you can't get anywhere else, and the album as a whole plays very well from end to end." Tom Moon gave it five stars in The Rolling Stone Album Guide (2004) and wrote that "it holds together as one of the Stones' best records, a concept album about the social scene that gathers around five rich young men with an appetite for sex, drugs, and gossip."

Many critics and fans do not consider Flowers to be a proper studio album as some of the tracks had been released on albums in the US before. The issue of different tracks on UK and US album versions was common in the 1960s and plagued many bands including the Beatles. The Rolling Stones' next studio album, Their Satanic Majesties Request, and all subsequent studio albums have the same tracks on them regardless of where it was released.

== Track listing ==
All songs by Mick Jagger and Keith Richards, except "My Girl" by Smokey Robinson and Ronald White.

Side one
No.	Title	Original release	Length
1.	"Ruby Tuesday"	January 1967 single, also on Between the Buttons (US)	3:17
2.	"Have You Seen Your Mother, Baby, Standing in the Shadow?"	September 1966 single	2:34
3.	"Let's Spend the Night Together"	January 1967 single, also on Between the Buttons (US)	3:36
4.	"Lady Jane"	Aftermath (1966)	3:08
5.	"Out of Time"	Abridged alternate mix of Aftermath (UK, 1966) version	3:41
6.	"My Girl"	Recorded May 1965, with strings added in autumn 1966	2:38
Total length:			19:54

Side two
No.	Title	Original release	Length
1.	"Back Street Girl"	Between the Buttons (UK)	3:26
2.	"Please Go Home"	Between the Buttons (UK)	3:17
3.	"Mother's Little Helper"	Aftermath (UK); US single July 1966	2:46
4.	"Take It or Leave It"	Aftermath (UK)	2:46
5.	"Ride On, Baby"	Recorded during the 1965 sessions for Aftermath	2:52
6.	"Sittin' on a Fence"	Recorded during the 1965 sessions for Aftermath	3:03
Total length:			18:10

== Personnel ==
Credits are from the original 1967 US LP liner notes, the 2002 ABKCO CD booklet (where applicable), and Philippe Margotin & Jean-Michel Guesdon's All the Songs, except where noted otherwise.

The Rolling Stones

- Mick Jagger – lead vocals, backing vocals, tambourine, percussion
- Keith Richards – electric guitar, acoustic guitar, backing vocals; bass guitar ("Let's Spend the Night Together", "Have You Seen Your Mother, Baby, Standing in the Shadow?"); bowed double bass ("Ruby Tuesday"); piano ("Let's Spend the Night Together")
- Brian Jones – electric guitar, acoustic guitar; organ ("Let's Spend the Night Together"); alto recorder ("Ruby Tuesday"); Appalachian dulcimer ("Lady Jane"); Mellotron ("Please Go Home"); electronic oscillator ("Please Go Home"); vibraphone ("Back Street Girl"); marimba ("Out of Time", "Ride On, Baby"); koto ("Take It or Leave It"); harpsichord ("Ride On, Baby", "Sittin' on a Fence"); autoharp ("Ride On, Baby")
- Bill Wyman – bass guitar, backing vocals; plucked double bass ("Ruby Tuesday"); bells ("Back Street Girl"); castanets ("Back Street Girl")
- Charlie Watts – drums, percussion; maracas ("Please Go Home")

Additional musicians

- Jack Nitzsche – piano ("Let's Spend the Night Together", "Have You Seen Your Mother, Baby, Standing in the Shadow?", "Ruby Tuesday"); harpsichord ("Back Street Girl")
- Ian Stewart – piano ("My Girl")
- Nick DeCaro – accordion ("Back Street Girl")

Additional personnel

- Andrew Loog Oldham – producer
- Dave Hassinger – engineering
- Glyn Johns – engineering

== Charts ==
Chart performance for Flowers
Chart (1967–68)	Peak position
Canada Top Albums/CDs (RPM)	5
Finland (The Official Finnish Charts)	5
German Albums (Offizielle Top 100)	7
Norwegian Albums (VG-lista)	3
US Billboard 200	3

== Certifications ==
Certifications for Flowers
Region	Certification	Certified units/sales
United States (RIAA)	Gold	500,000^{^}
^{^} Shipments figures based on certification alone.

== Sources ==
- Margotin, Philippe; Guesdon, Jean-Michel (2016). The Rolling Stones All the Songs: The Story Behind Every Track. New York: Black Dog & Leventhal Publishers. ISBN 978-0-316-31774-0.
