= Ruby Tuesday (song) =

1967 single by the Rolling Stones

- US picture sleeve

Single by the Rolling Stones

from the album Between the Buttons (US release)
- A-side: "Let's Spend the Night Together" (double A-side)
- Released: 13 January 1967
- Recorded: November 1966
- Studio: Olympic, London
- Genre: Baroque pop; psychedelic pop; psychedelic soul
- Length: 3:12
- Label: Decca (UK); London (North America)
- Songwriter: Jagger–Richards
- Producer: Andrew Loog Oldham

The Rolling Stones singles chronology
"Have You Seen Your Mother, Baby, Standing in the Shadow?" (1966)	"Ruby Tuesday" / "Let's Spend the Night Together" (1967)	"We Love You" (1967)

"Ruby Tuesday" is a song by the English rock band the Rolling Stones, released in January 1967. The song became the band's fourth number-one hit in the United States and reached number three in the United Kingdom as a double A-side with "Let's Spend the Night Together". The song was included in the American version of Between the Buttons (in the UK, singles were often excluded from studio albums).

Rolling Stone ranked the song number 310 on their list of the 500 Greatest Songs of All Time.

== Composition and recording ==
The Rolling Stones recorded "Ruby Tuesday" around November 1966 at Olympic Studios, during the sessions for their album Between the Buttons. (Note: Bill Wyman writes the band recorded the song on 16 November 1966. Authors Philippe Margotin and Jean-Michel Guesdon write the song's sessions took place between 16 November and 6 December 1966, while authors Andy Babiuk and Greg Prevost instead write it was 9–26 November 1966.) The song was produced by Andrew Loog Oldham. Brian Jones plays a countermelody on an alto recorder, while the double bass was played jointly by bassist Bill Wyman and guitarist Keith Richards; Wyman did the fingerings while Richards bowed the instrument.

Richards explained that the lyrics are about Linda Keith, his girlfriend in the mid-1960s:

Who could hang a name on you
When you change with every new day?
Still, I'm gonna miss you.

"That's a wonderful song," Mick Jagger told Jann Wenner in 1995. "It's just a nice melody, really. And a lovely lyric. Neither of which I wrote, but I always enjoy singing it." Wyman states in Rolling with the Stones that the lyrics were completely written by Richards with help from Jones on the musical composition. However, Marianne Faithfull recalls it differently; according to her, Jones presented an early version of this melody to the rest of the Rolling Stones. According to Victor Bockris, Richards came up with the basic track and the words and finished the song with Jones in the studio.

Cash Box described the single as a "smooth ballad ballad á là baroque".

== Release ==
"Ruby Tuesday" was released as the B-side to "Let's Spend the Night Together" in January 1967. Due to the controversial nature of the A-side's lyrics, "Ruby Tuesday" earned more airplay and ended up charting higher in the US. The song topped the American Billboard Hot 100 chart, while reaching number three in the UK's Record Retailer chart, which listed "Let's Spend The Night Together"/"Ruby Tuesday" as a double A-side.

"Ruby Tuesday" was included on the US version of the 1967 album Between the Buttons, while being left out of the British edition, as was common practice with singles in the UK at that time. That summer, the song appeared on the US compilation album Flowers. Due to its success, the song became a staple of the band's compilations, being included on Through the Past, Darkly (Big Hits Vol. 2) (1969), Hot Rocks 1964–1971 (1971), Rolled Gold (1975), and 30 Greatest Hits (1977), and, in mono, on Singles Collection: The London Years (1989).

== Personnel ==
According to authors Philippe Margotin and Jean-Michel Guesdon, except where noted:

The Rolling Stones

- Mick Jagger – vocals, tambourine
- Keith Richards – acoustic guitar, double bass (bowing)
- Brian Jones – alto recorder
- Jack Nitzsche and/or Brian Jones – piano (Note: Margotin and Guesdon write that Jones "probably" contributed harpsichord during the refrains, but offer the possibility it was a honky-tonk piano. In his autobiography, Stone Alone, Wyman writes it was piano. Authors Andy Babiuk and Greg Prevost write Jones' "main contribution" was recorder.)
- Bill Wyman – double bass (fingering), bass guitar
- Charlie Watts – drums

== Charts ==
=== Weekly charts ===
Chart (1967)	Peak position
Australia	2
Canada Top Singles (RPM)	2
Finland (Suomen Virallinen)	14
Ireland (IRMA)	6
Rhodesia (Lyons Maid)	10
South Africa (Springbok)	4
UK Singles Chart	3
US Billboard Hot 100	1
US Cash Box Top 100	1
US Record World Top 100 Pops	1

=== Year-end charts ===
Chart (1967)	Rank
Canada	5
US Billboard Hot 100	24

== Certifications ==
Region	Certification	Certified units/sales
Australia (ARIA)	Gold	35,000^{‡}
New Zealand (RMNZ)	Gold	15,000^{‡}
United Kingdom (BPI)	Silver	200,000^{‡}
United States (RIAA)	Gold	1,000,000^{^}
^{^} Shipments figures based on certification alone.^{‡} Sales+streaming figures based on certification alone.

== Live version ==
"Ruby Tuesday (live)"

Single by the Rolling Stones

from the album Flashpoint
- B-side: "Play with Fire (live)"
- Released: 24 May 1991
- Recorded: 27 February 1990
- Venue: Korakuen Dome, Tokyo
- Genre: Rock
- Length: 3:34
- Label: Rolling Stones
- Songwriter: Jagger/Richards
- Producers: Chris Kimsey; The Glimmer Twins

The Rolling Stones singles chronology
"Highwire" (1991)	"Ruby Tuesday (live)" (1991)	"Love Is Strong" (1994)

"Ruby Tuesday" was first played live on Brian Jones' last concert tour The Rolling Stones European Tour 1967. The next time was on the Steel Wheels/Urban Jungle Tour in 1989/1990. A concert rendition from this tour was featured on the band's 1991 live album Flashpoint and released as a single. This live version was recorded in Japan in 1990 and can be seen on the video release Live at the Tokyo Dome. The B-side was "Play with Fire (live)" recorded in 1989 but not included on the Flashpoint album.

A July 2013 live performance is featured on Sweet Summer Sun: Hyde Park Live.

== Melanie version ==
"Ruby Tuesday"

Single by Melanie
- B-side: "Merry Christmas"
- Released: December 1970
- Length: 4:31
- Label: Buddah
- Songwriter: Jagger/Richards

American folk and pop singer Melanie recorded "Ruby Tuesday" for her 1970 album Candles in the Rain. Her version was released as a single in the UK, where it became a Top Ten hit that year. It also reached number seven in New Zealand. She recorded a second cover version for her 1978 album Ballroom Streets.

Chart (1970–71)	Peak position
Canada RPM Top Singles	25
Ireland (IRMA)	12
New Zealand (Listener)	7
South Africa (Springbok)	10
UK (The Official Charts Company)	9
US Billboard Hot 100	52
US Cash Box Top 100	34
Australia (Kent Music Report)	70
Quebec (ADISQ)	29

== Other versions ==
- 1968: Rotary Connection, with singer Minnie Riperton, released a cover of the song on their debut album Rotary Connection.
- 1969: Oliver released a version of the song on his album Good Morning Starshine.
- 1984: Scottish rock band Nazareth cover the song on their album The Catch.
- 1989: Julian Lennon released a version of the song on the compilation album entitled The Wonder Years: Music from the Emmy Award-Winning Show & Its Era, a soundtrack for The Wonder Years TV series.
- 1991: The September When used the chorus of Ruby Tuesday in the intro and the bridge of the song Same Slave on their second album Mother I’ve Been Kissed.
- 1993: Rod Stewart recorded a version for his 1993 compilation album, Lead Vocalist, and released it as a single through Warner Bros. Records on 8 February 1993. His cover reached number 11 on the UK Singles Chart. Across the rest of Europe, the song entered the top 40 in Belgium, Iceland, Ireland, and the Netherlands. In Denmark, it became a top-10 hit, reaching number seven.
- 2006: The Corrs recorded a version for the Dreams: The Ultimate Corrs Collection compilation album with Ron Wood.

== Restaurant chain ==
Samuel E. Beall III used the title of the song when he started his restaurant chain Ruby Tuesday. The name was suggested by one of several fraternity brothers who were co-investors.
