= Back Street Girl =

Song by The Rolling Stones

from the album Between the Buttons
- Released: 20 January 1967 (UK); 26 June 1967 (US)
- Recorded: August – November 1966
- Studio: RCA, Hollywood
- Genre: Baroque pop; folk
- Length: 3:27
- Label: Decca/ABKCO (UK)
- Songwriter: Jagger–Richards
- Producer: Andrew Loog Oldham

"Back Street Girl" is a song by the English rock band the Rolling Stones, written by Mick Jagger and Keith Richards. It first appeared on the UK version of their 1967 album Between the Buttons but was not included on the US version. It was first released in the US on the 1967 album Flowers.

In their 100 Greatest Rolling Stones Songs article, Rolling Stone magazine placed "Back Street Girl" at number 85. In a 1968 interview with Rolling Stone, Jagger was asked how he felt about Between the Buttons, to which he replied, "I don't know, it just isn't any good. 'Back Street Girl' is about the only [song] I like."

The song is a waltz, which showcases Brian Jones playing vibraphone and Rolling Stones contributor Jack Nitzsche on the harpsichord. Accordion was played by Nick de Caro.

== Personnel ==
According to authors Philippe Margotin and Jean-Michel Guesdon:

The Rolling Stones

- Mick Jagger – vocals
- Keith Richards – acoustic guitar
- Brian Jones – vibraphone, keyboard (Note: Margotin and Guesdon are uncertain whether Jones participated in the recording, but suggest he may have played vibraphone, harpsichord, Mellotron or electronic organ. They also raise the possibility Jack Nitzsche played harpsichord in Jones' place.)
- Bill Wyman – bass
- Charlie Watts – bell, castanets

Additional musicians

- Nick de Caro – accordion
