= Between the Buttons =

1967 studio album by the Rolling Stones

Studio album by the Rolling Stones
- Released: 20 January 1967
- Recorded: 3 August – 13 December 1966
- Studios: RCA (Hollywood); IBC, Olympic and Pye (London)
- Genres: Pop rock; psychedelic rock; baroque pop; music hall
- Length: 38:51
- Label: Decca
- Producer: Andrew Loog Oldham

The Rolling Stones UK chronology
Big Hits (High Tide and Green Grass) (1966)	Between the Buttons (1967)	Their Satanic Majesties Request (1967)

The Rolling Stones US chronology
Got Live If You Want It! (1966)	Between the Buttons (1967)	Flowers (1967)

Singles from Between the Buttons (US)
- 1. "Ruby Tuesday" / "Let's Spend the Night Together" Released: 13 January 1967

Between the Buttons is the fifth studio album by the English rock band the Rolling Stones, released on 20 January 1967 in the UK and 23 January in the United States. Reflecting the band's brief foray into psychedelia and baroque pop balladry during the era, the album is among their most eclectic works; multi-instrumentalist Brian Jones frequently abandoned his guitar during the sessions in favour of instruments such as vibraphone, electric dulcimer, banjo, kazoo, theremin and brass. Additional keyboard contributions came from frequent contributors Ian Stewart (piano, organ), Jack Nitzsche (piano, harpsichord) and Nicky Hopkins (piano). Between the Buttons would be the band's last album produced by Andrew Loog Oldham, who had, to this point, acted as the band's manager and produced all of their albums.

As with prior albums, the American and British versions contained slightly different track listings. The American version of Between the Buttons, which replaces "Back Street Girl" and "Please Go Home" with "Let's Spend the Night Together" and "Ruby Tuesday", is on the 2003 and 2012 versions of Rolling Stone magazine's 500 Greatest Albums of All Time. Between the Buttons reached number 3 on the British album charts and number 2 on the U.S. Billboard Top LPs chart.

== Recording and background ==
On the previous album, Aftermath, Brian Jones introduced a large number of different instruments to the recording sessions, a trend he continued on this album. Jones only contributed electric guitar on one track apiece on the American release and the British version. Bill Wyman plays bass on all except three tracks (which instead feature guitarist Keith Richards on bass), and drummer Charlie Watts and lead singer Mick Jagger appear on all tracks. Piano duties were split by two session players: former Rolling Stones member Ian Stewart and frequent contributor Jack Nitzsche, although Nicky Hopkins also does keyboards.

Early sessions for the album occurred between 3 August 1966 and the 11th at Los Angeles' RCA Studios during the Rolling Stones' 1966 American Tour. David Hassinger was the engineer for the album. Several songs were worked on; the backing tracks of six songs that would appear on the album were recorded, as were those of "Let's Spend the Night Together" and "Who's Driving Your Plane?", the B-side of "Have You Seen Your Mother, Baby, Standing in the Shadow?", released as a single in late September. During this time, Brian Wilson of the Beach Boys was invited down to RCA Studios during the recording of "My Obsession," which remained one of his favourite Rolling Stones songs for the rest of his life.

The band returned to London, and sessions continued at IBC Studios from August 31 to September 3. "Have You Seen Your Mother, Baby, Standing in the Shadow?" was completed and released on 23 September before the Stones embarked on their seventh British tour, which lasted into early October and was their last UK tour until 1971.

The second block of recording sessions for Between the Buttons began on 8 November at the newly opened Olympic Sound Studios in Barnes, London, alternating between Olympic and Pye Studios until 26 November. During this time, the bulk of the album was completed, including vocal and other overdubs on the previously recorded backing tracks and mixing. "Ruby Tuesday" was also completed.

Around the same time, producer and manager Andrew Loog Oldham was also preparing the US-only live album Got Live If You Want It!, a contractual requirement from London Records that contained live performances from their recent British tour as well as studio tracks overdubbed with audience noise. After that album's release on 10 December, a final overdubbing session for Buttons was held at Olympic Studios on 13 December 1966 before Oldham took the tapes back to RCA Studios in Hollywood for final mixing and editing.

The album was recorded using four-track machines, with tracks of the initial sessions mixed down in order to free the tracks for use as overdubs. Mick Jagger felt this process lost the clarity of the songs, commenting during an interview that "we bounced it back to do overdubs so many times we lost the sound of it. [The songs] sounded so great, but later on, I was really disappointed with it." He commented further: "I don't know, it just isn't any good. 'Back Street Girl' is about the only one I like." In an interview with New Musical Express, he even called the rest of the album "more or less rubbish".

Between the Buttons would be the last album wholly produced by Oldham, with whom the Stones fell out in mid-1967 during the recording sessions for Their Satanic Majesties Request.

== Artwork ==
The photoshoot for the album cover took place in November 1966 on Primrose Hill in North London. The photographer was Gered Mankowitz, who also shot the band photos for the cover of Out of Our Heads. The shoot took place at 5:30 in the morning following an all-night recording session at Olympic Studios. Using a homemade camera filter constructed of black card, glass and Vaseline, Mankowitz created the effect of the Stones dissolving into their surroundings. The goal of the shoot was, in Mankowitz's words, "to capture the ethereal, druggy feel of the time; that feeling at the end of the night when dawn was breaking and they'd been up all night making music, stoned."

The cover photo was shot at the Primrose Hill viewpoint in the misty early-morning sunlight, looking west. Brian Jones' dishevelled and gaunt appearance disturbed many of his fans, and critic David Dalton wrote that he looked "like a doomed albino raccoon". "Brian [Jones] was lurking in his collar", Mankowitz commented years later. "I was frustrated because it felt like we were on the verge of something really special, and he was messing it up. But the way Brian appeared to not give a shit is exactly what the band was about." Outtakes from this photo session were later used for the cover and inner sleeves of the 1972 ABKCO compilation release More Hot Rocks (Big Hits & Fazed Cookies).

The back cover of Between the Buttons is dominated by a six-panel cartoon accompanied by a rhythmic poem drawn by Watts. When he asked Oldham what the title of the album would be, he told him it was "between the buttons", a name Jagger came up with after noticing the shiny buttons on Watt's shirt. On the album cover itself, the band name and album title appear on the buttons on Watts' overcoat. Often difficult to see, this text was included blown up on a hype sticker affixed to original US pressings and would also be added to the bottom corners of the artwork for several CD and LP reissues.

== Marketing and sales ==
Between the Buttons, like many British long-players of the era, differed between its UK and US versions. The UK edition (in the form Oldham and the Stones intended it) was issued on 20 January 1967 (Mono, LK 4852; Stereo, SKL 4852) on Decca Records, concurrently with a separate single, "Let's Spend the Night Together" b/w "Ruby Tuesday". As was common in the British record industry at the time, the single did not appear on the album. Between the Buttons reached number three in the UK. In the US, the album was released by London Records on 23 January 1967 (mono, LL 3499; stereo, PS 499). "Let's Spend the Night Together" and "Ruby Tuesday" were slotted onto the album while "Back Street Girl" and "Please Go Home" were removed (these would be included on the following US odds-and-ends release, Flowers, in June 1967). With "Ruby Tuesday" reaching number one, Between the Buttons shot to number two in the US, going gold.

In August 2002, both editions of Between the Buttons were reissued in a new remastered CD and SACD digipak by ABKCO Records. Almost all reissues of the album since 1968 have been in stereo; in 2016, the album's mono release was reissued on CD, vinyl, and digital download as part of The Rolling Stones in Mono. While most reissues have used the US track listing to maximise profit by featuring the two hit singles, the UK version was re-issued by ABKCO in 2003 on 180-gram vinyl in the US.

== Critical reception and legacy ==
Professional ratings
Retrospective reviews
Review scores
Source	Rating
AllMusic	5/5 stars
Entertainment Weekly	A
The Great Rock Discography	7/10
MusicHound Rock	4/5 stars
Music Story	4/5 stars
The Rolling Stone Album Guide	5/5 stars
Tom Hull	A

Between the Buttons was called "among the greatest rock albums" by Robert Christgau, who later included it in his "Basic Record Library" of 1950s and 1960s recordings, published in Christgau's Record Guide: Rock Albums of the Seventies (1981). He also wrote of the album for Rolling Stone magazine's "40 Essential Albums of 1967": "[T]his underrated keeper is distinguished by complex rhymes, complex sexual stereotyping, and the non-blues, oh-so-rock-and-roll pianos of Ian Stewart, Jack Nitzsche, Nicky Hopkins, and Brian Jones."

AllMusic's Richie Unterberger hailed it as one of the Rolling Stones' "strongest, most eclectic LPs". In a retrospective review for Entertainment Weekly, David Browne called the album "a cheeky set of sardonic Swinging London vaudeville rock", while Billboard magazine's Christopher Walsh wrote that "it's brimming with overlooked gems, the band delivering a captivating blend of folky, Beatles-esque pop and tough bluesy rockers."

Tom Moon wrote in The Rolling Stone Album Guide (2004) that the album was "lighter and thinner" than Aftermath and, "having belatedly discovered pop melody, Jagger and Richards were suddenly overdosing on the stuff". Music scholars Philippe Margotin and Jean-Michel Guesdon observed baroque pop and music hall on the album. Jim DeRogatis included Between the Buttons in his 2003 list of the essential psychedelic rock albums. In 2000, Brian Wilson said "My Obsession" was his favorite song by the Rolling Stones.

In 2003, the American version of Between the Buttons was ranked number 355 on Rolling Stone magazine's 500 Greatest Albums of All Time list, and re-ranked number 357 in 2012.

== Use in other media ==
In a scene in Wes Anderson's 2001 film The Royal Tenenbaums, the character Margot (Gwyneth Paltrow) plays Between the Buttons on a record player. She cues up the track "She Smiled Sweetly", which is followed by "Ruby Tuesday". ("Ruby Tuesday" appears on the US release of the album, though it does not follow "She Smiled Sweetly" in the track order.)

== Track listing ==
=== UK edition ===
All tracks are written by Mick Jagger and Keith Richards.

Side one
No.	Title	Length
1.	"Yesterday's Papers"	2:20
2.	"My Obsession"	3:20
3.	"Back Street Girl"	3:22
4.	"Connection"	2:13
5.	"She Smiled Sweetly"	2:42
6.	"Cool, Calm & Collected"	4:15
Total length:		18:12

Side two
No.	Title	Length
1.	"All Sold Out"	2:15
2.	"Please Go Home"	3:14
3.	"Who's Been Sleeping Here?"	3:51
4.	"Complicated"	3:18
5.	"Miss Amanda Jones"	2:48
6.	"Something Happened to Me Yesterday"	4:58
Total length:		20:24

=== US edition ===
All tracks are written by Mick Jagger and Keith Richards.

Side one
No.	Title	Length
1.	"Let's Spend the Night Together"	3:29
2.	"Yesterday's Papers"	2:20
3.	"Ruby Tuesday"	3:12
4.	"Connection"	2:13
5.	"She Smiled Sweetly"	2:42
6.	"Cool, Calm & Collected"	4:15
Total length:		18:11

Side two
No.	Title	Length
1.	"All Sold Out"	2:15
2.	"My Obsession"	3:20
3.	"Who's Been Sleeping Here?"	3:51
4.	"Complicated"	3:18
5.	"Miss Amanda Jones"	2:48
6.	"Something Happened to Me Yesterday"	4:58
Total length:		20:30

== Personnel ==
Track numbers refer to the original UK edition.

The Rolling Stones

- Mick Jagger – lead vocals (all but 4), harmony vocals (4), backing vocals (1, 8), tambourine (1, 4–5, 9–10), maracas (8), bass drum (4), harmonica (6)
- Keith Richards – electric guitar (1–2, 4, 6–12), acoustic guitar (3, 9, 12), 12-string acoustic guitar (1), fuzz guitar (1, 11), backing vocals (1–2, 5, 7–8, 10–11), lead vocals (4), co-lead vocals (12), bass guitar (1, 4–5, 12), organ (5)
- Brian Jones – backing vocals (1), vibraphone (1, 3), electric dulcimer (6), banjo (6), kazoo (6), harmonica (6), piano (7), recorder (7), electric guitar (8), theremin (8), harmonica (9), autoharp (9), organ (10), trumpet (12), trombone (12), tuba (12), whistles (12)
- Bill Wyman – bass guitar (1–3, 6–12), backing vocals (1, 7)
- Charlie Watts – drums (1–2, 5–12), tambourine (3), snare drum (4), maracas (10)

Additional personnel

- Jack Nitzsche – harpsichord (1, 3), piano (4–5, 9, 12), organ pedals (4)
- Ian Stewart – piano (2, 10–11), organ (11)
- Nicky Hopkins – piano (6)
- Nick DeCaro – French accordion (3)
- Mike Leander – orchestral arrangement (12)
- Shirley Watts – backing vocals (8)
- Unidentified Rolling Stones – handclaps (4)
- Unidentified session musicians – tuba, clarinet, trumpet, trombone and violin (12)

== Charts ==
Chart (1967)	Peak position
Australian Albums (Kent Music Report)	7
Finland (The Official Finnish Charts)	9
German Albums (Offizielle Top 100)	2
Norwegian Albums (VG-lista)	2
UK Albums (Official Charts)	3
US Billboard 200	2

== Certifications ==
Region	Certification	Certified units/sales
United States (RIAA)	Gold	500,000^{^}
^{^} Shipments figures based on certification alone.
