= ABKCO Records =

American independent record label

ABKCO Music & Records, Inc.
- Predecessor: Allen Klein & Co.
- Founded: 1961
- Founder: Allen Klein
- Headquarters: New York City, United States
- Revenue: $26,000,000
- Number of employees: 43
- Footnotes / references distributed by Universal Music Group

ABKCO Music & Records, Inc. (Allen & Betty Klein Company) is an American independent record label, music publisher, and film and video production company. It owns and/or administers the rights to music by Sam Cooke, the Rolling Stones, the Animals, Herman's Hermits, Marianne Faithfull, Dishwalla, the Kinks as well as the Cameo Parkway label, which includes recordings by such artists as Chubby Checker, Bobby Rydell, the Orlons, the Dovells, Question Mark & the Mysterians, the Tymes and Dee Dee Sharp. Until 2009, ABKCO administered Philles Records and its master recordings, including hits by the Righteous Brothers, the Ronettes, the Crystals and others (via a licensing deal with EMI Music Publishing, which owned the Philles catalog since the mid-1990s). The label is infamous for its management contracts and lawsuits by its founder Allen Klein, the latter of which persisted until his death.

ABKCO Records is currently distributed by Universal Music Distribution, which also controls distribution of the Rolling Stones' post-ABKCO catalog through Polydor Records and Interscope Records.

In addition to music, ABKCO controls the rights to Alejandro Jodorowsky's early films, including Fando y Lis, El Topo, and The Holy Mountain. Additionally, they served as a production company on Regina King’s 2020 film One Night in Miami, in which Sam Cooke is a central character.

Selected soundtrack releases from the label include the films Joy, Safety Not Guaranteed, Our Idiot Brother, Fast Five, The Worlds End, Scott Pilgrim vs. The World, Percy Jackson & the Olympians: The Lightning Thief, The Men Who Stare At Goats, and the films of director Wes Anderson, starting from The Darjeeling Limited onwards. The label has also released soundtracks for the television shows Big Little Lies, Boardwalk Empire, and Californication.

== History ==
ABKCO is the successor company to a business that was founded in 1961 as Allen Klein & Co. Allen Klein (1931–2009) was then a business manager specializing in music clients including Bobby Darin and Sam Cooke and, later, managed the Rolling Stones and the Beatles. ABKCO Industries was founded in 1968 as an umbrella company involved in management, music publishing, film, TV and theatrical production. (The acronym stood for "Allen & Betty Klein and COmpany," although Klein would often joke that it stood for "A Better Kind of COmpany"). Later that year, ABKCO acquired the Cameo-Parkway Records catalog along with a manufacturing facility which the company later used to produce records by several of its artists, including the Beatles and Rolling Stones.

The label had been heavily criticized by many fans for keeping the Cameo-Parkway material unavailable until 2005. ABKCO's licensing policy prevented releasing the original version of songs for compilations. ABKCO sat on the entire catalog of music from artists such as Bobby Rydell and Chubby Checker. Some original artists had to re-record their hits for inclusion on bargain-basement oldies LP's. Checker was forced to re-record his hits such as "The Twist".

ABKCO is active in the release of compilations and reissues from its catalogs, film and commercial placement of its master recordings and music publishing properties. Jody Klein, president of ABKCO, has been credited in the liner notes of the recordings in not only getting the Cameo-Parkway recordings (which he partially owns) finally released, but also overseeing an extensive remastering of the Rolling Stones, the Animals, Herman’s Hermits, and Sam Cooke's 1960s recordings. Allen Klein died in 2009.

== Lawsuits ==
In January 1970, the Beatles signed a music publishing management contract with ABKCO Industries. At some point after the contract was terminated, ABKCO sued the group, a suit resolved in 1977 when the Beatles paid ABKCO $4.2 million; other ABKCO Beatles-related lawsuits continued for at least a decade.

One such case would include ABKCO Music, Inc. v. Harrisongs Music, Ltd. Former Beatle George Harrison (under Harrison Interests) was sued by Bright Tunes Music Corporation over the similarities between Harrison's "My Sweet Lord" and "He's So Fine" (by the Chiffons), the rights of which were owned by Bright Tunes. At the time, ABKCO was managing work released by Harrison, as well as other material by the Beatles, which meant that they were defendants in the case; that is, until ABKCO made a successful motion to acquire Bright Tunes and all of their copyrights, after years of negotiation. Another lawsuit was then initiated by ABKCO against Harrison Interests over the similarities between "My Sweet Lord" and "He's So Fine". Eventually, the case was ruled as copyright infringement on the part of Harrison, which resulted in him paying damages for the infringement; however, ABKCO was also found guilty of breaching their fiduciary duty by purchasing Bright Tunes with intimate knowledge of the defendant's defense in the case, indicating that ABKCO was withholding the earnings from their acquisition, which was to be paid to Harrison Interests with interest. The decision was appealed by both parties, but the district court's decision was upheld by the appellate court.

ABKCO sued the Verve over their song "Bitter Sweet Symphony", which samples the Andrew Oldham Orchestra recording of "The Last Time" by the Rolling Stones. In May 2019, Mick Jagger and Keith Richards of the Rolling Stones handed back the rights to all future royalties of the songs to the Verve (having split ties with ABKCO Records).

In July 2008, ABKCO filed a lawsuit against Lil Wayne for copyright infringement and unfair competition, specifically referring to the track "Playing with Fire" on his album Tha Carter III. In the lawsuit, ABKCO claims that the song was obviously derived from the Rolling Stones' "Play with Fire", a song for which ABKCO owns the rights. As a result, "Playing with Fire" was removed from the online music track listings of Tha Carter III album.

== In popular culture ==
"Beware of Darkness" is a song by George Harrison that featured on his first post-Beatles album All Things Must Pass. When he was demo-ing this song for Phil Spector during 1970 he jokingly changed one line of the lyrics to "Beware of ABKCO". This became the name of a 1994 bootleg album containing the recordings from that session.
