= I Am Waiting (song) =

Song by the Rolling Stones

from the album Aftermath
- Released: 15 April 1966 (UK); 2 July 1966 (US)
- Recorded: 6–9 March 1966
- Studio: RCA, Hollywood, California
- Genre: Folk rock; english folk
- Length: 3:11
- Label: Decca (UK); London (US)
- Songwriter: Jagger/Richards
- Producer: Andrew Loog Oldham

Aftermath track listing
- 14 tracks Side one: 1. "Mother's Little Helper"; 2. "Stupid Girl"; 3. "Lady Jane"; 4. "Under My Thumb"; 5. "Doncha Bother Me"; 6. "Goin' Home"; Side two: 7. "Flight 505"; 8. "High and Dry"; 9. "Out of Time"; 10. "It's Not Easy"; 11. "I Am Waiting"; 12. "Take It or Leave It"; 13. "Think"; 14. "What to Do"

"I Am Waiting" is a song recorded by the English rock band the Rolling Stones. It was written by Mick Jagger and Keith Richards and released on the band's 1966 studio album Aftermath.

== Lyrics and music ==
"I Am Waiting" was recorded between 6 and 9 March 1966 at RCA Studios in Hollywood, California.

The song's lyrics are obscure. They have the singer "waiting for someone to come out of somewhere" but don't provide any details of the circumstances. According to Allmusic critic Richie Unterberger, this is not a problem since "enhancing the general mysterious atmosphere is more important than providing an answer". Music critic Bill Janovitz suggests that the first verse sounds like singer Jagger is "tiptoeing as if in a game of hide and seek". Janovitz suggests that the first refrain begins to suggest that the singer may not just be waiting for an actual person, but rather it suggests "a deepening perception ... that promises to offset the paranoia in the lyrics" with the words "It happens all the time/It's censored from our minds." Rolling Stones biographer Martin Elliott interprets the message of the lyrics as "don't fear the reaper."

The music of the song is one of several Rolling Stones songs from this period that shows Appalachian and English folk influences. As he does on "Lady Jane", another song from Aftermath, Rolling Stones guitarist Brian Jones plays a dulcimer on "I Am Waiting". Jack Nitzsche plays harpsichord. Bill Wyman's slow and "eerie" bassline and the acoustic guitars add to the effect. In the song's unusual structure, the refrains are louder and rock harder than the slow verses. In Janovitz's interpretation, the harder refrains permit Jagger to "vent the frustration" that has been built up through the verses. Author James Hector remarks that this allows the song to "[blow] hot and cold with remarkable subtlety" and Rolling Stones biographer Steve Appleford states that the eruptions in the refrains produce a "fine melodramatic effect" and allows the pop music of the verses to "explode into moments of yearning".

== Personnel ==
According to authors Philippe Margotin and Jean-Michel Guesdon:

The Rolling Stones

- Mick Jagger – vocals
- Keith Richards – acoustic guitars
- Brian Jones – dulcimer
- Bill Wyman – bass guitar
- Charlie Watts – drums

Additional musician

- Jack Nitzsche – tambourine (Note: Margotin and Guesdon express uncertainty about Nitzsche's contribution, writing he is "apparently on tambourine".)

== Reception ==
Unterberger calls "I Am Waiting" a "very strange but musically attractive effort" that is a "highlight" among early Rolling Stones album tracks. Janovitz praises how the song combines Eastern thought that was popular in music during the mid-1960s with "broadening sonics and higher fidelity." He states that Jagger "is singing with authority about fear, paranoia and a part of our minds closed from wider perception." Hector calls the song "one of the band's most extra-ordinary mid-sixties compositions." Author Jim Beviglia rates it as the Rolling Stones' #32 all-time greatest song, calling it a "wistful, wonderful track." In 2012 the editors of Rolling Stone rated it the band's #67 all-time greatest song. On the other hand, Elliott does not regard it as being particularly strong, but states that it reflects the band's attitude at the time of "art for art's sake."

== Other versions ==
"I Am Waiting" was used in Wes Anderson's 1998 film Rushmore. The band performed the song live on an episode of Ready Steady Go! in a performance that Rolling Stone described as "an image of the band maturing in real time."

Lindsey Buckingham recorded a version included on his 2006 album Under the Skin.
