= Stupid Girl (Rolling Stones song) =

Song by the Rolling Stones

- Cover of 1966 US single

Song by The Rolling Stones

from the album Aftermath
- A-side: "Paint It, Black"
- Released: 15 April 1966 (UK); 7 May 1966 (US)
- Genre: Surf rock; soul
- Length: 2:55
- Label: Decca; ABKCO (UK); London; ABKCO (US)
- Songwriter: Jagger/Richards
- Producer: Andrew Loog Oldham

Aftermath track listing
- 14 tracks Side one: 1. "Mother's Little Helper"; 2. "Stupid Girl"; 3. "Lady Jane"; 4. "Under My Thumb"; 5. "Doncha Bother Me"; 6. "Goin' Home"; Side two: 7. "Flight 505"; 8. "High and Dry"; 9. "Out of Time"; 10. "It's Not Easy"; 11. "I Am Waiting"; 12. "Take It or Leave It"; 13. "Think"; 14. "What to Do"

"Stupid Girl" is a song recorded by the English rock band the Rolling Stones. Written by Mick Jagger and Keith Richards, the song featured on the band's 1966 album Aftermath. It was also issued as the B-side of the US "Paint It Black" single.

== Background and writing ==
Written by Mick Jagger and Keith Richards, "Stupid Girl" is noted for its apparently degrading lyrics towards a woman, a claim also made about other Rolling Stones songs like "Under My Thumb". On the song, Bill Janovitz says in his review,

"Unlike another of the album's put-downs, "Under My Thumb," "Stupid Girl" rails and spits venom with a high school garage rock band-like intensity and with about the same level of polish and focus. But while it is not as well-written as "Under My Thumb," "Stupid Girl" possesses an endearing and energetic snottiness that might have won the Stones a good amount of sexually frustrated young men fans who might have otherwise started to defect to the Who and the Kinks when they heard ballads like "Lady Jane."

On the song's lyrics, Richards said in a 1971 interview with Rolling Stone,

"It was all a spin-off from our environment... hotels, and too many dumb chicks. Not all dumb, not by any means, but that's how one got. When you're canned up - half the time it's impossible to go out - it was to go through a whole sort of football match."

When asked about the song and its influences, Jagger said in a 1995 interview with the same magazine,

"Yeah, it's much nastier than 'Under My Thumb'... Obviously, I was having a bit of trouble. I wasn't in a good relationship. Or I was in too many bad relationships. I had so many girlfriends at that point. None of them seemed to care they weren't pleasing me very much. I was obviously in with the wrong group."

I'm not talking about the kind of clothes she wears - look at that stupid girl. I'm not talking about the way she combs her hair - look at that stupid girl.

The way she talks about someone else; That she don't even know herself; She's the sickest thing in this world; Well look at that stupid girl

"Stupid Girl" was recorded at Los Angeles' RCA Studios on 6–9 March 1966. With Jagger on lead vocals and tambourine, Richards on electric guitars and backing vocals Brian Jones on acoustic. Charlie Watts on drums, while Bill Wyman plays bass. Ian Stewart plays organ on the song while Jack Nitzsche performs electric piano.

It was included on the 1989 compilation Singles Collection: The London Years.

== Cover versions ==
Ellen Foley covered this song on her 1979 debut studio album Night Out (album).

== Personnel ==
According to authors Philippe Margotin and Jean-Michel Guesdon, except where noted:

The Rolling Stones

- Mick Jagger – vocals
- Keith Richards – lead guitar, acoustic guitar, backing vocals
- Brian Jones – rhythm guitar
- Bill Wyman – bass
- Charlie Watts – drums

Additional musicians

- Ian Stewart – Hammond organ
- Jack Nitzsche – tambourine
