= Take It or Leave It (Rolling Stones song) =

Song written by Mick Jagger and Keith Richards

Single by the Searchers
- B-side: "Don't Hide It Away"
- Released: 8 April 1966
- Recorded: 1966
- Studio: Pye Studios, London
- Genre: Folk rock
- Length: 2:46
- Label: Pye
- Songwriters: Mick Jagger; Keith Richards
- Producer: Tony Hatch

The Searchers singles chronology
"Take Me For What I'm Worth" (1965)	"Take It or Leave It" (1966)	"Have You Ever Loved Somebody" (1966)

"Take It or Leave It" is a song written by Mick Jagger and Keith Richards. It was initially given away by them to the Searchers, a band with declining chart success, in hopes of making them popular again. Pye Records released the single on 8 April 1966 and it peaked at number 31 on the Record Retailer chart in May of that year. Though it was more popular in mainland Europe, the single was their penultimate song to chart. It received mixed reviews in the British Press.

Jagger and Richards recorded the song with their own group, the Rolling Stones, in 1965, for their fourth studio album Aftermath (1966). Written at demand from their manager Andrew Loog Oldham, the song features several key characteristics of their music from this time, including a memorable tune and (arguably) misogynistic lyrics. It was one of the band's earlier and few ventures into folk rock, something that was present on several Aftermath tracks. Decca Records included "Take It or Leave It" on the album, which was released on 15 April 1966. In the US, the song was first issued on the compilation album Flowers, released on 25 June 1967 by London Records.

== The Searchers version ==
Throughout 1965, the Searchers mainstream success in the UK had been steadily declining. Their final top-ten single was "Goodbye My Love" which was released in February 1965. This was primarily due to the group relying on recording cover versions, as opposed to writing original material. Pye Records frantically wanted the group to release a successful single once more, and the group began to hire professional songwriters to write for them. One of these covers became "Take Me For What I'm Worth", written by P. F. Sloan. This became their final top-twenty single in Record Retailer. Following "Take Me For What I'm Worth", the group was offered "Take It or Leave It", written by Jagger–Richards, as a follow-up. Because of the status of both Mick Jagger and Keith Richards, it was thought that "Take It or Leave It" would become a hit. David Luhrssen identifies it as a "Folk rock with characteristics of contemporary folk rock songs from America during the same time.

The song was recorded in 1966 and released through Pye Records in the UK on 8 April of that year. In the UK, it did not become the expected hit single, instead, the song entered Record Retailer on 27 April at a position of 47, before peaking at number 31 on 11 May. It dropped out completely on 1 June at a position of 42, after spending only six weeks on the chart. It was their penultimate single to reach that chart. The single fared better in Continental Europe however, and in Sweden reached number six in Kvällstoppen and number four on Tio i Topp, both official Swedish charts at the time. In the Netherlands, it reached number five, and also saw success in Australia, where it peaked at number eight.

In a blind date for Melody Maker, Crispian St. Peters stated that "Take It or Leave It" didn't appear to have a middle eight. He thought that the record was good, but not on the same level as their previous records. Although he anticipated the single would reach the charts, he closed by stating that the single left a "bitter taste", and would probably grow on him. For New Musical Express, Derek Johnson calls the song a "good adaptation of a Rolling Stones composition." He calls the song "unusual", noting the "fractually mid-tempo" and also praises the harmonies between Mike Pender and Frank Allen. Though he states that it's nothing remarkable "melody-wise", he states that it is "colorful" and "has some good sounds". For Record Mirror, Norman Jopling and Peter Jones write that the Searchers rendition of the song is in the style of the Rolling Stones, though writes that it has a "lighter-vocal edge." They note that several plays are required to fully enjoy the track, and ends the review by noting the production. Bruce Eden of AllMusic writes that their rendition doesn't hold up that well against the Stones own.

== Charts ==
Chart performance for "Take It or Leave It"
Chart (1966)	Peak position
Australia (Go-Set)	8
Netherlands (Dutch Top 40)	5
Netherlands (Single Top 100)	5
Sweden (Kvällstoppen)	6
Sweden (Tio i Topp)	4
UK (Record Retailer)	31

== Rolling Stones version ==
"Take It or Leave It"

Song by the Rolling Stones

from the album Aftermath
- Released: 15 April 1966 (UK); 26 June 1967 (US)
- Recorded: 8–10 December 1965
- Studio: RCA, Hollywood, California
- Genre: Folk rock
- Length: 2:47
- Label: Decca (UK); London (US)
- Songwriter: Jagger/Richards
- Producer: Andrew Loog Oldham

Aftermath track listing
- 14 tracks Side one: 1. "Mother's Little Helper"; 2. "Stupid Girl"; 3. "Lady Jane"; 4. "Under My Thumb"; 5. "Doncha Bother Me"; 6. "Goin' Home"; Side two: 7. "Flight 505"; 8. "High and Dry"; 9. "Out of Time"; 10. "It's Not Easy"; 11. "I Am Waiting"; 12. "Take It or Leave It"; 13. "Think"; 14. "What to Do"

Contemporary to the Searchers, the Rolling Stones also recorded "Take It or Leave It" for their album Aftermath. The song was one of the first ten or twenty songs recorded in a batch for the album, all of who were recorded between 6–10 December 1965 at RCA Studios in Hollywood, Los Angeles. "Take It or Leave It" however, was primarily worked on between 8–10 December of that year. According to authors Philippe Margotin and Jean-Michel Guesdon, Andrew Loog Oldham's production on the track might have been inspired by Phil Spector and his production method Wall of Sound. This can in large part be attributed to the lax atmosphere in the studio; according to Keith Richards, the album was not a result of a rush-job, and instead the band had a chance to relax during recording.

The song had the Rolling Stones experimenting with instruments; on the track, Mick Jagger sings, Richards is on acoustic guitar and backing vocals, Bill Wyman plays bass while Charlie Watts is on drums and finger cymbals. On the recording, they are assisted by session musician Jack Nitzsche on harpsichord. There is some conflicting information on what instrument Brian Jones plays on the recording. While Margotin and Guesdon state that he's playing the organ on the song, Bill Janovitz writes that Jones plays the Japanese instrument koto on the recording. However, Gary Jucha writes that Jones was also responsible for the harpsichord part and also played percussion on the song. This is most likely attributed to the Stones increased experimentation in the studio; alternatively, it can also be attributed to Jones' habit of seeking out "exotic" instruments to play for the group's recordings.

According to Margotin and Guesdon, "Take It or Leave It" is an example of a song written "at the orders of Andrew Loog Oldham." They also draw parallels to the pairs earlier compositions, which also had a similar principle. Though they call it an "unpretentious song", they also praise it for "Mick's feel for telling a phrase" and the fact that Richards was able to write a memorable song on demand. Lyrically, "Take It or Leave It" is about the "difficult relations between men and women." Richie Unterberger of AllMusic find the lyrics misogynistic, something he states for most songs that appeared on Aftermath, (although the song "It's Not Easy" acknowledges that "It seems a big failing in a man ... to take his girl for granted if he can"). However, by contrast to their extremely misogynistic "Under My Thumb", this song may be considered rather as a fair and "friendly" representation of hurt feelings of a suitor who has offered "just my life". He also adds that it has several characteristics of folk rock, which he doesn't feel is "necessarily in the Stones style."

"Take It or Leave It" was initially released on the Rolling Stones album Aftermath in the UK on 15 April 1966. On the album, the song is sequenced as track six in the middle of side two, between the songs "I Am Waiting" and "Think". It was however cut from the US release of the album which came out on 2 July, together with Mother's Little Helper", "Out of Time" and "What to Do". This tied in with the practice of British LP's getting different track listings in the US. In the US, the song did not get a release for over a year, until it was released on Flowers on 25 June 1967, a compilation album which featured several unissued songs by the band. On that album, "Take It or Leave It" is sequenced as the fourth track on side two, between "Mother's Little Helper" and "Ride On, Baby".

=== Personnel ===
According to authors Philippe Margotin and Jean-Michel Guesdon:

The Rolling Stones

- Mick Jagger – vocals
- Keith Richards – acoustic guitar, backing vocals
- Brian Jones – organ, koto
- Bill Wyman – bass guitar
- Charlie Watts – drums, finger cymbals

Additional musician

- Jack Nitzsche – harpsichord
