= Goin' Home (Rolling Stones song) =

1966 song by The Rolling Stones

Song by the Rolling Stones

from the album Aftermath
- Released: 15 April 1966 (UK); 2 July 1966 (US)
- Recorded: 8–10 December 1965
- Studio: RCA (Los Angeles)
- Genre: Blues rock
- Length: 11:18
- Label: Decca/ABKCO (UK); London/ABKCO (US and Canada)
- Songwriter: Jagger/Richards
- Producer: Andrew Loog Oldham

Aftermath track listing
- 14 tracks Side one: 1. "Mother's Little Helper"; 2. "Stupid Girl"; 3. "Lady Jane"; 4. "Under My Thumb"; 5. "Doncha Bother Me"; 6. "Goin' Home"; Side two: 7. "Flight 505"; 8. "High and Dry"; 9. "Out of Time"; 10. "It's Not Easy"; 11. "I Am Waiting"; 12. "Take It or Leave It"; 13. "Think"; 14. "What to Do"

"Goin' Home" is a song recorded by the English rock band the Rolling Stones. Written by Mick Jagger and Keith Richards, it was the first extended rock improvisation released by a major recording act. It was included as the sixth track on side one of the United Kingdom version and the fifth track on side two of the American version of the band's 1966 studio album Aftermath.

== Writing and recording ==
"Goin Home" was written by Mick Jagger and Keith Richards, and recorded at RCA Studios in Hollywood from 8 to 10 December 1965. The recording is a long blues-inspired track that is notable as one of the first songs by a rock and roll band to break the ten-minute mark and the longest recorded song on any Stones album. While many bands had stretched a song's duration in live performances, and Bob Dylan was known to write long songs (such as "Desolation Row"), "Goin' Home" was the first "jam" recorded expressly for an album. In an interview with the magazine Rolling Stone, Richards said:

It was the first long rock and roll cut. It broke that two-minute barrier. We tried to make singles as long as we could do then because we just liked to let things roll on. Dylan was used to building a song for 20 minutes because of the folk thing he came from. That was another thing. No one sat down to make an 11-minute track. I mean 'Goin' Home', the song was written just the first 2 and a half minutes. We just happened to keep the tape rolling, me on guitar, Brian [Jones] on harp, Bill [Wyman, on bass] and Charlie [Watts, on drums] and Mick. If there's a piano, it's Stew [Ian Stewart].

Jack Nitzsche, a regular Stones contributor throughout the 1960s, here performs percussion.

The song, while lengthy, is built around a common theme, as opposed to later Stones songs of great length like "Midnight Rambler" or "Can't You Hear Me Knocking" which are divided into distinct sections punctuated by differing instrumentations. "Goin' Home" plays as a long jam, eventually deconstructing Richards' guitar piece, Jagger's lyrics, and Watts' drum lines which build in power as the song progresses. Jagger's lyrics are called "a basic expression of [his] pining for his girl and determining to go home and get him some. It's the bumpety-bump, ascending chorus of announcing his intentions to go home that's the most 'pop' element of the song." A bitter-sweet ending is in the final lyrics: "Come on, little girl, you may look sweet, but I know you ain't".

Classic Rock History critic Matthew Pollard rated "Goin' Home" as the Rolling Stones' 10th best deep cut, based on the raw rhythm, "nice effects-driven blues riff," Brian Jones' harmonica playing and Mick Jagger's "sex-drenched innuendos."

== Legacy ==
According to the music historian Nicholas Schaffner, at 11 minutes and 35 seconds, "Goin' Home" displaced the 1965 Bob Dylan song "Desolation Row" (11:21) as the longest recording in popular music. In fact, the album cover lists a running time of 11 minutes and 35 seconds, while the track actually lasts 11 minutes and 18 seconds — a shorter duration than Bob Dylan’s "Desolation Row". He also cites it as "the first extended improvisation released by a major rock group—though by no means the last."

== Personnel ==
According to authors Philippe Margotin and Jean-Michel Guesdon, except where noted:

The Rolling Stones

- Mick Jagger – vocals
- Keith Richards – lead guitar, rhythm guitar
- Brian Jones – harmonica
- Bill Wyman – bass guitar
- Charlie Watts – brushed bass drum

Additional musicians

- Ian Stewart – piano
- Jack Nitzsche – tambourine

== Notes ==
=== Sources ===
- Babiuk, Andy; Prevost, Greg (2013). Rolling Stones Gear: All the Stones' Instruments from Stage to Studio. Milwaukee: Backbeat Books. ISBN 978-1-61713-092-2.
- Margotin, Philippe; Guesdon, Jean-Michel (2016). The Rolling Stones All the Songs: The Story Behind Every Track. New York: Black Dog & Leventhal Publishers. ISBN 978-0-316-31774-0.
