= Aftermath (Rolling Stones album) =

1966 studio album by the Rolling Stones

- UK release

Studio album by the Rolling Stones
- Released: 15 April 1966
- Recorded: 8–10 December 1965; 6–9 March 1966
- Studio: RCA (Hollywood)
- Genres: Hard rock; pop rock; blues rock; art rock
- Length: 52:23 (UK); 42:35 (US)
- Labels: Decca (UK); London (US)
- Producer: Andrew Loog Oldham

The Rolling Stones UK chronology
Out of Our Heads (1965)	Aftermath (1966)	Big Hits (High Tide and Green Grass) (1966)

The Rolling Stones US chronology
Big Hits (High Tide and Green Grass) (1966)	Aftermath (1966)	Got Live If You Want It! (1966)

Alternative cover
- US release

Singles from Aftermath
- 1. "Paint It Black" (Note: The song was originally released as "Paint It, Black", the comma being an error by Decca Records.) / "Stupid Girl" Released: May 1966 (US); 2. "Mother's Little Helper" / "Lady Jane" Released: July 1966 (US)

Aftermath is the fourth studio album by the English rock band the Rolling Stones. The group recorded the album at RCA Studios in California in December 1965 and March 1966, during breaks between their international tours. It was released in the United Kingdom on 15 April 1966 by Decca Records and in the United States in late June by London Records. It is the band's fourth British and sixth American studio album, and closely follows a series of international hit singles that helped bring the Stones newfound wealth and fame rivalling that of their contemporaries the Beatles.

Aftermath is considered by music scholars to be an artistic breakthrough for the Rolling Stones. It is their first album to consist entirely of original compositions, all of which were credited to Mick Jagger and Keith Richards. The band's original leader Brian Jones reemerged as a key contributor and experimented with instruments not usually associated with popular music, including the sitar, Appalachian dulcimer, Japanese koto and marimbas, as well as playing guitar and harmonica. Along with Jones' instrumental textures, the Stones incorporated a wider range of chords and stylistic elements beyond their Chicago blues and R&B influences, such as pop, folk, country, psychedelia, Baroque and Middle Eastern music. Influenced by intense love affairs, tensions within the group and a demanding touring itinerary, Jagger and Richards wrote the album around psychodramatic themes of love, sex, desire, power and dominance, hate, obsession, modern society and rock stardom. Women feature as prominent characters in their often dark, sarcastic, casually offensive lyrics.

The album's release was briefly delayed by controversy over the original packaging idea and title – Could You Walk on the Water? – due to the London label's fear of offending Christians in the US with its allusion to Jesus walking on water. In response to the lack of creative control, and without another idea for the title, the Stones bitterly settled on Aftermath, and two different photos of the band were used for the cover to each edition of the album. The UK release featured a run-time of more than 52 minutes, the longest for a popular music LP up to that point. The American edition was issued with a shorter track listing, substituting the single "Paint It Black" in place of four of the British version's songs, in keeping with the industry preference for shorter LPs in the US market at the time.

Aftermath was an immediate commercial success in both the UK and the US, topping the British albums chart for eight consecutive weeks and eventually achieving platinum certification from the Recording Industry Association of America. An inaugural release of the album era and a rival to the contemporaneous impact of the Beatles' Rubber Soul (1965), it reflected the youth culture and values of 1960s Swinging London and the burgeoning counterculture while attracting thousands of new fans to the Rolling Stones. The album was also highly successful with critics, although some listeners were offended by the derisive attitudes towards female characters in certain songs. Its subversive music solidified the band's rebellious rock image while pioneering the darker psychological and social content that glam rock and British punk rock would explore in the 1970s. Aftermath has since been considered the most important of the Stones' early, formative music and their first classic album, frequently ranking on professional lists of the greatest albums.

== Background ==
In 1965, the Rolling Stones' popularity increased markedly with a series of international hit singles written by the band's lead singer Mick Jagger and their guitarist Keith Richards. This success attracted the attention of Allen Klein, an American businessman who became their US representative in August while Andrew Loog Oldham, the group's manager, continued in the role of promoter and record producer. One of Klein's first actions on the band's behalf was to force Decca Records to grant a $1.2 million royalty advance to the group ($12,182,819 in 2025), bringing the members their first signs of financial wealth and allowing them to purchase country houses and new cars. Their October–December 1965 tour of North America was the group's fourth and largest tour there up to that point. According to the biographer Victor Bockris, through Klein's involvement, the concerts afforded the band "more publicity, more protection and higher fees than ever before".

By this time, the Rolling Stones had begun to respond to the increasingly sophisticated music of the Beatles, in comparison to whom they had long been promoted by Oldham as a rougher alternative. With the success of the Jagger-Richards-penned singles "(I Can't Get No) Satisfaction" (1965), "Get Off of My Cloud" (1965) and "19th Nervous Breakdown" (1966), the band increasingly rivalled the Beatles' musical and cultural influence. The Stones' outspoken, surly attitude on songs like "Satisfaction" alienated the Establishment detractors of rock music, which, as the music historian Colin King explains, "only made the group more appealing to those sons and daughters who found themselves estranged from the hypocrisies of the adult world – an element that would solidify into an increasingly militant and disenchanted counterculture as the decade wore on." Like other contemporary British and American rock acts, with Aftermath the Stones sought to create an album as an artistic statement, inspired by the Beatles' achievements with their December 1965 release Rubber Soul – an LP that Oldham later described as having "changed the musical world we lived in then to the one we still live in today".

In 1966, inspired by the formidable women around them, driven by the twin engines of ambition and drugs, the Rolling Stones continued a run of visionary hit singles and began to release albums that stood as crucial works of the era. The influence of a powerful new female energy on the Stones was undeniable ... At the same time, it was the era of "Stupid Girl" and "Under My Thumb," misogynist songs of dominance set to the Stones' darkest, most ardent music.

— Stephen Davis (2001)

Within the Stones, tensions were rife as Brian Jones continued to be viewed by fans and the press as the band's leader, a situation that Jagger and Oldham resented. The group dynamics were also affected by some of the band members' romantic entanglements. Jones' new relationship with the German model Anita Pallenberg, which had taken on sadomasochistic aspects, helped renew his confidence and encourage him to experiment musically, while her intelligence and sophistication both intimidated and elicited envy from the other Stones. Jagger came to view his girlfriend, Chrissie Shrimpton, as inadequate by comparison; while Jagger sought a more glamorous companion commensurate with his newfound wealth, the aura surrounding Jones and Pallenberg contributed to the end of his and Shrimpton's increasingly acrimonious relationship. Richards' relationship with Linda Keith also deteriorated as her drug use escalated to include Mandrax and heroin. The band's biographer Stephen Davis describes these entanglements as a "revolution under way within the Stones", adding that "Anita Pallenberg restored the faltering Brian Jones to his place in the band and in the Rolling Stones mythos. Keith Richards fell in love with her too, and their romantic triad realigned the precarious political axis within the Stones."

== Writing and recording ==
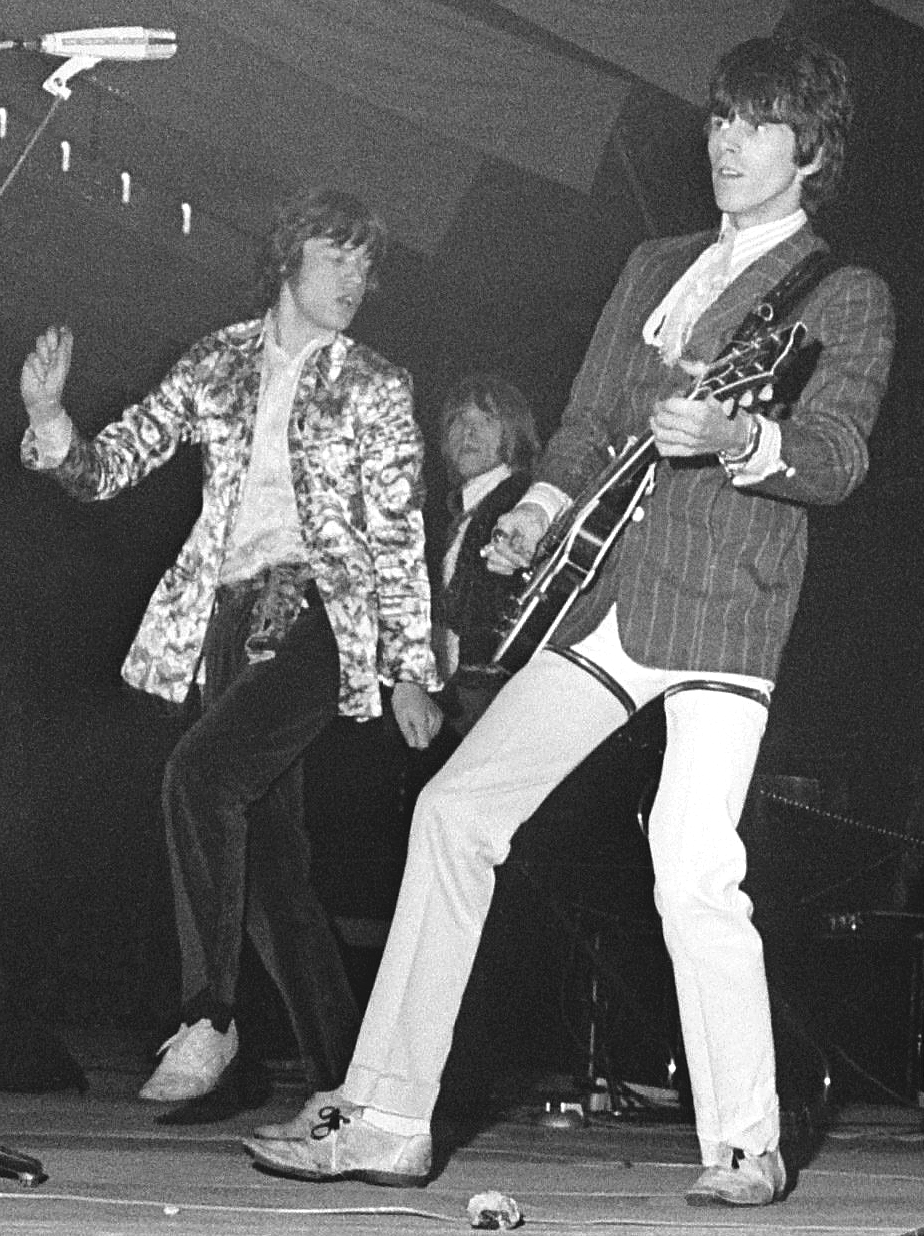
Mick Jagger (left) and Keith Richards (right), the band's chief songwriters, and Brian Jones (back, center), who contributed to Aftermath as a multi-instrumentalist

Aftermath is the first Stones LP to be composed entirely of original material by the group. All the songs were, at Oldham's instigation, written by and credited to the songwriting partnership of Jagger and Richards. The pair wrote much of the material during the October–December 1965 tour and recording began immediately after the tour ended. According to the band's bassist Bill Wyman in his book Rolling with the Stones, they originally conceived Aftermath as the soundtrack for a planned film, Back, Behind and in Front. The plan was abandoned after Jagger met the potential director, Nicholas Ray, and disliked him. (Note: The film was announced on 17 December 1965, with the Rolling Stones reportedly in starring roles. The production was officially cancelled the following May, when a press release stated that the band were due to film a screen adaptation of the Dave Wallis novel Only Lovers Left Alive.) The recording sessions took place at RCA Studios in Los Angeles on 8–10 December 1965 and, following promotion for their "19th Nervous Breakdown" single and an Australasian tour, on 6–9 March 1966. Charlie Watts, the group's drummer, told the press that they had completed 10 songs during the first block of sessions; according to Wyman's book, at least 20 were recorded in March. Among the songs were four tracks issued on singles by the Rolling Stones in the first half of 1966, the A-sides of which were "19th Nervous Breakdown" and "Paint It Black". "Ride On, Baby" and "Sittin' on a Fence" were also recorded during the sessions but were not released until the 1967 US album Flowers.

Referring to the atmosphere at RCA, Richards told Beat Instrumental magazine in February 1966: "Our previous sessions have always been rush jobs. This time we were able to relax a little, take our time." The main engineer for the album, Dave Hassinger, was pivotal in making the group feel comfortable during the sessions, as he let them experiment with instrumentals and team up with session musicians like Jack Nitzsche to variegate their sound. Wyman recalled that Nitzsche and Jones would pick up instruments that were in the studio and experiment with sounds for each song. According to Jagger, Richards was writing a lot of melodies and the group would perform them in different ways, which were mainly thought out in the studio. In the recollection of the engineer Denny Bruce, the songs often developed through Nitzsche organising the musical ideas on piano. Wyman was later critical of Oldham for nurturing Jagger and Richards as songwriters to the exclusion of the rest of the band. The bassist also complained that "Paint It Black" should have been credited to the band's collective pseudonym, Nanker Phelge, rather than Jagger–Richards, since the song originated from a studio improvisation by himself, Jones and Watts, with Jones providing the melody line.

Jones proved important in shaping the album's tone and arrangements, as he experimented with instruments that were unusual in popular music, such as the marimba, sitar and Appalachian dulcimer. Davis cites the "acid imagery and exotic influences" on Rubber Soul, particularly George Harrison's use of the Indian sitar on "Norwegian Wood", as the inspiration for Jones' experimentation with the instrument in January 1966: "One night George put the massive sitar in Brian's hands, and within an hour Brian was working out little melodies." According to Nitzsche, Jones deserved a co-writing credit for "Under My Thumb", which Nitzsche recalled as being an unoriginal-sounding three-chord sequence until Jones discovered a Mexican marimba left behind from a previous session, and transformed the piece by providing its central riff. Wyman agreed, saying, "Well, without the marimba part, it's not really a song, is it?"

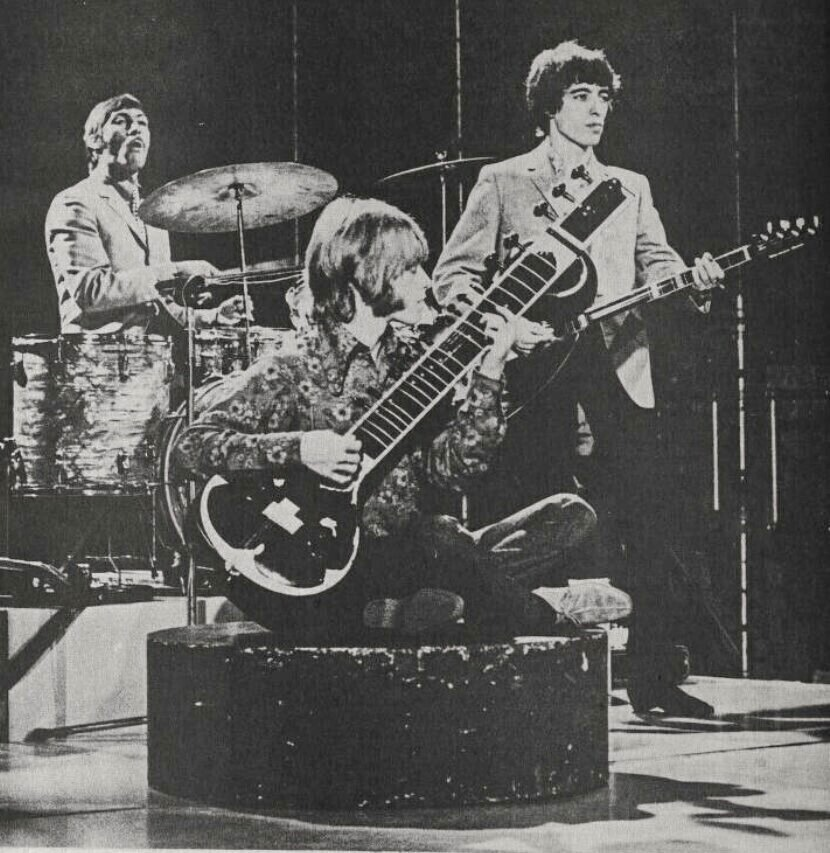
Brian Jones (center) playing the sitar with Charlie Watts (left) and Bill Wyman (right). The sitar is one of several instruments Jones introduced for Aftermath.

During the recording sessions, Richards and Oldham dismissed Jones' interest in exotic instrumentation as an affectation. According to the music journalist Barbara Charone, writing in 1979, everyone connected with the Stones credited Jones for "literally transforming certain records with some odd magical instrument". While Nitzsche was shocked at how cruelly they treated Jones, he later said that Jones was sometimes absent or incapacitated by drugs. Hassinger recalled seeing Jones often "laying on the floor, stoned or on some trip" and unable to play, but that his bandmates would wait for him to leave rather than entering into an argument as other bands would.

Because of Jones' distractions, Richards ended up playing most of the guitar parts for Aftermath, making it one of the first albums to have him do so. Richards later said he found the challenge musically rewarding but resented Jones for his unprofessional attitude when the band were under extreme pressure to record and maintain a hectic touring schedule. On some songs, Richards supported Wyman's bass lines with a fuzz bass part, which the music historians Philippe Margotin and Jean-Michel Guesdon suggest was influenced by Paul McCartney's use on the track "Think for Yourself" (from Rubber Soul). Aftermath was also the first Stones LP to be released with the majority of its tracks in true stereo, as opposed to electronically created stereo.

== Music and composition ==
According to the musicologist David Malvinni, Aftermath is the culmination of the Rolling Stones' stylistic development dating back to 1964, a synthesis of previously explored sounds from the blues, rock and roll, rhythm and blues, soul, folk rock and pop ballads. Margotin and Guesdon go further in saying the album shows the Stones to be free from influences that had overwhelmed their earlier music, specifically the band's Chicago blues roots. Instead, they say, the record features an original style of art rock that resulted from Jones' musical experimentation and draws not only on the blues and rock but also pop, R&B, country, Baroque, classical and world music. Musical tones and scales from English lute song and Middle Eastern music feature among Aftermath's riff-based rock and blues (in both its country and urban forms). While still considering it a blues rock effort, Rob Sheffield likens the music to a collaboration between the art rock band the Velvet Underground and the Stax house band. Neil McCormick of The Telegraph described the album as "R’n’B with a bracingly modern attitude", noting the expanded instrumental repertoire of Jones. In a 1995 interview for Rolling Stone, Jagger regarded it as a stylistically diverse work and milestone for him that "finally laid to rest the ghost of having to do these very nice and interesting, no doubt, but still, cover versions of old R&B songs – which we didn't really feel we were doing justice, to be perfectly honest".

"Under My Thumb"
A 20-second sample of the song, featuring marimba textures by Jones and guitar figures played by Richards in a low tessitura – both departures from the conventions of the band's earlier blues-based rock music.

Along with their 1967 follow-up, Between the Buttons, Aftermath is cited by Malvinni as part of the Rolling Stones' pop-rock period as it features a chordal range more diverse and inclusive of minor chords than their blues-based recordings. Pat Gilbert of Mojo stated that the album is defined by its "thoughtfully crafted pop songs, fleshed out with exotic instruments including sitar, dulcimer, harpsichord, marimbas and bells". According to Kevin Courrier, the Stones use "softly intricate" arrangements that lend the record a "seductive ambience" similar to Rubber Soul, particularly on "Lady Jane", "I Am Waiting", "Under My Thumb" and "Out of Time". The latter two songs, among Aftermath's more standard pop-rock titles, are often-cited examples of Jones interweaving unconventional instruments and quirky sounds into the album's sonic character, his use of the marimba featured on both. In the opinion of Philip Norman, Jones' varied contributions give Aftermath both the "chameleon colours" associated with Swinging London fashion and a "visual quality" unlike any other Stones album. Robert Christgau says the texture of the Stones' blues-derived hard rock is "permanently enriched" as Jones "daub[s] on occult instrumental [colours]", Watts "mold[s] jazz chops to rock forms", Richards "rock[s] roughly on" and the band "as a whole learn[s] to respect and exploit (never revere) studio nuance"; Wyman's playing here is described by Sheffield as the "funkiest" on a Stones LP.

Citing individual songs, Rolling Stone describes Aftermath as "an expansive collection of tough riffs ('It's Not Easy') and tougher acoustic blues ('High and Dry'); of zooming psychedelia ('Paint It Black'), baroque-folk gallantry ('I Am Waiting') and epic groove (the eleven minutes of 'Goin' Home')". Jon Savage also highlights the stylistic diversity of the album, saying that it "range[s] from modern madrigals ('Lady Jane'), music-hall ragas ('Mother's Little Helper'), strange, curse-like dirges ('I Am Waiting') and uptempo pop ('Think') to several bone-dry blues mutations ('High and Dry', 'Flight 505' [and] 'Going Home')". The first four songs of Aftermath's US edition – "Paint It Black", "Stupid Girl", "Lady Jane" and "Under My Thumb" – are identified by the music academic James Perone as its most explicit attempts to transcend the blues-based rock and roll conventions of the Stones' past. He also notes how Richards' guitar riff and solo on the latter track are "minimalistic, in a fairly low tessitura and relatively emotionless", compared to previous Stones hits like "(I Can't Get No) Satisfaction", "Get Off of My Cloud" and "19th Nervous Breakdown".

== Lyrics and themes ==
Overall, the darker themes lead Margotin and Guesdon to call Aftermath "a sombre album in which desolation, paranoia, despair and frustration are echoed as track succeeds track". According to Steven Hyden, Jagger's songwriting explores "sex as pleasure, sex as power, love disguised as hate and hate disguised as love". Sheffield believes the time period's flower power ideology is recast in a dark light on "these tough, lean, desperately lonely songs", while Norman calls them "songs of callow male triumph" in which Jagger alternately displays childlike charm and misogynistic scorn. While songs such as "Stupid Girl" and "Under My Thumb" may be misogynistic, they are also interpreted as dark representations of the narrator's hateful masculinity. Misogyny, as on "Under My Thumb", "may be just a tool for restoring the fragile narcissism and arrogance of the male narrator", muses the music scholar Norma Coates.

Referring to the American version of the LP, Perone identifies numerous musical and lyrical features that lend Aftermath a conceptual unity which, although not sufficient for it to be considered a concept album, allows for the record to be understood "as a psychodrama around the theme of love, desire and obsession that never quite turns out right". It may also be read "as part of a dark male fantasy world, perhaps constructed as a means of dealing with loneliness caused by a broken relationship or a series of broken relationships with women." As Perone explains:

The individual songs seem to ping-pong back and forth between themes of love/desire for women and the desire to control women and out-and-out misogyny. However, the band uses musical connections between songs as well as the subtheme of travel, the use of feline metaphors for women and other lyrical connections to suggest that the characters whom lead singer Mick Jagger portrays throughout the album are really one and perhaps stem from the deep recesses of his psyche.

=== Female characters ===
It was almost as if women in all their contradictory humanity symbolised the conditions of life that were the ultimate target of the Stones' anger.

— Robert Christgau (1972)

Aftermath's diverse musical style contrasts the dark themes explored in Jagger and Richards' lyrics, which often scorn female lovers. Margotin and Guesdon say that Jagger, who had been accused of misogyny before the album, is avenging real-life grievances with the songs, using "language and imagery that had the power to hurt". "Stupid Girl", which assails the "supposed greed and facile certitudes of women", is speculated by the writers to indirectly criticise Shrimpton. "High and Dry" expresses a cynical outlook on a lost romantic connection, while "Under My Thumb", "Out of Time" and "Think" show how "a man's revenge on his mistress (or perhaps wife) becomes a source of real pleasure". Shrimpton was devastated by the lyrics to "Out of Time", in which Jagger sings, "You're obsolete, my baby, my poor old-fashioned baby". (Note: She was also devastated by the withering depiction of a neurotic girl in "19th Nervous Breakdown".) Savage views such songs as evoking "the nastiness of the Rolling Stones' constructed image" in lyrical form by capturing Jagger's antipathy towards Shrimpton, whom he describes as a "feisty upper-middle-class girl who gave as good as she got". Conceding that male chauvinism became a key theme of the Stones' lyrics from late 1965 onwards, Richards later told Bockris: "It was all a spin-off from our environment ... hotels and too many dumb chicks. Not all dumb, not by any means, but that's how one got. You got really cut off."

In Guesdon and Margotin's view, the Stones express a more compassionate attitude towards women in "Mother's Little Helper", which examines a housewife's reliance on pharmaceutical drugs to cope with her daily life, and in "Lady Jane"'s story of romantic courtship. By contrast, Davis writes of Aftermath containing a "blatant attack on motherhood" and says that "Mother's Little Helper" addresses "tranquilised suburban housewives". According to Hassinger, his wife Marie provided the inspiration for "Mother's Little Helper" when she supplied some downers in response to a request from one of the studio staff. Davis likens "Lady Jane" to a Tudor love song with lyrics apparently inspired by Henry VIII's love letters to Lady Jane Seymour. Some listeners assumed the song was about Jagger's high-society friend Jane Ormsby-Gore, daughter of David Ormsby-Gore, 5th Baron Harlech. In what the music journalist Chris Salewicz terms a "disingenuous" claim, Jagger told Shrimpton that "Lady Jane" was written for her.

=== Social themes ===
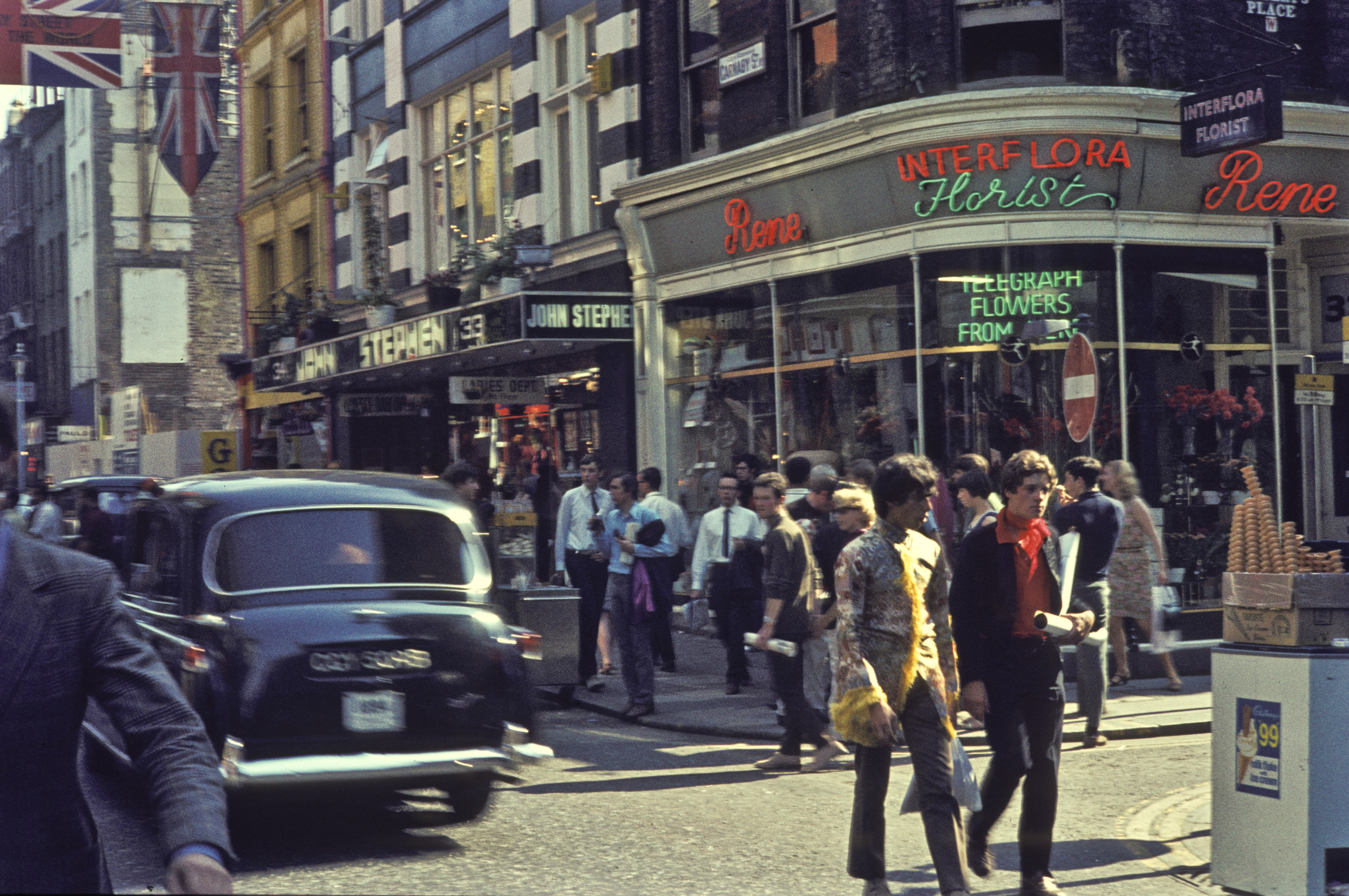
Carnaby Street, 1968. Aftermath captured the Rolling Stones' engagement with the burgeoning Swinging London youth scene.

According to the music historian Simon Philo, like all the Stones' 1966 releases, Aftermath also reflects the band's "engagement" with Swinging London, a scene in which their decadent image afforded them a pre-eminent role by capturing the meritocratic ideals of youth, looks and wealth over social class. Author Ian MacDonald says that, as on Between the Buttons, the Stones perform here as storytellers of the scene and produce a "subversive" kind of pop music comparable to their contemporaries the Kinks. As Greil Marcus observes, the songs' protagonists can be interpreted as London bohemians severely disdainful of bourgeois comfort, positing "a duel between the sexes" and weaponizing humour and derision. Courrier adds that, as the "evil twin" of Rubber Soul, Aftermath takes that album's "romantic scepticism" and reframes it into a narrative of "underclass revolt".

Both "Mother's Little Helper" and "What to Do" connect modern society to feelings of unhappiness. The band's misgivings about their rock stardom are also touched on, including relentless concert tours in "Goin' Home" and fans who imitate them in "Doncha Bother Me", in which Jagger sings, "The lines around my eyes are protected by copyright law". Savage views the same lyric, preceded by the lines "All the clubs and the bars / And the little red cars / Not knowing why, but trying to get high", as the Stones' cynical take on Swinging London at a time when the phenomenon was receiving international attention and being presented as a tourist attraction. According to Perone, "I Am Waiting" suggests paranoia on the narrator's part and that societal forces are the cause, yet the song presents a degree of resignation in comparison to the album's other commentaries on class- and consumer-focused society.

== Title and packaging ==
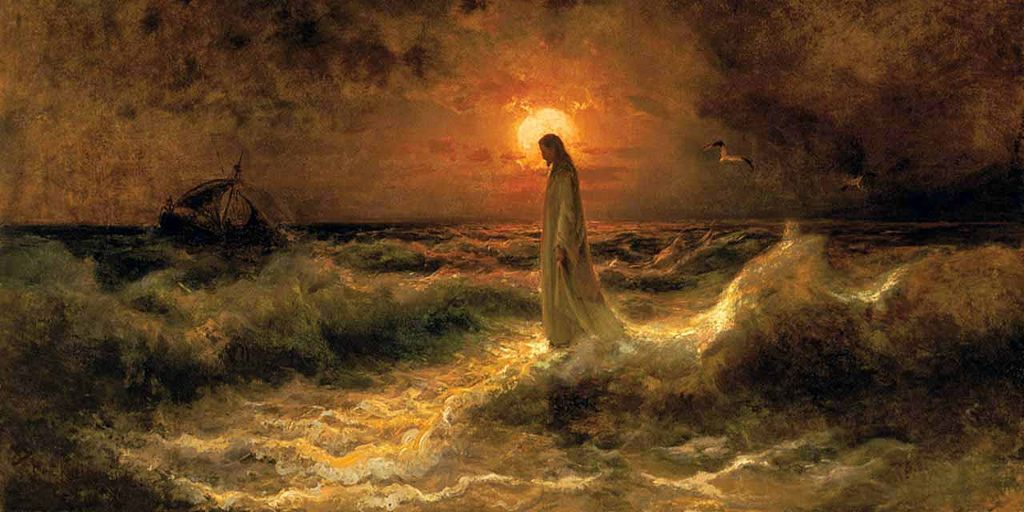
The preliminary title and cover were rejected by the Stones' record label for alluding to Jesus walking on water. (Christ Walking on the Water by Julius von Klever, c. 1880, shown above)

During the recording, Oldham wanted Could You Walk on the Water? to be the album's title. In mid-January 1966, the British press announced that a new Rolling Stones LP carrying that title would be released on 10 March. In Rolling with the Stones, Wyman refers to the announcement as "audacity" on Oldham's part, although he supposes that Could You Walk on the Water? was their manager's proposed title for the band's March compilation album Big Hits (High Tide and Green Grass), rather than for Aftermath. At the time, Richards complained that Oldham was continually trying to "[get] in on the act" and "the Stones have practically become a projection of his own ego." A Decca spokesman said the company would not issue an album with such a title "at any price"; Oldham's idea upset executives at the company's American distributor, London Records, who feared the allusion to Jesus walking on water would provoke a negative response from Christians.

The title controversy embroiled the Stones in a conflict with Decca, delaying Aftermath's release from March to April 1966. Oldham had also proposed the idea of producing a deluxe gatefold featuring six pages of colour photos from the Stones' recent American tour and a cover depicting the band walking atop a California reservoir in the manner of "pop messiahs on the Sea of Galilee", as Davis describes. Rejected by Decca, the packaging was used instead for the US version of Big Hits, albeit with a cover showing the band standing on the shore of the reservoir. According to Davis, "in the bitterness (over lack of control of their work) that followed, the album was called Aftermath for want of another concept." Rolling Stone discerns a connection between the final title and themes explored in the music: "Aftermath of what? of the whirlwind fame that had resulted from releasing five albums in two years, for one thing ... And of hypocritical women". In Norman's view, an "aftermath" of the earlier title's "sacrilegious reference to the most spectacular of Christ's miracles" is "the very thing from which their God-fearing bosses may well have saved them", effectively avoiding the international furore that John Lennon created with his remark, in March, that the Beatles are "more popular than Jesus".

The front cover photo for Aftermath's British release was taken by Guy Webster and the cover design was done by Oldham, credited as "Sandy Beach". Instead of the elaborate essay that Oldham usually supplied for the Stones' albums, the liner notes were written by Hassinger and were a straight commentary on the music. Hassinger wrote in part: "It's been great working with the Stones, who, contrary to the countless jibes of mediocre comedians all over the world, are real professionals, and a gas to work with." For the cover image, close-ups of the band members' faces were diagonally aligned against a pale-pink and black coloured background, and the album title was cut in half across a line break. The back of the LP featured four black-and-white photos of the group taken by Jerry Schatzberg at his photographic studio in New York in February 1966. Jones was vocal in his dislike of Oldham's design when interviewed by Melody Maker in April.

For the American edition's cover, David Bailey took a colour photo of Jones and Richards in front of Jagger, Watts and Wyman, and set it against a blurred black background. According to Margotin and Guesdon, the photo was intentionally blurred as "an allusion to the psychedelic movement" and "corresponds better to the Stones' new artistic direction". (Note: Jagger was among the pop musicians and other leading creative figures of contemporary London that Bailey included in his collection of monochrome photographic portraits, Box of Pin-Ups, published in November 1965.)

== Marketing and sales ==
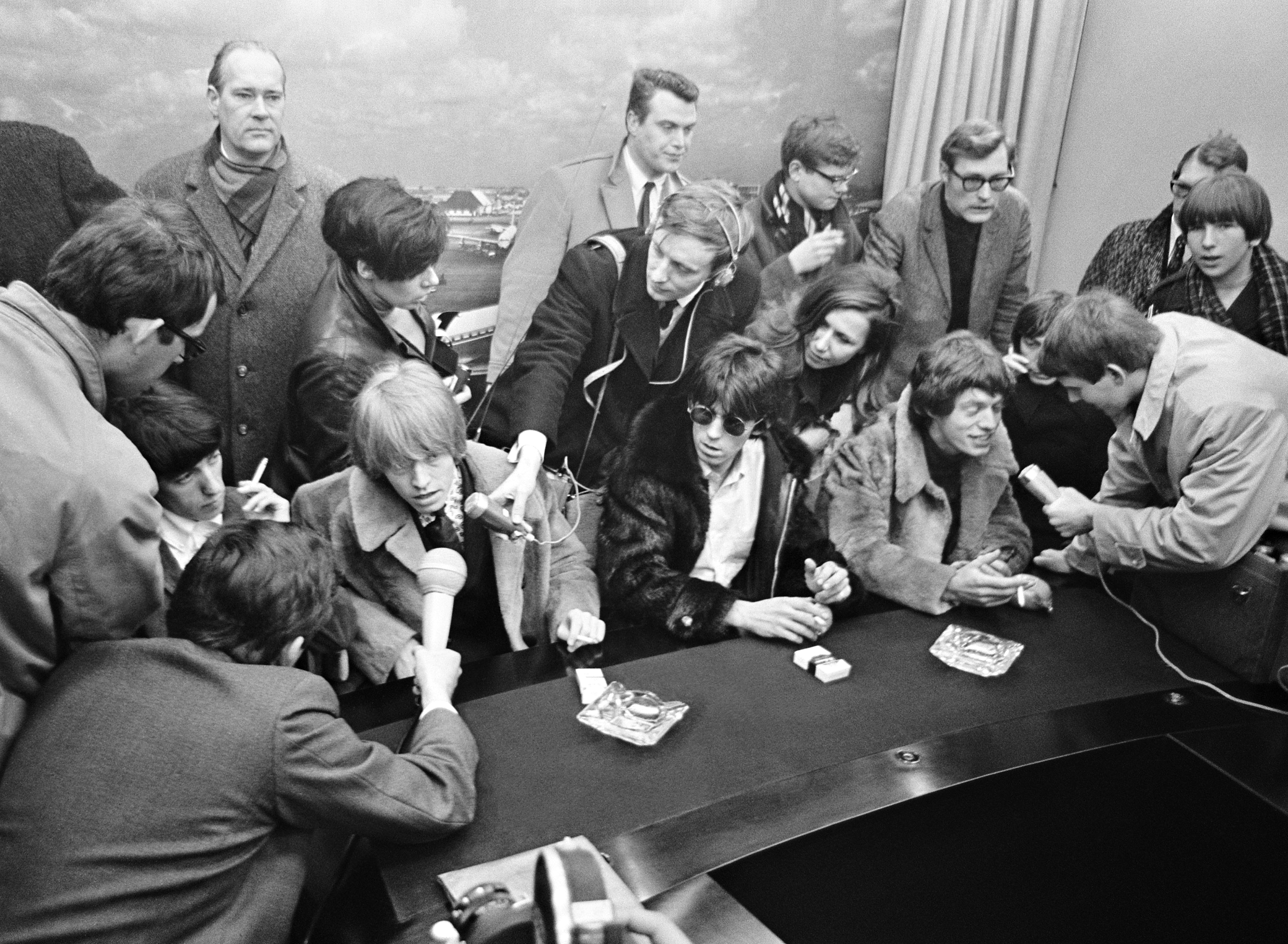
Seated left to right: Bill Wyman, Jones, Richards and Jagger, interviewed by music press in Amsterdam's Schiphol Airport while on tour shortly before Aftermath's release

Aftermath's release was preceded by the Rolling Stones' two-week tour of Europe, which began on 25 March 1966. Decca issued the album in the United Kingdom on 15 April and an accompanying press release that declared: "We look to Shakespeare and Dickens and Chaucer for accounts of other times in our history, and we feel that tomorrow we will on many occasions look to the gramophone records of the Rolling Stones ... who act as a mirror for today's mind, action and happenings." On the same day, Time magazine published a feature titled "London: A Swinging City", belatedly recognising the Swinging London phenomenon a year after its peak. The British edition of Aftermath featured a run-time of 52 minutes and 23 seconds, the longest for a popular music LP at that time. The record was pressed with reduced volume to allow for its unusual length. In the Netherlands, Phonogram Records rush-released the album during the week of 14 May in response to high demand from Dutch music retailers.

In the US, London delayed the album's release to market the Big Hits compilation first but issued "Paint It Black" as a single in May. The song was originally released as "Paint It, Black", the comma being an error by Decca, which stirred controversy over a purported racial connotation. The band began their fifth North American tour on 24 June in support of Aftermath; it was their highest-grossing tour yet and, according to Richards, the start of a period of rapprochement between Jones, Jagger and himself. In late June, London released the American edition of the album with "Paint It Black" replacing "Mother's Little Helper", which was released in the same period in the US as a single with "Lady Jane" as the B-side. (Note: Some sources date the US release of Aftermath to 1 or 2 July, but most write it was June. Margotin and Guesdon acknowledge Wyman's dating of 2 July, but they instead specify it was 20 June. The album entered the US chart compiled by Billboard magazine on 9 July.) "Out of Time", "Take It or Leave It" and "What to Do" were similarly cut from the US LP's running order in an effort to significantly reduce its length, in keeping with the industry policy of issuing shorter albums and maximising the amount of LP releases for popular artists. (Note: "Out of Time" and "Take It or Leave It" remained unreleased in the US until June 1967, when they were included on the London Records album Flowers. "What to Do" was eventually released on the 1972 American compilation More Hot Rocks (Big Hits & Fazed Cookies).) Aftermath was the band's fourth British and sixth American studio album.

In the UK, Aftermath topped the Record Retailer LPs chart (subsequently adopted as the UK Albums Chart) for eight consecutive weeks, replacing the soundtrack album for The Sound of Music (1965) at number 1. It stayed on the chart for 28 weeks. Aftermath proved the fourth-highest-selling album of 1966 in the UK, and it also became a top-10 best-seller in the Netherlands. In the US, the album entered the Billboard Top LPs at number 117 on 2 July, making it the chart's highest new entry that week. By 13 August, it had risen to number 2 behind the Beatles' Yesterday and Today. That month, the Recording Industry Association of America awarded Aftermath a Gold certification for shipments of 500,000 copies; in 1989 it was certified Platinum for one million copies.

According to the pop historian Richard Havers, Aftermath's 1966 US chart run was assisted by the success of "Paint It Black", which topped the Billboard Hot 100 for two weeks in June. "Mother's Little Helper" was a Hot 100 hit as well, peaking at number 8 on the chart. The album's songs also proved popular among other recording artists, "Mother's Little Helper", "Take It or Leave It", "Under My Thumb" and "Lady Jane" all being covered within a month of Aftermath's release. Adding to Jagger and Richards' success as writers, Chris Farlowe topped the UK charts with his Jagger-produced recording of "Out of Time" in August. (Note: Farlowe's single was released on Immediate Records, a new Oldham business venture that allowed Jagger and Richards to produce records for the first time.)

== Critical reception ==
Aftermath received highly favourable reviews in the music press. It was released just months before Bob Dylan's Blonde on Blonde and the Beatles' Revolver, albums by artists that Jagger and Richards had received comparisons to while Oldham was promoting the band's artistic maturation to the press. Among British critics, Richard Green of Record Mirror, in April 1966, began his review by saying: "Whether they realise it or not – and I think Andrew Oldham does – the Rolling Stones have on their hands the smash LP of the year with Aftermath", adding that it would take much effort to surpass their achievement. Green said the music is unmistakably rock and roll and was especially impressed by Watts' drumming. Keith Altham of the New Musical Express (NME) hailed the Stones as "masterminds behind the electric machines" who have recorded an LP of "the finest value for money ever". He described "Goin' Home" as a "fantastic R&B improvisation" and said that "Lady Jane", "Under My Thumb" and "Mother's Little Helper" have the potential to be great singles. Aftermath was regarded in Melody Maker as the group's best LP to date and one that would "effortlessly take Britain by storm". The magazine's reviewer applauded its focus "on big beat, power and interesting 'sounds'", noting how the use of dulcimer, sitar, organ, harpsichord, marimba and fuzz boxes creates an "overwhelming variety of atmospherics and tones".

While the lyrics' derisive attitude to women offended some listeners, this aspect received little attention in the British pop press or complaints from female fans. (Note: Davis writes, however, that Aftermath was a source of embarrassment for Shrimpton, since "people generally identified her with the [album's] scathing put-downs", and that it led to an argument she and Jagger had while attending a party hosted by Guinness heir Tara Browne in April 1966.) In the cultural journal New Left Review, Alan Beckett wrote that the band's lyrics could only be fully appreciated by an audience familiar with modern city life, particularly London. He said that the Stones' "archetypal girl", as first introduced in their 1965 song "Play with Fire", was "rich, spoiled, confused, weak, using drugs, etc.", adding that: "Anyone who has been around Chelsea or Kensington can put at least one name to this character." Responding in the same publication, the intellectual historian Perry Anderson (using the pseudonym of Richard Merton) defended the band's message as an audacious and satirical exposé on sexual inequality. He said that in songs such as "Stupid Girl" and "Under My Thumb", the Stones had "defied a central taboo of the social system" and that "they have done so in the most radical and unacceptable way possible: by celebrating it." (Note: Anderson used the pseudonym in his brief endeavor into rock criticism, which the sociologist Gregory Elliott later described as a prudent move because Anderson's preferences – for the Stones over the Beatles, and for the Beach Boys over Bob Dylan – were "curios of the counterculture".)

Some feminist writers defended "Under My Thumb". Camille Paglia considered the song "a work of art", despite its sexist lyrics, and Aftermath a "great album" with "rich sonorities". (Note: In 1970, Paglia defended "Under My Thumb" in an exchange with members of the New Haven Women's Liberation Rock Band, who she recounted "went into a rage, surrounded me, practically spat in my face" and "cornered me with my back against the wall" before telling her, "Nothing that demeans woman can be art." Addressing the incident in an interview for Reason magazine, Paglia says, "Now, as a student of art history, how can you have any dialogue with these people? That is the Nazi and Stalinist view of art, where art is subordinate to a pre-fab political agenda." She explains that such incidents contributed to her exclusion from the women's movement.) In a 1973 piece for Creem, Patti Smith recounted her response to the album in 1966: "The Aftermath album was the real move. two faced woman. doncha bother me. the singer displays contempt for his lady. he's on top and that's what I like. then he raises her as queen. his obsession is her. 'goin home.' What a song ... stones music is screwing music."

Among US commentators, Bryan Gray wrote in the Deseret News: "This album does the best job yet of alienating the over-twenties. The reason – they attempt to sing." Record World's review panel selected the album as one of their three "Albums of the Week", predicting a major seller while highlighting "Paint It Black" as "only the first of a series of hot [tracks]". Billboard's reviewer predicted that Aftermath would become another hit for the Stones, citing "Paint It Black" as the focal point of the hard rock album and revering Oldham for his production. Cash Box was extremely impressed by the LP and also predicted immediate chart success, saying "Lady Jane" and "Goin' Home" in particular are likely to attract considerable notice. Writing in Esquire in 1967, Robert Christgau said that the Stones' records present the only possible challenge to Rubber Soul's place as "an album that for innovation, tightness and lyrical intelligence" far surpassed any previous work in popular music. About two years later, in Stereo Review, he included the American Aftermath in his basic rock "library" of 25 albums and attributed the Stones' artistic identity largely to Jagger, "whose power, subtlety and wit are unparalleled in contemporary popular music". While suggesting Jagger and Richards rank second behind John Lennon and Paul McCartney as composers of melody in rock, Christgau still considered it the best album in any category and wrote:

Rock aficionados class the Stones with the Beatles, but perhaps they haven't impressed a wider audience because their devotion to the music is pure: the Hollyridge Strings will never record an album of Jagger–Richard melodies. But for anyone willing to discard his preconceptions, Aftermath is a great experience, a distillation of everything that rock and blues are about. (Note: Christgau later wrote a letter to Stereo Review, charging the magazine's editor with deleting and altering the contents of his article, including his concluding statement on Aftermath: "Let me insist that I do not consider the Rolling Stones' Aftermath 'the best album of its kind,' as your editor would have it. I consider it quite simply the best.")

== Legacy ==
=== Cultural impact ===
Aftermath is often considered one of the most important of the Rolling Stones' early albums. It was an inaugural release of the album era, during which the LP replaced the single as the primary product and form of artistic expression in popular music. As with Rubber Soul, the extent of Aftermath's commercial success foiled the music industry's attempts to re-establish the LP market as the domain of wealthier, adult record-buyers – a plan that had been driven by the industry's disapproval of the uncouth image associated with Jagger and their belief that young record-buyers were more concerned with singles. In Malvinni's opinion, Aftermath was "the crucial step for the Stones' conquering of the pop world and their much-needed answer" to Rubber Soul, which had similarly embodied the emergence of youth culture in popular music during the mid-1960s. (Note: In tribute to Aftermath, the Beatles jokingly considered naming their next album After Geography. The title of Rubber Soul had come about through Paul McCartney overhearing black American musicians describing Jagger's singing as "plastic soul".) With their continued commercial success, the Stones joined the Beatles and the Who as one of the few rock acts who were able to follow their own artistic direction and align themselves with London's elite bohemian scene without alienating the wider youth audience or appearing to compromise their working-class values. Speaking on the cultural impact of Aftermath's British release in 1966, Margotin and Guesdon say it was, "in a sense, the soundtrack of Swinging London, a gift to hip young people" and "one of the brightest stars of the new culture (or counterculture) that was to reach its zenith the following year in the Summer of Love".

Aftermath follows directly in the wake of the Stones' trilogy of songs based on their American Experience: "(I Can't Get No) Satisfaction", "Get Off of My Cloud" and "19th Nervous Breakdown", and it establishes that they had gained sufficient confidence in their own writing prowess to present an album of all-original material. Though perhaps they weren't aware of it then, their initial adrenalin rush (which had sustained them for three years) was just about exhausted. However, the sheer momentum of their struggle for Stateside supremacy enabled them to pull off this coup de grace without showing any signs of artistic fatigue.

— Roy Carr (1976)

Aftermath is regarded as the most artistically formative of the Rolling Stones' early work. Their new sound on the album helped expand their following by the thousands, while its content solidified their dark image. As Ritchie Unterberger observes, its contemptuous perspective about society and women contributed significantly to the group's reputation as "the bad boys" of rock music. According to John Mendelsohn from PopMatters, the social commentary of "Mother's Little Helper" in particular "cemented their reputation as a subversive cultural force", as it exposed the hypocrisy of mainstream culture's exclusive association of psychoactive drug use with addicts and rock stars. The NME's Jazz Monroe writes that Aftermath simultaneously disowned and reimagined rock tradition and forever elevated the Stones as equals to the Beatles. Writing for The A.V. Club, Hyden describes it as "a template for every classic Stones album that came afterward", crediting its "sarcastic, dark and casually shocking" songs with introducing themes Jagger would explore further in the future through a "complex, slippery persona" that allowed him to "be good and evil, man and woman, tough and tender, victim and victimiser". This deliberately "confounding, complicated image" helped make Jagger one of the most captivating lead musicians in rock, Hyden concludes.

=== Influence on rock music ===
The album proved influential in the development of rock music. Its dark content pioneered the darker psychological and social themes of glam rock and British punk rock in the 1970s. The music historian Nicholas Schaffner, in The British Invasion: From the First Wave to the New Wave (1982), acknowledges the Stones on the album for being the first recording act to engage themes of sex, drugs and rock culture "with both a measure of intelligence and a corresponding lack of sentimentality or even romanticism". The attitude of songs like "Paint It Black" in particular influenced punk's nihilistic outlook. Elvis Costello called his album This Year's Model (1978) "a ghost version of Aftermath" and called "This Year's Girl" an answer song to "Stupid Girl".

Some of Aftermath's blues-oriented rock elements foreshadowed the blues-rock music of the late 1960s. Schaffner suggests "Goin' Home" anticipated the trend of extended musical improvisations by professional rock bands, while Rob Young of Uncut says it heralded "the approaching psychedelic tide" in the manner of Rubber Soul. Summarising Aftermath's impact in 2017, the pop culture writer Judy Berman describes "Paint It Black" as "rock's most nihilistic hit to date" and concludes that, "with Jones ditching his guitar for a closetful of exotic instruments and the band channelling their touring musicians' homesickness on the record's 11-minute culminating blues jam, 'Goin' Home,' they also pushed rock forward."

=== Reappraisal ===
Retrospective professional reviews
Review scores
Source	Rating
AllMusic	5/5 stars
Blender	5/5 stars
Encyclopedia of Popular Music	UK: US:
Entertainment Weekly	A–
The Great Rock Discography	7/10
MusicHound Rock	5/5
Music Story	5/5 stars
NME	7/10
The Rolling Stone Album Guide	5/5 stars
Tom Hull – on the Web	UK: A− US: A

Aftermath is often considered the Rolling Stones' first classic album. According to Stephen Davis, its standing as the first wholly Jagger-Richards collection makes it, "for serious fans, the first real Rolling Stones album". Schaffner says it is "the most creative" and possibly the best of their albums "in the first five years", while Hyden cites it as their "first full-fledged masterpiece". Writing for Uncut, Ian MacDonald recognises it as an "early peak" in the Stones' career, and Jody Rosen, in a "Back Catalogue" feature for Blender, includes it as the first of the group's "essential" albums. The Guardian's Alexis Petridis names Aftermath the Stones' fifth-best record, while Graeme Ross of The Independent ranks it sixth and suggests it stands on a level with other benchmark LPs from 1966, including Blonde on Blonde, Revolver and the Beach Boys' Pet Sounds. In The Rolling Stone Illustrated History of Rock & Roll (1976), Christgau names Aftermath the first in a series of Stones LPs – including Between the Buttons, Beggars Banquet (1968) and Let It Bleed (1969) – that stand "among the greatest rock albums". In MusicHound Rock (1999), Greg Kot highlights Jones' "canny" instrumental contributions while identifying Aftermath as the album that transformed the Stones from British blues "traditionalists" into canonical artists of the album-rock era, alongside the Beatles and Bob Dylan. In a retrospective review for AllMusic, Unterberger applauds the band's use of influences from Dylan and psychedelia on "Paint It Black", and similarly praises "Under My Thumb", "Lady Jane" and "I Am Waiting" as masterpieces.

In 2002, both versions of Aftermath were digitally remastered as part of ABKCO Records' reissue campaign of the Rolling Stones' 1960s albums. Reviewing the reissues for Entertainment Weekly, David Browne recommends the UK version over the US, while Rob Sheffield, in his appraisal in The Rolling Stone Album Guide (2004), prefers the US edition for its replacement of "Mother's Little Helper" with "Paint It Black" and highlights the clever lyrics of Jagger. Colin Larkin, who rates the British version higher in his Encyclopedia of Popular Music (2011), describes Aftermath as "a breakthrough work in a crucial year" and an album that demonstrates a flexibility in the group's writing and musical styles as well as "signs of the band's inveterate misogyny". In their book The Beatles vs. The Rolling Stones: Sound Opinions on the Great Rock 'n' Roll Rivalry (2010), Jim DeRogatis and Greg Kot agree that Aftermath is "the first really great Stones album beginning to end", with DeRogatis especially impressed by the British edition's first half of songs.

The pop culture author Shawn Levy, in his 2002 book Ready, Steady, Go!: Swinging London and the Invention of Cool, says that, unlike the three previous Stones albums, Aftermath displayed "purpose" in its sequencing and "a real sense that a coherent vision was at work" in the manner of the Beatles' Rubber Soul. However, he adds that with the August 1966 release of Revolver, Aftermath appeared "limp, tame, dated". (Note: In Simon Philo's description, Revolver announced "underground London"'s arrival in pop, supplanting the sound associated with Swinging London.) Young believes its reputation as a work on-par with Rubber Soul is undeserved since the quality of its songs is inconsistent, the production is "relatively straight" and the assorted stylistic approach ensures it lacks the unifying aspect of the period's other major LPs. Discussing the album's critical legacy for PopMatters, Mendelsohn and Eric Klinger echo this sentiment while agreeing that it is more of a transitional work for the Stones and not up to the level of the albums from their subsequent "golden years" – Beggars Banquet, Let It Bleed, Sticky Fingers (1971) and Exile on Main St. (1972). In an article for Clash celebrating Aftermath's 40th anniversary, Simon Harper concedes that its artistic standing alongside the Beatles' contemporaneous works may be debatable but, "as the rebirth of the world's greatest rock and roll band, its importance is undisputed."

Some retrospective appraisals are critical towards the harsh treatment of female characters on the album. As Schaffner remarks, "the brutal thrust of such ditties as 'Stupid Girl,' 'Under My Thumb' and 'Out of Time' has since, of course, induced paroxysms of rage among feminists." Young infers that the album's principal lyrical theme now evokes a "rather old-fashioned sensation of brattish, spiky misogyny", presenting female characters as "pill-popping housewives ... the idiotic hussy ... the 'obsolete' fashion dummy ... or the subjugated arm candy". Berman also singles out this aspect in her otherwise positive estimation of Aftermath, saying it "indulged the Stones' misogyny on the bitchy diss track 'Stupid Girl' and tamed a shrew on 'Under My Thumb,' a nasty piece of work". Unterberger expresses similar reservations about the substance behind songs like "Goin' Home" and "Stupid Girl", finding the latter particularly callow.

=== Rankings ===
Aftermath frequently appears on professional rankings of the best albums. In 1987, it was voted 68th in Paul Gambaccini's book Critics' Choice: The Top 100 Rock 'n' Roll Albums of All Time, based on submissions from an international panel of 81 critics, writers and broadcasters. In contemporaneous rankings of the greatest albums, the Dutch OOR, the British Sounds and the Irish Hot Press placed it as 17th, 61st and 85th, respectively. In 2000, it was voted number 387 in Colin Larkin's All Time Top 1000 Albums. In 2003, Rolling Stone ranked the American edition at number 108 on the magazine's "500 Greatest Albums of All Time" list. (Note: The magazine ranked the album at number 109 in the 2012 revised edition of the list and at number 330 in its 2020 revision.) In 2017, Pitchfork listed Aftermath at number 98 on the website's "200 Best Albums of the 1960s".

The album is also highlighted in popular record guides. It is named in Greil Marcus' 1979 anthology Stranded as one of his "Treasure Island" albums, comprising a personal discography of rock music's first 25 years. The American edition of the album is included in "A Basic Record Library" of 1950s and 1960s recordings published in Christgau's Record Guide: Rock Albums of the Seventies (1981). The same version appears in James Perone's book The Album: A Guide to Pop Music's Most Provocative, Influential and Important Creations (2012) and in Chris Smith's 101 Albums That Changed Popular Music (2009), albeit in the latter's appendix "Ten Albums That Almost Made It". In addition, Aftermath features in Bill Shapiro's 1991 Rock & Roll Review: A Guide to Good Rock on CD (listed in its section on "The Top 100 Rock Compact Discs"), Chuck Eddy's The Accidental Evolution of Rock'n'roll (1997), the 2006 Greenwood Encyclopedia of Rock History's "Most Significant Rock Albums", and Robert Dimery's 1001 Albums You Must Hear Before You Die (2010).

== Track listing ==
=== UK edition ===
All tracks are written by Mick Jagger and Keith Richards. (Note: On Oldham's suggestion, Richards' name was spelled without the s for most of the 1960s and 70s. Both the UK and US editions of Aftermath therefore credit all songs to "Jagger, Richard".)

Side one
No.	Title	Length
1.	"Mother's Little Helper"	2:40
2.	"Stupid Girl"	2:52
3.	"Lady Jane"	3:06
4.	"Under My Thumb"	3:20
5.	"Doncha Bother Me"	2:35
6.	"Goin' Home"	11:18
Total length:		25:51

Side two
No.	Title	Length
1.	"Flight 505"	3:25
2.	"High and Dry"	3:06
3.	"Out of Time"	5:15
4.	"It's Not Easy"	2:52
5.	"I Am Waiting"	3:10
6.	"Take It or Leave It"	2:47
7.	"Think"	3:10
8.	"What to Do"	2:30
Total length:		26:15

- ABKCO's 2002 SACD remaster of the UK edition was released with an otherwise unavailable stereo mix of "Mother's Little Helper".

=== US edition ===
All tracks are written by Mick Jagger and Keith Richards.

Side one
No.	Title	Length
1.	"Paint It Black"	3:46
2.	"Stupid Girl"	2:52
3.	"Lady Jane"	3:06
4.	"Under My Thumb"	3:20
5.	"Doncha Bother Me"	2:35
6.	"Think"	3:10
Total length:		18:49

Side two
No.	Title	Length
1.	"Flight 505"	3:25
2.	"High and Dry"	3:06
3.	"It's Not Easy"	2:52
4.	"I Am Waiting"	3:10
5.	"Goin' Home"	11:18
Total length:		23:51

Notes

- The timings of "Paint It Black" and "Goin' Home" on the CD reissue are incorrect.
- "Paint It Black" was originally mistitled "Paint It, Black"

== Personnel ==
Credits are from the 2002 CD booklet and contributions listed in Philippe Margotin and Jean-Michel Guesdon's book All the Songs, except where noted otherwise.

The Rolling Stones

- Mick Jagger – lead and backing vocals, percussion; harmonica ("Doncha Bother Me")
- Keith Richards – harmony and backing vocals, electric and acoustic guitars; fuzz bass ("Under My Thumb", "Flight 505", "It's Not Easy")
- Brian Jones – electric and acoustic guitars; sitar ("Paint It Black"), dulcimer ("Lady Jane", "I Am Waiting"), harmonica ("Goin' Home", "High and Dry"), marimba ("Under My Thumb", "Out of Time"), vibraphone ("Out of Time"), (Note: Margotin & Guesdon are uncertain if Jones is playing a vibraphone, and suggest it may actually be a metallophone.) koto ("Take It or Leave It")
- Bill Wyman – bass guitar, fuzz bass ("Mother's Little Helper"); organ ("Paint It Black"), marimba, bells
- Charlie Watts – drums, percussion, marimba, bells

Additional musicians

- Jack Nitzsche – piano, organ, harpsichord, percussion
- Ian Stewart – piano, organ

Additional personnel

- David Bailey – photography (US edition)
- Dave Hassinger – engineering
- Andrew Loog Oldham – production, cover design (UK edition)
- Jerry Schatzberg – photography
- Guy Webster – photography (UK edition)

== Charts ==
=== Weekly charts ===
Chart (1966–67)	Peak position
Australian Albums (Kent Music Report)	2
Canada CHUM's Album Index	1
Finland (Official Finnish Charts)	1
German Albums (Offizielle Top 100)	1
UK Disc and Music Echo Top Ten LPs	1
UK New Musical Express Best Selling LPs	1
UK Record Retailer LPs chart	1
US Billboard 200	2
US Cash Box Top 100 Albums	1
US Record World Top 100 LPs (Note: Record World incorrectly listed the album as The Aftermath.)	1

Chart (2025)	Peak position
Greek Albums (IFPI)	35

=== Year-end charts ===
Chart (1966)	Peak position
US Billboard Year-end	24
US Cash Box Year-end	22

== Certifications ==
Region	Certification	Certified units/sales
United Kingdom (BPI) release of 2006	Gold	100,000^{‡}
United States (RIAA)	Platinum	1,000,000^{^}
^{^} Shipments figures based on certification alone.^{‡} Sales+streaming figures based on certification alone.

== See also ==
- British Invasion
- Classic rock
- List of rock albums

== Bibliography ==
- Altham, Keith (8 April 1966). "The Rolling Stones' most favoured reporter reviews their fourth long-player track by track". New Musical Express.
- Anon. (16 April 1966). "The Rolling Stones: Aftermath (Decca)". Melody Maker – via Rock's Backpages.
- Anon. (23 April 1966). "Top Ten LPs" (PDF). Disc and Music Echo – via WorldRadioHistory.com.
- Anon. (29 April 1966). "Best Selling LPs in Britain" (PDF). New Musical Express. p. 5 – via WorldRadioHistory.com.
- Anon. (2 July 1966). "Albums Reviews". Cash Box.
- Anon. (9 July 1966). "Album Reviews". Billboard – via Google Books.
- Anon. (9 July 1966). "Albums of the Week" (PDF). Record World – via WorldRadioHistory.com.
- Anon. (13 August 1966). "Top 100 Albums". Cash Box.
- Anon. (15 August 1966). "CHUM Hit Parade". CHUM Chart – via ChumTribute.com.
- Anon. (20 August 1966). "100 Top LP's" (PDF). Record World – via WorldRadioHistory.com.
- Anon. (24 December 1966). "Top Records of 1966" (PDF). Billboard – via WorldRadioHistory.com.
- Anon. (24 December 1966). "Best Albums of 1966" (PDF). Cash Box – via WorldRadioHistory.com.
- Anon. (8 July 1995). "Aftermath". NME.
- Anon. (1 January 2001). "The Sixties". The Daily Telegraph. Archived from the original on 27 November 2018.
- Anon. (2002). Aftermath UK (CD booklet). The Rolling Stones. ABKCO Records. 8822952.
- Anon. (2002). Aftermath (CD booklet). The Rolling Stones. ABKCO Records. 94762.
- Anon. (2003). "500 Greatest Albums: Aftermath – The Rolling Stones". Rolling Stone. Archived from the original on 14 August 2011.
- Anon. (2012). "500 Greatest Albums of All Time". Rolling Stone. Archived from the original on 23 October 2019.
- Anon. (17 May 2018). "Aftermath released, 1966". The Daily Telegraph. Archived from the original on 31 August 2018.
- Anon. (22 September 2020). "The 500 Greatest Albums of All Time". Rolling Stone.
- Anon. (n.d.). "British album certifications – The Rolling Stones – Aftermath". British Phonographic Industry. Select albums in the Format field. Select Silver in the Certification field. Type Aftermath in the "Search BPI Awards" field and then press Enter.
- Anon. (n.d.). "Charts-Surfer: Liedsuche" (in German). charts-surfer.de. Archived from the original on 6 March 2012.
- Anon. (n.d.). "Key Dates in the History of the Official UK Charts". Official Charts Company. Archived from the original on 10 January 2008.
- Anon. (n.d.). "UK charts archive". Official Charts Company. Archived from the original on 8 May 2019.
- Anon. (n.d.). "American album certifications – The Rolling Stones – Aftermath". Recording Industry Association of America. If necessary, click Advanced, then click Format, then select Album, then click SEARCH.
- Alvarez, François (n.d.). "Aftermath, The Rolling Stones critique" (in French). Music Story. Archived from the original on 7 January 2010.
- Babiuk, Andy; Prevost, Greg (2013). Rolling Stones Gear: All the Stones' Instruments from Stage to Studio. Milwaukee, Wisconsin: Backbeat Books. ISBN 978-1-61713-092-2.
- Bentley, Mark (December 2010). "A Rolling Stones Miscellany". Uncut Ultimate Music Guide: The Rolling Stones. No. 4.
- Berman, Judy (22 August 2017). "The 200 Best Albums of the 1960s: '98. The Rolling Stones Aftermath (1966)'". Pitchfork. Archived from the original on 25 December 2018.
- Bockris, Victor (1992). Keith Richards: The Unauthorised Biography. London: Hutchinson. ISBN 0-09-174397-4.
- Bonanno, Massimo (1990). The Rolling Stones Chronicle: The First Thirty Years. London: Plexus. ISBN 978-0-85965-135-6.
- Bray, Christopher (2014). 1965: The Year Modern Britain Was Born. London: Simon & Schuster. ISBN 978-1-84983-387-5 – via Google Books.
- Browne, David (20 September 2002). "Satisfaction?". Entertainment Weekly. Archived from the original on 28 November 2018.
- Charone, Barbara (1979). Keith Richards. London: Futura. ISBN 0-7088-1658-4.
- Christgau, Robert (December 1967). "Secular Music". Esquire – via robertchristgau.com.
- Christgau, Robert (March 1969). "A Short and Happy History of Rock". Stereo Review. Archived from the original on 16 December 2019 – via robertchristgau.com.
- Christgau, Robert (1976). "The Rolling Stones". In Miller, Jim (ed.). The Rolling Stone Illustrated History of Rock & Roll. Rolling Stone Press. ISBN 0-394-40327-4 – via robertchristgau.com.
- Christgau, Robert (1981). "A Basic Record Library: The Fifties and Sixties". Christgau's Record Guide: Rock Albums of the Seventies. Ticknor & Fields. ISBN 0-89919-025-1 – via robertchristgau.com.
- Christgau, Robert (1998). Grown Up All Wrong: 75 Great Rock and Pop Artists from Vaudeville to Techno. Harvard University Press. ISBN 0-674-44318-7.
- Christgau, Robert (2000). Any Old Way You Choose It: Rock and Other Pop Music, 1967–1973. Cooper Square Press. ISBN 978-0-8154-1041-6.
- Clayson, Alan (2006). The Rolling Stones Album File & Complete Discography. Cassell Illustrated. ISBN 1-84403-494-1.
- Clayson, Alan (2007). Legendary Sessions: The Rolling Stones: Beggars Banquet. Billboard Books. ISBN 978-0-8230-8397-8.
- Coates, Norma (2019). "How can a smart chick like me listen to the Stones and not throw up? A speculative exploration of Beggars Banquet and misogyny". In Reising, Russell (ed.). Beggars Banquet and the Rolling Stones' Rock and Roll Revolution: 'They Call My Name Disturbance'. Routledge. ISBN 978-1-351-39641-7.
- Courrier, Kevin (2008). Artificial Paradise: The Dark Side of the Beatles' Utopian Dream: The Dark Side of the Beatles' Utopian Dream. ABC-CLIO. ISBN 978-0-313-34587-6.
- Dalton, David (1982). The Rolling Stones. Delilah/Putnam Books. ISBN 0-399-41005-8.
- Davis, Stephen (2001). Old Gods Almost Dead: The 40-Year Odyssey of the Rolling Stones. Crown/Archetype. ISBN 0-7679-0956-9.
- DeRogatis, Jim; Kot, Greg (2010). The Beatles vs. The Rolling Stones: Sound Opinions on the Great Rock 'n' Roll Rivalry. Voyageur Press. ISBN 978-1-61060-513-7.
- Dimery, Robert, ed. (2010). 1001 Albums You Must Hear Before You Die (Revised and updated ed.). Universe. ISBN 978-0-7893-2074-2.
- Elliott, Gregory (1998). Perry Anderson: The Merciless Laboratory of History. U of Minnesota Press. ISBN 0-8166-2966-8.
- Erlewine, Stephen Thomas (n.d.). "The Rolling Stones". AllMusic. Archived from the original on 13 June 2018.
- Fremer, Michael (31 October 2010). "Round and Round: The Sound of The Rolling Stones Part 2". Analog Planet.
- Gillespie, Nick (June 2015). "Everything's Awesome and Camille Paglia Is Unhappy!". Reason.
- Green, Richard (16 April 1966). "The smash LP of the year?". Record Mirror.
- Greenfield, Robert (1981). The Rolling Stone Interviews. St. Martin's Press/Rolling Stone Press. ISBN 978-0-312-68955-1.
- Havers, Richard (13 August 2018). "'Aftermath': The Rolling Stones at the Dawning of Rock". uDiscover. Archived from the original on 29 November 2018.
- Harper, Simon (12 November 2006). "Classic Album: The Rolling Stones – Aftermath". Clash. Archived from the original on 28 November 2018.
- Hegeman, Bas (14 May 1966). "From the Music Capitals of the World – Amsterdam". Billboard. Archived from the original on 30 November 2018 – via Google Books.
- Hull, Tom (n.d.). "Grade List: The Rolling Stones". Tom Hull – on the Web.
- Hyden, Steven (3 April 2008). "Primer: The Rolling Stones". The A.V. Club. Archived from the original on 2 December 2018.
- Jagger, Mick; Richards, Keith; Watts, Charlie; Wood, Ronnie (2003). According to the Rolling Stones. London: Weidenfeld & Nicolson. ISBN 0-297-84332-X.
- Janovitz, Bill (2013). Rocks Off: 50 Tracks That Tell the Story of the Rolling Stones. New York, NY: St. Martin's Press. ISBN 978-1-250-02631-6 – via Google Books.
- King, Colin (2004). Rock On!: The Rock 'n' Roll Greats. Caxton. ISBN 1-84067-473-3.
- Kot, Greg (1999). "The Rolling Stones". In Graff, Gary; Durchholz, Daniel (eds.). MusicHound Rock: The Essential Album Guide. Farmington Hills, MI: Visible Ink Press. ISBN 1-57859-061-2.
- Kubernik, Harvey (December 2015). "Rubber Soul 50 Years On". Rock's Backpages. Archived from the original on 29 June 2019.
- Larkin, Colin (2000). All Time Top 1000 Albums (3rd ed.). Virgin Books. ISBN 0-7535-0493-6.
- Larkin, Colin (2011). Encyclopedia of Popular Music. London: Omnibus Press. ISBN 978-0-85712-595-8.
- Levy, Shawn (2002). Ready, Steady, Go!: Swinging London and the Invention of Cool. London: Fourth Estate. ISBN 978-1-84115-226-4.
- MacDonald, Ian (November 2002). "The Rolling Stones: Play With Fire". Uncut – via Rock's Backpages.
- Malvinni, David (2016). Experiencing the Rolling Stones: A Listener's Companion. Rowman & Littlefield. ISBN 978-0-8108-8920-0.
- Margotin, Philippe; Guesdon, Jean-Michel (2016). The Rolling Stones All the Songs: The Story Behind Every Track. Running Press. ISBN 978-0-316-31773-3.
- Marchese, David (May 2017). "The Complete Works: Ranking All 374 Rolling Stones Songs". Vulture.
- Marcus, Greil (1979). "Treasure Island". Stranded. Knopf. ISBN 0-394-73827-6.
- Marcus, Greil (1980). "The Beatles". In Miller, Jim (ed.). The Rolling Stone Illustrated History of Rock & Roll (Revised and updated ed.). Random House/Rolling Stone Press Book. ISBN 0-394-73938-8.
- Mawer, Sharon (May 2007). "Album Chart History: 1966". The Official UK Charts Company. Archived from the original on 17 December 2007.
- Mendelsohn, Jason; Klinger, Eric (19 April 2013). "Counterbalance No. 125: The Rolling Stones' 'Aftermath'". PopMatters.
- Miles, Barry (1980). The Rolling Stones: An Illustrated Discography. London: Omnibus Press. ISBN 978-0-86001-762-2.
- Sheffield, Rob (2004). "The Rolling Stones". In Brackett, Nathan; Hoard, Christian (eds.). The New Rolling Stone Album Guide. London: Fireside. ISBN 0-7432-0169-8. Archived from the original on 12 April 2011 – via rollingstone.com.
- Monroe, Jazz (23 April 2015). "The Rolling Stones' Top 10 Albums – Ranked". NME. Archived from the original on 23 September 2016.
- Norman, Philip (2001). The Stones. London: Sidgwick & Jackson. ISBN 0-283-07277-6.
- Norman, Philip (2012). Mick Jagger. Doubleday Canada. ISBN 978-0-385-66906-1.
- Nyman, Jake (2005). Suomi soi 4: Suuri suomalainen listakirja (in Finnish) (1st ed.). Helsinki: Tammi. ISBN 951-31-2503-3.
- O'Rourke, Sally (14 June 2016). "It Was 50 Years Ago Today: 'Aftermath' by The Rolling Stones". REBEAT Magazine.
- Paglia, Camille (1994). Vamps & Tramps: New Essays. Vintage Books. ISBN 0-679-75120-3.
- Palmer, David (27 June 2011). "Playback: 'Aftermath' still has its shine". The Cullman Times.
- Perone, James E. (2012). The Album: A Guide to Pop Music's Most Provocative, Influential and Important Creations. Santa Barbara, CA: Praeger. ISBN 978-0-313-37906-2.
- Persad, Michelle (15 April 2013). "See The Rolling Stones Before They Released 'Aftermath' (PHOTO)". The Huffington Post. Archived from the original on 27 November 2018.
- Petridis, Alexis (17 May 2018). "The Rolling Stones – every album ranked!". The Guardian. Archived from the original on 17 October 2019.
- Philo, Simon (2015). British Invasion: The Crosscurrents of Musical Influence. Lanham, MD: Rowman & Littlefield. ISBN 978-0-8108-8627-8 – via Google Books.
- Rosen, Jody (2 July 2006). "The Rolling Stones Part 1: The 1960s and '70s". Blender. Archived from the original on 27 December 2010.
- Ross, Graeme (12 December 2018). "Playlist: The 10 best Rolling Stones albums". The Independent. Archived from the original on 16 December 2018.
- Salewicz, Chris (2002). Mick & Keith. London: Orion. ISBN 0-7528-1858-9.
- Savage, Jon (2015). 1966: The Year the Decade Exploded. London: Faber & Faber. ISBN 978-0-571-27763-6.
- Schaffner, Nicholas (1982). The British Invasion: From the First Wave to the New Wave. McGraw-Hill. ISBN 0-07-055089-1.
- Sheffield, Rob (17 August 2012). "Rolling Stones Album Guide: The Good, the Great and the 'Angie'". Rolling Stone. Archived from the original on 2 January 2020.
- Simonelli, David (2013). Working Class Heroes: Rock Music and British Society in the 1960s and 1970s. Lanham, MD: Lexington Books. ISBN 978-0-7391-7051-9 – via Google Books.
- Smith, Chris (2009). 101 Albums That Changed Popular Music. New York, NY: Oxford University Press. ISBN 978-0-19-537371-4.
- Smith, Emily Esfahani (Summer 2019). "The Provocations of Camille Paglia". City Journal.
- Smith, Patti (January 1973). "Jag-Arr of the Jungle". Creem – via oceanstar.com.
- Snow, Mat (2015). The Who: Fifty Years of My Generation. Race Point Publishing. ISBN 978-1-62788-782-3.
- Strong, Martin C. (2006). The Great Rock Discography. Edinburgh, UK: Canongate. ISBN 978-1-84195-615-2.
- Taylor, Jonathan (25 March 1987). "Pop Critics Pick Rock's Top 100". Los Angeles Daily News. Archived from the original on 11 November 2019 – via chicagotribune.com.
- Trynka, Paul (2015). Brian Jones: The Making of the Rolling Stones. New York, NY: Plume. ISBN 978-0-14-751645-9.
- Unterberger, Richie (n.d.). "The Rolling Stones 'What to Do'". AllMusic. Archived from the original on 28 November 2018.
- Unterberger, Richie (n.d.). "Aftermath – The Rolling Stones". AllMusic. Archived from the original on 1 December 2018.
- Walsh, Christopher (24 August 2002). "Super audio CDs: The Rolling Stones Remastered". Billboard.
- Wenner, Jann S. (14 December 1995). "The Rolling Stone Interview: Jagger Remembers". Rolling Stone. Archived from the original on 9 November 2010 – via jannswenner.com.
- Williams, Richard (10 October 2002). "The loudest thing we'd ever heard". The Guardian.
- Wyman, Bill (2002). Rolling with the Stones. London: Dorling Kindersley. ISBN 0-7513-4646-2.
- Young, Rob (December 2010). "The Rolling Stones Albums: Aftermath". Uncut Ultimate Music Guide: The Rolling Stones. No. 4.
