= Lady Jane (song) =

Single by the Rolling Stones

from the album Aftermath
- A-side: "Mother's Little Helper" (US)
- Released: 15 April 1966 (UK album); July 1966 (US single)
- Recorded: March 1966
- Studio: RCA, Hollywood, California
- Genre: Baroque pop; baroque rock; English folk
- Length: 3:06
- Label: Decca (UK); London (US)
- Songwriter: Jagger–Richards
- Producer: Andrew Loog Oldham

The Rolling Stones US singles chronology
"Paint It Black" (1966)	"Mother's Little Helper" / "Lady Jane" (1966)	"Have You Seen Your Mother, Baby, Standing in the Shadow?" (1966)

Aftermath track listing
- 14 tracks Side one: 1. "Mother's Little Helper"; 2. "Stupid Girl"; 3. "Lady Jane"; 4. "Under My Thumb"; 5. "Doncha Bother Me"; 6. "Goin' Home"; Side two: 7. "Flight 505"; 8. "High and Dry"; 9. "Out of Time"; 10. "It's Not Easy"; 11. "I Am Waiting"; 12. "Take It or Leave It"; 13. "Think"; 14. "What to Do"

"Lady Jane" is a song recorded by the English rock band the Rolling Stones. Written by the group's songwriting duo of Mick Jagger and Keith Richards, the song was initially included on the band's 1966 album Aftermath.

The song showcases Brian Jones' instrumental incorporation of baroque rock as it was beginning to be introduced. In the US and Germany, the song was released as the B-side of the "Mother's Little Helper" single on 2 July 1966, and peaked at number 24 on the Billboard Hot 100 chart.

== Background and composition ==
The song was written at a milestone in the Rolling Stones' recording career that saw Jagger and Richards emerge as the group's chief songwriters. On the band's previous album, Out of Our Heads, the duo shared writing credits on just three tracks. On Aftermath, however, the two were credited together on every track, making it the first album to be composed solely of original band material. It was also during this period that Brian Jones, despite losing control of the band's output, was integrating different instruments into the group's repertoire. Joe S. Harrington has noted that the Beatles' harpsichord-like sound on the song "In My Life", in 1965, opened considerations for Jones to include baroque rock instrumentals. The Rolling Stones had already used a harpsichord in the song "Play With Fire" from early 1965 as the B-side to "The Last Time". This was recorded months before the Beatles recorded "In My Life". Apparently, the Stones were already considering baroque rock instruments.

"Lady Jane" was written and composed by Jagger in early 1966 after reading the then controversial 1928 book Lady Chatterley's Lover, which uses the term "Lady Jane" to mean female genitalia. According to Jagger, "the names [in the song] are historical, but it was really unconscious that they should fit together from the same period." At the time, it was widely thought that an inspiration for the song was Jane Ormsby-Gore, daughter of David Ormsby-Gore, the former British ambassador in Washington, who later married Michael Rainey, founder of the Hung on You boutique in Chelsea that was frequented by the Stones. Its most influential development was by Jones, no longer the principal musical force for the band, searching for methods to improve upon their musical textures.

Jones expressed intrigue in incorporating culturally diverse instruments into the band's music, investigating the sitar, koto, marimba, and testing electronics. In the press Jones talked about applying the Appalachian dulcimer into compositions, although he seemed uncertain of the instrument, saying "It's an old English instrument used at the beginning of the century". According to Keith Richards, the dulcimer was brought to his attention when Jones began listening to recordings of folk musician Richard Fariña. Exactly when Jones discovered Fariña and his use of the dulcimer is open to speculation. The influence of these recordings would manifest itself in Aftermath, where Jones performed with the dulcimer on two tracks, "I Am Waiting" and, more distinctively, "Lady Jane". This later contributed to Jones's status as a pioneer in world music, and effectively shifted the band from blues rock to a versatile pop group.

== Recording ==
The master recording of "Lady Jane" was recorded from 6 to 9 March 1966, at RCA Studios in Los Angeles, with sound engineer Dave Hassinger guiding the band through the process (despite Andrew Loog Oldham being credited as producer). Mark Brend has indicated that the influence of Fariña's dulcimer playing can be clearly heard in Jones's recurring counter-melody to a call and response with Jagger's vocals. Jones plays the instrument in the traditional style, placed on his knees, fretted with a biter and plucked with a quill. In addition to the striking dulcimer motif, "Lady Jane" is also highlighted by Jack Nitzsche's harpsichord accompaniment halfway through the song.

"Lady Jane" also exhibits influences of author Geoffrey Chaucer, particularly in Jagger's vocal delivery and diction. To Richards, "Lady Jane is very Elizabethan. There are a few places in England where people still speak that way, Chaucer English [sic]". The vocal melody is set in the subtonic range, rather than the conventional major seventh scale degree, which presents a Renaissance-style modal. Although stylistically the two songs have little in common, the modality connects the Eastern melody and harmonies of "Lady Jane" to "Paint It Black".

== Release ==
In the US, and in Germany, "Lady Jane" was released as the B-side of "Mother's Little Helper". "Lady Jane" reached number 24 on Billboard's Hot 100 singles chart, while "Mother's Little Helper" reached number eight, making the release one of the few singles with both songs becoming hits in the US.

== Critical reception ==
Cash Box described the song as a "tender, inventively melodic pledge of devotion." San Francisco Examiner music critic Ralph Gleason called "Lady Jane" a "remarkable switch, a take-off on a 17th century formal dance...with imaginative musical effects."

== Personnel ==
According to authors Philippe Margotin and Jean-Michel Guesdon:

The Rolling Stones

- Mick Jagger – vocals
- Keith Richards – acoustic guitar
- Brian Jones – dulcimer
- Bill Wyman – bass guitar
- Charlie Watts – xylophone

Additional musicians

- Jack Nitzsche – harpsichord

== Charts ==
Chart (1966)	Peak position
Belgium (Ultratop 50 Flanders)	12
Belgium (Ultratop 50 Wallonia)	5
Canada Top Singles (RPM)	91
Italy (Musica e dischi)	20
New Zealand (Listener)	9
US Billboard Hot 100	24

== Covers ==
- David Garrick released a version in 1966, which reached No. 28 in the UK, and No. 6 in the Netherlands.
- Rotary Connection's 1968 album Rotary Connection includes a cover featuring Minnie Riperton's vocals.
- A cover by Norwegian band the Mojo Blues reached No. 7 in Norway during the summer of 1966.
- Tony Merrick released a version that charted at #49 in Britain in June 1966, according to The Guinness Book of British Hit Singles.
- Neil Young's 1975 album Tonight's the Night includes the song "Borrowed Tune", with new lyrics set to the melody of "Lady Jane". Both the title and lyrics ("I'm singing this borrowed tune / I took from the Rolling Stones") note the song's origin.
