= Fuzz bass =

Electric bass guitar tone modification

String instrument
- Classification: String instrument (fingered or picked or strummed)
- Developed: 1960s
- Timbre: fuzz, distortion

Related instruments
- Electric bass

Sound sample

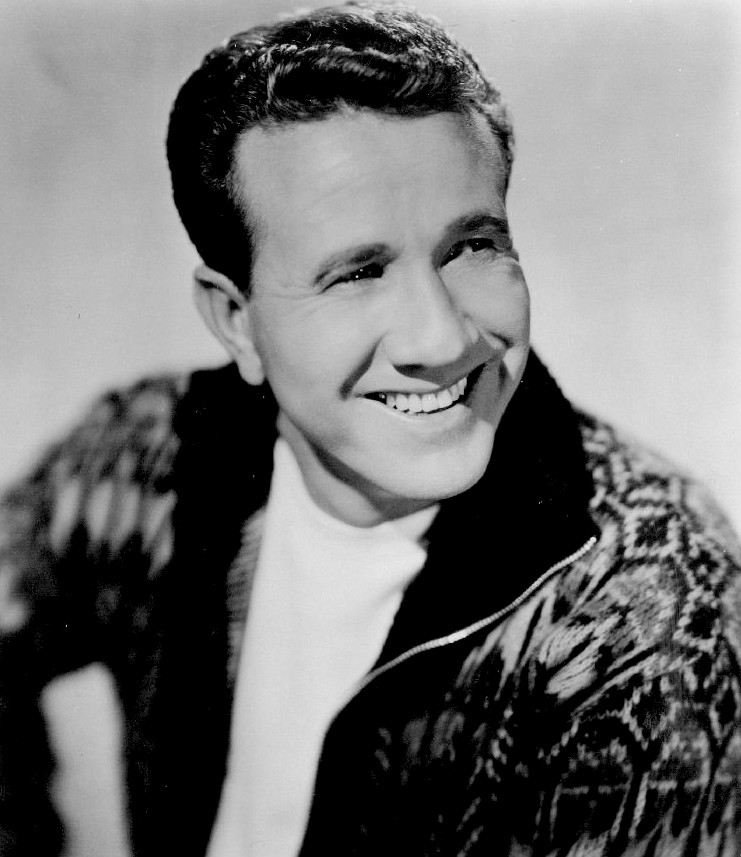
The first known musical recording to use the fuzz bass was Marty Robbins' 1961 song "Don't Worry".

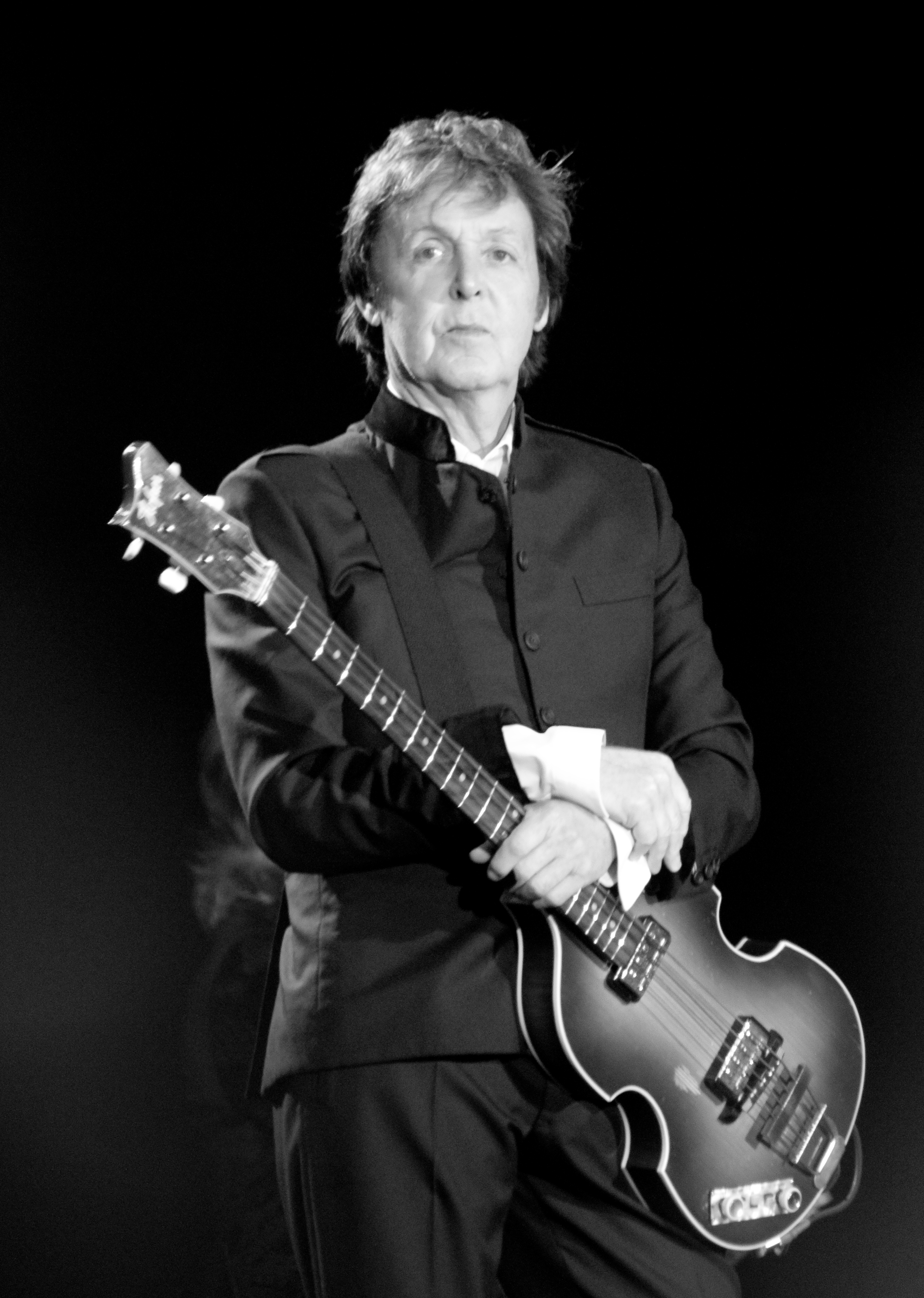
Paul McCartney, in one of the earliest uses of the fuzz bass, played the guitar on the 1965 Beatles song "Think for Yourself" from their album Rubber Soul.

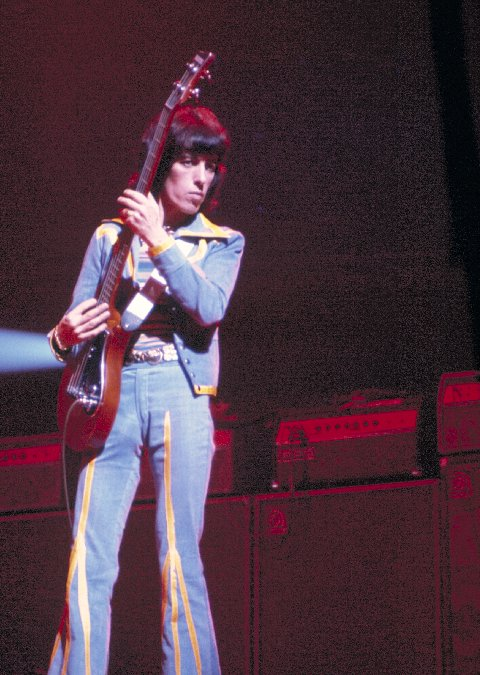
Bill Wyman in one of the earliest uses of this type of guitar played with a growling fuzz bass tone on the 1966 Rolling Stones songs "Under My Thumb", "Flight 505" and "Think" from their album Aftermath.

Fuzz bass is a style of playing the electric bass or modifying its signal that produces a buzzy, distorted, overdriven sound. Overdriving a bass signal significantly changes the timbre, adds higher overtones (harmonics), increases the sustain, and, if the gain is turned up high enough, creates a "breaking up" sound characterized by a growling, buzzy tone.

One of the earliest examples may be the 1961 Marty Robbins Country and Western song "Don't Worry". By the mid- to late-1960s, a number of bands began to list "fuzz bass" in addition to "electric bass" on their album credits. Two well-known examples are The Beatles' 1965 song "Think for Yourself" from their Rubber Soul album, which marked the first instance of a bass guitar being recorded through a distortion unit, and the 1966 Rolling Stones song "Under My Thumb". Album or performance credits for fuzz bass can be found from every decade since then (see examples below).

Fuzz bass can be produced by overloading a bass amp's tube or transistor preamplifier, by using a bass fuzz or bass overdrive effect pedal, or for the most powerful effect, by combining both approaches. In the 1960s and early 1970s fuzz bass was associated with the psychedelic music (e.g., Edgar Broughton Band), progressive rock (e.g., Genesis), and psychedelic soul/funk (e.g., Sly and the Family Stone) styles, and it tended to be a "warmer", "smoother", and "softer" overdrive-type sound caused by soft, symmetrical clipping of the audio signal that "round[ed] off the signal peaks rather than razor-slicing" them and filtered out the harsher high harmonics.

In the 1980s and 1990s, overdriven bass tended to be associated with hardcore punk (e.g., Stormtroopers of Death), death metal (e.g., Mortician), grindcore (e.g., Napalm Death) and Industrial bands (e.g., Ministry), and the tone tended to be heavier, more metallic and more grinding. This is achieved by hard clipping of the bass signal, which leaves in "harsher high harmonics that can result in sounds that are heard as jagged and spiky". Fuzz bass has been used by indie, alternative rock and hard rock bands such as Muse and Royal Blood.

== Approaches ==
In the context of electric guitars, the terms "distortion", "overdrive" and "fuzz" are often used interchangeably, but they have subtle differences in meaning.

- Overdrive effects are the mildest of the three, producing "warm" natural overtones at quieter volumes and harsher distortion as gain is increased. The best quality overdrive effects respond to how hard the bassist picks or plucks the bass, producing little or no distortion when the instrument is played quietly, but gradually adding overdrive as the instrument is played harder.
- A "distortion" effect produces approximately the same amount of distortion at any volume, and its sound alterations are much more pronounced and intense.
- A fuzzbox (or "fuzz box”) alters an audio signal until it is nearly a square wave and adds complex overtones by way of a frequency multiplier.

Waveform plot showing the different types of clipping. Tube overdrive is a form of soft limiting, while transistor clipping or extremely overdriven tube amps resemble hard clipping.

A fuzz bass sound can be created by turning up the volume of a tube amp or transistor amp to the point that preamplifier tube (or transistor preamp) clipping" occurs. In practice, when a bass amp is "cranked" to its maximum volume, the fuzz tone will also include some power amplifier clipping. While some musicians seek out the additional "grit" provided by power amp clipping, audio engineers and bass technicians recommend avoiding power amp clipping, as it can blow speakers.

Fuzz bass can be produced by using an electric guitar fuzz, distortion or overdrive pedal. The downside of using a pedal designed for the electric guitar is that the lower-end bass tone is mostly lost when the signal is heavily clipped.

Clipping is a form of waveform distortion that occurs when an amplifier is overdriven and attempts to deliver an output voltage or current beyond its maximum capability. Driving an amplifier into clipping may cause it to output power in excess of its published ratings. Clipping is a non-linear process that produces frequencies not originally present in the audio signal.

These frequencies can either be "harmonic", meaning they are whole number multiples of the signal's original frequencies, or "inharmonic", meaning dissonant odd-order overtones. Harmonic distortion produces harmonically related overtones while intermodulation distortion produces inharmonic overtones. "Soft clipping" gradually flattens the peaks of a signal and de-emphasizes higher odd harmonics. "Hard clipping" flattens peaks abruptly, resulting in harsh-sounding, high amplitude odd harmonics.

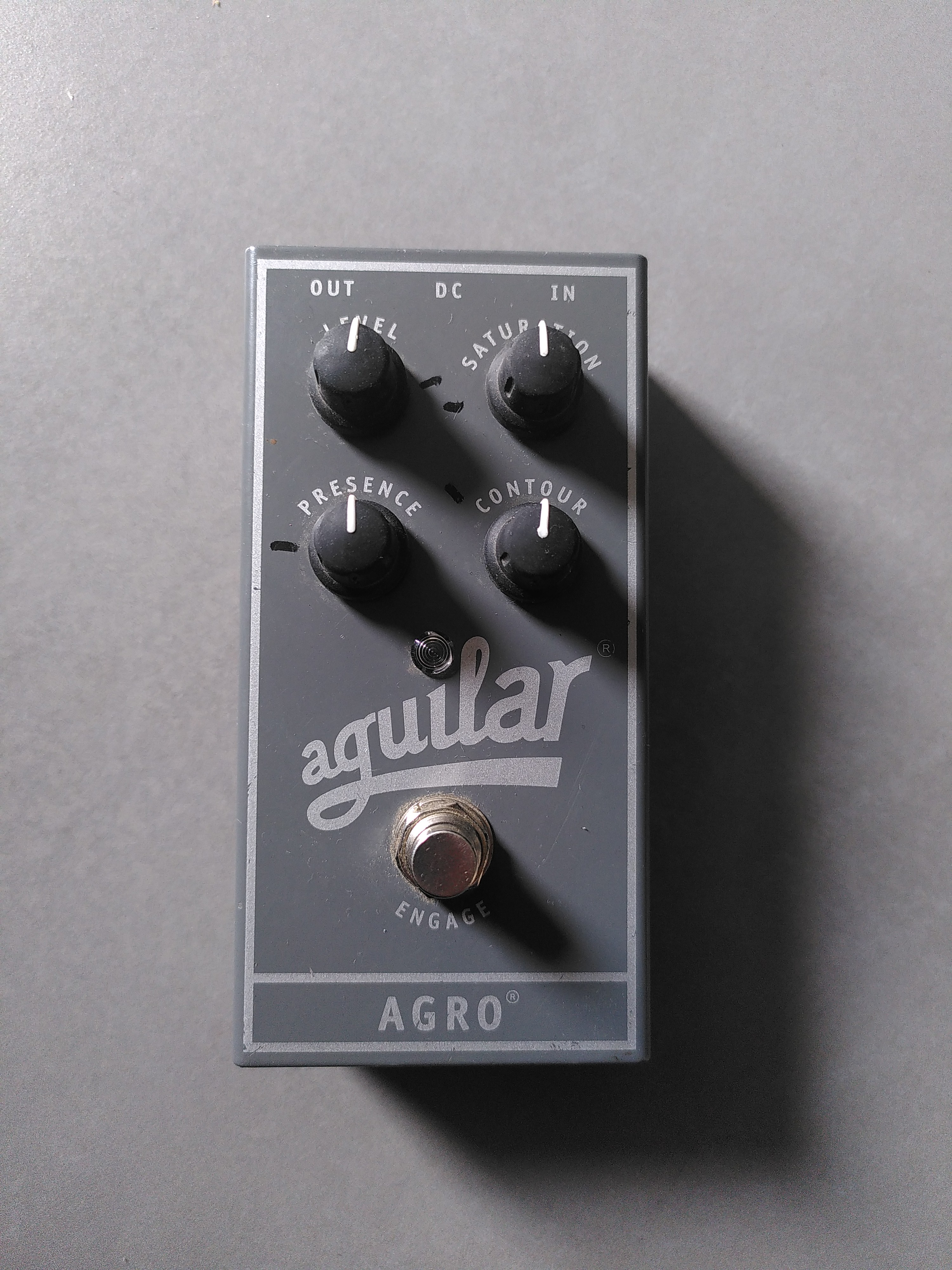
Aguilar Agro bass overdrive pedal, manufactured in the 2010s

Since the late 1980s, manufacturers have been producing bass overdrive pedals specifically designed for the electric bass, and in many cases they found a way to keep the low fundamental pitch in along with the buzzy overdrive tone. One early model was the Ibanez "Bass Stack" bass overdrive pedal, which was sold in the late 1980s.

External videos
- Napalm Death live in Germany, 1987, the second song is half-way through the clip at 4 minutes, 37 seconds has a buzz-saw type heavy bass distortion, from YouTube, authorized by Earache Records.

1980s grindcore groups, such as Napalm Death in the sound clip to the right, used a very heavy, distorted bass tone that resembles the sound of a grinding buzz saw.

Darkglass bass overdrive pedal on a 6-string bass

The simplest fuzz bass pedals have knobs for controlling the volume level, the tone, and the fuzz or overdrive effect. More complex pedals have different distortion effects (e.g., overdrive and fuzz), gates to trigger the volume at which sounds will get overdriven, mixers to mix the natural and fuzzed sound in the player's desired proportions, and multiple band equalizers (typically for low and high frequencies). Boutique fuzz bass pedals even have unusual effects such as a "starve" effect, which mimics the distortion sound a pedal gives with a dying battery, a diode selector (either silicon or germanium) for selecting the transistor overdrive tone, and an octave selector (above or below the pitch being played).

== Overdrive built into amplifiers ==
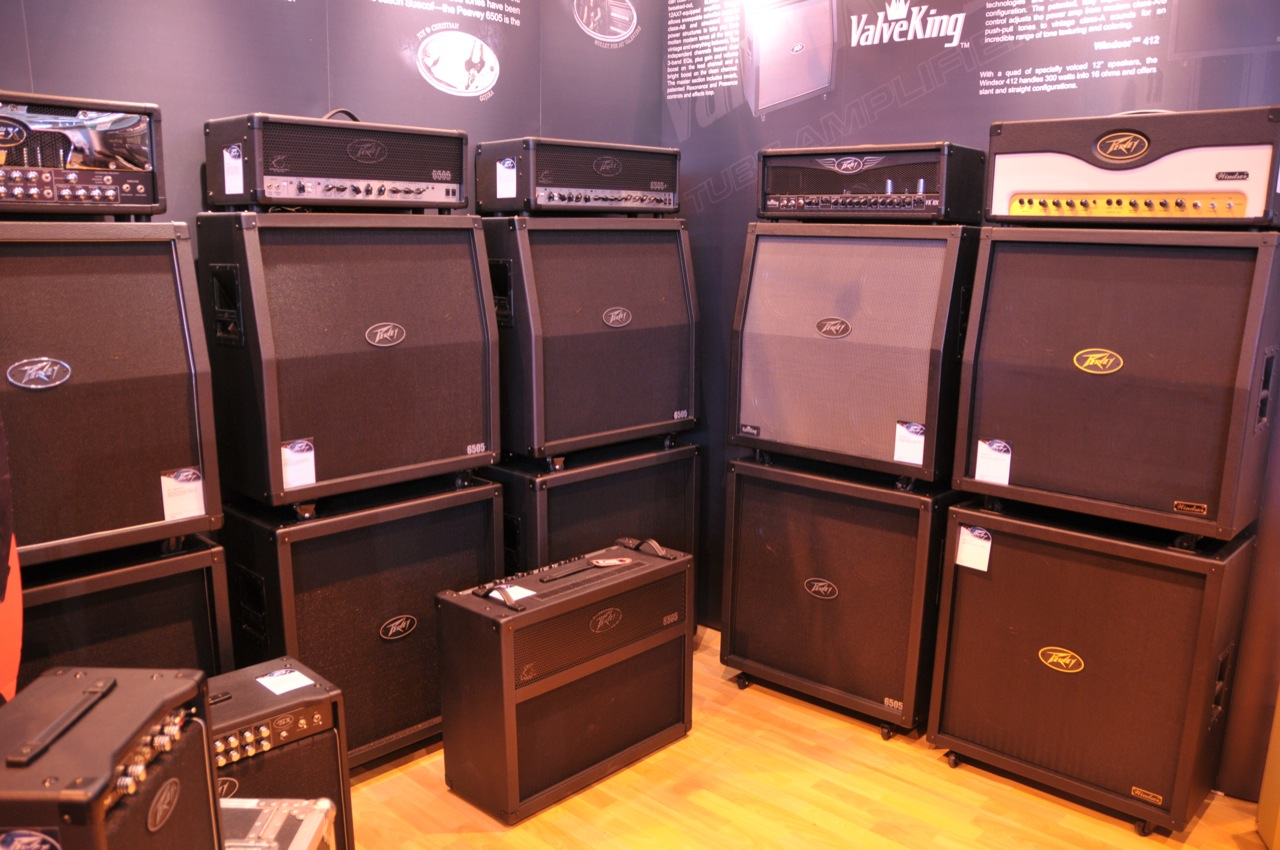
Over the years, various Peavey bass amplifiers have had built-in distortion effects.

Some bass amplifiers have an "overdrive" or distortion effect built into the unit. The Peavey Century 200 has an onboard "distortion" effect on the second channel. The Peavey VB-2 also has built-in overdrive. Aguilar Amplification's AG 500 bass head is a two-channel amplifier, one of which offers a "saturation" control for overdrive. A variety of BOSS combo amplifiers have a built-in "drive" effect. Gallien-Krueger's bass amp heads have a "boost" control that provides a simulated tube overdrive effect. The Behringer Ultrabass BVT5500H Bass Amplifier Head has a built-in limiter and overdrive. The LowDown LD 150 bass amp has a range of overdrive sounds, from a slight hint to heavy distortion. The CUBE-20XL BASS amp includes built-in overdrive.

The 75 W Fender Rumble 75 Bass Combo Amp can produce an overdrive effect by using the gain and blend controls, giving overdrive sounds ranging from "mellow warmth [to] heavy distorted tones". The Fender SuperBassman is a 300-watt tube head that has a built-in overdrive channel. The Fender Bronco 40 includes a range of effects including modern bass overdrive, vintage overdrive and fuzz.

Lemmy Kilmister, the bassist for Motorhead, obtained a natural fuzz bass tone by overdriving his twin 100-watt Marshall Bass stacks.

The MESA Bigblock 750 has a built-in overdrive channel. The Mesa M2000 has a high gain switch that can be engaged with a footswitch. The Marshall MB450 head and combo bass amplifiers have a tube pre-amp on the "Classic" channel that can be overdriven. The Ashdown ABM 500 EVO III 575W Bass amp head has a built-in overdrive effect. Overdrive is also available on many Crate bass amplifiers. The Yamaha BBT500H has three types of built-in drive effects: overdrive, distortion and fuzz. The Ampeg B5R Bass Amplifier has two channels: clean and overdrive, with the ability to combine the two. The Orange has introduced a new line of bass amplifiers (OB 1 series) with a built in fuzz.
