= Chris Salewicz =

British journalist

Chris Salewicz (/ˈsæləvɪtʃ/ SAL-ə-vitch) is a journalist, broadcaster and novelist who lives in London.

== Career ==
Salewicz was as a senior features writer for the New Musical Express (NME) from 1975 to 1981, where, under tutelage of editor Neil Spencer, he and other journalists were said to have "re-written the book on music journalism". The period Salewicz spent at NME is regarded by some as a 'Golden Age of Music Journalism', where, fuelled by the punk rock explosion, the whole genre changed into a complex revolutionary socioeconomic critique rather than the fan club–style journalism of the previous decades. Along with other NME alumni (notably Tony Parsons and Julie Burchill) of that period, Salewicz's work was soon featured in mainstream publications such as the Sunday Times, The Independent, The Daily Telegraph, Conde Nast Traveller, Q, Mojo and Time Out; he also wrote for The Face magazine.

Salewicz's time at the NME allowed him to form close friendships with Joe Strummer of the Clash and Bob Marley. His journalism covered some of the experiences he had with them, including the Trenchtown Ghetto, Jamaican Gun Court, and Zimbabwean independence, and Maida Vale Squat, Groucho Club, and a search for Garcia Lorca's bones in Andalucía. Salewicz's writing and subsequent books on Strummer (Redemption Song) and Marley (The Untold Story) expanded beyond their musical impact into what made them political and cultural icons. In 1995, he and film director Don Letts moved to Jamaica for two years to develop film ideas. Drawing on extensive research, Salewicz wrote Third World Cop, which became Jamaica's highest-grossing film ever when it was released in 1999.

Salewicz is the author of fifteen books, including Rude Boy: Once Upon a Time in Jamaica; Redemption Song: the Definitive Biography of Joe Strummer; and Bob Marley: The Untold Story. He was the on-screen narrator in 2010's Beats of Freedom, a documentary feature film, released cinematically in Poland, about how Polish rock and roll helped bring down communism. The same year, Salewicz went into Tivoli Gardens in Kingston to report on the "Dudus affair" for The Wall Street Journal.

== Bibliography ==
- Bob Marley: The Untold Story (2010)
- Redemption Song: The Definitive Biography of Joe Strummer (2012)
- Reggae Explosion (2013) - with Adrian Boot
- Dead Gods: The 27 Club (2015)
- Jimmy Page: The Definitive Biography (2018)
