= Mother's Little Helper =

1966 song by the Rolling Stones

- US picture sleeve

Single by the Rolling Stones
- B-side: "Lady Jane"
- Released: July 1966
- Recorded: December 1965
- Studio: RCA, Hollywood
- Genre: Folk rock; pop; rock; raga rock; English folk
- Length: 2:45
- Label: Decca (UK); London (US)
- Songwriter: Jagger–Richard
- Producer: Andrew Loog Oldham

The Rolling Stones US singles chronology
"Paint It Black" (1966)	"Mother's Little Helper" (1966)	"Have You Seen Your Mother, Baby, Standing in the Shadow?" (1966)

Official lyric video
- "Mother's Little Helper" on YouTube

"Mother's Little Helper" is a song by the English rock band the Rolling Stones. A product of Mick Jagger and Keith Richards' songwriting partnership, it is a folk rock song with Eastern influences. Its lyrics deal with the popularity of prescribed tranquilisers like Valium among housewives and the potential hazards of overdose or addiction. Recorded in December 1965, it was first released in the United Kingdom as the opening track of the band's April 1966 album, Aftermath. In the United States, it was omitted from the album and instead issued as a single in July 1966 during the band's fifth American tour. The Rolling Stones' twelfth US single, "Mother's Little Helper" spent nine weeks on the US Billboard Hot 100, peaking at No. 8, and it reached No. 4 on both Record World and Cash Box's charts.

Though American fans generally found "Mother's Little Helper" lacking when compared to the band's previous singles, contemporary reviewers described the song in favourable terms. The first pop song to address middle-class drug dependency, it helped to establish the band's reputation for cultural subversion. Retrospective commentators have described it as an early example of the Rolling Stones' developing sound and suggestive of Jagger's later songwriting. They have often compared the song's sound and lyrics to the contemporary work of Ray Davies, especially the Kinks' 1965 song "A Well Respected Man", and have typically interpreted its lyrics as either admonishing the older generation for their hypocrisy in critiquing recreational drug use, or as a social commentary on housewives who found their lives unfulfilling.

== Background and composition ==
=== Music ===
"Mother's Little Helper", December 1965
Musicologist Walter Everett describes the flattened major second chord heard at "calm her down" as "ostentatious". Later reinterpreted as a flattened major seventh, the chord gives the song a modal and thereby Indian feel.

Keith Richards composed the music to "Mother's Little Helper" in September or October 1965, before the Rolling Stones left the UK for their fourth North American tour. The song is a folk rock composition based around an Eastern-flavoured guitar riff. Written in the Aeolian mode, it is an early instance of modal experimentation in rock music, helping provide the song with an Indian feel. One of the few Rolling Stones songs written in a minor key, its underlying tonality is that of E minor, but ends on an unexpected G major chord, which Richards later suggested may have been contributed by bassist Bill Wyman. Journalist Stephen Davis writes the song uses the same "frantic rockabilly rhythm" heard on "19th Nervous Breakdown" – both songs subdivide their beats into triplets – before shifting to a country and western styled bridge.

=== Lyrics ===
In early December 1965, the Rolling Stones began recording songs for their next LP, released the following year as Aftermath. (Note: Sources disagree on the exact recording dates. Margotin & Guesdon and Babiuk & Prevost write the first set of Aftermath sessions were 8–10 December 1965, David Dalton and Massimo Bonanno write it was 6–10 and Felix Aeppli says it was 3–8. Alan Clayson simply writes it was early December 1965.) Dave Hassinger, the main recording engineer for the album, later recalled asking his wife to bring some depressants to the studio, and she brought several small pills, likely Valiums. Inspired by the event, Mick Jagger immediately composed the song's lyrics, and the song is credited to the Jagger–Richard songwriting partnership. (Note: On Oldham's suggestion, Richards' name was spelled without the s for most of the 1960s and 70s. On both the UK edition of Aftermath and the US single, the song is therefore credited to "Jagger, Richard".)

Variously described as a satire or a parody, the lyrics focus on a middle-aged woman with children who has become dependent upon pills. So dependent on Valium to alleviate her feelings of existential pain, she asks her doctor to write extra prescriptions. (Note: In the early 1960s, the pharmaceutical company Hoffman-La Roche introduced several anti-anxiety drugs, known as benzodiazepines. Librium was the most popular tranquiliser in the US until Valium was introduced in 1963. Both more effective and less bitter-tasting than Librium, Valium was prescribed four million times in America in 1964, typically to women and the elderly to diminish their feelings of everyday stress.) The mother's state of anxiety is reinforced by the song's recurrent lyric of "What a drag it is getting old", sung by Jagger from her point of view, with the bridge consisting of pleas from the mother for more pills before the final verse warns her of the threat of an overdose posed by the drugs.

== Recording ==
That's a twelve-string [guitar] with a slide on it. It's played slightly Oriental-ish. The track just needed something to make it twang. Otherwise, the song was quite vaudeville in a way. I wanted to add some nice bite to it.

— Keith Richards on "Mother's Little Helper", 2002

The Rolling Stones recorded "Mother's Little Helper" in early December 1965 at RCA studios in Hollywood, California. Andrew Loog Oldham produced the sessions. Like contemporary Indian-influenced rock songs, such as the Yardbirds' "Heart Full of Soul" (June 1965) and the Kinks' "See My Friends" (July 1965), "Mother's Little Helper" uses an electric guitar to mimic the sound of a sitar; Brian Jones and Richards each play a dual-slide riff on an electric twelve-string guitar. (Note: Sources disagree on how the song's distinct sound was achieved. In his book The Rolling Stones Complete Recording Sessions, Martin Elliott writes that Jones played a sitar on the track, while Malvinni instead writes a guitar stood-in for the sitar. Jagger recalled the guitar being an electric twelve-string, and Richards further recalled playing the electric twelve-string with a slide. Babiuk & Prevost and Margotin & Guesdon state Richards and Jones both played guitar, each using a slide on an electric twelve-string. After acknowledging the other's views, author Gary J. Jucha suggests Jones was the only one playing electric twelve-string, using his Vox Mando-Guitar, and embellished its sound by overdubbing a tambura.) Author Andrew Grant Jackson suggests the riff was Richards' attempt to imitate the sitar heard on the Beatles' song "Norwegian Wood (This Bird Has Flown)", which had been released on the album Rubber Soul the week before the Rolling Stones began recording. Jones doubles Richards with a Rickenbacker 12-string, tuned down an octave, while Richards played a beaten-up twelve-string which he had repaired:

[I]t was just one of those things where someone walked in and said, 'Look, it's an electric twelve-string.' It was some gashed-up job. No name on it. God knows where it came from. Or where it went. But I put it together with a bottleneck.

Richards further contributed rhythm guitar with his Gibson Hummingbird acoustic guitar. During the song's intro, at 0:30, an electric guitar chord is emphasised leading into the riff, accomplished with either a volume pedal or by violining. Wyman's bass guitar contribution includes distortion made with a Maestro FZ-1 Fuzz-Tone, and authors Philippe Margotin & Jean-Michel Guesdon describe his playing as reminiscent of the Memphis sound-style. (Note: Margotin and Guesdon write Wyman is on bass guitar and that the distortion beginning at 1:22 is caused by either a Fuzz-Tone on the bass or another electric guitar. Walter Everett writes the recording uses fuzz tone.) Jagger's lead vocal is double-tracked while Richards contributes a vocal harmony. Jagger's vocal style for the song irritated his bandmates, later described by Oldham as sounding "near-cockney". Jagger later described the complete song as "a very strange disc", with a music hall sound made more distinct by the electric twelve-string guitar.

== Release and reception ==
=== UK release ===
Decca Records released Aftermath in the UK on 15 April 1966, sequencing "Mother's Little Helper" as the opening track. The first pop song to address middle-class drug dependency, it was one of several tracks on Aftermath which contributed to listeners interpreting Jagger and Richards as anti-feminists, while also helping to establish the band's reputation for cultural subversion. Due to its explicit drug references, the BBC banned the song from radio play. To help promote Aftermath, the band appeared on the British television programme Top of the Pops the day before its release, miming a performance of "Mother's Little Helper". The band were typically unsatisfied with attempts to perform the song live; drummer Charlie Watts later recalled it was too difficult to play: "[I]t's never been any good, never gelled for some reason – it's either me not playing it right or Keith [Richards] not wanting to do it like that".

Among British critics, Richard Green wrote in his review of Aftermath for the British weekly Record Mirror that "Mother's Little Helper" "[c]ould almost be a Beatle-written song", with both a "driving force and sudden breaks". He concluded that the song was "a fantastic track", particularly its guitar phrases, vocal harmonies and the "peculiar guitar sound". Keith Altham of the New Musical Express (NME) opined that the song was one of three on the LP that could have been released as a single, highlighting its bass, lyric and rhythm.

=== US release ===
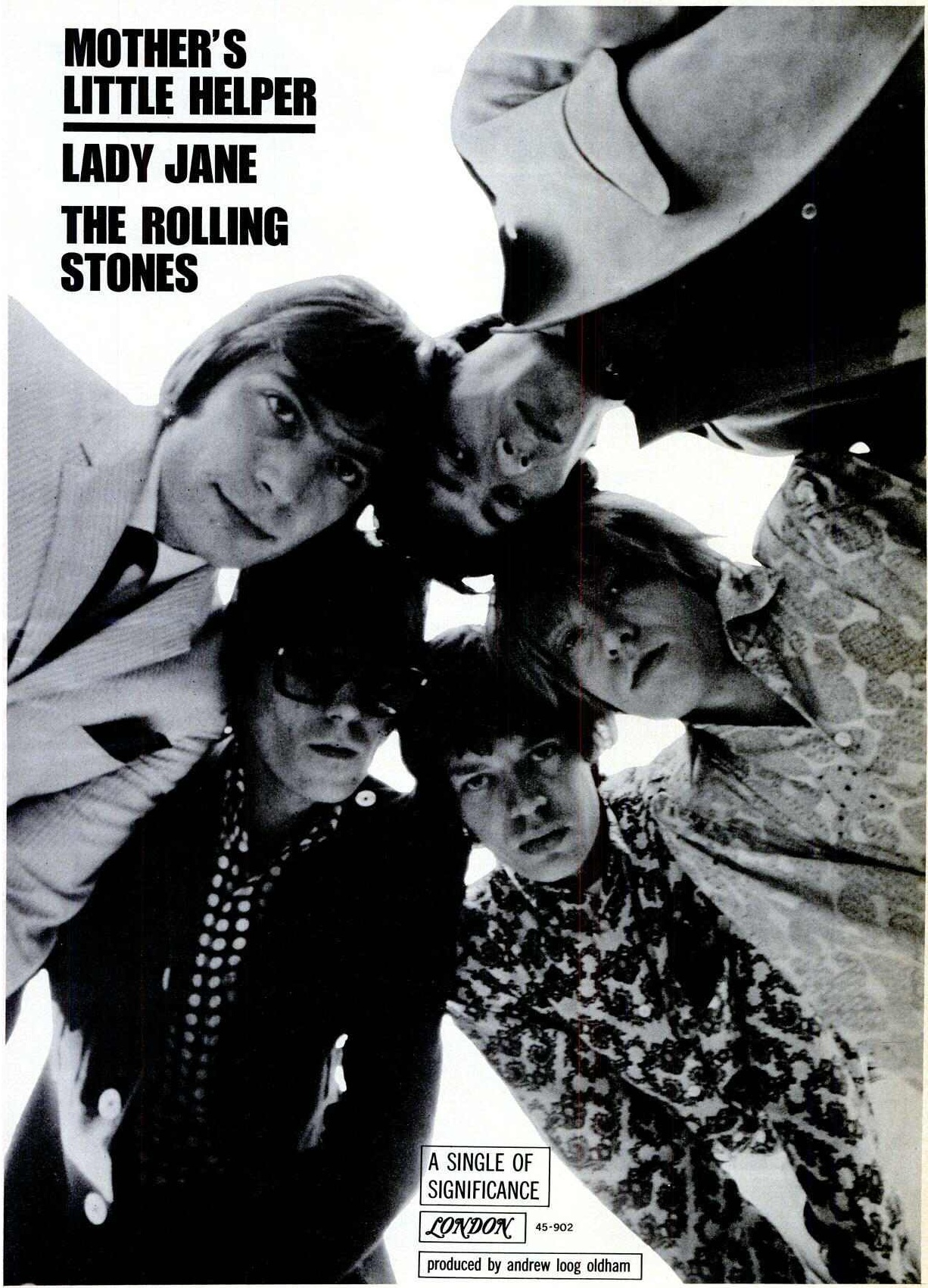
London Records' trade ad for the "Mother's Little Helper" single.

London Records omitted "Mother's Little Helper" from the US edition of Aftermath, replacing it with "Paint It Black", and instead released it as a single. In order to coincide with the band's fifth American tour, the label delayed the release of the album until 20 June. (Note: Sources disagree on the single's release date, with some writing it was in June 1966 and others specifying 2 July 1966. Among the authors dating it to June are Barry Miles, David Dalton, Barbara Charone, Felix Aeppli and Massimo Bonanno. Those who write it was 2 July include Wyman & Ray Coleman, Steve Appleford, Andy Babiuk & Greg Prevost and Margotin & Guesdon. Margotin & Guesdon acknowledge similar confusion regarding the US release date of Aftermath, while simply dating the single to 2 July 1966. "Mother's Little Helper" entered Billboard, Cash Box and Record World's charts on 9 July 1966.) The band's twelfth US single, it featured "Lady Jane" as its B-side. Its picture sleeve used the same image and graphics as the US edition of Aftermath, as photographed by David Bailey. On 23 June 1966, after arriving in New York City to begin their tour, the band promoted the releases by holding a press conference and party aboard the yacht of their manager, Allen Klein. Published in the 9 July 1966 issue of Billboard magazine, a trade advertisement promoting the single promised it was one of significance. At the time of its release, listeners had begun buying albums almost as much as a singles; Wyman later reflected that the album garnered more discussion from American observers than the single, while Stephen Davis writes that fans found the song lacking when compared to the band's previous singles.

The day of the US single's release, the review panels of both Record World and Cash Box magazine selected "Mother's Little Helper" as a "Pick of the Week". Cash Box's reviewer wrote that, with "Paint It Black" still in the top ten of the magazine's singles chart, they expected "Mother's Little Helper" to do similarly well. The reviewer characterised the song as an "attack on some of contemporary society's 'manufactured' solutions to real problems", and Record World's reviewer similarly designated it a "cynical rock entry" about "taking the easy way in modern living". Billboard's review panel described the song as similar in sound to "Paint It Black" and predicted it would reach at least the top 20 of the Billboard Hot 100 chart.

The 9 July issue of Billboard classified "Mother's Little Helper" as a "breakout single" across the US, entering the Hot 100 that day at No. 70. It remained on the chart for nine weeks, peaking at No. 8. (Note: The single's B-side, "Lady Jane", reached No. 24 on the same chart.) The song also reached No. 4 on both Cash Box and Record World's charts, and was ranked No. 93 on Cash Box's year-end rankings for 1966.

"Mother's Little Helper" was later included on the US release Flowers, a 1967 compilation album which collected songs that had generally not yet been included on a US LP. Other compilations it has since appeared on include Through the Past, Darkly (Big Hits Vol. 2) (1969), Hot Rocks 1964–1971 (1971), Singles Collection: The London Years (1989) and Forty Licks (2002).

== Retrospective assessment ==
Stephen Davis writes "Mother's Little Helper" and the Rolling Stones' other 1966 singles were "anarchic pop art masterpieces", and musician and author Bill Janovitz writes they were all early examples of the band introducing "radically new sounds" while making "significant statements". Sally O'Rourke of Rebeat magazine writes the song's "vaguely Eastern riff" indicated the developing influence of both Indian music and psychedelic rock on the Rolling Stones, anticipating the more developed sound heard on "Paint It Black". Author Chris Salewicz sets it in the context of a mid-1960s trend of the younger generation disparaging the older, while David Marchese of Vulture writes it was part of Jagger's "great lyrical leap", employing the satire and irony which would characterise much of his later songwriting. Critic Rob Sheffield writes in The New Rolling Stone Album Guide that the US edition of Aftermath was improved by replacing the song with "Paint It Black", while Salewicz instead considers the US edition inferior due to the change.

Author Philip Norman and Eric Klinger of PopMatters each describe the songwriting of "Mother's Little Helper" as reminiscent of the work of Ray Davies, as do Margotin & Guesdon, who compare it to the Kinks' 1965 song "A Well Respected Man". Richie Unterberger of AllMusic focuses on the guitar sound, writing its "folk-rock-like strum" is similar to both "A Well Respected Man" and another of the Kinks' mid-1960s singles, "Dedicated Follower of Fashion". Author Gary J. Jucha describes it as a "dressed up folk song", written in the style of Bob Dylan, while author Paul Trynka instead denigrates it as a "messy Kinks rip-off". Musicologist Allan F. Moore considers the song's "daring subject matter" as contributing to the Rolling Stones' image as the darker opposite of the Beatles, while author Steve Turner suggests it was a possible inspiration for John Lennon in writing the similarly themed Beatles composition, "Doctor Robert", recording for which began only two days after the British release of Aftermath.

=== Interpretation of lyrics ===
Critic Jim DeRogatis counts "Mother's Little Helper" among several of the Rolling Stones' mid-1960s singles whose titles or themes drew from the band's experiences with drugs, including "19th Nervous Breakdown", "Paint It Black" and the 1966 compilation album Big Hits (High Tide and Green Grass). He writes that the song "pokes fun at suburban moms on speed", while Stephen Davis goes further, describing its lyrics as a "blatant attack on motherhood", directly addressing "tranquilised suburban housewives". Authors Nicholas Schaffner and Sean Egan each see the song as critiquing the hypocrisy of suburban housewives who rant about teenage drug abuse while requiring drugs of their own to get through the day.

Just what was this problem that has no name? What were the words women used when they tried to express it? Sometimes a woman would say "I feel empty somehow ... incomplete." Or she would say, "I feel as if I don't exist." Sometimes she blotted out the feeling with a tranquilizer.

— Betty Friedan, The Feminine Mystique (1963)

Where author James Hector finds the lyrics typical for Jagger in being both "miserable" and misogynistic, Philippe Margotin and Jean-Michel Guesdon instead count the song as an exception to the misogynistic lyrics heard throughout Aftermath. They suggest the song expresses compassion for a housewife who has become reliant on pharmaceutical drugs to cope with her daily life, while also more broadly connecting modern society to feelings of unhappiness. Andrew Grant Jackson sees it as a warning to stressed housewives, writing it is one of the few times in the Stones' discography where they advocate against drug use, something Unterberger similarly describes as more moralistic than was typical for the band's music.

Author David Malvinni connects the song to the writings of feminist Betty Friedan, specifically her second-wave feminist book The Feminine Mystique (1963). Friedan discusses the "trapped housewife" phenomenon, made up of mothers who felt unfulfilled with their daily lives and the societal expectation that they remain at home. Feeling unhappy, but unsure why, mothers sometimes turned to prescribed tranquilizers "because it makes you not care so much that it's pointless." Malvinni writes that in the song's lyrics, "it is as though Jagger read Friedan, as he channeled her basic ideas."

== Other versions ==
"Mother's Little Helper" has been covered by numerous artists. Before its release on Aftermath, it was among the pop songs orchestrated for and recorded by the Aranbee Pop Symphony Orchestra, included on their February 1966 album, Today's Pop Symphony. Released on Oldham's independent Immediate label, the record was produced by Richards, who selected the songs included on the album. As had occurred with the Beatles' Rubber Soul, numerous tracks on Aftermath were covered soon after its release, including an April 1966 version of "Mother's Little Helper" by Welsh singer Gene Latter. NME's reviewer wrote he loved Latter's "fruity, rather coarse voice" and the fuzz guitar offsetting it. American singer-songwriter Liz Phair recorded the song for the television series Desperate Housewives, later included on the show's associated soundtrack album, Music from and Inspired by Desperate Housewives (2005). In his review of the album for AllMusic, Stephen Thomas Erlewine describes the cover as "flat-footed" and one of the album's weak points.

== Personnel ==
According to Philippe Margotin and Jean-Michel Guesdon:

The Rolling Stones

- Mick Jagger – doubled-tracked lead vocals
- Keith Richards – backing vocals, twelve-string electric slide guitar, acoustic guitar
- Brian Jones – twelve-string electric slide guitar
- Bill Wyman – bass, fuzz bass
- Charlie Watts – drums

Production

- Andrew Loog Oldham – producer
- David Hassinger – sound engineer

== Charts ==
Weekly chart performance
Chart (1966)	Peak position
Belgium (Ultratop 40 Wallonia)	5
Canada Top Singles (RPM)	14
Finland (Suomen Virallinen)	24
Netherlands (Dutch Top 40)	7
Netherlands (Single Top 100)	5
New Zealand (Listener)	6
Sweden (Kvällstoppen)	13
Sweden (Tio i Topp)	5
US Billboard Hot 100	8
US Cash Box Top 100 Singles	4
US Record World 100 Top Pops	4
West Germany (Musikmarkt)	9

Year-end chart performance
Chart (1966)	Ranking
Netherlands (Dutch Top 40)	77
US Cash Box	93

== See also ==
- Culture of Domesticity
