= Think (Rolling Stones song) =

1966 song by the Rolling Stones

Single by Chris Farlowe
- B-side: "Don't Just Look at Me" (Andrew Loog Oldham/Russell)
- Released: 14 January 1966
- Recorded: December 1965, London
- Label: Immediate IM023
- Songwriters: Mick Jagger and Keith Richards
- Producers: Andrew Loog Oldham, Mick Jagger and Keith Richards

Chris Farlowe singles chronology
"The Fool" (1965)	"Think" (1966)	"Out of Time" (1966)

Official audio
- "Think" on YouTube

"Think" is a Mick Jagger and Keith Richards composition. It first appeared as a Chris Farlowe single which reached No 37 on the UK Singles Chart in January 1966. The Rolling Stones' own version appeared, three months later, on their Aftermath album, with a rewritten third verse.

== Personnel ==
According to authors Philippe Margotin and Jean-Michel Guesdon, except where noted:

- Mick Jagger – vocals
- Keith Richards – fuzz guitar, acoustic guitar, backing vocals
- Brian Jones – rhythm guitar
- Bill Wyman – bass
- Charlie Watts – drums
