= Weston High School (Connecticut) =

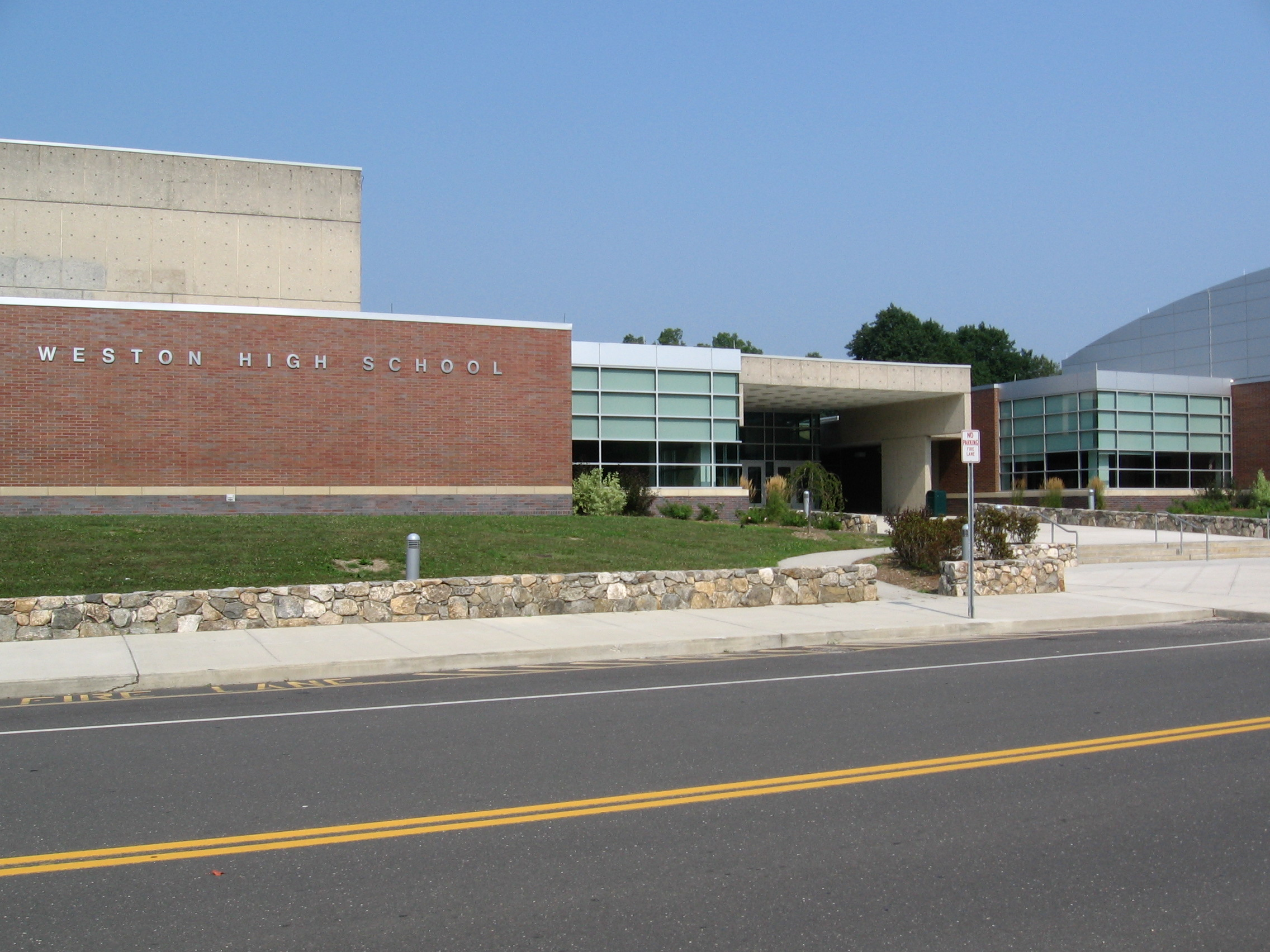
- Weston High School entrance

Location
- 115 School Road; Weston, Connecticut 06883; United States; 41°12′41″N 73°22′45″W

Information
- Type: Public high school
- CEEB code: 070913
- Principal: Meghan Conetta
- Grades: 9 to 12
- Gender: Coeducation
- Enrollment: 709 (2023–2024)
- Campus type: Suburban
- Colors: Blue and Gold
- Mascot: Trojan
- Website: whs.westonps.org

Weston High School is a public high school in Weston, Connecticut, United States, serving about 800 students in grades 9–12.

The Class of 2008 had the highest CAPT scores in the state in 2006. In 2013, Weston High School was put on the National Blue Ribbon Schools Program list. For the purpose of comparison with the achievement levels of similar schools, the state Connecticut State Department of Education classifies schools and communities in "District Reference Groups", defined as "districts whose students' families are similar in education, income, occupation and need, and that have roughly similar enrollment".

Weston is one of eight school districts in District Reference Group A (along with Darien, Easton, New Canaan, Redding, Ridgefield, Westport, and Wilton).

The school is fully accredited by the New England Association of Schools and Colleges.

== Notable alumni ==
- Jared Cohen, nonfiction author, Rhodes scholar, and the youngest member of the Secretary of State's Policy Planning Staff
- Kyle Dunnigan, comedian
- Hans Niemann, teenage chess grandmaster
- Jane Paknia, musician
- Jacob Pitts, actor; Eurotrip, Across the Universe, and 21
- Jamey Richard, NFL player drafted by the Indianapolis Colts in the 7th round with the 236th pick in the 2008 NFL draft
- Alexandra Richards, international model, daughter of Rolling Stone Keith Richards, graduated in 2004
- Theodora Richards, international model, daughter of Rolling Stone Keith Richards, graduated in 2003
- Jonathan W. Stokes, screenwriter; has written for actors such as Jeremy Renner, Will Smith, and Hugh Jackman
- Erik Weihenmayer, athlete, adventurer, author, activist and motivational speaker; first blind person to reach the summit of Mount Everest, on May 25, 2001
