= Gus & Me =

Children's book by Keith Richards

Gus & Me is a 2014 children's book written by Rolling Stones guitarist Keith Richards. The book is subtitled "The Story of My Granddad and My First Guitar", and recounts the story of how a young Richards learned to play guitar from his grandfather, Theodore Augustus "Gus" Dupree. The book was illustrated by Richards' daughter, Theodora Richards, who was named after her great-grandfather. Gus & Me reached #2 on The New York Times Best Seller list for children's books. It was written with Barnaby Harris and Bill Shapiro, and was published in 2014 by Little, Brown Books for Young Readers. It was packaged with a CD that featured Richards reading the story. In 2010, Little, Brown published Richards' bestselling biography, LIFE.
