= Bill Shapiro =

American writer and editor

Bill Shapiro is an American writer and editor. He is best known for serving as the editor of LIFE magazine, and as the founding editor of LIFE.com.

LIFE magazine had not been published as a weekly for 32 years until Shapiro revived it in 2004. It resumed publication as a weekend supplement to U.S. newspapers. This was the biggest launch in Time Inc. history, with a combined circulation of approximately 12 million.

LIFE.com was launched on March 31, 2009, in partnership with Getty Images. It won the National Magazine Award for digital photography in 2011, and Webby Awards in 2010 and 2011.

Shapiro collaborated with The Rolling Stones' guitarist Keith Richards on a children's book called Gus & Me, which was published in 2014, and reached No.2 on The New York Times Best Seller list for children's books. His previous book, Other People's Love Letters, was published in 2007.

He graduated from Wesleyan University.
