= Summer Rayne Oakes =

American model, environmental activist, author and entrepreneur

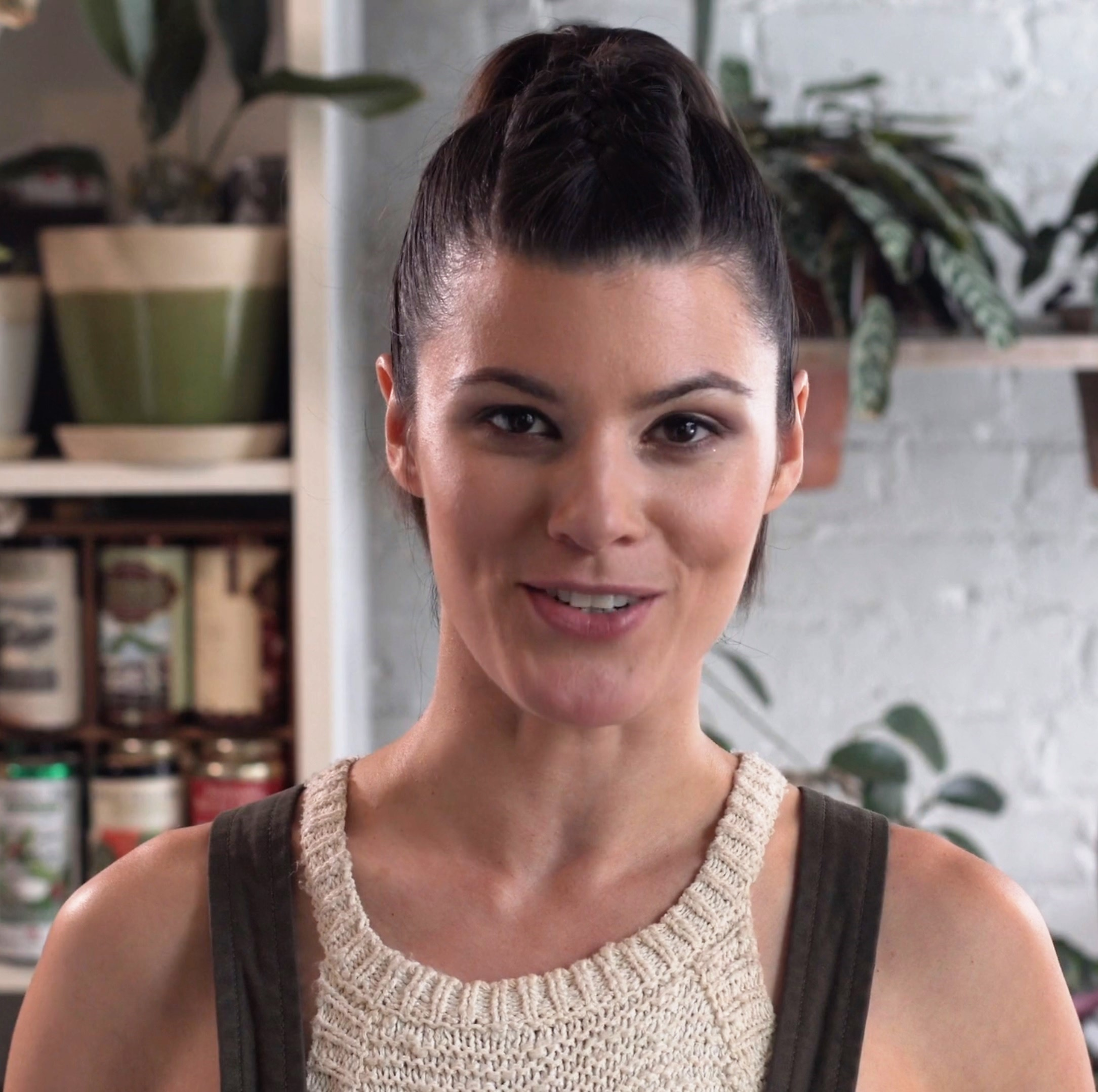
- Oakes discussing her Houseplant Masterclass in 2018
- Born: Summer Rayne Hyacinth Oakes; June 1984 (age 42); Clarks Summit, Pennsylvania, U.S.
- Modeling information
- Height: 5 ft 10 in (178 cm)
- Website: summerrayne.net

Summer Rayne Hyacinth Oakes (born June 1984) is an American fashion model, environmental activist, author, and entrepreneur, known as the first "eco-model". Oakes grew up in rural Pennsylvania, where her concern for the environment began early. She studied ecology in college, where she noticed that scientific papers on the environment received much less attention than popular media. She became a model in New York City, and insisted on only modeling clothing made from organic or recycled materials. These principles cost her work, but gained her notice and the title of first "eco-model".

Besides modeling, Oakes has worked as a writer and editor for fashion magazine Lucire, as a television reporter for environmental network Planet Green, and has written three books: Style, Naturally, a shopping guide to eco-friendly fashion and beauty products; SugarDetoxMe, a book of recipes to remove free sugars; and How to Make a Plant Love You on raising plants in an urban homestead. She also co-founded an award-winning web site, Le Souk, formerly Source4Style, which connects environmentally conscious fashion designers to ecologically friendly fabric producers. She lives in a loft apartment in Brooklyn which she has filled with over 1100 plants, and formerly a pet chicken, who has now passed.

== Early life ==
Oakes was named Summer Rayne due to being born during a downpour in June 1984.

Oakes's concern for the environment began early: while growing up, she would post photographs of appliances and dead animals left alongside local roads, hoping to shame the owners into removing their litter. While she attended Lakeland High School, she also worked at the Lackawanna County Conservation District biosolids program, which applied treated sewage sludge onto farmland. After graduating, Oakes earned scholarships, including a Udall Scholarship, to Cornell University, where she studied natural resources, ecology, and entomology. There she jointly published two papers on sludge toxicity and contaminants, but she was frustrated by how she couldn't communicate the relevance of her work beyond a narrow audience of scientists, and noticed how much more attention advertising and media received.

In 2003, while a student at Cornell, Oakes became involved with "The Organic Portraits Project", a project to produce a book of photographs about humanity's connection to nature by New York City photographer John F. Cooper that had been put on hold due to the September 11 attacks. Oakes applied for and got a National Wildlife Federation Campus Ecology fellowship for the project, which was instrumental in moving the project forward. The book Organic Portraits: A Photo Book of Polaroid & Film Images was published in 2015.

== Career ==
=== Model ===
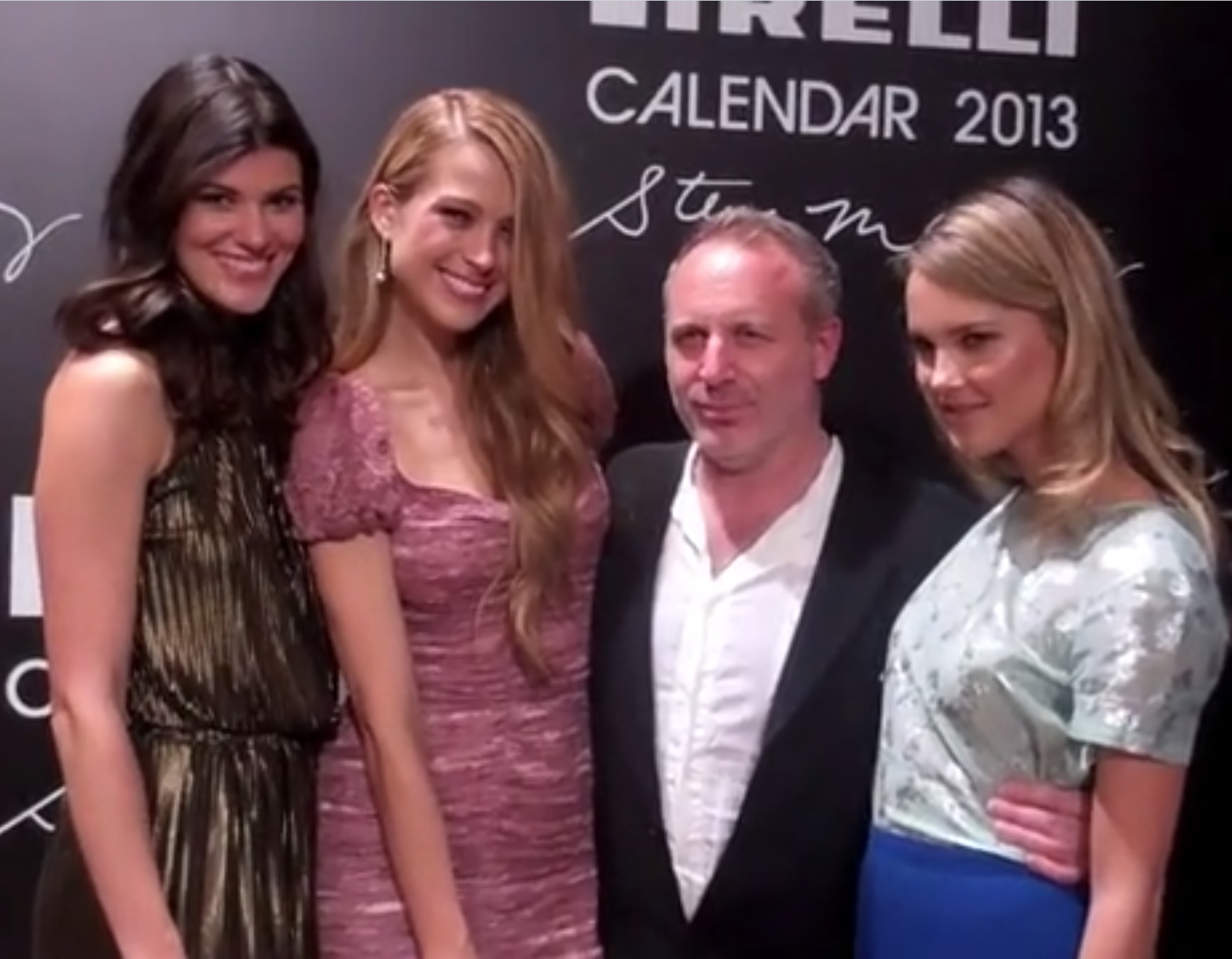
Behind the scenes at the Pirelli Calendar 2013: (left to right) Summer Rayne Oakes, Petra Němcová, Stuart Chapman, Kyleigh Kühn

Oakes began modeling in New York City during her sophomore year in Cornell. Within two months, she was working for lingerie company StockingGirl. When she graduated in 2004, she moved to New York City to model full-time.

The title of world's first "eco-model" was first bestowed on Oakes by Grist Magazine in their 2006 Earth Day issue, since she models only clothes made from organic or recycled materials. The moniker has since been taken up by multiple newspapers in the US, UK, and Canada. These principles lost her multiple campaigns and her first New York City modeling agency contract, before she signed with Faith Kates of Next Model Management, who approved of them.

In 2007, Oakes was profiled in Vanity Fair's "Green Issue", and was featured in a CNN video interview as part of the series "Young People Who Rock". In 2011, Oakes represented Aveeno beauty products in creating a temporary "pop-up" forest in Times Square. She also appeared in an environmental short film, eXtinction, which was shown at festivals around the world. She was photographed for the 2013 Pirelli Calendar by Steve McCurry.

In 2012, designers for the Toyota Prius C said that they created the subcompact hybrid electric vehicle with Oakes in mind and named the "Summer Rain Metallic" paint color after her. Ironically, since Oakes lives in New York City, she does not drive.

=== Activist ===
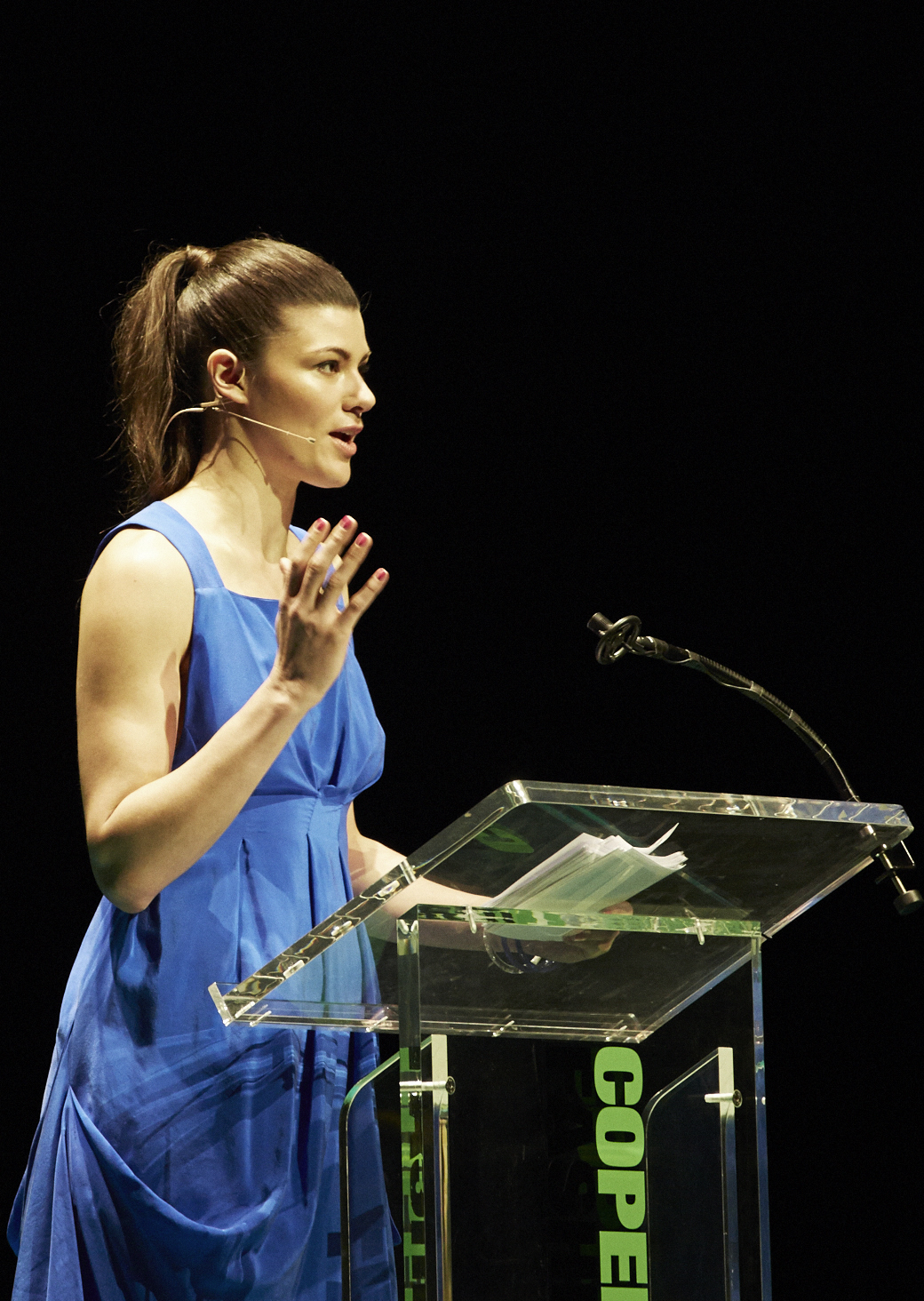
Oakes speaks at the 2014 Copenhagen Fashion Summit.

Oakes says she sees modeling as "a conduit to get into socially responsible causes" such as fair trade and pollution from the textile and garment industry. Since 2009, she has worked to promote the Mezimbite Forest Center conservation project in Mozambique. She spoke about fair trade and the textile industry at the Hong Kong World Trade Organization Ministerial Conference of 2005 and attended the 2012 "Rio+20" United Nations Conference on Sustainable Development, where she was profiled by the magazine of the United Nations Environment Programme. She teaches others to grow plants in a Brooklyn neighborhood community garden.

=== Writer ===
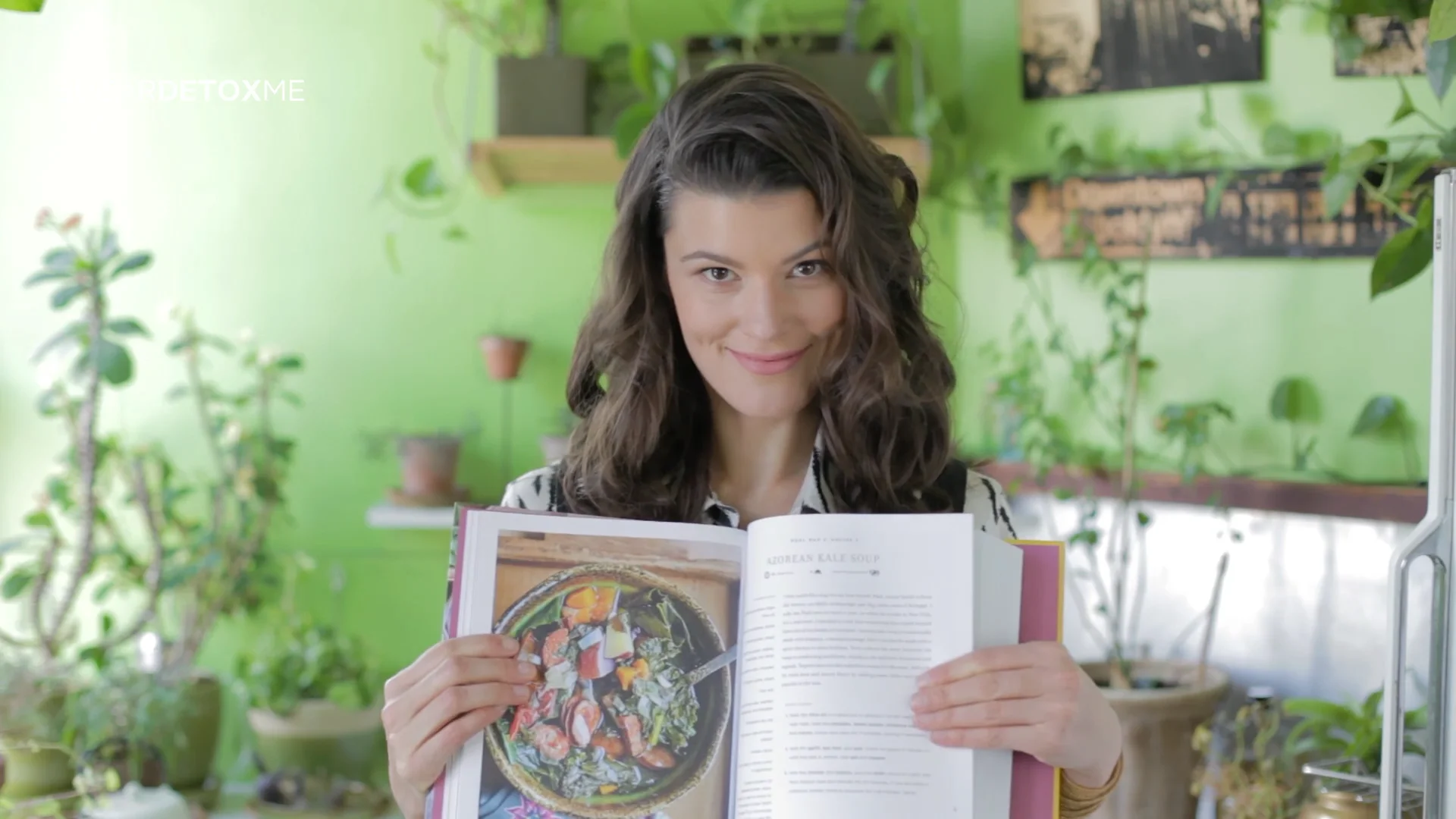
Oakes holding her book SugarDetoxMe in her plant-covered apartment, in 2017

Oakes was interviewed in New Zealand fashion magazine Lucire in April 2005. She went on to write for the magazine, starting with "Behind the Label", a series of articles on ethical and sustainable fashion designers. Oakes became Lucire's acting editor for two issues in 2006, then US editor in 2007, and editor-at-large since then, contributing stories on body image, fair trade, and trends in sustainable design. She hosted the 2007 season of Singapore-based environmental television program Eco 4 the World.

In 2008, Oakes became an environmental reporter on Planet Green, an environmental-focused network from Discovery Communications. She served as a correspondent for the program G Word, during which she reported from a methane-recapture farm, climbed windmills, and swam in the Pacific Trash Vortex. She had her own environmentally friendly fashion and beauty advice column "Ask Summer Rayne" on the Planet Green web site. Discovery relaunched Planet Green with a different focus in 2012.

Oakes launched her first book, Style, Naturally, in early 2009. It is a shopping guide to eco-friendly fashion and beauty products.

SugarDetoxMe began as a 2014 blog and website to document Oakes's 30-day removal of free sugars from her diet, then grew to a program to help others do the same. In 2017, it was joined by a book of recipes of the same name, partly based on Dr. Mark Hyman's book The Blood Sugar Solution; Hyman also endorses Oakes's program.

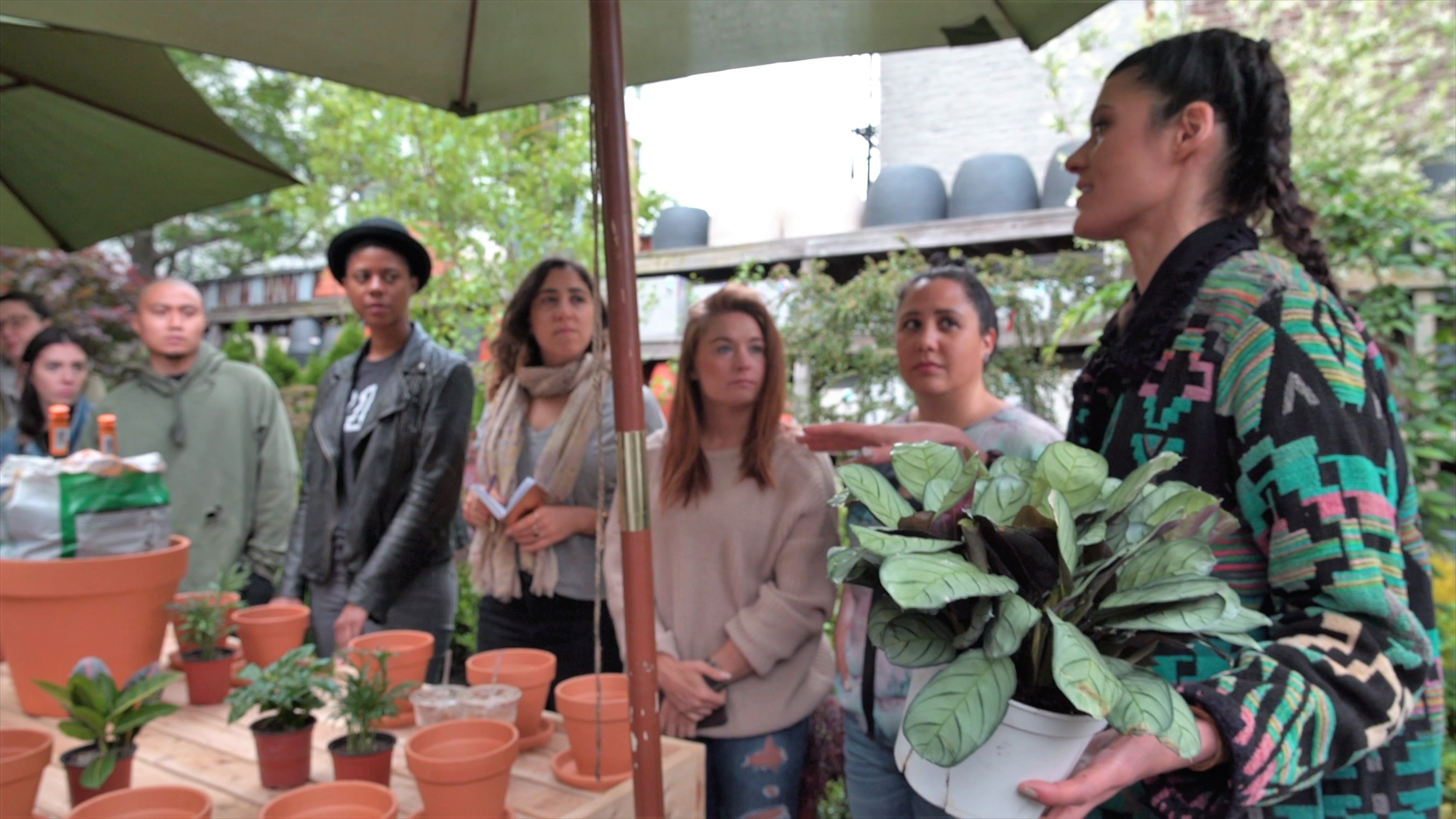
Oakes teaching at a New York City community garden, in 2018

Oakes's third book, How to Make a Plant Love You: Cultivating Your Personal Green Space, scheduled for July 2019, grew out of her experiences with the hundreds of plants she cultivated in her apartment and is accompanied by a website "Homestead Brooklyn", a YouTube series "Plant One On Me", and an online course "Houseplant Masterclass".

=== Entrepreneur ===
In April 2009, Oakes partnered with Payless ShoeSource to create "Zoe & Zac", a line of eco-friendly low-priced shoes and accessories. Products were made of organic cotton, linen, hemp, jute, recycled rubber, and water-based glues and priced at or below $30.

Her website, Le Souk, formerly Source4Style, founded with business partner Benita Singh in 2010, connects environmentally conscious fashion designers to small-scale, ecologically friendly fabric producers. Oakes says that up to 85% of a designer's time is spent sourcing fabric, and the site eases this task for the designer and makes sustainable design possible. Oakes says that companies listed on the site were put through a sustainability questionnaire based on the Eco Index, and their certifications were checked. The site also contains articles about sustainable fashion. Celebrity "curators", including Amanda Hearst, Angela Lindvall, and Ada Zanditon, wrote content for the site. Source4Style won a 2011 Cartier Women's Initiative Award, including $20,000.

== Home ==
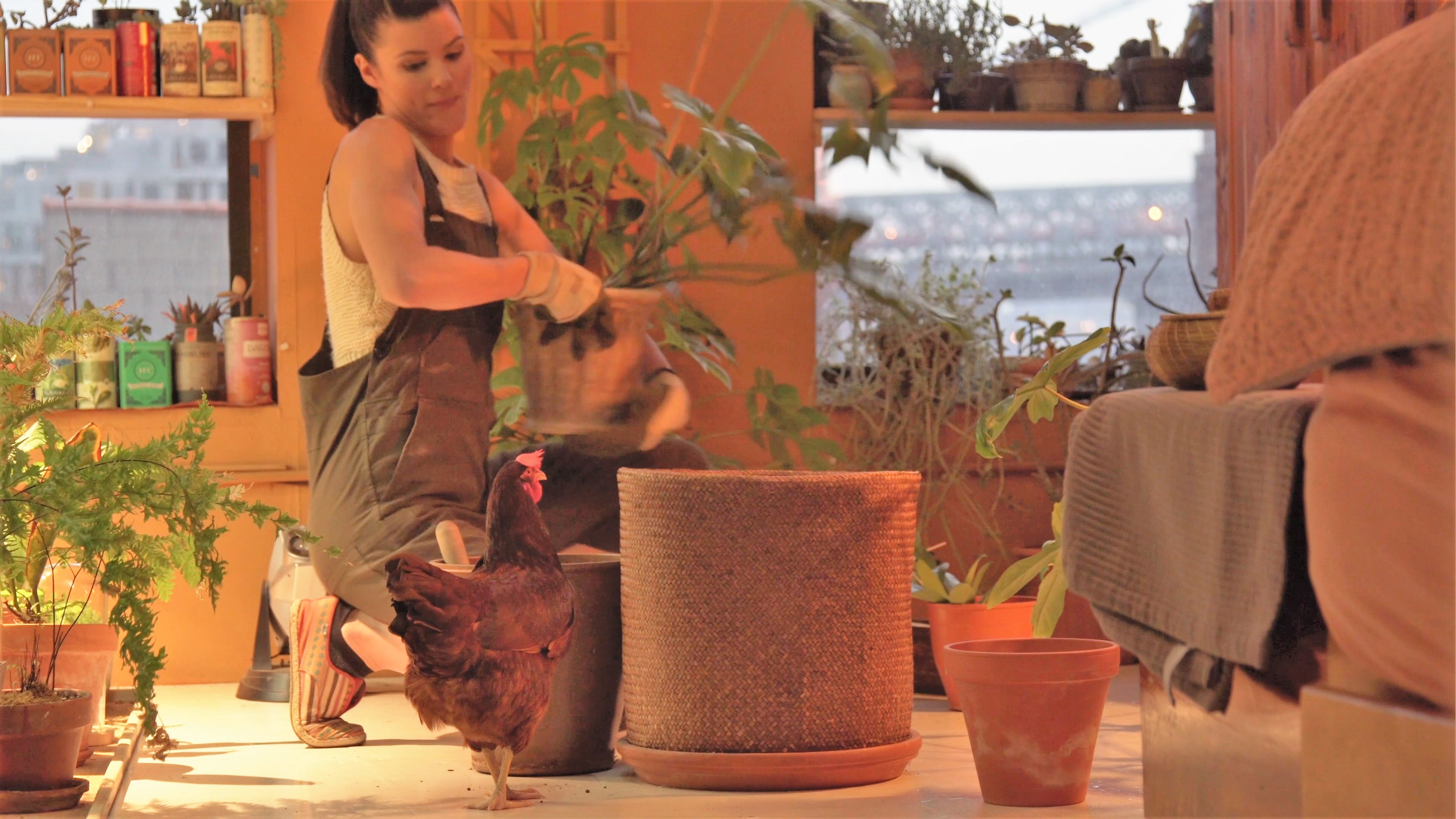
Oakes and Kippee, repotting a Rhaphidophora in her home, in 2018

Since 2005, Oakes has lived in a 1,200-square-foot (110 m^{2}) loft apartment in Williamsburg, Brooklyn, which she has filled with plants: over 500 plants by 2016, and 670 by 2017. A bedroom served as the headquarters of Source4Style for the company's first 18 months. When the company left, Oakes began transforming the room into an indoor vertical garden. Her first plant was a Ficus lyrata, which had grown to 15 feet (4.5 m) tall and conformed to the ceiling by 2016. Other plants include herbs, sweet potatoes, pineapples, bananas, and her favorite genus, Peperomia. Her kitchen hosts a mason-jar plant garden that Oakes built with her father, as well as compost and vermiculture bins. A closet is filled with kitchen plants, succulents live in the bathroom, and vines drape over walls and furniture. The plants take 30 minutes each day to water, and 90 minutes each weekend to fertilize and prune.

In June 2017 Oakes began to foster a Rhode Island Red hen that was an abandoned Easter gift. Oakes named her Kippee (from Dutch: Kippetje, lit. 'little chicken') and took her on the street in a bird carrier, on the subway, and to photo shoots, attracting attention from media and passersby. Eventually Kippee got photo shoots of her own, including commercials for Lululemon and Celestial Seasonings tea. Kippee died in November 2019.

== Publications ==
=== Peer-reviewed articles ===
- Harrison, Ellen Z.; Oakes, Summer Rayne; Hysell, Matthew; Hay, Anthony (August 2006). "Organic chemicals in sewage sludges". Science of the Total Environment. 367 (2–3): 481–497. Bibcode:2006ScTEn.367..481H. doi:10.1016/j.scitotenv.2006.04.002. hdl:1813/5295. PMID 16750559.
- Harrison, Ellen Z.; Oakes, Summer Rayne (February 1, 2003). "Investigation of Alleged Health Incidents Associated With Land Application of Sewage Sludges" (PDF). New Solutions: A Journal of Environmental Health Policy. 12 (4): 387–408. Bibcode:2003NewSo..12..387H. doi:10.2190/0FJ0-T6HJ-08EM-HWW8. hdl:1813/5319. PMID 17208785. S2CID 26931475.

=== Books ===
- Oakes, Summer Rayne (December 24, 2008). Style, Naturally: The Savvy Shopping Guide to Sustainable Fashion and Beauty. Chronicle Books. ISBN 978-0811865241.
- Oakes, Summer Rayne (March 8, 2017). SugarDetoxMe: 100+ Recipes to Curb Cravings and Take Back Your Health. Sterling Epicure. ISBN 978-1454923053.
- Oakes, Summer Rayne (July 9, 2019). How to Make a Plant Love You: Cultivate Green Space In Your Home And Heart. Penguin Random House. ISBN 9780525540281.
