= List of Buffalo Bulls in the NFL draft =

This is a list of Buffalo Bulls football players in the NFL draft.

== Key ==
B	Back	K	Kicker	NT	Nose tackle
C	Center	LB	Linebacker	FB	Fullback
DB	Defensive back	P	Punter	HB	Halfback
DE	Defensive end	QB	Quarterback	WR	Wide receiver
DT	Defensive tackle	RB	Running back	G	Guard
E	End	T	Offensive tackle	TE	Tight end

== Selections ==
Year	Round	Pick	Player	Team	Position	Notes
1952	18	206	Les Molnar	New York Yanks	T	
1958	4	44	Frank Woidzik	Los Angeles Rams	T	
1959	25	299	Lou Reale	New York Giants	C	
1964	3	33	Gerry Philbin	Detroit Lions	T	Super Bowl III champion AFL champion (1968); 2× First-team All-AFL (1968, 1969); 2× AFL All-Star (1968, 1969)
1997	4	125	Ed Ellis	New England Patriots	T	
2000	7	233	Drew Haddad	Buffalo Bills	WR	
2008	6	169	Trevor Scott	Oakland Raiders	DE	
2008	7	236	Jamey Richard	Indianapolis Colts	C	PFWA All-Rookie Team (2008)
2010	6	193	James Starks	Green Bay Packers	RB	Super Bowl XLV champion
2011	5	143	Josh Thomas	Dallas Cowboys	DB	
2013	5	147	Steven Means	Tampa Bay Buccaneers	DE	Super Bowl LII champion
2014	1	5	Khalil Mack	Oakland Raiders	LB	NFL Defensive Player of the Year (2016); 4× First-team All-Pro (2015, (Note: Selected as a defensive end and outside linebacker), 2016, 2018); Second-team All-Pro (2020); 9× Pro Bowl (2015–2020, 2022–2024); NFL 2010s All-Decade Team; PFWA All-Rookie Team (2014)
2015	6	214	Kristjan Sokoli	Seattle Seahawks	DT	
2017	7	251	Mason Schreck	Cincinnati Bengals	TE	
2021	3	79	Malcolm Koonce	Las Vegas Raiders	DE	
2026	7	257	Red Murdock	Denver Broncos	LB	
