= Wentworth Primary School =

School in Dartford, Kent, England

Location
- Wentworth Drive; Dartford, Kent, DA1 3NG; England; 51.4458°N 0.1898°E

Information
- Type: Academy
- Motto: Achieving Happily
- Established: 13 April 1951
- Local authority: Kent County Council
- Department for Education URN: 137836 Tables
- Ofsted: Reports
- Head teacher: Lewis Pollock
- Gender: Mixed
- Age range: 3-11
- Language: English
- Hours in school day: 7 hours
- Colors: Blue, Green
- Athletics: Yes
- Newspaper: The Wentworth Arrow
- Website: www.wentworthonline.co.uk

Wentworth Primary School is a primary school in Dartford, Kent, England. In 2017, the Gemili block (named after Olympic sprint athlete and alumni Adam Gemili) was opened.

== History ==
The school was opened in a new building on 13 April 1951. On 1 January 1999 it amalgamated its infant and junior schools, and it became an academy on 1 February 2012. The Adam Gemili block, including 8 new schoolrooms, was opened in 2017.

== Notable former pupils ==
- Keith Richards, musician and songwriter.
- Mick Jagger, musician and songwriter.
- Adam Gemili, sprint athlete.
