= Eco 4 the World =

- Created by: Gerald Molles, Bjorn Sandin, Clive Wright
- Starring: Andrew N. H. Patterson, Summer Rayne Oakes
- Country of origin: Singapore
- No. of seasons: 1
- No. of episodes: 13

Production
- Running time: 22 Minutes

Original release
- Network: CNBC, Arts Central, RTM1
- Release: January 2007 – present

Eco 4 the World is a 13-episode Singaporean documentary television series featuring positive environmental stories from around the world. Stories include projects and initiatives businesses, ordinary people, celebrities and others involved in to make a difference in the environment around the world. The business stories highlight various companies' corporate social responsibility initiatives.

The series is in partnership with the United Nations Environment Programme.

In association with the TV series, an online social network was also developed. It grew rapidly, but was not maintained and has been closed down.

== Production ==
Produced by Singapore-based Big Durian Productions, the half-hour show is hosted by environmental model Summer Rayne Oakes and Andrew Patterson

Stories for the series were shot in countries around the world, including the United States, United Kingdom, Singapore, Malaysia, India, Denmark, Sweden, Portugal, Italy, France, Azerbaijan, Kenya, Burkina Faso, Brazil and more.

The host links were shot in a studio in Singapore.

== Celebrities ==
The series has featured various celebrities including Sting, Alicia Keys, David Duchovny, Ryan Seacrest, Simple Plan, Hoobastank, Simon Webbe, Desmond Tutu, Ian Thorpe, Jackie Joyner-Kersee, Bart Conner, Daryl Hannah, Gavin Newsom, Amy Smart, Ed Begley, Jr., Julia Butterfly Hill and more.

The celebrity features range from clips of them making short appearances to full interviews with footage of them involved in various environmental activities and projects. For example, Sting tells of his project in Costa Rica to protect the rainforests, while Ed Begley, Jr. shows the features of his eco-friendly home.

== Corporate social responsibility ==
Each Eco 4 the World episode features what various large businesses around the world are doing to have a positive impact on the environment. Featured corporations include DHL, Arla Foods, ING, Scania, Petronas, Ebara Corporation, Sodexo, Aarhus United Denmark, Yara International, Johnson & Johnson and more.

== Distribution ==
Eco 4 the World is distributed by Symbiosis Licensing Pte Ltd, a TV content and software distributor from Singapore.

The series was first shown on Arts Central in Singapore and subsequently on CNBC in the US and Europe. As of Spring 2008 it was still being aired there. The series was also shown in various other parts of the world including on RTM1 in Malaysia (where it is still being aired), and on Singapore Airlines and Malaysia Airlines flights.

== Eco 4 the World Foundation ==
This foundation is a non-profit organization designed to empower young people towards positive environmental action. The foundation has participated in a number of projects and activities in conjunction with UNEP. These include Champions of the Earth, Focus on Your World, Passage of Hope and the Burned Tree Exhibition.

=== Champions of the Earth ===
The foundation helped organise this annual UNEP award ceremony in Singapore.

=== Burned Tree Exhibition ===
In April, 2007 the Eco 4 the World Foundation launched this art exhibition in Singapore. The event featured burned trees that had been made into sculptures by Philippe Pastor.

=== Focus on Your World ===
The foundation organized this photo exhibition showcasing hundreds of photos of environmental conditions and events around the world.
