= Lucire =

- February 2007 cover
- US Editor: Summer Rayne Oakes
- Categories: Fashion; Beauty
- Frequency: Monthly; Quarterly
- Publisher: Jack Yan; Aljawhara Al-Otaishan; Miguel Kirjon; Valentin Lapusca
- Total circulation: 65,450 (2006)
- First issue: October 20, 1997
- Company: Jack Yan & Associates; Asia Design Consultants; GoMedia Srl; Sawahel Aljazeera Publishing Co.
- Country: New Zealand; Thailand; Romania; Saudi Arabia
- Language: English; Romanian; French
- Website: lucire.com lucire.net lucirerouge.com
- ISSN: 1175-7515

Lucire (/luːˈtʃɪəreɪ/ loo-CHEER-ay, Romanian: [luˈtʃire]; transl. "Glow") is a fashion magazine that originally began on the web in 1997, before adding a monthly print edition in its home country of New Zealand in 2004, and is now published seasonally, with a monthly for licensees. It is the first fashion partner with the UNEP, an arrangement that began in 2003. In 1999, Harper's Bazaar Australia listed Lucire in its "A-list of Style" supplement. In 2018, Lucire was listed by StyleCaster as one of the "21 International Fashion Magazines That Should Be on Your Radar." In 2022, LUXlife named Lucire its "Most Pioneering Online Fashion Magazine", and in 2025, they awarded it "Best Digital Fashion Magazine". Also in 2025, Global Elite Awards awarded Lucire the honour of "Leading Luxury Fashion & Lifestyle Magazine".

== History ==
At its launch, it was the second online fashion title in New Zealand (after Wellington Polytechnic's Fashionbrat), and the first commercial fashion magazine on the web there. With Fashionbrat lasting only one issue, Lucire is the longest running online fashion magazine in New Zealand. It claims to be the first fashion title to extend its brand from the internet into print, and the first website to launch print editions in more than one country.

Summer Rayne Oakes was made the US Editor in 2007 and subsequently editor-at-large. Stanley Moss serves as travel editor and Elyse Glickman its US west coast editor. Sopheak Seng became its fashion editor in 2010. Qurratulain Wahab edits Lucire KSA in Saudi Arabia. Lucire was founded by Jack Yan, who continues to serve as publisher.

When conceived, the name was not intended to have a meaning; it was only later that the team discovered it was a quaint Romanian term meaning 'the act of glowing or glittering'.

In the early 2000s, Lucire covered new talent alongside more established names. It was one of the first publications to profile actress Gal Gadot, designer Zac Posen, MTV New Zealand presenter and former beauty queen Amber Peebles, and numerous others. In 2003, it was the second-ever New Zealand website to be nominated for a Webby Award.

Print edition cover girls have included Gal Gadot, Laura Vandervoort, Violett Beane, Denise Richards, Javicia Leslie, Camille Hyde, Brittny Gastineau, Vanessa Carlton, Sarah McLachlan, Stacie Jones Upchurch, Nicky Hilton, Theodora Richards, Jennifer Siebel Newsom, Rachel Hilbert, and Andrea Kevichüsa.

== International editions ==
Lucire launched its first international edition in Romania (helmed by Mirella and Valentin Lapusca) in May 2005, claiming to be the first New Zealand fashion magazine to enter the continent, and the first webzine in the world to launch two print editions. A Thai edition, Twinpalms Lucire, launched in 2008 in conjunction with Twinpalms Resort. Additionally, Vox magazine in Qatar was briefly launched in conjunction with Lucire, while a one-off Bahraini edition appeared in 2014. In 2018 Lucire KSA was launched in Saudi Arabia, as a monthly English-language magazine. Lucire KSA is now supplied in the first and business classes of the national carrier Saudia, and in their airport lounges. Lucire Rouge, a US edition, appeared in 2020, extending the magazine's coverage into wellness. A French-language edition of Lucire KSA appeared in 2021.
