= Hard to Hold (film) =

1984 film by Larry Peerce

- Directed by: Larry Peerce
- Written by: Thomas Hedley Jr; Richard Rothstein
- Produced by: D. Constantine Conte; Joe Gottfried; Dana Miller; Kurt Neumann
- Starring: Rick Springfield; Janet Eilber; Patti Hansen
- Cinematography: Richard H. Kline
- Edited by: Don Guidice; Bob Wyman
- Music by: Tom Scott
- Distributed by: Universal Pictures
- Release date: April 6, 1984 (U.S.)
- Running time: 93 minutes
- Country: United States
- Language: English
- Budget: $8 million
- Box office: $11,113,806

Hard to Hold is a 1984 musical drama film directed by Larry Peerce. It was meant as a starring vehicle for Rick Springfield (who, at the time, had a blossoming music career and solid television acting resume, but lacked film credits). The cast included Rick Springfield, Janet Eilber, and Patti Hansen. The film features many Springfield songs which were included on the Hard to Hold soundtrack. Hard to Hold was 1984's 75th most popular movie of the year.

== Plot summary ==
The movie takes place in San Francisco, California in the early 1980s.

James "Jamie" Roberts, a rock star, is used to having his way with women. He meets Diana Lawson (a low-nonsense sort of woman with classier tastes who works as a psychologist with emotionally-challenged children for a living) in a car accident while running away from his fans and his crazy ex-girlfriend and bandmate, Nicky Nides, wearing only a towel after getting locked out of his dressing room.

Lawson, who has never even heard of him, does not swoon at Jamie's attention. Jamie buys her a new car the next day, but she sends it back. He then sends someone to serenade her on her front lawn.

Lawson and Jamie have a one-night stand, then she shows him out, as Lawson decides she is not really interested in anything messy, or getting involved with a rock star. Jamie, on the other hand, is smitten with Lawson.

Jamie eventually gains Lawson's affections, and the two become romantically involved, while Jamie's ex-lover and bandmate, Nicky, still does not want to let go of Jamie, and Jamie's manager believes Jamie's inability to come up with new songs has to do with his relationship with Lawson.

== Cast ==
- Rick Springfield as James Roberts
- Janet Eilber as Diana Lawson
- Patti Hansen as Nicky Nides
- Albert Salmi as Johnny Lawson
- Gregory Itzin as Owen
- Peter Van Norden as Casserole
- Bill Mumy as Keyboardist
- Frank Ronzio as Flower Vendor
- Robert Popwell bass player

== Production ==
Springfield had been performing music and acting for over a decade when his career went to a new level in the 1980s, due to a successful run of singles and a popular role on General Hospital. He was approached to act in the film. He later recalled:

It was one of those guys that said, [Uses an old-time Hollywood voice.] "We can make some money on this, kid." And I thought the script was so awful that I threw it across the room; I remember physically throwing it across the room and saying, "This is a piece of shit." Then they offered me a lot of money and I remember picking it up and saying, "I can make this work!" [Laughs.] Which I didn't, because it was still a crappy movie, but I did my best in it and I still make jokes about it actually ... That's probably the only time I'll say my ego got the better of me was when I did that film. I said, "I can make this work".

Director Larry Peerce said "like everyone else, I was skeptical about using Rick. But he is a marvelous, talented, well-trained young man with a wonderful sense of comedy - and sexy as hell.... Anyone who can make it through the soaps can make it through anything. Then, too, he has that thing that happens to people who've been up and down a few times." Peerce added that Springfield "not only appeals to youth, but to mature women, too - and he's also one of those rare handsome, sexy men who doesn't put other men off."

Springfield said, "The freedom of the movies after TV was like going from a wading pool to the ocean."

The female lead, Janet Eilber, was a former dancer. When she was offered the film, she says, "I thought it would be rated PG. After all, the majority of Springfield's fans are teenage girls. But the script plainly called for a nude love scene. I convinced myself it would be a matter of doing the scene under a sheet or something. But two or three days after we shot the scene I realized there was no sheet and there would be no PG."

In December 1983, Springfield said, "Hopefully it will be the only music movie I'll make, because I want to branch out and stretch my wings. I guess you could say it was just a safer script than some of those I was given. I even looked at one script about a case of mistaken identity where a guy is locked up in a garage with a guy who thinks he's somebody else and is trying to kill him. So the music movie looked pretty good."

The film had to be edited so it would be rated PG rather than R.

Springfield followed making the movie with a tour.

== Reception ==
=== Critical ===
Janet Maslin of the New York Times found the film an exercise in narcissistic excess:

Dripping sweat, with the backstage lights glinting off his jeweled belt and his single earring, James Roberts escapes to his dressing room, collapsing beside the Space Invaders machine. He's drained. He's exhausted. He's a very famous rock star, and he has just whipped another adoring audience into a lather. ... Hard to Hold is a movie for anyone who thinks this sounds like real behind-the-scenes rock-and-roll ambiance and for anyone who thinks Rick Springfield is a real rock star. It's not a movie for anyone else, except perhaps film students, who will find that Larry Peerce has included more weak transitions, conversational clichés, unflattering camera angles and ethnic restaurant scenes in this film's mere 93 minutes than some directors manage in an entire career.

Gene Siskel of the Chicago Tribune had a similar sentiment:

It's too bad something different didn't happen in "Hard to Hold," something right out of that old Mad magazine feature "Scenes We'd Like to See." Springfield bumps into the uptight psychologist and tries and tries to woo her but fails. Then, just when she is having second thoughts about him, he gives up chasing her and rededicates himself to his old girlfriend, to solving her drug problem and to writing beautiful music with her. Not surprisingly, that story probably would have more appeal for the rock audience for which "Hard to Hold" was made.

=== Box office ===
The film opened in seventh place with $3.4 million.

=== Legacy ===
Rick Springfield would later make jokes about the film in his act. He said:

The fans and a lot of people say they don't like it when I make fun of Hard to Hold because a lot of them liked it. I mean, it wasn't War and Peace, and they took it for the light, romantic comedy it was. It had a lot of good music in it and a lot of guys and women have said, "You know, dude, I liked that movie! It was great!" But I was expecting more and it wasn't the right mix involved, I think.
