= Alexandra Richards =

American model (born 1986)

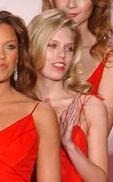
- Richards in 2004
- Born: Alexandra Nicole Richards; July 28, 1986 (age 40); New York City, U.S.
- Spouse: Jacques Naudé
- Children: 2
- Parent(s): Keith Richards; Patti Hansen
- Relatives: Theodora Richards (sister)
- Modeling information
- Height: 5 ft 9.5 in (1.77 m)
- Hair color: Dark blonde
- Eye color: Green

Alexandra Nicole Richards (born July 28, 1986) is an American model, artist, and DJ in New York City. She is the daughter of Rolling Stones guitarist Keith Richards and model Patti Hansen.

== Early life ==
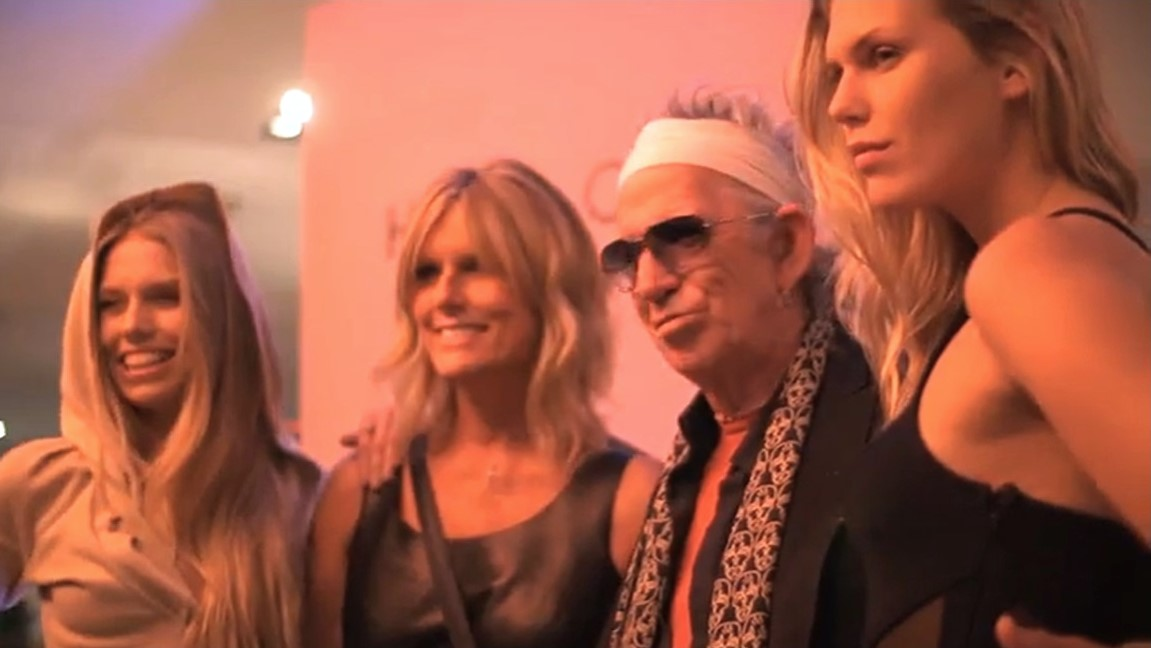
left to right: sister Theodora Richards, mother Patti Hansen, father Keith Richards, Alexandra Richards, in 2011.

Richards is the daughter of Keith Richards and Patti Hansen. She has one full sibling, Theodora Richards, and three older half-siblings from her father's previous relationship. She attended Weston High School in Connecticut.

== Career ==
Her modeling portfolio includes images by Sante D'Orazio, Carter Smith, Annie Leibovitz, Craig McDean, Mario Testino, Bruce Weber, Patrick Demarchelier, Steven Meisel and Tony Kelly. Richards' face has appeared in magazines including Vogue, British Glamour, American Glamour, Italian Glamour, Vanity Fair, ID magazine, Harper's Bazaar, Jane, Teen Vogue, and French Jalouse. In 2010, she appeared in the French edition of Playboy.

She participated in the "Fashion for Relief" show on September 16, 2005, in New York, a benefit for AmeriCares to support victims of Hurricane Katrina.

== Personal life ==
Richards is married to film director Jacques Naudé since 2019. They had a daughter in 2021 and a son in 2025.
