= Patti Hansen =

American model and actress (born 1956)

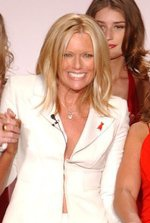
- Hansen in 2004
- Born: Patricia Alvine Hansen; March 17, 1956 (age 70); New York City, U.S.
- Occupations: Model; actress
- Spouse(s): James DePaiva (m. 1981; div. 1983) Keith Richards (m. 1983)
- Children: Theodora Richards; Alexandra Richards
- Modeling information
- Height: 5 ft 9 in (1.75 m)
- Hair color: Blonde
- Eye color: Blue

Patricia Alvine Hansen (born March 17, 1956) is an American model and actress.

== Biography ==
=== Early life and career ===
Hansen, who is of Norwegian ancestry, was born and raised in Tottenville, Staten Island, New York City, the youngest of six children. She was discovered by photographer Peter Gert at age 14. After Gert took Hansen to a party hosted by Wilhelmina Cooper, former model and owner of the Wilhelmina Models, Cooper signed the teen to her agency. Hansen soon moved to Manhattan, enrolled at the Professional Children's School in Manhattan (she would later drop out), and began landing modeling jobs.

During Hansen's modeling career, she appeared on the covers and in the pages of Seventeen, American Vogue, Cosmopolitan, Glamour, and Harper's Bazaar. She also had campaigns for Calvin Klein (for which she featured on a billboard in Times Square), Revlon, Versace and André Courrèges. At the height of her fame, Hansen appeared on the December 1978 cover of Esquire, celebrating "The Year of the Lusty Woman".

In the early 1980s, Hansen stopped modeling and began acting. She appeared in only three feature films, including the 1981 romantic comedy They All Laughed, directed by Peter Bogdanovich, and 1984's Hard to Hold, directed by Larry Peerce and starring Rick Springfield. In 1993, Hansen returned to modeling when designer Calvin Klein used 1970s-era models for his 1993 collection. She was presented on the November 1999 Millennium cover of American Vogue as one of the "Modern Muses". In 2004, Hansen, along with daughters Alexandra and Theodora, was featured in ads for Guerlain's perfume Shalimar Light. In February 2019, she walked the runway for Michael Kors for his Studio 54-inspired Fall 2019 collection.

=== Personal life ===
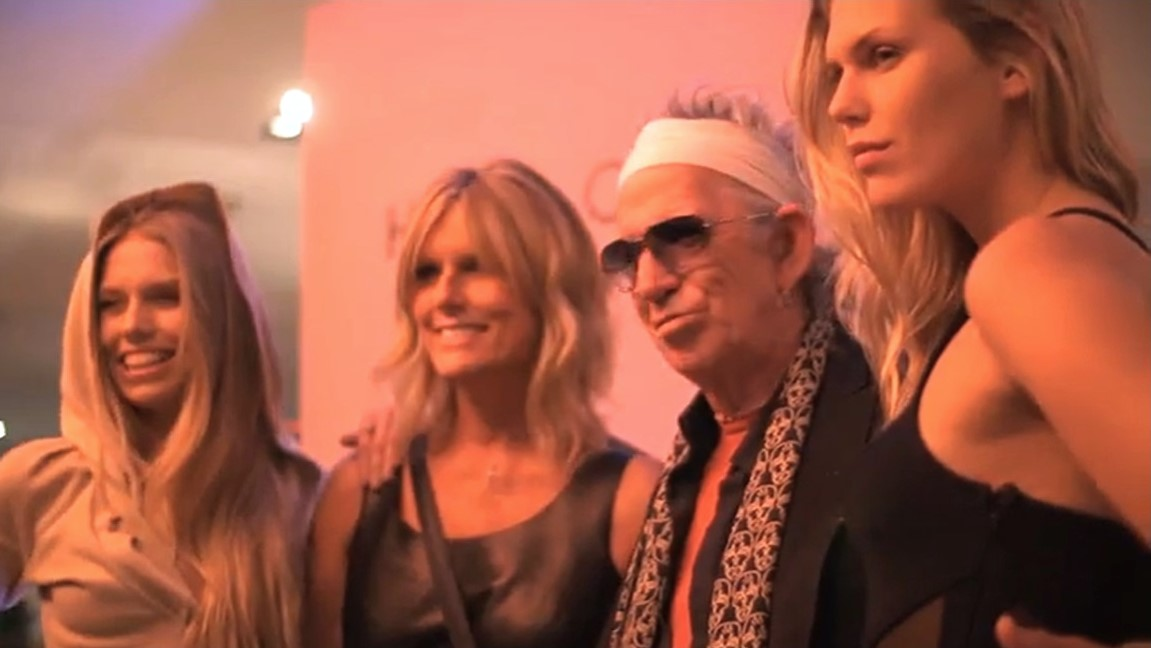
left to right: daughter Theodora Richards, Hansen, husband Keith Richards, daughter Alexandra Richards, in 2011

Hansen married Rolling Stones guitarist Keith Richards on December 18, 1983 (his 40th birthday), at the Finisterra Hotel in Cabo San Lucas, Mexico. She lives in Weston, Connecticut. The couple have two daughters, Theodora and Alexandra. Hansen is a devout Christian.

== Filmography ==
| Year | Title | Role |
|---|---|---|
| 1979 | Rich Kids | Beverly |
| 1981 | They All Laughed | Sam (Deborah Wilson) |
| 1984 | Hard to Hold | Nicky Nides |

== See also ==
- Life, memoir by Keith Richards
