= Jamey Richard =

American football player (born 1984)

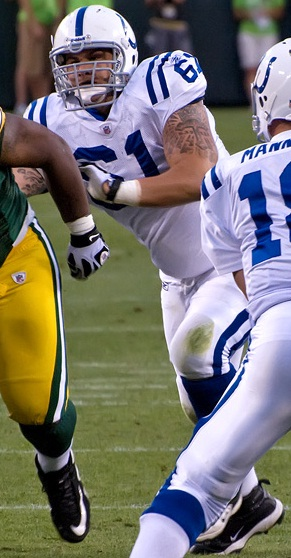
- Richard with the Indianapolis Colts in 2010

No. 61, 71
- Position: Center / Guard

Personal information
- Born: October 9, 1984 (age 42); Weston, Connecticut, U.S.
- Listed height: 6 ft 5 in (1.96 m)
- Listed weight: 295 lb (134 kg)

Career information
- High school: Weston (CT)
- College: Buffalo
- NFL draft: 2008: 7th round, 236th overall pick

Career history
- Indianapolis Colts (2008−2011); New England Patriots (2012)

Awards and highlights
- PFWA All-Rookie Team (2008); Second-team All-MAC (2007)

Career NFL statistics
- Games played: 48
- Games started: 11
- Stats at Pro Football Reference

Jamey Richard (born October 9, 1984) is an American former professional football player who was a center in the National Football League (NFL). He was selected by the Indianapolis Colts in the seventh round of the 2008 NFL draft. He played college football for the Buffalo Bulls.

== Early life and college ==
Richard is the first player from Weston High School to ever play football professionally.

He was named Male Student-Athlete of the Year at Buffalo following his senior season.

== Professional career ==
=== Indianapolis Colts ===
Richard got his first NFL start September 7, 2008, against the Chicago Bears. He replaced Jeff Saturday at center who was injured. On December 28, 2008, against the Tennessee Titans he confidently secured a loose football in the end zone against the visiting Titans, capping a 23–0 shutout. Richard was named to PFW's All-Rookie team for his role on the interior offensive line for the Colts.

On September 12, 2011, he was waived by the Colts. Jameson Richard was re-signed by the Indianapolis Colts.

=== New England Patriots ===
Richard was signed to the New England Patriots on May 25, 2012. He was placed on injured reserve on August 2 after suffering a concussion during training camp.
