= Mezimbite Forest Center =

Conservation project in Mozambique

- Formation: 1994; 32 years ago
- Founder: Allan Schwarz
- Region served: Forest communities in Mozambique
- Website: mezimbite.com

Mezimbite Forest Center is a conservation project in Mozambique which aims to eliminates poverty in forest communities by providing the highest valued jobs that protect and restore the forests of Africa.

It was founded by Allan Schwarz, formerly of the Massachusetts Institute of Technology, in 1994 to produce crafts from Mozambican hardwoods, and to plant trees to replace those used.
