= Theodora Richards =

American model

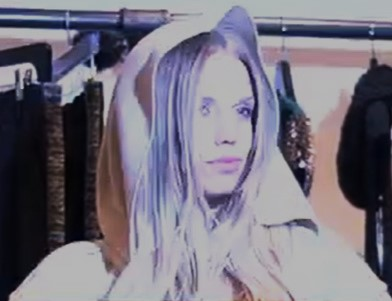
- Richards in 2011
- Born: Theodora Dupree Richards; March 18, 1985 (age 41); New York City, U.S.
- Occupation: Model
- Height: 1.72 m (5 ft 8 in)
- Children: 2 sons
- Parent(s): Keith Richards; Patti Hansen
- Relatives: Alexandra Richards (sister)

Theodora Dupree Richards (born March 18, 1985) is an American model. She is a daughter of Rolling Stones guitarist Keith Richards and Patti Hansen.

== Early life ==
Richards is a daughter of Rolling Stones guitarist Keith Richards and model Patti Hansen. She has one full sister of Alexandra Richards, and three older half-siblings from her father's previous relationship.

== Career ==
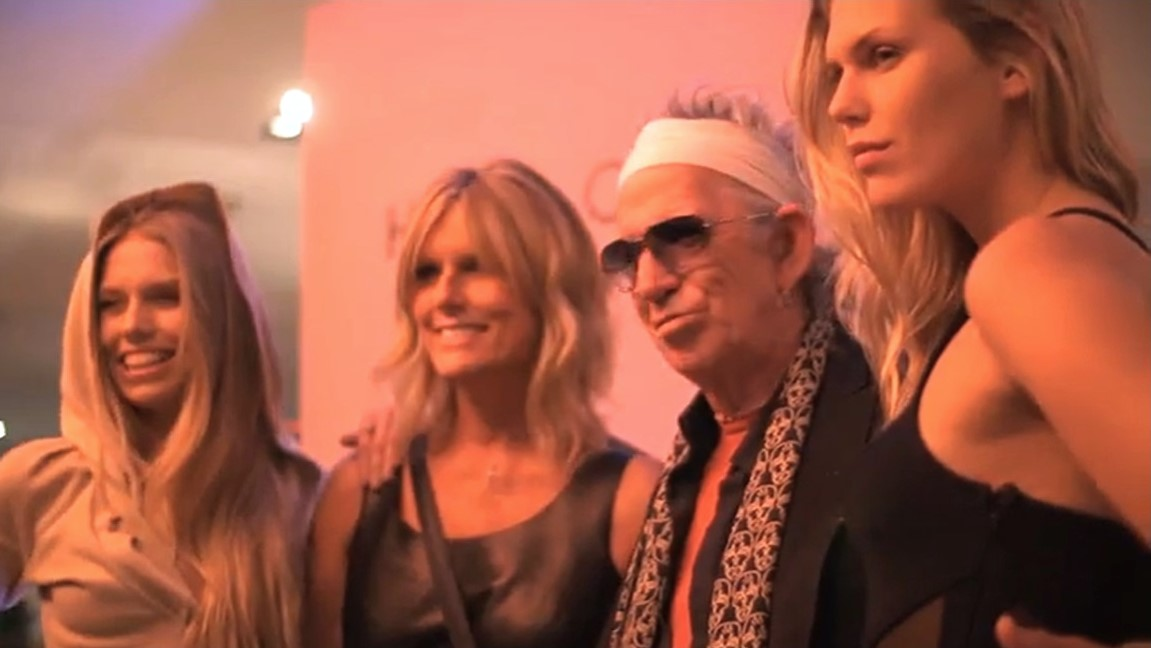
left to right: Richards, mother Patti Hansen, father Keith Richards, sister Alexandra Richards, in 2011.

At 16, Richards, her sister Alexandra, and Elizabeth Jagger (daughter of rock star Mick Jagger) were asked to model for a Tommy Hilfiger campaign. She has guest-edited one issue of L'Officiel. In 2006, Richards modeled for the New Zealand-based Karen Walker label. In mid-2006, she appeared on the cover of Lucire, shot by Barry Hollywood. In 2011, she appeared on the cover of Town & Country with her mother and sister.

Richards also broadcasts a monthly show on SiriusXM called Off The Cuff.

== Personal life ==
She welcomed her first son with Oscar Burnett, born in 2024. She had had her second son, Tarka Nathaniel, in 2026.
