= Melanie Safka discography =

- Studio albums: 28
- Soundtrack albums: 2
- Live albums: 13
- Compilation albums: 14
- Singles: 59

This is the discography of American singer-songwriter Melanie Safka, mainly known mononymously as Melanie.

== Albums ==
=== Studio albums ===
Title	Album details	Peak chart positions									Certifications
Title	Album details	US	AUS	CAN	FRA	GER	NL	NOR	SWE	UK	Certifications
Born to Be	Released: November 1968; Label: Buddah; Formats: LP, 8-track	—	—	—	5	—	8	—	—	—	
Melanie	Released: October 1969; Label: Buddah; Formats: LP, MC, 8-track; Released in the UK as Affectionately Melanie	196	—	—	—	—	2	—	—	—	
Candles in the Rain	Released: April 1970; Label: Buddah; Formats: LP, MC, 8-track, Reel to Reel	17	2	5	—	33	4	20	—	5	RIAA: Gold; AUS: Gold
The Good Book	Released: January 1971; Label: Buddah; Formats: LP, MC, 8-track, Reel to Reel	80	29	26	—	29	—	20	17	9	
Gather Me	Released: October 1971; Label: Neighborhood, Buddah; Formats: LP, MC, 8-track	15	9	14	—	—	—	25	—	14	RIAA: Gold
Garden in the City	Released: November 1971; Label: Buddah; Formats: LP, MC, 8-track	115	38	—	—	—	—	—	—	19	
Stoneground Words	Released: October 1972; Label: Neighborhood; Formats: LP, MC, 8-track	70	69	34	—	—	—	—	—	—	
Madrugada	Released: March 1974; Label: Neighborhood; Formats: LP, MC, 8-track	192	—	—	—	—	—	—	—	—	
As I See It Now	Released: December 1974; Label: Decca; Formats: LP, MC, 8-track	208	—	—	—	—	—	—	—	—	
Sunset and Other Beginnings	Released: October 1975; Label: Neighborhood; Formats: LP, MC, 8-track	—	—	—	—	—	—	—	—	—	
Photograph	Released: November 1976; Label: Atlantic, Neighborhood; Formats: LP, MC, 8-track	—	84	—	—	—	—	—	—	—	
Phonogenic – Not Just Another Pretty Face	Released: March 1978; Label: Midsong International, RCA; Formats: LP, MC, 8-track	—	—	—	—	—	—	—	—	—	
Ballroom Streets	Released: 1978; Label: Tomato; Formats: 2xLP, MC, 8-track; Mix of re-recordings and new material	207	—	—	—	—	—	—	—	—	
Arabesque	Released: May 1982; Label: Blanche, RCA; Formats: LP, MC	—	—	—	—	—	—	—	—	—	
Seventh Wave	Released: October 1983; Label: Neighborhood; Formats: LP, MC	—	—	—	—	—	—	—	—	—	
Am I Real or What	Released: July 1985; Label: Amherst; Formats: LP, MC	—	—	—	—	—	—	—	—	—	
Melanie	Released: 1987; Label: CNR; Formats: CD, LP, MC; Often referred to as 'the Dutch Album', as it was only released in the Netherlands and Belgium	—	—	—	—	—	—	—	—	—	
Cowabonga – Never Turn Your Back on a Wave	Released: April 1988; Label: Baierle, Food for Thought; Formats: CD, LP, MC	—	—	—	—	—	—	—	—	—	
Silence Is King	Released: February 1993; Label: Ariola/Hypertension Music; Formats: CD; Released in the US as a slightly different version as Freedom Knows My Name	—	—	—	—	—	—	—	—	—	
Silver Anniversary	Released: 1993; Label: Ariola/Hypertension Music, Dino; Formats: CD; Album of re-recordings, only released in Germany and the Netherlands in slightly different versions	—	—	—	—	—	—	—	—	—	
Old Bitch Warrior	Released: February 1996; Label: Creastars Europe; Formats: CD; Album of re-recordings, only released in Germany	—	—	—	—	—	—	—	—	—	
Lowcountry	Released: 1997; Label: Self-released; Formats: CD; Features re-recordings, re-workings and new material, sold by mail order and at concerts	—	—	—	—	—	—	—	—	—	
Antlers – A Christmas for True Believers	Released: December 1997; Label: Blue Moon; Formats: CD; Features re-workings and new material; Re-released in 2004 as Yes Santa, There is a Melanie	—	—	—	—	—	—	—	—	—	
Beautiful People	Released: 1999; Label: Brilliant; Formats: CD; Features re-recordings, only released in Europe	—	—	—	—	—	—	—	—	—	
Moments from My Life	Released: April 23, 2002; Label: Disky; Formats: CD; Only released in Europe	—	—	—	—	—	—	—	—	—	
Victim of the Moon	Released: 2002; Label: Afterglow; Formats: CD; Limited advance release and was then commercially released as Crazy Love	—	—	—	—	—	—	—	—	—	
Paled by Dimmer Light	Released: July 5, 2004; Label: Two Story; Formats: CD	—	—	—	—	—	—	—	—	—	
Ever Since You Never Heard of Me	Released: September 2, 2010; Label: Arpeggio; Formats: CD, digital download	—	—	—	—	—	—	—	—	—	
The First Farewell Tour	Released: 2022; Label: Formats: CD; This CD was sold during the last tour of Melanie in the Netherlands that was named "The First Farewell Tour"	—	—	—	—	—	—	—	—	—	
"—" denotes releases that did not chart or were not released in that territory.

=== Live albums ===
Title	Album details	Peak chart positions				
Title	Album details	US	AUS	CAN	GER	UK
Leftover Wine	Released: September 1970; Label: Decca; Formats: LP, MC, 8-track	33	8	22	—	22
Melanie at Carnegie Hall	Released: April 1973; Label: Neighborhood; Formats: 2xLP, MC, 8-track	109	—	—	31	—
In Concert – Live at Montreux	Released: 1973; Label: Buddah; Formats: LP; Germany, Yugoslavia and Greece-only release	—	—	—	—	—
Recorded Live @ Borders	Released: March 2000; Label: DES; Formats: CD	—	—	—	—	—
These Nights	Released: 2001; Label: Mango Gang; Formats: CD	—	—	—	—	—
Olga's Birthday Party	Released: 2005; Label: Self-released; Formats: CD, digital download; Very limited tour release	—	—	—	—	—
Live at Meltdown 2007	Released: February 23, 2009; Label: Odeon Entertainment; Formats: digital download	—	—	—	—	—
Live in Morecambe UK 2008	Released: 2009; Label: Two Story; Formats: 2xCD, digital download	—	—	—	—	—
1984	Released: 2015; Label: Arpeggio; Formats: 2xCD	—	—	—	—	—
Center Stage at Central Park	Released: July 21, 2018; Label: Self-released; Formats: 2xCD, digital download	—	—	—	—	—
Somewhere Under the Rainbow	Released: March 23, 2019; Label: Self-released; Formats: CD, digital download	—	—	—	—	—
Live at Woodstock	Released: July 26, 2019; Label: Sony Music; Formats: digital download	—	—	—	—	—
Melanie Live at Drury Lane 1974	Released: September 26, 2020; Label: Article; Formats: CD, LP; Initially released as part of Record Store Day	—	—	—	—	—
"—" denotes releases that did not chart or were not released in that territory.

=== Soundtrack albums ===
Title	Album details	Peak chart positions
Title	Album details	US
R. P. M.	Released: September 1970; Label: Bell; Formats: LP; Soundtrack to the film of the same name; Recorded two tracks for the album	148
All the Right Noises	Released: August 1971; Label: Buddah; Formats: LP; Soundtrack to the film of the same name	—
"—" denotes releases that did not chart or were not released in that territory.

=== Compilation albums ===
Title	Album details	Peak chart positions	
Title	Album details	US	UK
Please Love Me	Released: 1971 (1973 in U.S.); Label: Buddah; Formats: LP, 8-track, MC; Originally released in Germany (1971) & then U.S. (1973)	—	—
Four Sides of Melanie	Released: March 1972; Label: Buddah; Formats: 2xLP, MC, 8-track	103	23
The Very Best of Melanie	Released: 1973; Label: Buddah; Formats: LP, MC, 8-track; UK-only release	—	—
The Best...	Released: 1976; Label: Buddah; Formats: LP, MC, 8-track	—	—
The Best Of	Released: 1977; Label: Buddah; Formats: LP, 8-track, MC	—	—
Spotlight on Melanie	Released: 9 October 1981; Label: Buddah; Formats: 2xLP, MC; UK-only release	—	—
The Best of Melanie	Released: 1988; Label: Special Music Company; Formats: CD, MC	—	—
The Best of Melanie	Released: August 1990; Label: Rhino; Formats: LP, MC	—	—
The Best of the Rest of Melanie	Released: July 1992; Label: Sequel; Formats: CD; UK-only release	—	—
The Encore Collection	Released: 1997; Label: Collectables; Formats: CD, MC	—	—
Acoustic Blue – The Very Best of Melanie	Released: October 21, 1997; Label: LaserLight Digital; Formats: CD	—	—
Beautiful People: The Greatest Hits of Melanie	Released: July 13, 1999; Label: Buddah; Formats: CD	—	—
The Best of Melanie	Released: August 9, 2003; Label: BMG; Formats: CD, digital download; UK-only release	—	—
The Greatest Hits Legacy	Released: July 2004; Label: Arpeggio 8; Formats: CD	—	—
Working Legend: All Her Hits And More	Released: September 18, 2020; Label: Fanfare Classic; Formats: CD; Australia-only release	—	—
"—" denotes releases that did not chart or were not released in that territory.

== Singles ==
Title	Year	Peak chart positions										Certifications	Album
Title	Year	US	US AC	AUS	BEL (WA)	CAN	GER	IRE	NL	NZ	UK	Certifications	Album
"Beautiful People"	1967	—	—	—	—	—	—	—	—	—	—		Non-album singles
"Garden in the City"	1968	—	—	—	—	—	—	—	—	—	—		Non-album singles
"Christopher Robin" (UK-only release)	1968	—	—	—	—	—	—	—	—	—	—		Born to Be
"Bo Bo's Party" (UK and France-only release)	1969	—	—	—	33	—	—	—	—	—	—		Born to Be
"I'm Back in Town"	1969	—	—	—	—	—	—	—	—	—	—	—	Melanie
"Uptown Down" (France and Netherlands-only release)	1969	—	—	—	—	—	—	—	—	—	—		Melanie
"Tuning My Guitar" (UK-only release)	1969	—	—	—	—	—	—	—	—	—	—		Melanie
"Beautiful People" (re-recording)	1969	— (Note: "Beautiful People" did not enter the Billboard Hot 100, but did peak at #104 on both the Cash Box Looking Ahead Chart and the Record World Singles Coming Up Chart)	—	—	—	—	—	—	8	—	—		Melanie
"Lay Down (Candles in the Rain)" (with the Edwin Hawkins Singers)	1970	6	—	2	49	1	16	—	1	—	—		Candles in the Rain
"Peace Will Come (According to Plan)"	1970	32	—	43	—	15	46	—	6	—	—		Leftover Wine
"Stop! I Don't Wanna Hear It Anymore"	1970	112	—	—	—	—	43	—	8	—	—		R.P.M.
"Ruby Tuesday"	1970	52	—	70	14	25	6	12	—	7	9		Candles in the Rain
"What Have They Done to My Song Ma"	1970	—	—	—	14	—	—	—	—	—	39		Candles in the Rain
"The Good Book"	1971	— (Note: "The Good Book" did not enter the Billboard Hot 100, but did peak #87 on the Cash Box Top 100 and #60 on the Record World singles chart)	—	—	—	—	—	—	—	—	—		The Good Book
"Nickel Song"	1971	35	30	74 (Note: Charted as a double A-side single.)	—	27	43	—	—	—	—		The Good Book
"Please Love Me" (Austria and Germany-only release)	1971	—	—	—	—	—	—	—	—	—	—		Please Love Me
"Brand New Key"	1971	1	5	1	—	1	23	8	8	1	4	RIAA: Gold	Gather Me
"Alexander Beetle" (UK and Europe-only release)	1971	—	—	—	—	—	—	—	—	—	—		Candles in the Rain
"Ring the Living Bell"	1972	31	18	74	—	24	41	—	—	—	—		Gather Me
"Someday I'll Be a Farmer"	1972	106	—	95	—	—	—	—	—	—	54		Gather Me
"Steppin'" (b-side to "Someday I'll Be a Farmer")	1972	— (Note: "Steppin'" was not released as a single but achieved enough airplay to chart at #108 on the Cash Box Looking Ahead Chart and #113 on the Record World Singles Chart)	—	—	—	—	—	—	—	—	—		Gather Me
"Together Alone"	1972	86	—	—	—	37	—	—	—	—	—		Stoneground Words
"Do You Believe"	1973	115	—	—	—	—	—	—	—	—			Stoneground Words
"Bitter Bad"	1973	36	12	49	—	84	—	—	—	—	—		Melanie at Carnegie Hall
"Seeds"	1973	— (Note: "Seeds" did not enter the Billboard Hot 100, but did peak at #102 on the Cash Box Looking Ahead Chart and #110 on the Record World singles chart)	—	—	—	—	—	—	—	—	—		Non-album single
"Will You Love Me Tomorrow"	1973	82	42	93	—	90	—	—	—	—	37		Madrugada
"Love to Lose Again"	1974	— (Note: "Love to Lose Again" did not enter the Billboard Hot 100, but did peak at #123 on the Record World singles chart)	—	—	—	—	—	—	—	—	—		Madrugada
"Lover's Cross"	1974	109	—	—	—	64	—	—	—	—	—		Madrugada
"You're Not a Bad Ghost, Just an Old Song"	1975	— (Note: "You're Not a Bad Ghost" did not enter the Billboard Hot 100, but did peak at #103 on the Record World singles chart and #116 on the Cash Box Looking Ahead Chart)	—	—	—	—	—	—	—	—	—		As I See It Now
"Sweet Misery"	1975	—	—	—	—	—	—	—	—	—	—		As I See It Now
"Yes Sir, That's My Baby" (UK-only release)	1975	—	—	—	—	—	—	—	—	—	—		As I See It Now
"You Can't Hurry Love/Mama Said" (medley; UK and Germany-only release)	1975	—	—	—	—	—	—	—	—	—	—		Sunset and Other Beginnings
"Almost Like Being in Love"	1975	—	—	—	—	—	—	—	—	—	—		Sunset and Other Beginnings
"Cyclone"	1977	— (Note: "Cyclone" did not enter the Billboard Hot 100, but did peak at #107 on the Record World singles chart)	—	—	—	—	—	—	—	—	—		Photograph
"I'd Rather Leave While I'm in Love"	1978	—	—	—	—	—	—	—	—	—	—		Phonogenic – Not Just Another Pretty Face
"Knock on Wood"	1978	—	—	—	—	—	—	—	—	—	—		Phonogenic – Not Just Another Pretty Face
"Oh Boy"	1978	—	—	—	—	—	—	—	—	—	—		Non-album single
"Running After Love"	1978	— (Note: "Running After Love" did not enter the Billboard Hot 100, but did peak at #144 on the Record World singles chart)	—	—	—	—	—	—	—	—	—		Ballroom Streets
"One More Try"	1981	110	—	—	—	—	—	—	—	—	—		Non-album single
"Detroit or Buffalo"	1981	—	—	—	—	— (Note: "Detroit or Buffalo" did not enter the Canadian Singles Chart but did peak at #29 on the Canadian Adult Contemporary Chart)	—	—	—	—	—		Arabesque
"Any Way That You Want Me" (Netherlands-only release)	1982	—	—	—	—	—	—	—	—	—	—		Arabesque
"Foolin' Yourself" (Germany-only release)	1982	—	—	—	—	—	—	—	—	—	—		Arabesque
"Every Breath of the Way" (UK and Europe-only release)	1983	—	—	—	—	—	—	—	—	—	70		Seventh Wave
"Didn't You Ever Love Somebody" (UK and Australia-only release)	1983	—	—	—	—	—	—	—	—	—	—		Seventh Wave
"Dance to the Music" (Germany-only release)	1984	—	—	—	—	—	—	—	—	—	—		Seventh Wave
"Who's Been Sleeping in My Bed"	1985	—	—	—	—	—	—	—	—	—	—		Am I Real or What
"Rag Doll"	1985	—	—	—	—	—	—	—	—	—	—		Non-album single
"To Be a Star" (Netherlands and Australia-only release)	1987	—	—	—	—	—	—	—	—	—	—		Melanie
"Ruby Tuesday" (Special Mix '89; UK and Germany-only release)	1989	—	—	—	—	—	—	—	—	—	—		Cowabonga – Never Turn Your Back on a Wave
"Silence Is King"	1993	—	—	—	—	—	—	—	—	—	—		Silence Is King
"Beautiful People" (with Pop in Wonderland; Europe-only release)	1995	—	—	—	5	—	—	—	—	—	—		Old Bitch Warrior
"Rock in the Road" (Europe-only release)	1995	—	—	—	—	—	—	—	—	—	—		Old Bitch Warrior
"You Don't Know Me" (Belgium-only release)	1996	—	—	—	—	—	—	—	—	—	—		Old Bitch Warrior
"Dust in the Wind" (Netherlands-only release)	2002	—	—	—	—	—	—	—	—	—	—		Moments from My Life
"As Tears Go By" (Netherlands-only release)	2002	—	—	—	—	—	—	—	—	—	—		Moments from My Life
"Jammin' Alone" (Benelux-only release)	2003	—	—	—	—	—	—	—	—	—	—		Paled by Dimmer Light
"Working Legend (My Tribute to Johnny Cash)" (Australia-only release)	2010	—	—	—	—	—	—	—	—	—	—		Ever Since You Never Heard of Me
"People in the Front Row" (alternate 1968 version)	2024	—	—	—	—	—	—	—	—	—	— (Note: "People in the Front Row" did not enter the UK Singles Chart, but did peak at #26 on the Official Vinyl Singles Chart and #30 on the Physical Singles Chart)		Non-album single
"—" denotes releases that did not chart or were not released in that territory.
