= Garden in the City =

Studio album by Melanie
- Released: 1971
- Genre: Pop
- Label: Buddah Records
- Producer: Peter Schekeryk

Melanie chronology
Stoneground Words (1972)	Garden in the City (1971)	Melanie at Carnegie Hall (1972)

Professional ratings
Review scores
Source	Rating
Allmusic	link

Garden in the City is a Melanie album released by Buddah Records in 1971. Although marketed as an album of new recordings it was actually a compilation of "leftover" songs from Melanie's time at that label and released without her consent, after she left to form her own record label. Two of the songs had been previously released on the soundtrack album to the movie R. P. M. (produced by Barry De Vorzon & Perry Botkin, Jr.) in 1970.

The United Kingdom release of the album had a "scratch 'n' sniff" label - on the sleeve with the message "Rub gently to release the magic of Melanie's Garden."

The song "People in the Front Row" was later sampled by Australian hip hop group Hilltop Hoods for their song "The Nosebleed Section". Melanie was reportedly pleased with the use of her song in this recording.

== Reception ==
In their review, Record World stated that "Melanie fans who can't get enough of her wonderful stuff will pick this one up in quick time."

Allmusic noted that "in fact it isn't too bad" yet conceded that "this curiosity is now remembered more for its scratch 'n' sniff "smell Melanie's Magic Garden" cover than for its content."

== Track listing ==
All songs written by Melanie Safka except where noted.

1. "Garden in the City"
2. "Love in My Mind"
3. "We Don't Know Where We're Going" (Barry De Vorzon, Perry Botkin Jr.)
4. "Lay Lady Lay" (Bob Dylan)
5. "Jigsaw Puzzle" (Mick Jagger, Keith Richards)
6. "Don't You Wait By The Water"
7. "Stop! I Don't Wanna Hear It Anymore" (Barry De Vorzon, Perry Botkin Jr.)
8. "Somebody Loves Me" (Ballard MacDonald, Buddy DeSylva, George Gershwin)
9. "People in the Front Row"

== Charts ==
Chart	Peak position
Australian Albums Chart	38
US Billboard 200	115
US Cash Box Charts	124
UK Albums Chart	19

Singles

Chart	Title	Peak position
U.S Billboard Bubbling Under Chart	"Stop! I Don't Wanna Hear It Anymore"	112
