= Melanie at Carnegie Hall =

Live album by Melanie
- Released: April 1973
- Recorded: 2–3 February 1973
- Venue: Carnegie Hall, New York City
- Genre: Pop
- Label: Neighborhood Records
- Producer: Peter Schekeryk

Melanie chronology
Stoneground Words (1972)	Melanie at Carnegie Hall (1973)	Madrugada (1973)

Professional ratings
Review scores
Source	Rating
AllMusic	2.5/5 stars

Melanie at Carnegie Hall is a 1973 double album released by Melanie and the second concert record after the release of Leftover Wine in 1970. The album contains material from Melanie's Carnegie Hall concerts of February 2 and 3 in 1973.

It is the only Melanie album to contain her Top 40 hit "Bitter Bad" (which was a single-only release).

== Reception ==
In their review of the album, Billboard commented that "the singer's special vocal quality produces an intimate sense of involvement and that is how this LP comes off as a tie between entertainer and listener."

Cashbox noted that the album was "a specially priced and attractively designed two record set...it presents Melanie in the same frame of reference that brought her to such a peak of success on the concert scene where she remains quite happily. With just her voice and her guitar, she smiles and muses through "Brand New Key," "Bitter Bad." "Together Alone" and older material like "Beautiful People" and "Any Guy." Should be a long-range seller."

Record Mirror called it "a very satisfying set, though much of the material is familiar, and the overall standard of sound is good. What emerges most strongly is the quite astonishing rapport Melanie has with an audience . . . she somehow plays with them, lures them. Maybe she's not the greatest singer, but she is a very fine performer."

Allmusic stated that Melanie "sounds like an artist on the verge of a nervous breakdown, battling chronic fatigue syndrome to boot. Over four sides, she struggles through her back catalog and, judging by the performance, does so reluctantly...it's clear her heart's not in it."

== Track listing ==
All songs written by Melanie Safka except where noted.

Disc 1:

1. Introduction (by Alison Steele and Scott Muni of WNEW-FM in New York)
2. "Baby Guitar"
3. "Lay Your Hands Across the Six Strings"
4. "Pretty Boy Floyd" (Woody Guthrie)
5. "Some Day I'll Be a Farmer"
6. "Babe Rainbow"
7. "It's Me Again"
8. "Any Guy"
9. "Brand New Key"
10. "Some Say (I Got Devil)"
11. "Bitter Bad"
12. "Psychotherapy"

Disc 2:

1. "Together Alone"
2. "Beautiful People"
3. "Medley: Hearing the News / Seasons to Change / Peace Will Come"
4. "My Rainbow Race" (Pete Seeger)
5. "I Am Not a Poet"
6. "Ring the Living Bell / Shine The Living Light"
7. "Actress"

== Personnel ==
- Melanie - acoustic guitar, vocals

== Charts ==
Album Charts	Peak position
U.S Billboard Chart	109
U.S Cash Box Chart	67
German Chart	31
