= Ballroom Streets =

Studio album by Melanie
- Released: 1978
- Studio: Triiad Recording Studios, Fort Lauderdale, Florida
- Genre: Pop, rock
- Label: Tomato
- Producer: Peter Schekeryk

Melanie chronology
Phonogenic - Not Just Another Pretty Face, (1978)	Ballroom Streets (1978)	Arabesque (1982)

Ballroom Streets is a 1978 double album released by Melanie. The album is essentially a live album but recorded in the studio with a small audience. It mixed new recordings of old songs with some new songs and featured the vocals of the Persuasions. When first issued on CD in 1989, it did not contain "Holding Out", "Any Guy", "Groundhog Day" and "Friends and Company". There was a promotional only 12-inch single with the songs "Cyclone (Candles in the Rain)" and "Running After Love" [Tomato TOM 12D-0004] distributed at the time of the album's release.

== Reception ==
Professional ratings
Review scores
Source	Rating
AllMusic	3/5 stars

In their review of the album, Billboard noted that "this is a marvelous collection of 25 songs that shows Melanie's talents as song stylist, composer and performer. The band is a versatile quintet that rocks, reggaes and provides perfect backing. Melanie's voice is full of surprises. She rocks with maturity and her lyrics are as keen as ever." In their review, Cashbox called it "an elaborate, beautifully packaged album which not only introduces several new Melanie compositions, but contains new renditions...the entire set has a very spontaneous, spirited feel to it."

Record World noted that "Melanie's first album for her new label comes across as her best effort in some time. Recorded entirely live in the studio with an audience of 30 people, this disc captures much of the excitement of a live performance."

The New York Times opined that "Safka has always had a problematic voice, affecting but extremely rough, and it's no more dulcet now."

AllMusic rated it three stars, calling it "a thoughtful and ambitious collection of popular standards."

== Track listing ==
All songs written by Melanie Safka except where noted.

1. "Running After Love" – 4:24
2. "Holdin' Out" – 3:15
3. "Cyclone / Candles in the Rain" – 7:18
4. "Beautiful Sadness" – 5:43
5. "Do You Believe" – 3:52
6. "Nickel Song" – 3:03
7. "Any Guy" – 3:08
8. "What Have They Done to My Song Ma" – 4:17
9. "I Believe" – 3:49
10. "Poet" – 3:50
11. "Save Me" – 6:53
12. "Together Alone" – 3:26
13. "Ruby Tuesday" (Keith Richards, Mick Jagger) – 6:36
14. "Buckle Down" – 3:14
15. "Miranda" (Phil Ochs) – 3:46
16. "Brand New Key" – 3:38
17. "Groundhog Day" – 4:01
18. "Friends and Company" – 6:50

Musicians

- Melanie – acoustic guitar, vocals
- Sal DiTroia – acoustic guitar
- Tony Battaglia – guitar, slide guitar, bass
- Luis Cabaza – keyboards
- Robbie Georgia – dobro, rhythm guitar, backing vocals
- Stan Kipper – drums, backing vocals
- Bob Leone – bass
- John Tegthoff – organ, backing vocals
- Mary McCaffrey – vocals
- The Persuasions – backing vocals
- T.C. – backing vocals

Technical

- Peter Schekeryk – producer
- Michael Laskow, Paul Kaminsky – engineer
- Paul K Saxenmeyer – assistant engineer
- Benno Friedman – cover photography
- Gregg Lamping – tech engineer

== Charts ==
Album Charts	Peak position
U.S Billboard Charts	207
U.S Cash Box Charts	157
