= Madrugada (Melanie album) =

Studio album by Melanie
- Released: 1974
- Studios: 914 Sound Studios, Blauvelt, New York
- Genre: Pop
- Label: Neighborhood
- Producer: Peter Schekeryk

Melanie chronology
Melanie at Carnegie Hall (1973)	Madrugada (1974)	As I See It Now (1974)

Madrugada (English: Dawn) is a 1974 album released by Melanie featuring the singles "Lover's Cross" and "Love to Lose Again". In November 1973, "Will You Love Me Tomorrow" became a Top 40 hit in the United Kingdom and was subsequently added to the British release of the album.

The album consists of leftover material from the 1972 sessions for Stoneground Words which was initially conceived as a double album. As with Gather Me, the album featured arrangements and conduction by Roger Kellaway.

The word madrugada is Portuguese and Spanish for the time of the night between midnight and sunrise.

== Reception ==
Professional ratings
Review scores
Source	Rating
AllMusic	3/5 stars

In their review of the album, Billboard stated that "Melanie expands her horizons on this new Neighborhood effort. Her singing is clearer than ever and her writing just as refreshing as she explores new musical ideas."

Cashbox noted that the album was "an interesting and exciting departure from her unique style."

Record World called it "an album that will undoubtedly be her grandest to date. Melanie never sounded better on her own tunes and her unique voice lends itself well to The Stones' "Wild Horses" and Randy Newman's sensitive "I Think It's Going To Rain Today."

AllMusic were more mixed in their praise, conceding the album contained "a few new musical ideas" with "Melanie striding boldly into high-flown, fretful autobiography with some success. As a performer, she was displaying more skill and restraint than ever before. As a songwriter, there were signs that her gifts were on the wane; Madrugada was half covers... nothing on Madrugada is anything less than pleasant."

== Track listing ==
All songs written by Melanie Safka except where noted:

1. "Love to Lose Again"
2. "Lover's Cross" (Jim Croce)
3. "Pretty Boy Floyd" (Woody Guthrie)
4. "Wild Horses" (Mick Jagger, Keith Richards)
5. "I Think It's Going to Rain Today" (Randy Newman)
6. "Maybe Not for a Lifetime"
7. "Holding Out"
8. "I Am Being Guided"
9. "The Actress"
10. "Pine and Feather"

U.K. version

1. "Love to Lose Again"
2. "Lover's Cross" (Jim Croce)
3. "Pretty Boy Floyd" (Woody Guthrie)
4. "Wild Horses" (Mick Jagger, Keith Richards)
5. "I Think It's Going to Rain Today" (Randy Newman)
6. "Will You Love Me Tomorrow" (Gerry Goffin, Carole King)
7. "Maybe Not for a Lifetime"
8. "Holding Out"
9. "The Actress"
10. "Pine and Feather"

== Personnel ==
- Melanie - guitar, vocals
- Sal DiTroia - acoustic guitar, steel guitar
- Hugh McCracken - electric guitar, steel guitar
- Joe Macho, Don Payne - Fender bass
- Allan Schwartzberg, Denny Seiwell - drums
- George Devens, Rick Marotta - percussion
- Chuck Domanico - acoustic bass on "The Actress"
- Roger Kellaway, Ron Frangipane - arrangements

Technical

- Artie Kaplan - contractor
- Brooks Arthur - engineer
- Larry Alexander - assistant engineer
- Pacific Eye & Ear - cover design

== Charts ==
Chart	Peak position
US Billboard Albums Chart	192
US Cash Box Albums Chart	114

Singles

Chart	Title	Peak position
U.S Billboard Hot 100	"Will You Love Me Tomorrow"	82
U.S Billboard Adult Contemporary	"Will You Love Me Tomorrow"	42
U.S Cash Box	"Will You Love Me Tomorrow"	54
UK Singles Chart	"Will You Love Me Tomorrow"	37
Australian Chart	"Will You Love Me Tomorrow"	93
Canadian Chart	"Will You Love Me Tomorrow"	90
U.S Cash Box	"Lover's Cross"	70
U.S Record World	"Lover's Cross"	73
US Billboard Bubbling Under Hot 100	"Lover's Cross"	109
Canadian Chart	"Lover's Cross"	64
