= The Nosebleed Section =

2003 single by Hilltop Hoods

Single by Hilltop Hoods

from the album The Calling
- Released: 2003
- Genre: Australian hip hop
- Length: 3:40
- Label: Obese Records
- Songwriters: Matthew David Lambert, Daniel Howe Smith, Barry John M. Francis (DJ Debris), Melanie Safka
- Producer: Hilltop Hoods

Hilltop Hoods singles chronology
"Dumb Enough" (2003)	"The Nosebleed Section" (2003)	"Clown Prince" (2006)

"The Nosebleed Section" is a song by the Australian hip-hop group Hilltop Hoods. It was released as a radio single in 2003, and was the final single release from their 2003 album The Calling. The chorus and backing beat of "The Nosebleed Section" are sampled from the song "People in the Front Row" written and sung by Melanie Safka from her 1971 album Garden in the City.

The lyrics of the song deal with upbeat themes of parties, concerts, good times and living the high life involved in an MC's career. Matt Lambert (MC Suffa) said, "That was definitely a turning point for us. When Triple J started playing it, that was our break. We started getting a lot of festival gigs, show offers, stuff like that."

The song placed at number 9 on the Triple J Hottest 100, 2003. In 2025 the song was voted 2nd in the Triple J Hottest 100 of Australian Songs.

In 2009, it was voted Number 17 in the Hottest 100 of All Time, and in 2013 it was voted Number 4 in the Hottest 100 of the Past 20 Years, making it the highest-placed Australian song and the highest-placed hip-hop song in both countdowns as well as the highest-placed song from the 21st century in the former despite never being released as a physical single.

The song appeared on the Nine Network crime drama television series Stingers during its final season in 2004, in a montage sequence focused on Jacinta Stapleton's character, Christina Dichiera, in the eighth episode.

== Sampling ==
Suffa found a copy of Melanie Safka's Garden in the City album at a thrift store in South Australia. "What attracted me to it was it was 50 cents and I'd never heard of it before," he said. The group initially sampled Safka's song without permission. "We didn't clear it because we didn't know it was going to be a thing. Then we tried to clear it and it turned out her publishing had been sold several times and there were fights over who owned it. Then we finally got it cleared maybe a decade later."

Suffa eventually met Salka when she toured Australia in 2014. "She actually invited me to come down, which was lovely. She played the song, I'm not sure if she always played the song [in her setlist]. In Australia she'd be more inclined to play it. She played it and I got a shout-out, she called me cheeky for sampling it without clearing it. I met her backstage and she was lovely," he said after she died in 2024.

== Charts ==
Chart performance
Chart (2009–2010)	Peak position
Australia (ARIA)	85
Chart (2015)	Peak position
Australia (ARIA)	92
Chart (2021)	Peak position
Australia (ARIA)	75
Chart (2025)	Peak position
Australia (ARIA)	31
Australia Hip Hop/R&B (ARIA)	3

== Certifications ==
Region	Certification	Certified units/sales
Australia (ARIA)	10× Platinum	700,000^{‡}
New Zealand (RMNZ)	Platinum	30,000^{‡}
^{‡} Sales+streaming figures based on certification alone.

== See also ==
- List of highest-certified singles in Australia
