= Stoneground Words =

Studio album by Melanie
- Released: 1972
- Studios: 914 Sound Studios, Blauvelt, New York
- Genre: Pop
- Label: Neighborhood
- Producer: Peter Schekeryk

Melanie chronology
Gather Me (1971)	Stoneground Words (1972)	Melanie At Carnegie Hall (1972)

Stoneground Words is an album released by Melanie in 1972. It contains the singles "Together Alone" and "Do You Believe".

== Production and Development ==
The album was a conscious effort to move away from the pop sensibilities of her #1 song "Brand New Key" and focus on more introspective material. “I saw Stoneground Words as a sort of statement, something that would remind people that 'Brand New Key' was a complete one-off for me."

The project was initially conceived as a double album. The unused tracks recorded during the 1972 sessions would later form the basis of Melanie's 1974 album Madrugada. In 2024, Melanie oversaw the release of a deluxe edition of the album to restore it to its initial double album configuration, stating “it was like restoring a precious antique… no, it was like being handed a bag full of broken china and realizing it was an ornament that you loved when you were younger, but which fell off the shelf and shattered. So you sit there and you piece it back together.”

== Critical reception and legacy ==
Professional ratings
Review scores
Source	Rating
Allmusic	4/5 stars

In their review of the album, Billboard called it "one of the finest packages of her career thus far. The sensitivity and moving lyric line and performance of "Summer Weaving" is just one of the many standouts. "I Am Not a Poet," and the rhythmic "Song of the South" are also exceptional."

Record World 's review mentioned that the "charmingly packaged set is perhaps the best Melanie album yet. "Together Alone" starts things off beautifully, and the rest is consistently fine. Should do big business."

Allmusic praised the album as "mature, intelligent and ambitious" and an "under-heard classic."

in 2017, hip-hop producer and co-owner of Don't Sleep Records, Phoniks sampled Melanie's "Do You Believe?" on his Wu-Tang Clan remix "Back in the Game" amassing over 80 million views on YouTube.

In a 2023 video for Amoeba Music, Josh Kiszka of Greta Van Fleet singled out the record as "very important to me...her voice is unique and her quirky lyric writing and her very unique melody writing is enchanting. She's this total bad ass gypsy queen."

== 1972 Track listing ==
All songs written by Melanie Safka except where noted

1. "Together Alone"
2. "Between the Road Signs"
3. "Summer Weaving"
4. "My Rainbow Race" (Pete Seeger)
5. "Do You Believe?"
6. "I Am Not a Poet (Night Song)"
7. "Stoneground Words"
8. "Song of the South, Based on a Theme from Song of the North, Adapted from the Original"
9. "Maybe I Was (A Golf Ball)"
10. "Here I Am"

== 2015 CD Release (with bonus tracks) ==
1. "Together Alone"
2. "Between the Road Signs"
3. "Summer Weaving"
4. "My Rainbow Race" (Pete Seeger)
5. "Do You Believe?"
6. "I Am Not a Poet (Night Song)"
7. "Stoneground Words"
8. "Song of the South, Based on a Theme from Song of the North, Adapted from the Original"
9. "Maybe I Was (A Golf Ball)"
10. "Here I Am"
11. "Bitter Bad"
12. "Seeds"

== 2024 Deluxe Edition Track listing ==
Disc One

1. "Here I Am"
2. "My Rainbow Race"
3. "Wild Horses" (Mick Jagger, Keith Richards)
4. "Summer Weaving"
5. "Between The Road Signs"
6. "Together Alone"
7. "Maybe Not For A Lifetime"
8. "I Am Being Guided"
9. "I Think It's Going to Rain Today" (Randy Newman)
10. "The Actress"

Disc Two

1. "Pretty Boy Floyd" (Woody Guthrie)
2. "Lovers Cross" (Jim Croce)
3. "Maybe I Was A (Golf Ball)"
4. "Song Of The South"
5. "I Am Not A Poet"
6. "Pine and Feather"
7. "Stoneground Words"
8. "Do You Believe"
9. "Holding Out"
10. "Love to Lose Again"
11. "Here I Am (solo acoustic)"

== Personnel ==
- Melanie - guitar, vocals
- Sal DiTroia - acoustic guitar
- Hugh McCracken - guitar
- Bill Keith - steel guitar
- Don Payne - Fender bass
- Richard Davis, Chuck Domanico - double bass
- Roger Kellaway - piano, arrangements
- Ron Frangipane - organ, harmonium
- Donald McDonald - drums
- Johnny Pacheco - congas
- Al Cohn - tenor saxophone

Technical

- Brooks Arthur - engineer
- Tom Wilkes - photography

== Charts ==
Album Charts	Peak position
U.S Billboard Charts	80
U.S Cash Box Charts	37
Australian Charts (Kent Music Report)	69
Canadian Charts	34
Yugoslavian Charts	5

Singles Charts	Title	Peak position
U.S Billboard Hot 100	"Together Alone"	86
U.S Cash Box Charts	"Together Alone"	57
Canadian Charts	"Together Alone"	37
U.S Billboard Bubbling Under Chart	"Do You Believe"	15
U.S Cash Box Looking Ahead Charts	"Do You Believe"	108
