= Dumb Enough =

Single by Hilltop Hoods

from the album The Calling
- Released: 2003
- Genre: Australian hip hop
- Length: 4:02
- Label: Obese Records
- Songwriter(s): Barry Francis: Matthew Lambert; Daniel Smith; William Withers; Stanley McKenny
- Producer(s): Hilltop Hoods

Hilltop Hoods singles chronology
"Testimonial Year" (2003)	"Dumb Enough" (2003)	"The Nosebleed Section" (2003)

"Dumb Enough" is a song by Australian hip hop group Hilltop Hoods. The song was released as the second single from their 2003 album, The Calling. "Dumb Enough" reached #44 on the Triple J Hottest 100, 2003. The hook contains a vocal sample of KRS-One's "Build Ya Skillz".

== Certifications ==
Certifications for "Dumb Enough"
Region	Certification	Certified units/sales
Australia (ARIA)	Gold	35,000^{‡}
^{‡} Sales+streaming figures based on certification alone.
