= Famous Music =

Music publishing division of Paramount Pictures

- Genre: Music publishing, licensing and administration
- Founded: 1928; 98 years ago
- Founder: Famous Players–Lasky Corporation
- Defunct: 2007; 19 years ago
- Fate: Acquired by Sony/ATV
- Successor: Sony/ATV Harmony; Sony/ATV Melody
- Headquarters: United States

Famous Music Corporation was the worldwide music publishing division of Paramount Pictures, a division of Skydance Corporation, since 1994. Its copyright holdings span several decades and include music from such Academy Award-winning motion pictures as The Godfather and Forrest Gump.

== Founding ==
It was founded in 1928 by Paramount’s predecessor, the Famous Players–Lasky Corporation, to publish music from its "talking pictures." Some of the classic songs in the Famous Music catalog that originated in motion pictures include "Thanks for the Memory" (from The Big Broadcast of 1938), "Mona Lisa" (from Captain Carey, U.S.A.), "Silver Bells", "Moon River" (from Breakfast at Tiffany's), "Where Do I Begin?" (the theme from Love Story), "Speak Softly, Love" (the theme from The Godfather), "Up Where We Belong", "Footloose" (from Footloose (film)), "Take My Breath Away" (from Top Gun), and "My Heart Will Go On" (from Titanic (1997 film)).

Famous Music additionally owned music and songs from television programs produced by Paramount until ownership of most of those songs was transferred to CBS in 2006 as part of Viacom's split into two separate companies: CBS Corporation and "new" Viacom. These included the "Theme from Mission: Impossible" (ownership remained with Paramount), the "Theme from Star Trek", and "Where Everybody Knows Your Name" (the theme from Cheers).

Famous Music also provided licensing and administration services for many prominent music catalog owners such as CBS and the Clyde Otis Music Group, as well as for other Viacom divisions including MTV, Nickelodeon and BET.

Starting mostly in the late 1980s and continuing until the company was sold in 2007, Famous Music was active in acquiring songs that did not originate in Paramount motion pictures or television programs. These included the purchase of many works from the Duke Ellington catalog, as well as acquisition or administration agreements with recording artists and producers such as Shakira, Eminem, Akon, She Wants Revenge, Boyz II Men, Paula Cole, The Cunninghams, Björk, Gavin Rossdale, Daniel Powter, Harvey Danger, Martika, KC Porter, Linda Perry, Kike Santander, Irv Gotti, Placebo, Modest Mouse, Jet and P.O.D.

In May 2007, Viacom sold Famous Music to Sony Music Publishing (then Sony/ATV Music publishing), co-owned by Sony and Michael Jackson, for a reported $370 million. Famous Music was then renamed Sony/ATV Harmony and Sony/ATV Melody.

In December 2012, Sony/ATV sold the Famous Music UK song catalogue (which included Placebo and The Kooks) to BMG Rights Management. Paramount Pictures moved the administration of its music to Universal Music Publishing Group sometime in the late 2010s; Paramount Media Networks (excluding Showtime Networks) followed suit in 2020.

== Record label group division ==
For a number of years, Famous Music also had a record label group division that included Blue Thumb Records, Dot Records, Paramount Records, and Tumbleweed Records. In 1974, the division was acquired by ABC Records for $5.5 million, and most of the Famous labels were absorbed into ABC Records.

Famous had distribution deals with Neighborhood Records and Sire Records, the latter of which was distributed by ABC until 1977.

The catalogs of all the ABC/Famous Music labels are now owned by Universal Music Group, with some exceptions. For example, the 1968-1970 catalog of Stax Records, which during that period was owned by Famous, is owned by Concord Music Group, itself distributed by UMG.

Various labels under Universal manage different parts of the catalog depending on the genre. Here are some examples:

- Pop, rock, R&B: Geffen Records
- Country: MCA Nashville Records
- Jazz: Impulse! Records
- Classical: Deutsche Grammophon
- Musical theater: Decca Broadway

== Artists ==
- Hillary Lindsey
- Green Bottle Records
- John Lee Hooker
- Clockwork
- David Tolk
- Jonathan Mead Radford
- Monifah
