= Edwin Hawkins =

American musician and singer (1943–2018)

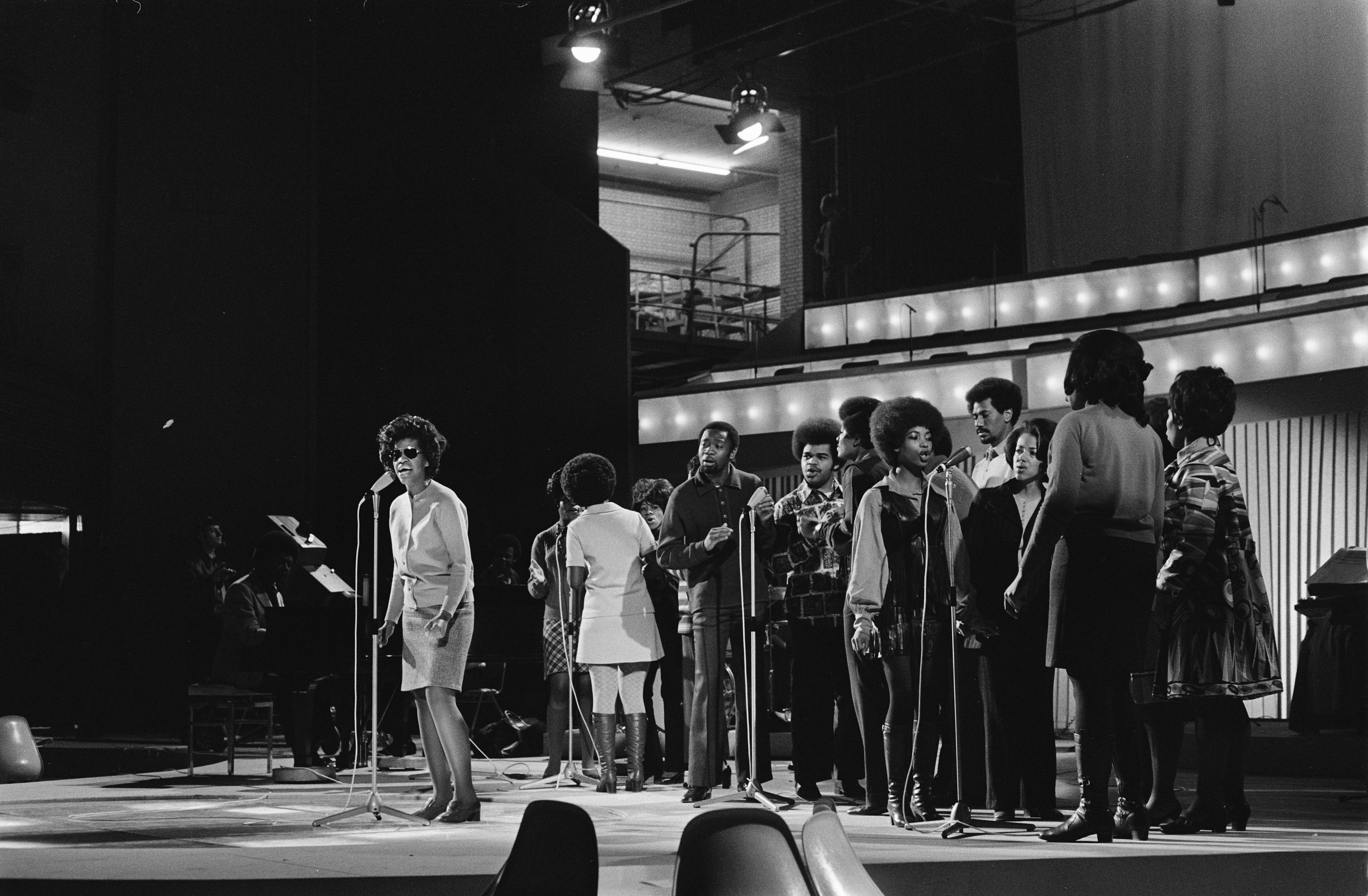
- The Edwin Hawkins Singers performing at the 1970 Edison Awards

Background information
- Born: Edwin Reuben Hawkins; August 19, 1943; Oakland, California, U.S.
- Died: January 15, 2018 (aged 74) Pleasanton, California, U.S.
- Genres: Gospel
- Occupations: Singer, songwriter, producer
- Instruments: Vocals, keyboards
- Years active: 1960s–1990s
- Labels: Pavilion, Buddah, Myrrh

Edwin Reuben Hawkins (August 19, 1943 – January 15, 2018) was an American gospel musician, pianist, vocalist, choir master, composer, and arranger. He was one of the originators of the urban contemporary gospel sound. As the leader of the Edwin Hawkins Singers, he was probably best known for his 1968 arrangement of "Oh Happy Day", which was included on the "Songs of the Century" list. In 1970, the Edwin Hawkins Singers made a second foray into the charts, backing folk singer Melanie on "Lay Down (Candles in the Rain)".

== Biography ==
Hawkins was born in Oakland, California, on August 19, 1943. His younger siblings included Walter Hawkins and Lynette Hawkins. At the age of seven, he was already the keyboardist for the family's gospel music band.

Together with Betty Watson in May 1967, he founded the Northern California State Youth Choir of the Church of God in Christ (COGIC), which included almost fifty members. This ensemble recorded its first album, Let Us Go into the House of the Lord, at the Ephesian Church of God in Christ in Berkeley, California (on the Century 70 custom label owned by LaMont Branch). The choir used this LP to raise funds to travel to the 1968 Youth Congress for COGIC in Washington, D.C. to compete in the Congress' annual choir competition, representing the Northern California region. The choir finished in second place at the contest, and that was the first of many surprises coming their way. Upon their return to California, their LP found its way into the hands of a KSAN underground rock DJ in San Francisco who happened to pick "Oh Happy Day" to play on his station; the song became an instant hit. The soloists on the album were Elaine Kelly, Margarette Branch, Dorothy Combs Morrison (the original lead singer on "Oh Happy Day"), Tramaine Davis (Hawkins), Reuben Franklin, Donald Cashmere, Betty Watson, and Ruth Lyons.

Once "Oh Happy Day" received radio airplay in other parts of the U.S. and the ensemble learned of the song's rising success, they began to contact people in the recording industry who helped them obtain a major contract. The ensemble signed with the newly created Pavilion label (distributed by Buddah), and released a second LP, entitled He's A Friend of Mine, in 1969. But it was "Oh Happy Day" that rocketed to sales of more than a million copies within two months. The song crossed over to the pop charts, making U.S. No. 4, UK No. 2, Canada No. 2, No. 2 on the Irish Singles Chart, and No. 1 on the French Singles Charts, the Netherlands and the German Singles Charts in 1969. It became an international success, selling more than seven million copies worldwide, and Hawkins was awarded his first Grammy Award for the recording. His arrangement of the song was eventually covered by The Four Seasons on their 1970 album Half & Half.

The choir's second LP Top 10 hit on the Billboard Hot 100 chart was the 1970 Melanie single "Lay Down (Candles in the Rain)," on which the label listed the performers as "Melanie with The Edwin Hawkins Singers". The song peaked at No. 6 in the U.S. and Top 10 in several other countries.

In 1990, Hawkins, credited as a solo performer, had a number 89 hit on the R&B chart with "If at First You Don't Succeed (Try Again)".

In the 1992 movie Leap of Faith, Hawkins is the choir master for the gospel songs.

The Edwin Hawkins Singers performance of "Oh Happy Day" at the 1969 Harlem Cultural Festival appears in the 2021 music documentary, Summer of Soul.

Hawkins died of pancreatic cancer on January 15, 2018, in his home, in Pleasanton, California, at the age of 74.

== Discography ==
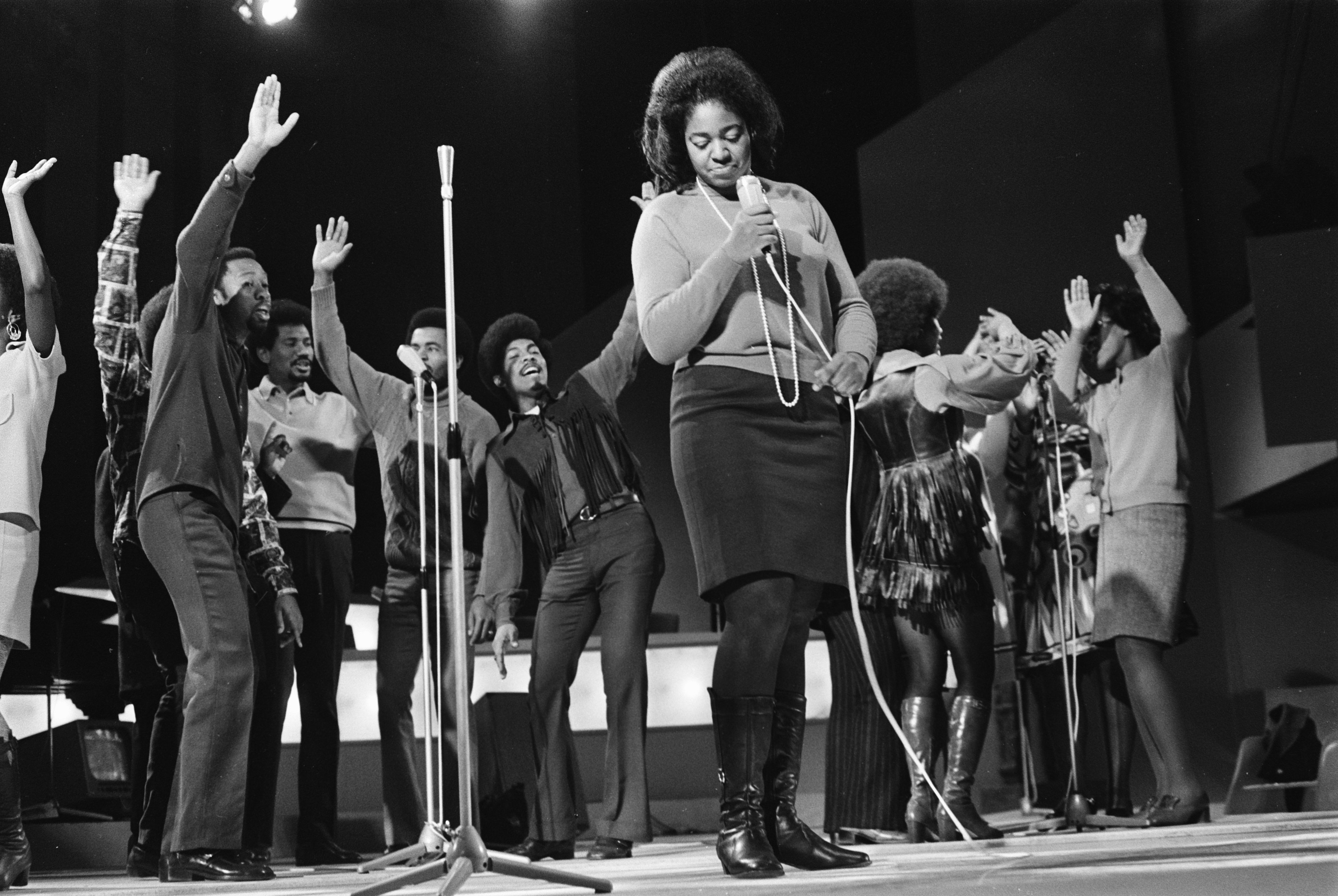
Edwin Hawkins Singers in 1970

=== Albums ===
- 1968: Let Us Go into the House of the Lord
- 1969: He's A Friend Of Mine
- 1969: Peace Is "Blowin' In The Wind"
- 1969: Oh Happy Day (Buddah Records re-issue of previous 1968 LP Let Us Go into the House of the Lord)
- 1969: Jesus, Lover of My Soul
- 1969: Hebrew Boys
- 1969: Lord Don't Move That Mountain
- 1969: Ain't It Like Him
- 1970: Live at the Concertgebouw in Amsterdam
- 1970: Candles in the Rain by Melanie Safka, appearing on "Lay Down (Candles in the Rain)"
- 1970: Pray For Peace
- 1970: More Happy Days
- 1971: Try the Real Thing
- 1971: Children Get Together
- 1971: Freeing the Spirit with Clarence Rivers and the Hawkins Family
- 1972: I'd Like To Teach the World To Sing
- 1973: New World
- 1976: Wonderful
- 1977: The Comforter
- 1977: Edwin Hawkins Presents the Matthews Sisters
- 1979: Edwin Hawkins Live at the Symphony
- 1981: Edwin Hawkins Live with the Oakland Symphony Orchestra
- 1982: Imagine Heaven
- 1982: Edwin Hawkins Live with the Oakland Symphony Orchestra & The Love Center Choir Volume II
- 1983: Edwin Hawkins presents The Music and Arts Seminar Mass Choir
- 1984: Angels Will Be Singing with the Music and Arts Seminar Mass Choir
- 1985: Have Mercy with the Music and Arts Seminar Mass Choir
- 1987: Give Us Peace with the Music and Arts Seminar Mass Choir
- 1988: People in Need with Tramaine Hawkins and the Edwin Hawkins Singers to benefit Homeless USA
- 1988: That Name with the Music and Arts Seminar Mass Choir
- 1990: Face to Face
- 1991: Seminar 91
- 1992: Music & Arts Seminar Mass Choir recorded live in Los Angeles
- 1993: If You Love Me
- 1994: Kings and Kingdoms with the Music and Arts Seminar Mass Choir
- 1995: Anything is Possible
- 1998: Love Is the Only Way

==== Compilations ====
- 1989: 18 Great Songs
- 1998: The Very Best Of

== Awards and honors ==
Altogether Hawkins has won four Grammy Awards:

- 1970: Best Soul Gospel Performance – "Oh Happy Day", performed by the Edwin Hawkins Singers
- 1971: Best Soul Gospel Performance – "Every Man Wants to Be Free", performed by the Edwin Hawkins Singers
- 1977: Best Soul Gospel Performance, Contemporary – "Wonderful!"
- 1993: Best Gospel Choir or Chorus Album – choir director on Edwin Hawkins Music & Arts Seminar Mass Choir – Recorded Live in Los Angeles, performed by the Music & Arts Seminar Mass Choir

In 2007, Hawkins was inducted into the Christian Music Hall of Fame; he attended the formal awards show in 2009.

== See also ==
- List of best-selling gospel music artists
