= Affectionately Melanie =

Studio album by Melanie
- Released: October 1969
- Studios: Wessex, London
- Genre: Pop
- Label: Buddah
- Producer: Peter Schekeryk

Melanie chronology
Born to Be (1968)	Affectionately Melanie (1969)	Candles in the Rain (1970)

Professional ratings
Review scores
Source	Rating
Allmusic	4/5 stars
Rolling Stone	(favorable)

Affectionately Melanie (aka Melanie in the U.S.) is the second album by Melanie Safka. It contains "Beautiful People", a song that Melanie performed at the Woodstock Festival in 1969. In the Netherlands, this album was released as Back in Town.

== Reception ==
In their review of the album, Billboard stated that "her unique style reveals a rich dramatic flair and an extensive range of moods as both performer and composer."

U.K. publication New Musical Express (NME) praised the album as "outstanding", stating that "she succeeds in baring her soul for one and all, and a very complex creature she is too. If a female version of Dylan is possible, then Melanie must rate as the prime contender with her sad, cracked little voice that doesn't even try to conceal the strength below the surface."

Allmusic noted that the album was "a fairly strong pop-flavored singer/songwriter effort, with more serious-minded material and execution than those familiar with only her best-known songs would expect. Although folk-rock is an element here, it's actually just one, combined as well with well-done pop orchestration, a certain sensibility akin to that heard in theatrical musicals, and even a little bit of white soul...Even if her songs occasionally dovetail with childish sentiment, there's just as much earthy realism, as well as some vulnerable loneliness. Don't overlook this in the bargain bins just because of her half-justified reputation as a singer/songwriting lightweight; you might find yourself surprised at how worthy and affecting this early outing is."

== Track listing ==
All songs written by Melanie Safka; except where indicated

1. "I'm Back in Town"
2. "Tuning My Guitar"
3. "Soul Sister Annie" (Thomas Jefferson Kaye; adapted by Melanie)
4. "Any Guy"
5. "Uptown Down"
6. "Again"
7. "Beautiful People"
8. "Johnny Boy"
9. "Baby Guitar"
10. "Deep Down Low"
11. "For My Father"
12. "Take Me Home"

== Personnel ==
- Melanie - guitar, vocals
- John Cameron - arranger

== Charts ==
Chart	Peak position
U.S. Albums Chart	196
Dutch Album Charts	2
