= Leftover Wine =

Live album by Melanie
- Released: September 26, 1970
- Recorded: 1970
- Venue: Carnegie Hall, New York City
- Genre: Pop, folk rock
- Length: 42:47
- Label: Buddah
- Producer: Peter Schekeryk

Melanie chronology
Candles in the Rain (1970)	Leftover Wine (1970)	The Good Book (1971)

Professional ratings
Review scores
Source	Rating
Allmusic	3/5 stars

Leftover Wine is a live album released by Melanie in 1970 on the Buddah label. Production and arrangements were conducted by her husband, Peter Schekeryk. The album was recorded at Carnegie Hall in New York City, except for the closing track "Peace Will Come", which was a studio recording that was released as a single to promote the album.

== Background ==
The concert at Carnegie Hall was the first of Melanie's two appearances in 1970. While Melanie's studio albums typically feature complex arrangements, for the concert Melanie was only accompanied by her acoustic guitar. Melanie's performance displays her most diverse and emotionally compelling vocals. In several instances, she redirects the songs directly to her audience and was actively communicating with them to keep them engaged. The performance featured songs from her previous album, Candles in the Rain and other associated standards like "Momma Momma" and "Happy Birthday". The crowd was ecstatic and as Margie English wrote "She drew strength from them and sang on until she had no more songs. When she rose to leave some of them embraced her, and tears were exchanged". The album is also known as Live: Recorded at Margie's Birthday Party.

The live album was released in September 1970. "Peace Will Come (According to Plan)" was released as a single earlier in the month. It charted at #32 nationally and the album had similar success when it charted at #33. On February 7, 2007 Leftover Wine was re-released in a double compact disc including her other 1970 album, Candles in the Rain. It was distributed by Edsel Records, and included one bonus track for the live album called "Stop! I Don't Want to Hear it Anymore".

== Reception ==
In their review of the album, Billboard Magazine stated that "Melanie is no longer struggling for recognition, she's riding right at the top. This live performance proves that statement. The excitement been totally captured end the audience and the performer are as one."

Cashbox noted that "Melanie wasted no time in releasing this fine package which includes the chart single "Peace Will Come" as well as 11 other self composed tunes. Many of the numbers have been taken from previous albums, but, they are always a refreshing treat. This album looks like it'll be a huge chart item. Watch out for it!

Disc rated the album four stars (outstanding), stating that "the audience loved Melanie, she loved them and listeners will love her too."

In reviewing the album, U.K. publication Melody Maker commented that "there have been a number of bashful comparisons between Melanie and Bob Dylan, and it is worth using this convenience to suggest that if Dylan ls the seer of this generation then Melanie is the archetypal mother earth. Whereas Dylan ls revered for his social analysis Melanie's lyrics are powerful in their simplicity."

Allmusic stated that " Melanie is in strong voice on this recording, her guitar work is adequate if not exceptional, and her communication with her audience is intense and impressive, but while Melanie could push the emotional envelope on her studio sides, there are moments here that suggest she's having a session with her analyst rather than performing for a paying audience."

== Track listing ==
All songs were written by Melanie Safka.

1. "Close to It All" – 3:25
2. "Uptown Down" – 2:53
3. "Momma Momma" – 4:30
4. "The Saddest Thing" – 3:46
5. "Beautiful People" – 4:17
6. "Animal Crackers" – 2:30
7. "I Don't Eat Animals" – 2:10
8. "Happy Birthday" – 0:52
9. "Tuning My Guitar" – 4:00
10. "Psychotherapy" – 4:55
11. "Leftover Wine" – 4:42
12. "Peace Will Come (According to Plan)" – 4:47

== Personnel ==
- Melanie - guitar, vocals
- Al Gorgoni, Sal DiTroia - guitar
- Joe Macho - bass
- Ron Frangipane - keyboards
- Gregg Diamond - drums
- George Devens - percussion
- Artie Kaplan - woodwind

Note: The session personnel only played on the track "Peace Will Come (According to Plan)".

== Charts ==
Album Charts	Peak position
U.S Billboard Charts	33
U.S Cash Box Charts	25
U.K. Album Charts	22
Australian Album Charts	8
Canadian Album Charts	22

Singles Charts	Title	Peak position
U.S. Cash Box Charts	Peace Will Come (According to Plan)	20
U.S Billboard Hot 100	Peace Will Come (According to Plan)	32
Australian Charts	Peace Will Come (According to Plan)	43
Canadian Charts	Peace Will Come (According to Plan)	15
