= Lay Down (Candles in the Rain) =

Single by Melanie

from the album Candles in the Rain
- B-side: "Candles in the Rain" (spoken word)
- Released: March 7, 1970
- Genre: Folk; gospel
- Length: 3:49 (single); 7:39 (full)
- Label: Buddah
- Songwriter: Melanie Safka
- Producer: Peter Schekeryk

Melanie singles chronology
"What Have They Done to My Song Ma" (1970)	"Lay Down (Candles in the Rain)" (1970)	"Ruby Tuesday" (1970)

Live video
- "Lay Down" LIVE '70 on YouTube

"Lay Down (Candles in the Rain)" is the second single from Melanie Safka's 1970 album Candles in the Rain. It was her breakthrough hit in the United States, climbing to number six on the Billboard Hot 100 and number three on the Cash Box Top 100. The record was ranked number 23 on the Billboard Year-End Hot 100 singles of 1970. It was released in March 1970.

== Background ==
The recording was a collaboration between Melanie and the Edwin Hawkins Singers, who had reached the national Top Ten the previous year with "Oh Happy Day". Melanie wrote the song after performing at Woodstock in August 1969. The song describes what she felt as she looked out at the sea of people in the audience. The song's lyrics include the lines "We all sang the songs of peace. Some came to sing, some came to pray, some came to keep the dark away."

== Charts ==
Chart (1970)	Peak position
Australian Singles Chart	2
Belgium (Ultratop 50 Flanders)	15
Belgium (Ultratop 50 Wallonia)	49
Canada Top Singles (RPM)	1
France (IFOP)	4
Netherlands (Dutch Top 40)	1
Netherlands (Single Top 100)	1
U.S. Billboard Hot 100	6
U.S. Cash Box Charts	3
Germany (GfK)	16
Quebec (ADISQ)	3

== Covers ==
Australian singer Max Sharam released the song as a single from her debut album, A Million Year Girl, on July 17, 1995. It reached No. 36 on the Australian ARIA Singles Chart in November 1995. Icelandic singer Emilíana Torrini recorded a version that reached No. 1 on the Íslenski Listinn Topp 40 in mid-1996. American singer Meredith Brooks recorded a version in 1999 on her album Deconstruction that was released as a single; it reached No. 81 in the Dutch Single Top 100 and No. 96 in the German GfK Entertainment charts.

== See also ==
- List of anti-war songs
