= Gather Me =

Studio album by Melanie
- Released: October 1971
- Studio: Allegro Sound Studios, New York City
- Genre: Folk
- Label: Neighborhood (US); Buddah (UK)
- Producer: Peter Schekeryk

Melanie chronology
The Good Book (1971)	Gather Me (1971)	Stoneground Words (1972)

Gather Me is a 1971 album released by Melanie and featuring the US Billboard Hot 100 Singles Chart #1 song "Brand New Key" (a novelty hit which also reached the #1 chart position in Canada, New Zealand and Australia between November 1971 and March 1972). The album also features the singles "Some Day I'll Be a Farmer" and the Top 40 hit "Ring the Living Bell". The album was certified Gold in the U.S. and was arranged by Roger Kellaway.

== Reception ==
In their review of the album, Billboard called it a "beautiful package... she is at her plaintive best with "Little Bit of Me." The imagery of "Baby Day" explores new depths of awareness."

Cashbox noted that the album was a "lovingly designed quilt of songs" singling out "the assertive "Steppin'," the wistful "Little Bit Of Me" and the spirited "Ring The Living Bell" are among her very best works."

Allmusic stated that the album "is one of her most accomplished and confident albums, a set that allowed Melanie the room to indulge her lyrical obsessions while Schekeryk created superb musical accompaniment from her simple but forceful melodies...Gather Me may well be Melanie's finest album, capturing her at the height of her skills as a writer and singer, and it has stood the test of time better than the majority of her work."

Professional ratings
Review scores
Source	Rating
Allmusic	4.5/5 stars
Christgau's Record Guide	B+
The Village Voice	B+

== Track listing ==
All songs written by Melanie Safka; except where indicated

1. "Little Bit of Me"
2. "Some Day I'll Be a Farmer"
3. "Steppin'"
4. "Brand New Key"
5. "Ring Around the Moon"
6. "Ring the Living Bell"
7. "Railroad"
8. "Kansas"
9. "Some Say (I Got Devil)"
10. "Center of the Circle"
11. "What Wondrous Love" (Arranged and adapted by Melanie)
12. "Baby Day"
13. "Tell Me Why" (Michael Edwards, Richard Parish, Sigmund Spaeth)

== Personnel ==
- Melanie – guitar, vocals
- Sal DiTroia – acoustic and electric guitar
- Don Payne – Fender electric bass
- Roger Kellaway – piano, arrangements
- Buddy Saltzman, Donald MacDonald, Robert J. Gregg – drums
- Johnny Pacheco – congas
- Toots Thielemans, Gilbert Chimes, Michael Chimes – harmonica
- George Marge – woodwind
- Artie Kaplan – contractor

Technical

- Bruce Staple – engineer
- Maddy Miller – photography

== Charts ==
Chart	Peak position
Australian Albums Chart	9
Canadian Albums Chart	14
UK Albums Chart	14
US Billboard Albums Chart	15
US Cash Box Albums Chart	12
Norwegian Albums Chart	25

Singles

Chart	Title	Peak position
U.S. Billboard Hot 100	"Brand New Key"	1
Billboard Adult Contemporary	"Brand New Key"	5
US Cash Box Singles	"Brand New Key"	1
UK Singles Chart	"Brand New Key"	4
Australian Chart	"Brand New Key"	1
Canadian Chart	"Brand New Key"	1
US Billboard Hot 100	"Ring the Living Bell"	31
US Cash Box Singles	"Ring the Living Bell"	21
Billboard Adult Contemporary	"Ring the Living Bell"	18
Australian Chart	"Ring the Living Bell"	74
Canadian Chart	"Ring the Living Bell"	24
US Billboard Bubbling Under Chart	"Some Day I'll Be a Farmer"	106
US Cash Box Singles	"Some Day I'll Be a Farmer"	79
US Record World Singles	"Some Day I'll Be a Farmer"	73
Australian Chart	"Some Day I'll Be a Farmer"	95

== Certifications ==
Region	Certification	Certified units/sales
United States (RIAA)	Gold	500,000^{^}
^{^} Shipments figures based on certification alone.
