= The Good Book (album) =

- vinyl album cover (U.S. edition)

Studio album by Melanie
- Released: 1971
- Studio: Allegro Sound Studios, New York City
- Genre: Pop
- Label: Buddah
- Producer: Peter Schekeryk

Melanie chronology
Leftover Wine (1970)	The Good Book (1971)	Gather Me (1971)

Professional ratings
Review scores
Source	Rating
AllMusic	link

The Good Book is a 1971 album released by Melanie and featuring the Top 40 hit "Nickel Song". The album also features "Birthday of the Sun", a track Melanie originally performed at Woodstock in 1969.

The album was the last 'official' Melanie release from Buddah Records - she left the company to form her own label; however several Buddah albums were later issued featuring 'leftover' material from earlier sessions; in addition to several compilation albums.

== Reception ==
Cashbox called the album "her best recording to date. Her songwriting reflects a new maturity and vision; each of her new pieces is wonderfully crafted and performed in the inimitable Melanie fashion."

In a mixed review, Allmusic stated that the album "seemed like a case of two steps forward, one step back" however conceding that "it's worth noting there's no such thing as a Melanie album without a bit of emotional excess, and she speaks her heart and mind with clarity and gentle force on these numbers."

== Track listing ==
All songs written by Melanie Safka except where noted.

1. "Good Book"
2. "Babe Rainbow"
3. "Sign on the Window" (Bob Dylan)
4. "The Saddest Thing"
5. "Nickel Song"
6. "Isn't It a Pity"
7. "My Father" (Judy Collins)
8. "Chords of Fame" (Phil Ochs)
9. "You Can Go Fishin'"
10. "Birthday of the Sun"
11. "The Prize"
12. "Babe Rainbow (Reprise)"

== Personnel ==
- Melanie - nylon guitar, banjo, vocals
- Vinnie Bell - electric guitar
- Sal DiTroia - classical and steel guitar
- Hugh McCracken - classical guitar
- Eric Weissberg - fiddle
- Joe Mack - bass
- Ron Frangipane - keyboards
- Margie English - banjo
- Buddy Saltzman, George Devens - drums, percussion
- Dave Melaney - accordion
- George March - woodwind
- The Pennywhistlers - backing vocals
- John Abbott, Lee Holdridge, Ron Frangipane - arrangements

== Charts ==
Album Charts	Peak position
U.S Billboard Charts	80
U.S Cash Box Charts	45
U.K. Album Charts	9
Australian Album Charts	29
Canadian Album Charts	26
Norwegian Album Charts	20
German Album Charts	29
Swedish Album Charts	17
Austrian Album Charts	6

Singles Charts	Title	Peak position
U.S Billboard Hot 100	"Nickel Song"	35
U.S Cash Box Charts	"Nickel Song"	25
U.S Billboard Adult Contemporary Chart	"Nickel Song"	30
Australian Charts	"Nickel Song"	74
Canadian Charts	"Nickel Song"	27
U.S Cash Box Charts	"The Good Book"	78
U.S Record World Charts	"The Good Book"	60
