= Born to Be (Melanie album) =

Studio album by Melanie
- Released: November 1968
- Studio: Allegro Sound Studios, New York City
- Genre: Pop rock, folk rock
- Label: Buddah
- Producer: Peter Schekeryk

Melanie chronology
Born to Be (1968)	Affectionately Melanie (1969)

Professional ratings
Review scores
Source	Rating
AllMusic	3/5 stars
Rolling Stone	(negative)
Record Mirror	4/5 stars

Born to Be is the debut album by the American singer Melanie, released on Buddah Records in 1968.

Following Melanie's success at the Woodstock Festival in 1969, Buddha repackaged and reissued the album as My First Album.

== Reception ==
In their review of the album, Billboard stated that "The voice is that of a very young girl, but the way she conveys musical thoughts is that of one wise beyond her years. Her non-conformist approach to the selections on this LP make her a new talent to be reckoned with."

Rolling Stone were more cool in their praise of the record, noting that "when she's not busy being Streisand, Temple, Garland and Buffy St. Marie with a little Gracie Allen thrown in on the side, and when she concentrates on being Melanie, she can really get to you. Like on "Momma, Momma," for instance, or "Bo Bo's Party." Her voice, her lyrics, her guitar all work for her to produce a tight unit of action and reaction."

U.K. publication NME called it an "interesting album," calling Melanie "a young lady who sings in a strange, arresting way, as if she cant quite remember the words (or the tune at times). She wrote most of the songs and is a sort of female Dylan."

AllMusic noted that the album was "an intriguing curate's egg. Neither Melanie, nor her producer-husband Peter Schekeryk, seem sure exactly where her strengths lie, so she is cast in a number of roles: Piaf-imitating chanteuse, soul-searching, angst-heavy troubadour, giggling novelty figure and children's entertainer. Stranger still, half the time the experiment works."

== Track listing ==
All songs written by Melanie Safka except where noted.

Side one

1. "In the Hour"
2. "I'm Back in Town"
3. "Bobo's Party"
4. "Mr. Tambourine Man" (Bob Dylan)
5. "Momma, Momma"

Side two

1. "I Really Loved Harold"
2. "Animal Crackers"
3. "Christopher Robin is Saying His Prayers" (words by A. A. Milne)
4. "Close to It All"
5. "Merry Christmas"

== Personnel ==
- Melanie – guitar, vocals
- Roger Kellaway – arranger

=== Technical ===
- Peter Schekeryk – producer
- Bruce Staple – engineer
- Artie Ripp – director

== Charts ==
Chart	Peak position
Dutch Album Charts	8
French Album Charts	5
