= Candles in the Rain =

Studio album by Melanie
- Released: April 1970
- Studio: Wessex, London; Allegro, New York City; Catero Sound, San Francisco
- Genre: Pop
- Label: Buddah
- Producer: Peter Schekeryk

Melanie chronology
Affectionately Melanie (1969)	Candles in the Rain (1970)	Leftover Wine (1970)

Professional ratings
Review scores
Source	Rating
Allmusic	4/5 stars

Candles in the Rain is singer Melanie's third album. Released in 1970, the album produced Melanie's first Top Ten single in North America, "Lay Down (Candles in the Rain)", which was inspired by the crowd's reaction to her performance at Woodstock. The cover of the Rolling Stones' 1967 song "Ruby Tuesday" reached the Top Ten in the United Kingdom.

== Reception ==
In their review of the album, Billboard Magazine stated that "Melanie's song creations and vocal interpretations are widely popular in Europe, and with this LP her success in the U.S. should be assured. "Lay Down (Candles In the Rain)," with the Edwin Hawkins Singers, is her current single and the most exciting cut; other outstanding originals include "Leftover Wine" and "Citiest People." Her versions of "Ruby Tuesday" and "Carolina in My Mind" are definitive."

Cashbox noted that the album "offers her strongest bid to date for album success with this beautifully poetic LP....Melanie should find herself on the charts with this excellent record."

Allmusic stated that "this was where she seemed to truly hit the mark for the first time...If Candles in the Rain was the album that broke Melanie to a larger audience, it did so not just because it featured her biggest hit single to date, but because it matched material and interpretation with greater skill than she had in the past, and it ranks with her finest work."

== Track listing ==
All songs were written by Melanie Safka, unless stated otherwise.

No.	Title	Writer(s)	Length
1.	"Candles in the Rain"		1:42
2.	"Lay Down (Candles in the Rain)" (feat. the Edwin Hawkins Singers)		3:49 (Note: On the original 1970 UK release by Buddah Records (2318009), "Lay Down" is given a timing of 3:49 on both label and sleeve notes;. on the album, however, the track is in fact 7:44 minutes long (from direct timing), but was 3:49 on her Very Best of album.)
3.	"Carolina in My Mind"	James Taylor	3:37
4.	"Citiest People"		3:32
5.	"What Have They Done to My Song Ma"		4:02
6.	"Alexander Beetle (Note: Some versions of the album substituted "Alexander Beetle" with "Close to It All", while other versions have neither song.)"	Melanie Safka; A. A. Milne	2:35
7.	"The Good Guys"		3:08
8.	"Lovin' Baby Girl"		4:20
9.	"Ruby Tuesday"	Mick Jagger; Keith Richards	4:31
10.	"Leftover Wine"		6:06

== Personnel ==
- Melanie – guitar, vocals
- Alan Parker – guitar
- Alan Hawkshaw – keyboards, organ
- Edwin Hawkins – piano on "Lay Down (Candles in the Rain)"
- Harold McNair – fiddle, flute
- Herbie Flowers – bass guitar
- Barry Morgan – drums
- Rico Reyes – congas, percussion on "Lay Down (Candles in the Rain)"
- John Abbott – arrangement on "Lay Down (Candles in the Rain)"; conductor on "What Have They Done to My Song Ma"
- Lee Holdridge – string arrangements on "Citiest People" and "Ruby Tuesday"

== Charts ==
Chart	Peak position
U.S. Billboard Albums Chart	17
U.S. Cash Box Albums Chart	6
Australian Albums Chart	2
Canadian Albums Chart	5
German Albums Chart	33
Norwegian Albums Chart	20
UK Albums Chart	5
Dutch Album Charts	4

=== Singles ===
Chart	Title	Peak position
U.S. Cash Box Charts	"Lay Down"	3
U.S Billboard Hot 100	"Lay Down"	6
Australian Charts	"Lay Down"	2
Canadian Charts	"Lay Down"	1
Netherlands Charts	"Lay Down"	1
U.S. Cash Box Charts	"Ruby Tuesday"	34
U.S Billboard Hot 100	"Ruby Tuesday"	52
German Charts	"Ruby Tuesday"	6
Austrian Charts	"Ruby Tuesday"	2
Belgian Charts	"Ruby Tuesday"	14
Canadian Charts	"Ruby Tuesday"	25
UK Chart	"Ruby Tuesday"	9
Australian Charts	"Ruby Tuesday EP"	70
UK Singles Chart	"What Have They Done to My Song, Ma"	39
Norwegian Charts	"What Have They Done to My Song, Ma"	6
Belgian Charts	"What Have They Done to My Song, Ma"	14

== Certifications ==
Region	Certification	Certified units/sales
United States (RIAA)	Gold	500,000^{^}
Australia (ARIA)	Gold	20,000^{^}
^{^} Shipments figures based on certification alone.
