= Photograph (Melanie album) =

Studio album by Melanie
- Released: 1976
- Genre: Pop
- Label: Atlantic
- Producer: Peter Schekeryk, David Paich, Marty Paich

Melanie chronology
Sunset and Other Beginnings (1975)	Photograph (1976)	Phonogenic – Not Just Another Pretty Face (1978)

Professional ratings
Review scores
Source	Rating
AllMusic	4.5/5 stars
Christgau's Record Guide	C+

Photograph is an album released by American singer Melanie in 1976, her only release on Atlantic Records. The album contains "Cyclone" which was released as a single.

Ahmet Ertegün, who had signed Melanie to his label, was credited with creative direction on the album, was involved with the album's recording, and present at all vocal sessions and mixes.

Despite positive reviews and a publicity tour that saw appearances on American Bandstand, The Mike Douglas Show and The Brady Bunch Hour, the album went largely unnoticed by the public and failed to chart in America. The album was only released in the United States, Australia and New Zealand. For reasons unknown, Atlantic Records pulled the album from distribution shortly after its release.

The album was reissued by Rhino Records in 2005 as an individually numbered limited edition of 3,500 copies. The reissue contained a remastered version of the album plus a second disc of tracks recorded during the same sessions.

== Critical reception ==
The album was heralded by The New York Times as "one of the finest pop albums of the year ... She's a marvelous performer to have back again, and one hopes that this time she will be welcomed not only by her old fans, but by new, grown‐up audiences well." In their review, Cash Box magazine referred to Melanie as "one of our best folk-rock stylists" and that she was "surrounded by excellent instrumental tracks" on the album and that "there is not a weak song in the package". Billboard magazine singled out "Cyclone" as "the most powerful vocally and lyrically and one of the best songs she's ever recorded". Record World also praised "Cyclone", stating that it is "not exactly the type of song one would expect from Melanie, but it's a captivating rocker nonetheless and could storm all the way up the charts". AllMusic noted that the album was "very much Melanie's own victory - her material was a revelation, and more sophisticated than anything she'd ever accomplished before".

== Track listing ==
All songs written by Melanie Safka, except where noted.

1. "Cyclone"
2. "If I Needed You"
3. "The Letter" (Wayne Carson Thompson)
4. "Groundhog Day"
5. "Nickel Song / Music! Music! Music!" (Stephan Weiss, Bernie Baum)
6. "Photograph"
7. "I'm So Blue"
8. "Secret of the Darkness (I Believe)"
9. "Save Me"
10. "Raindance"
11. "Friends and Company"

=== 2005 CD reissue ===
The 2005 CD reissue, Photograph (Double Exposure), contained a bonus disc of material recorded during the Atlantic sessions:

1. "Groundhog Day" (Alternate Version)
2. "Cyclone" (Alternate Version)
3. "Secret of the Darkness (I Believe), Pt. 1"
4. "Secret of the Darkness (I Believe), Pt. 2"
5. "Unfinished Business" (Selma Version)
6. "Whamp Bhomp Song"
7. "Ruby Tuesday" (Mick Jagger, Keith Richards)
8. "Love to Live Again"
9. "Here We Go Again"
10. "Jukebox Magazine"
11. "Miranda" (Phil Ochs)
12. "Unfinished Business" (West Version)
13. "Remember Me Good"
14. "Over the Rainbow" (Harold Arlen, E.Y. Harburg)
- All songs written by Melanie Safka except where noted

== Personnel ==
- Melanie - guitar, vocals
- Dave Doran - guitar, vocals
- Dean Parks, Louie Shelton - guitar
- David Jackson, Jerry Scheff, Jay Wolfe - bass guitar
- David Paich, Jim Drennan - keyboards
- Jeff Porcaro - drums, vocals
- Jim Gordon, John Guerin - drums
- Milt Holland, Victor Feldman - percussion
- Angelo Mauceri - percussion, vocals
- Richard Greene - violin
- Carol Parks, Denny Bell, Edwin Hawkins Singers, Jay Wolfe - backing vocals
- David Campbell - arrangements, viola on "Photograph"
- Art Pepper - saxophone on "I'm So Blue"
- Robin Williamson - mandolin on "Raindance"
- Marty Paich - arrangements

== Charts ==
Album Charts	Peak position
Australian Charts	84
