= R. P. M. =

1970 film by Stanley Kramer

- Film poster
- Directed by: Stanley Kramer
- Screenplay by: Erich Segal
- Produced by: Stanley Kramer
- Starring: Anthony Quinn; Ann-Margret; Gary Lockwood
- Cinematography: Michel Hugo
- Edited by: William Lyon
- Music by: Perry Botkin Jr. Barry De Vorzon; Melanie
- Distributed by: Columbia Pictures
- Release date: September 16, 1970
- Running time: 92 minutes
- Country: United States
- Language: English

R. P. M. is a 1970 American drama film directed by Stanley Kramer, starring Anthony Quinn and Ann-Margret. As the film's poster notes, the title is an initialism for "revolutions per minute", which at the time was a common term for the units of the variable speed control of a record player's turntable and generally a unit of rotational speed for rotating machines. It is a reference to students' smoke-filled drinking parties and how in the 1960s students evolved politically so quickly that they went through many political revolutions in little time.

== Plot ==
In the political tumult of the 1960s, radical student activists occupy a university's administration building with a list of 12 demands. Unable to resolve the situation, President Tyler resigns, so the Board of Trustees considers a student-made shortlist of recommended professors to take over the job of university president. The board finalizes the choice of Professor F.W.J. "Paco" Perez, despite his radical beliefs, given his close past relationship with students, including romantically.

After midnight, Perez, with his sociology graduate student girlfriend Rhoda, is awakened by a phone call by Dean George Cooper, requesting a meeting. Perez is appointed "acting president" of the college campus. Later that morning, Perez arrives to the campus on a motorcycle. Attempting to negotiate with the activists, Perez reads their demands, which include 20 inner-city scholarships, a college reinvestment program, no military research on campus, and an African American on the all-white Board of Trustees. Perez disagrees with three of the 12 demands, including the students' right to hire and fire the faculty.

Perez tells the activists that he will deliver on the first nine demands. A brief conflict between the leader, Rossiter, and Steve Dempsey, leads to the eighth demand changed to the hiring of a Black admissions officer. Perez nominates Dempsey for the position, which the young Black activist accepts. Perez serves as mediator between the faculty and the unwavering student body over the unresolved three demands, while being berated at home by Rhoda for his hypocrisy.

Perez notifies the faculty of an audio-recorded message that Rossiter will destroy the school's computer hardware if the demands are not met. With no options left, Perez sends in a squadron of police officers led by Police Chief Henry J. Thatcher. Thatcher orders the activists to evacuate the facility in three minutes, but they refuse to comply. The officers invade the building, releasing tear gas, and violently arrest several students. At the police station, Perez sees that Rhoda also has been arrested.

Perez meets with the faculty in the administration building, now back under their control. He signs a bail grantee, defending the outcome of the rebellion. Upon leaving the building, Perez walks through the crowd and is loudly booed by the activists.

== Cast ==
- Anthony Quinn as Prof. F.W.J. "Paco" Perez
- Ann-Margret as Rhoda
- Gary Lockwood as Rossiter
- Paul Winfield as Steve Dempsey
- Graham Jarvis as Police Chief Thatcher
- Alan Hewitt as Hewlett
- Ramon Bieri as Brown
- John McLiam as Rev. Blauvelt
- Don Keefer as Dean George Cooper
- Norman Burton as Coach McCurdy
- John Zaremba as President Tyler
- Ines Pedroza as Estella
- Linda Meiklejohn as Student
- David Ladd as Student
- Jose Brad as Student
- Henry Brown as Student
- Frank Alesia as Student

== Production ==
The movie was filmed on location at the main campus of the University of the Pacific (UOP) in Stockton, California. The student "extras" were actual members of the student body of the university at that time.

It was the first film Ann-Margret made in the US for a number of years.

== Soundtrack ==
The soundtrack album for the movie was released in the US and Canada in 1970 on Bell Records (BELL 1203). The songs were written by Barry De Vorzon and Perry Botkin, Jr. except "We Don’t Know Where We’re Goin’", which they wrote with Melanie. Melanie sang two tracks on the album: "We Don’t Know Where We’re Goin’" and "Stop! I Don’t Wanna Hear It Any More", which was released as a single.
