= What Have They Done to My Song Ma =

1970 single by Melanie Safka

Single by Melanie

from the album Candles in the Rain
- A-side: "Ruby Tuesday"
- Released: 1970
- Studio: Wessex, London
- Genre: Folk rock
- Length: 2:26
- Label: Buddah
- Songwriter: Melanie Safka
- Producer: Peter Schekeryk

"What Have They Done to My Song Ma" is a song written and performed by Melanie Safka.

It was released in 1970 as the B-side of Melanie's "Ruby Tuesday" single and included on the album Candles in the Rain. The single reached No.39 in the United Kingdom and peaked within the top 20 in Norway and the Wallonia region of Belgium.

Other artists have recorded it as "Look What They've Done to My Song Ma", after the song's first line, and this title also is used on Melanie's official YouTube page.

== Cover versions ==
The New Seekers released a cover as "Look What They've Done to My Song Ma," in 1970. The single peaked at No.14 in the US and No.44 in the UK in 1970.

Daliah Lavi recorded a successful German version in 1971 and Ray Charles released a cover (as "Look What They've Done to My Song, Ma") in 1972. It has also been tackled by many other artists, including Nina Simone and Billie Jo Spears. The New Seekers' version topped the New Zealand Singles Chart and reached the top 10 in Australia, Canada, and on the US Billboard Easy Listening chart.

Dalida recorded the song in French. Czechoslovak singer Helena Vondráčková did a rendition in 1971 as "Kam zmizel ten starý song" with Czech lyrics by Zdeněk Borovec. Jeanette did an English/French version in 1973. Yugoslav rock band Bajaga i Instruktori released a cover of it with lyrics in Serbian, called "Vidi šta sam ti uradio od pesme, mama", in 1985.

It was used in the 1970s as a commercial for Lifebuoy soap ("Look what they've done to my Lifebuoy"), and in the 1980s as a commercial jingle for Ramada Inn (as "Look what they've done to Ramada") and for Oatmeal Crisp cereal ("Look what they've done to my oatmeal"). In October 2012, Miley Cyrus released a video of her own acoustic version of the song as part of her Backyard Sessions series. In 2015, Melanie joined her for a duet of this song and "Peace Will Come (According to Plan)". Another take on the song was done by Jack Wild; it appeared on his album Everything's Coming Up Roses, released in 1971. The song was played over the end credits of the 2026 film Digger. The song was covered by Rami Malek in the 2026 film The Man I Love.

== Charts ==
=== Melanie version ===
Chart (1970–1971)	Peak position
Belgium (Ultratop 50 Wallonia)	14
Norway (VG-lista)	6
UK Singles (Official Charts)	39

=== Dalida version ===
Chart (1970–1971)	Peak position
Belgium (Ultratop 50 Wallonia)	16

=== New Seekers version ===
==== Weekly charts ====
Chart (1970–1971)	Peak position
Australia (Kent Music Report)	3
Belgium (Ultratop 50 Flanders)	14
Belgium (Ultratop 50 Wallonia)	14
Canada Top Singles (RPM)	3
Canada Adult Contemporary (RPM)	13
New Zealand (Listener)	1
UK Singles (Official Charts)	44
US Billboard Hot 100	14
US Easy Listening (Billboard)	4

=== Ray Charles version ===
Chart (1972)	Peak position
US Billboard Hot 100	65
US Billboard R&B	25

==== Year-end charts ====
Chart (1970)	Position
Canada Top Singles (RPM)	47
US Billboard Hot 100	96
