= Brand New Key =

1971 single by Melanie

Single by Melanie

from the album Gather Me
- B-side: "Some Say (I Got Devil)"
- Released: October 1971
- Genre: Folk; pop; soft rock
- Length: 2:26
- Label: Neighborhood
- Songwriter: Melanie Safka
- Producer: Peter Schekeryk

Melanie singles chronology
"Ruby Tuesday" (1970)	"Brand New Key" (1971)	"The Nickel Song" (1972)

Official audio
- "Brand New Key" on YouTube

"Brand New Key" is a pop song written and sung by the American folk music singer Melanie. Initially a track of Melanie's album Gather Me, produced by Melanie's husband Peter Schekeryk, it was known also as "The Rollerskate Song" due to its chorus. It was her greatest success, scoring No. 1 on the Billboard Hot 100 singles chart during December 1971 and January 1972. Billboard ranked it as the No. 9 song of 1972. It also scored No. 1 in Canada and Australia and No. 4 on the UK Singles Chart.

== Overview ==
The song is sung from the viewpoint of a girl with roller skates trying to attract the attention of a boy.

In an interview with Examiner.com, Melanie described the inspiration for the song:

I was fasting with a 27-day fast on water. I broke the fast and went back to my life living in New Jersey and we were going to a flea market around six in the morning. On the way back… and I had just broken the fast, from the flea market, we passed a McDonald's and the aroma hit me, and I had been a vegetarian before the fast. So we pulled into the McDonald's and I got the whole works... the burger, the shake, and the fries... and no sooner after I finished that last bite of my burger… that song was in my head. The aroma brought back memories of roller skating and learning to ride a bike and the vision of my dad holding the back fender of the tire. And me saying to my dad... "You're holding, you're holding, you're holding, right?" Then I'd look back and he wasn't holding and I'd fall. So that whole thing came back to me and came out in this song.

The song has been described as folk music, pop music, and soft rock. It was arranged by Roger Kellaway.

== Possible sexual innuendo ==
Melanie has acknowledged the possibility of detecting sexual innuendo in the lyrics, but has denied any deeper meaning:

[The song], "Brand New Key", I wrote in about fifteen minutes one night. I thought it was cute; a kind of old thirties tune. I guess a key and a lock have always been Freudian symbols, and pretty obvious ones at that. There was no deep serious expression behind the song, but people read things into it. They made up incredible stories as to what the lyrics said and what the song meant. In some places, it was even banned from the radio. My idea about songs is that once you write them, you have very little say in their life afterward. It's a lot like having a baby. You conceive a song, deliver it, and then give it as good a start as you can. After that, it's on its own. People will take it any way they want to take it.

== Charts ==
=== Weekly charts ===
Chart (1971–1972)	Peak position
Australia (Kent Music Report)	1
Canada Top Singles (RPM)	1
Ireland (IRMA)	8
Dutch Top 40	9
New Zealand (Listener)	1
Quebec (ADISQ)	6
Singapore Charts	10
South Africa	1
UK Singles Chart	4
US Billboard Hot 100	1
US Billboard Adult Contemporary	5
US Cash Box Top 100	1
Zimbabwe (ZIMA)	1

=== Year-end charts ===
Chart (1972)	Rank
Australia	11
Canada (1971)	83
South Africa	6
UK	46
US Billboard Hot 100	9
US Cash Box Top 100	3

=== All-time charts ===
Chart (1958–2018)	Position
US Billboard Hot 100	394

== Certifications ==
Region	Certification	Certified units/sales
United States (RIAA)	Gold	1,000,000^{^}
^{^} Shipments figures based on certification alone.

== Cover versions ==
Country singer Deana Carter covered the song on her 1999 top-10 album Everything's Gonna Be Alright. The cellist band Rasputina had a version on the album Thanks for the Ether. Todd Rundgren played a cover on his 2018 tour. On August 1, 2018, at Daryl's House Club in Pawling, New York, Melanie joined Rundgren onstage to sing "Brand New Key".

A female-fronted punk trio, the Dollyrots, included a version on their album Because I'm Awesome. The 2006 American Idol runner-up, Katharine McPhee, covered the song as the bonus track on her 2010 Unbroken album. Olivia Newton-John covered the song on the soundtrack album for the film A Few Best Men in 2012. Jessica Frech covered the song on her 2012 Reality album. The New York-based singer Jaymay covered the song in 2013. Ray Conniff & The Singers did a cover version on their album I'd Like To Teach The World (In Perfect Harmony) album in 1971. Maddie Poppe covered it in the top-24 stage of American Idol season 16 on ABC and later went on to win. The Wiggles covered it on their 2022 album Rewiggled.

== Parodies ==
A version of the song entitled "The Combine Harvester", with new rustic-themed lyrics by Irish songwriter Brendan O'Shaughnessy (including "I've got a brand new combine harvester An' I'll give you the key"), was recorded by Irish comedian Brendan Grace, reaching No. 1 on the Irish Charts during 1975. In 1976 the same parody was covered in the UK by Scrumpy and Western band the Wurzels, reaching number one on the UK Singles Chart for two weeks in June.

A version of the song entitled "Kinky Boots", with lyrics themed around the Troubles in Ireland (including "We are the British Army and we're here to take your land") by the band The Irish Brigade was released on their 2000 album "Pardon Me for Smiling".

== References in popular culture ==
=== Movies ===
Melanie's version is heard in the 1997 film Boogie Nights as Dirk Diggler (Mark Wahlberg) has his "audition" with Rollergirl (Heather Graham) in front of Jack Horner (Burt Reynolds). It can also be heard in Jackass 3D during the "Bungee Boogie" skit, in which the cast members try launching themselves with a bungee cord into an inflatable swimming pool.

=== TV shows ===
On April 4, 2016, Jimmy Fallon lip synced the song during a "Lip Sync Battle" on The Tonight Show Starring Jimmy Fallon, while he competed with actress Melissa McCarthy.

During the 16th season of American Idol, contestant Maddie Poppe performed the song during the Top 24 elimination round.

The song is played during the "Apocalypse DJ" running sketch portion of the third episode of the 2022 The Kids in the Hall revival series. The sketches depict a radio DJ (played by Dave Foley) playing the song over and over again in the aftermath of an apocalypse caused by a "DNA Bomb".

The song is also heard in Family Guy season 20, episode 18, "Girlfriend, Eh?".

The song can be heard playing multiple times in the HBO Max series Lanterns in the first episode of season 1.
