= Neighborhood Records =

- Founded: 1971
- Founder: Melanie Safka & Peter Schekeryk

Neighborhood Records (Neighborhood Music Pub. Corp.) was a record label founded by Melanie Safka and her husband Peter Schekeryk in 1971. The label's biggest hit was her #1 single "Brand New Key".

First distributed by the Famous Music group of record labels (i.e. Dot, Blue Thumb and Paramount), it shifted distribution to Bell/Arista before folding in 1975.

There is also an independent record label by the same name that was founded by M.A. Sotelo in 2006. Its recordings were first distributed by Scrub Records and distribution later shifted to Kunaki, LLC.

== See also ==
- List of record labels
