= Melanie (singer) =

American musician (1947–2024)

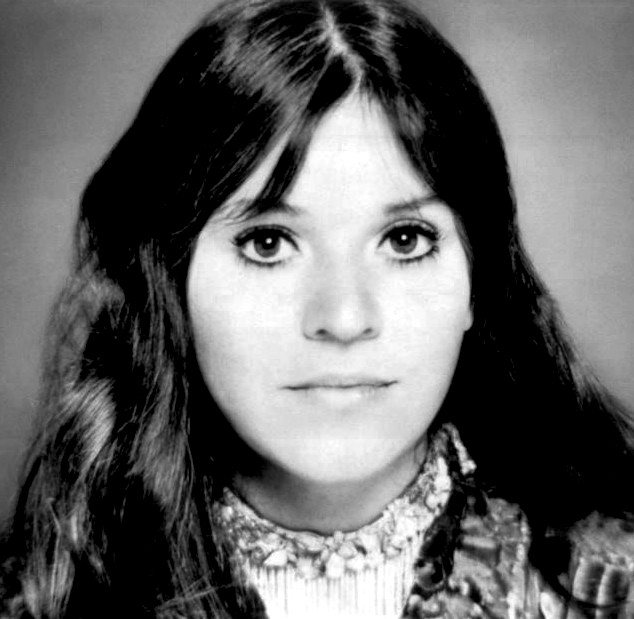
- Melanie in 1975

Background information
- Born: Melanie Anne Safka; February 3, 1947; Queens, New York City, U.S.
- Died: January 23, 2024 (aged 76) Nashville, Tennessee, U.S.
- Genres: Folk; pop; country
- Occupations: Singer; songwriter; musician
- Instruments: Vocals; acoustic guitar
- Years active: 1960s–2024
- Labels: Buddah; Neighborhood; Atlantic
- Website: melaniesafkamusic.com

Melanie Anne Safka-Schekeryk (February 3, 1947 – January 23, 2024), professionally known as Melanie or Melanie Safka, was an American singer-songwriter and guitarist.

Melanie is widely known for the 1971–72 global hit "Brand New Key", her 1970 version of the Rolling Stones' "Ruby Tuesday", her composition "What Have They Done to My Song Ma", and her 1970 international breakthrough hit, "Lay Down (Candles in the Rain)", which was inspired by her experience of performing at the 1969 Woodstock music festival.

== Early life ==
Melanie Anne Safka was born on February 3, 1947, in the Astoria neighborhood of Queens, New York City. Her father, Frederick M. Safka, was of Ukrainian ancestry, and her mother, Pauline "Polly" Altomare, was a jazz singer of Italian heritage. She had one younger sister, Stephanie. Melanie made her first public singing appearance at age four on the radio show Live Like A Millionaire, performing the song "Gimme a Little Kiss".

After her parents' divorce when she was five, she was raised by her mother in the Astoria and Bayside neighborhoods of Queens in New York City and then in Long Branch, New Jersey, where she first attended Long Branch High School. Disturbed that she was rejected by her schoolmates as a "beatnik", she ran away to California. After her return to New Jersey, she transferred to Red Bank High School in Red Bank, New Jersey. She graduated in 1964, although she was prevented from attending her graduation ceremony because of an overdue library book. She was inducted into the school's hall of fame in 2014.

== Career ==
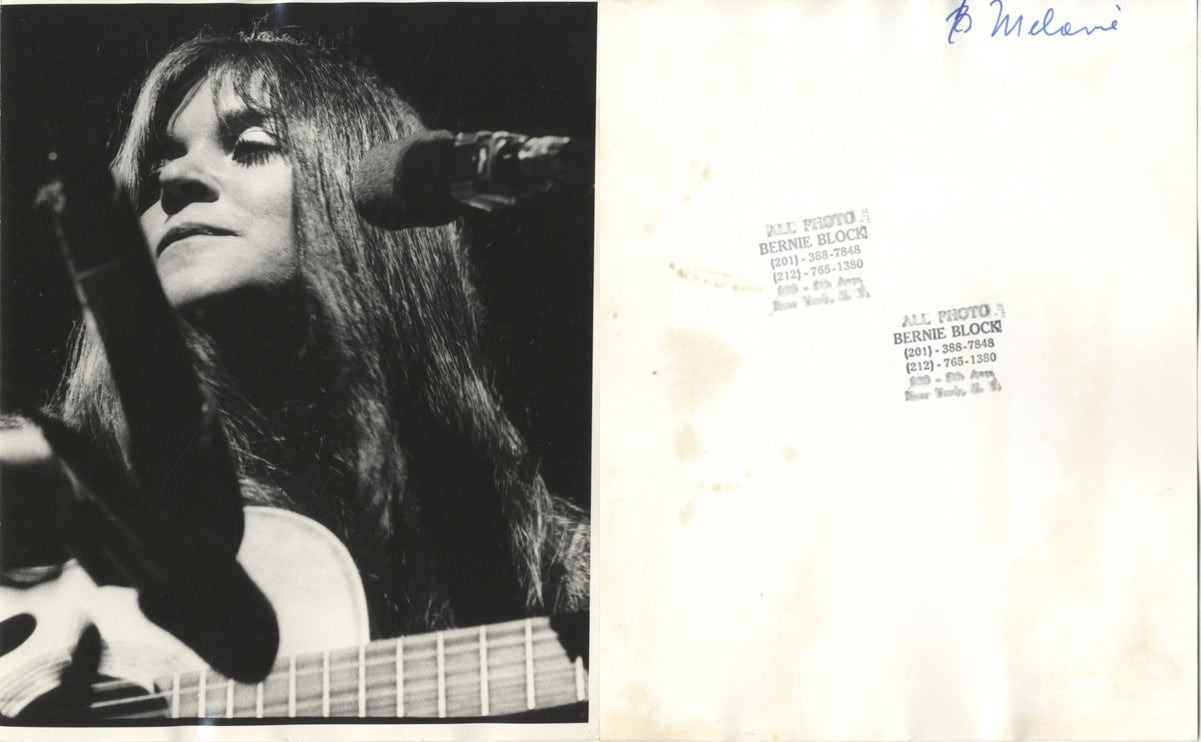
Melanie performing in 1971

In the 1960s, Melanie started performing at The Inkwell, a coffee house in the West End section of Long Branch. After high school, her parents insisted that she attend college, so she studied acting at the American Academy of Dramatic Arts in New York. She began singing in the folk clubs of Greenwich Village, such as The Bitter End, and signed her first recording contract with Columbia Records. Melanie released two singles on the label in the U.S. She subsequently signed with Buddah Records and found her first chart success in Europe in 1969 with "Bobo's Party", which reached No. 1 in France. Her popularity in Europe resulted in performances on European television programs such as Beat-Club in West Germany and BBC in Concert in the UK. Her debut album received positive reviews from Billboard, which described her voice as "wise beyond her years" and said her "non-conformist approach to the selections on this LP make her a new talent to be reckoned with".

Later in 1969, Melanie had a hit in the Netherlands with "Beautiful People". She was one of only three solo female artists who performed at the Woodstock festival in 1969, and her first hit song, "Lay Down (Candles in the Rain)", was inspired by the Woodstock audience lighting candles during her set as well as being influenced by her following of Indian spiritual master Meher Baba. The record became a hit in Europe, Australia, Canada, and the United States in 1970. The B-side of the single featured Melanie's spoken-word track "Candles in the Rain". Her first top 10 hit in America was "Lay Down", which peaked at No. 6 on the Billboard singles chart and achieved worldwide success. Her later hits included "Peace Will Come (According To Plan)" and a cover of the Rolling Stones' "Ruby Tuesday".

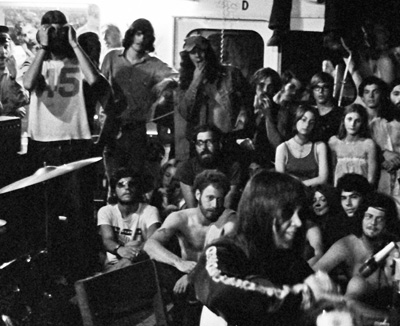
Melanie on the "Mr Softee" free stage, August 1, 1970

In 1970, Melanie was the only artist to ignore a court injunction banning the Powder Ridge Rock Festival, which was scheduled to be held on July 31, August 1 and 2, 1970. She played for the crowd on a homemade stage powered by Mister Softee trucks. Not long after this performance, she played at the Strawberry Fields Festival held from August 7 to 9, 1970, at Mosport Park in Ontario, Canada. She also performed at the Isle of Wight Festival, held between August 26 and 30, 1970, at Afton Down. At the festival, she was introduced by Keith Moon and received four standing ovations. She appeared again at the Isle of Wight Festival in 2010. In June 1971, she was the artist who sang to herald in the summer solstice at Glastonbury Fayre (later the Glastonbury Festival) in England. She performed again at Glastonbury in 2011, the 40th anniversary of the original festival.

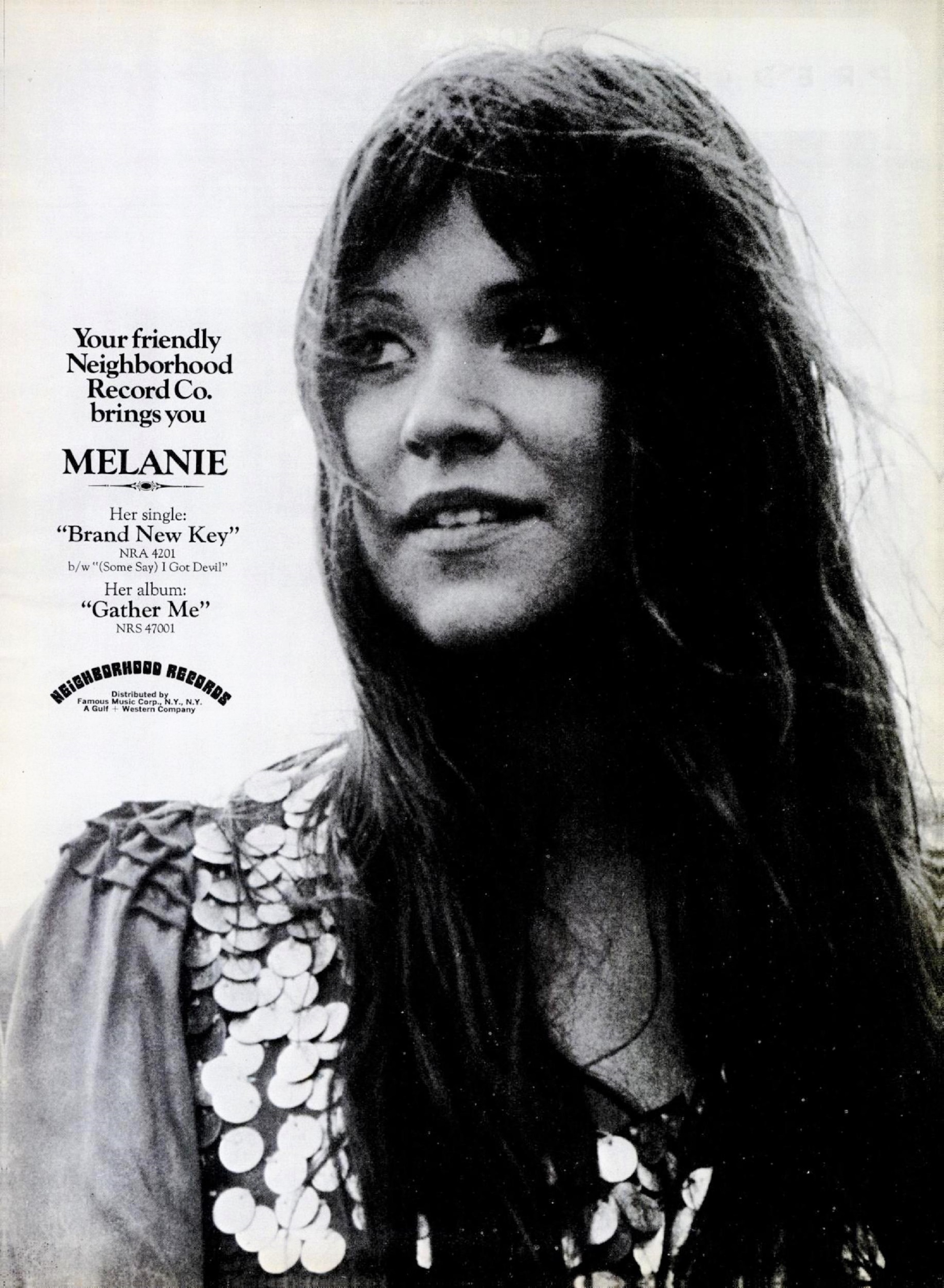
Billboard advertisement, October 23, 1971

Melanie left Buddah Records when they insisted that she produce albums on demand. In 1971, she formed her own label, Neighborhood Records, with Peter Schekeryk, who was also her producer and husband. She had her biggest American hit on the Neighborhood label, the novelty-sounding late 1971 No. 1 hit "Brand New Key" (often referred to as "The Roller Skate Song"). "Brand New Key" sold over three million copies worldwide and was featured in the 1997 movie Boogie Nights.

When first released, "Brand New Key" was banned by some radio stations because some inferred sexual innuendo in the lyrics. Melanie acknowledged the possibility of reading an unintended sexual innuendo in the song, stating:

I wrote ['Brand New Key'] in about fifteen minutes one night. I thought it was cute; a kind of old thirties tune. I guess a key and a lock have always been Freudian symbols, and pretty obvious ones at that. There was no deep serious expression behind the song, but people read things into it. They made up incredible stories as to what the lyrics said and what the song meant. In some places, it was even banned from the radio ... My idea about songs is that once you write them, you have very little say in their life afterward ... People will take it any way they want to take it.

In a 2013 interview with music journalist Ray Shasho, Melanie elaborated on the origin of "Brand New Key":

Of course I can see it symbolically with the key, but I just thought of roller skating. I was fasting with a twenty seven day fast on water. I broke the fast and went back to my life living in New Jersey and we were going to a flea market around six in the morning. On the way back ... and I had just broken the fast, from the flea market, we passed a McDonald's and the aroma hit me, and I had been a vegetarian before the fast. So we pulled into the McDonald's and I got the whole works ... the burger, the shake and the fries ... and no sooner after I finished that last bite of my burger ... that song was in my head. The aroma brought back memories of roller skating and learning to ride a bike and the vision of my dad holding the back fender of the tire. And me saying to my dad ... "You're holding, you're holding, you're holding, right?" Then I'd look back and he wasn't holding and I'd fall. So that whole thing came back to me and came out in this song. So it was not a deliberate or intentional sexual innuendo.

The follow-up single to "Brand New Key" was "Ring the Living Bell". To compete with this release, Melanie's former record company released "The Nickel Song", which she had recorded while still signed to Buddah Records. Both songs were simultaneous top 40 hits while "Brand New Key" was still on the charts, setting a record for the first female performer to have three top 40 hits at the same time.

Melanie won Billboard's No. 1 Top Female Vocalist award for 1972 and was awarded two gold albums and a gold single for "Brand New Key". Three of her compositions were hits for the New Seekers. She is also known for her musical adaptations of children's songs, including "Alexander Beetle" and "Christopher Robin". When she became an official UNICEF ambassador in 1972, she agreed to forgo a world tour in favor of raising money for the organization. She also took time to raise her daughter.

Melanie had another top 40 hit single in 1973 with "Bitter Bad", a song that marked a slight departure from the hippie sentiments of her earlier hits, with lyrics such as "If you do me wrong I'll put your first and last name in my rock n' roll song". Melanie's other chart hits during this period were the self-penned "Together Alone" and a cover of "Will You Love Me Tomorrow", which reached No 37 in the UK Singles Chart in March 1974.

=== Later career ===
In 1976, Melanie released one album on Atlantic Records, Photograph, which was produced by Ahmet Ertegun. The album was praised by The New York Times as one of the year's best, although it was largely ignored by the public. It was re-issued on compact disc in 2005 with an additional disc of unreleased material. Also in 1976, Melanie appeared at the tribute concert for Phil Ochs, who had died by suicide on April 9 that year. Held on May 28 at New York City's Felt Forum, Melanie performed an emotional version of Ochs's songs "Chords of Fame" and "Miranda". She had appeared with Ochs on stage in 1974 at his "Evening with Salvador Allende" concert (also held at the Felt Forum), along with Dave Van Ronk, Arlo Guthrie, Bob Dylan, and others.

In 1983, Melanie wrote the music and lyrics for a theatrical musical, Ace of Diamonds, with a book by Ed Kelleher and Seymour Vall based on a series of letters written by Annie Oakley. Though never fully produced, several staged readings were performed at Lincoln Center, with Melanie as the narrator and pop singer and actress Annie Golden as Oakley.

Melanie won an Emmy Award for writing the lyrics to the theme song for the television series Beauty and the Beast. With one exception, her albums were produced by her husband, Peter Schekeryk, who died suddenly in 2010. Her three children — Leilah, Jeordie, and Beau-Jarred — are also musicians. Beau-Jarred is a guitarist and accompanied his mother on tour.

One of Melanie's later albums, Paled By Dimmer Light (2004), was co-produced by Peter and Beau-Jarred Schekeryk and includes the songs "To Be The One", "Extraordinary", "Make It Work", and "I Tried To Die Young".

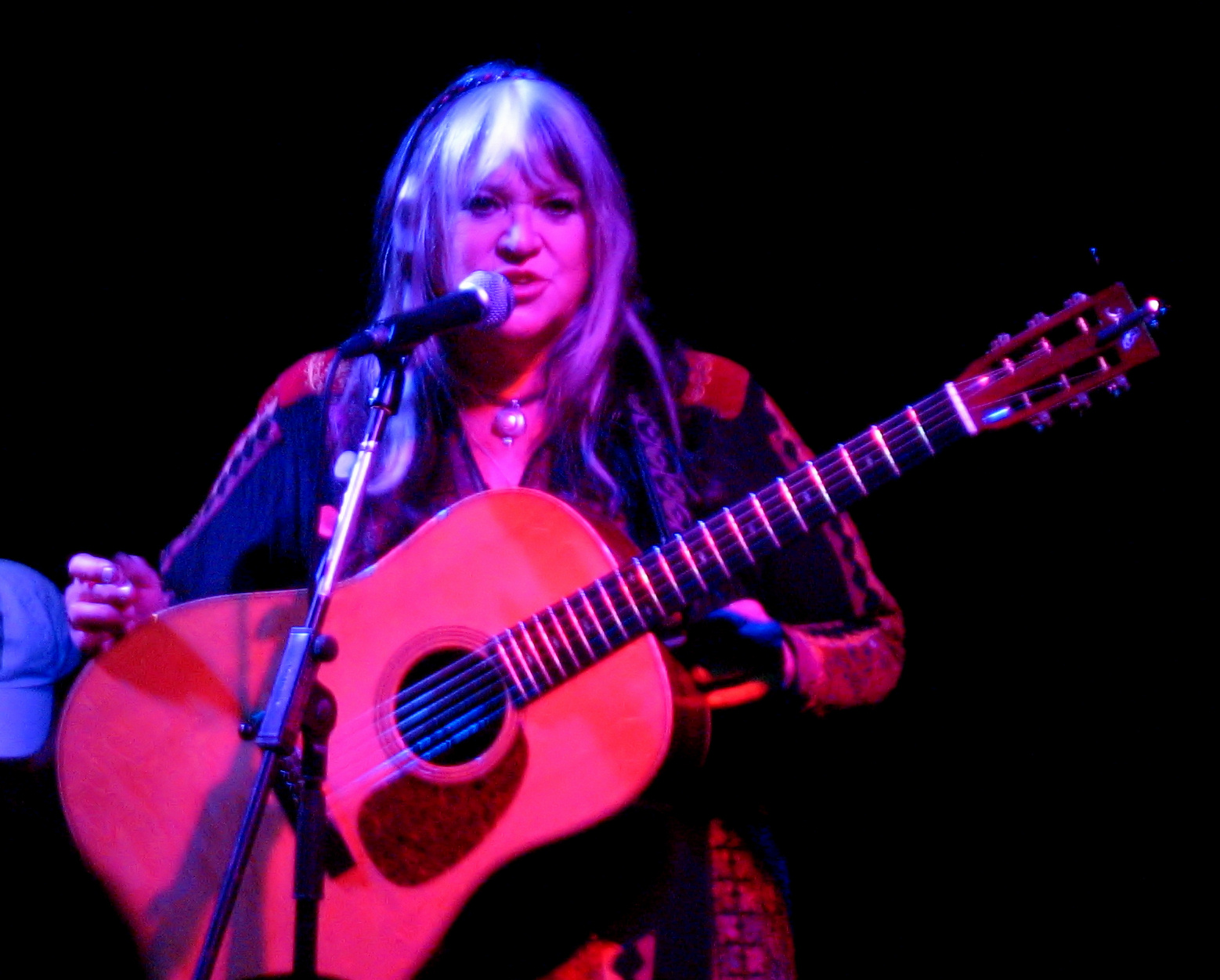
Melanie performing in 2009

In 2007, Melanie was invited by Jarvis Cocker to perform at the Meltdown festival at the Royal Festival Hall in London. Her sold-out performance was critically acclaimed, with The Independent saying, "It was hard to disagree that Melanie has earned her place alongside Joan Baez, Judy Collins, Buffy Sainte-Marie, Laura Nyro, Joni Mitchell, Nico, and Marianne Faithfull in the pantheon of iconic female singers. Meltdown was all the better for her presence." The concert was filmed for a DVD, Melanie: For One Night Only, which was released in October 2007. She recorded "Psychotherapy", sung to the tune of the "Battle Hymn of the Republic", which parodied aspects of Freudian psychoanalysis. The song has been played on The Dr. Demento Show. In July 2012, Melanie headlined along with Arlo Guthrie and Judy Collins at the 15th annual Woody Guthrie Folk Festival, which is held to celebrate Woody Guthrie's life and music.

In October 2012, Melanie collaborated with John Haldoupis, artistic and managing director of Blackfriars Theatre in Rochester, New York, to create an original musical about her love story with her late husband. Melanie and the Record Man made its premiere on October 19, with performances scheduled until October 28. The musical, conceived and designed by Haldoupis, featured Melanie's music and told the story of meeting Peter, falling in love, and working together to produce her music. Melanie performed during the musical and was also the narrator. In June 2014, she toured Australia for the first time since 1977.

In April 2015, Melanie was inducted into Red Bank Regional's "Distinguished Alumni Hall of Fame". In May 2015, she was invited by Miley Cyrus to collaborate with her for the Backyard Sessions, to help raise funds and awareness for Cyrus' Happy Hippie Foundation. On New Year's Eve 2019, she performed on the BBC's Jools' Annual Hootenanny.

At the time of her death in 2024, Melanie was working on a covers album titled Second Hand Smoke.

== Personal life and death ==
Melanie married her record producer Peter Schekeryk in 1968. They had three children: daughter Leilah born in 1973, daughter Jeordie in 1975, and son Beau-Jarred in 1980. Leilah and Jeordie, when aged seven and six, released a cover of "There's No One Quite Like Grandma" that charted in Canada, reaching No. 27. Melanie was a vegetarian in the early 1970s; she also practiced fasting.

Melanie identified herself politically as a libertarian, stating, "I am not a Democrat, a Socialist, or a Republican." She said that she had experienced acceptance from a "universal force of motherhood" after receiving a hug from Mata Amritanandamayi, a.k.a. Amma ("Mother") or the "hugging saint" from India, as she is also known, which had inspired her to write "Motherhood of Love".

Melanie resided in the Nashville metropolitan area. She died on January 23, 2024, at the age of 76. Her three children shared their mother's death in a Facebook post and her representatives mentioned "an illness", but no cause was given.

== Discography ==
Studio albums

- Born to Be (1968)
- Affectionately Melanie (1969)
- Candles in the Rain (1970)
- The Good Book (1971)
- Gather Me (1971)
- Garden in the City (1971)
- Stoneground Words (1972)
- The Best... (1972)
- Please Love Me (1973)
- Madrugada (1974)
- As I See It Now (1974)
- Sunset and Other Beginnings (1975)
- Photograph (1976)
- Phonogenic – Not Just Another Pretty Face (1978)
- Ballroom Streets (1978)
- Arabesque (1982)
- Seventh Wave (1983)
- Am I Real or What (1985)
- Melanie (1987)
- Cowabonga – Never Turn Your Back on a Wave (1988)
- Silence Is King (1993)
- Silver Anniversary (1993)
- Old Bitch Warrior (1996)
- Lowcountry (1997)
- Antlers – A Christmas for True Believers (1997)
- Beautiful People (1999)
- Moments from My Life (2002)
- Victim of the Moon (2002)
- Paled by Dimmer Light (2004)
- Ever Since You Never Heard of Me (2010)
- The First Farewell Tour (2022)
- Songs She Sang At Woodstock (2026)

== Other credits ==
- Lyrics for the theme song of the Beauty and the Beast television series
- Recorded "I've Got New York" on the 6ths' Hyacinths and Thistles album, 2000

Melanie sang two tracks on the soundtrack of the 1970 film R.P.M.: "We Don’t Know Where We’re Goin’" and "Stop! I Don’t Wanna Hear It Any More", which was released as a single.
