= List of awards and nominations received by the All-American Rejects =

The All-American Rejects awards and nominations
Awards and nominations
Award	Wins	Nominations

Totals (Note: Certain award groups do not simply award one winner. They acknowledge several different recipients, have runners-up, and have third place. Since this is a specific recognition and is different from losing an award, runner-up mentions are considered wins in this award tally. For simplification and to avoid errors, each award in this list has been presumed to have had a prior nomination.)
- Wins: 4
- Nominations: 18

The All-American Rejects is an alternative rock band formed in Stillwater, Oklahoma. The All-American Rejects have been nominated for many awards, most frequently in the Teen Choice Awards. The band was awarded accolades such as "Best Group Video" at the MTV Music Video Awards for "Move Along", as well as the "Rising Star" award from the Oklahoma Music Hall of Fame, and was also inducted into the hall itself. The video for the band's 2017 single "Sweat" has received a nomination from the UK Music Video Awards.

== APRA Awards ==
The APRA Awards are a series of annual award ceremonies created by the Australasian Performing Right Association, since 1982.

Year	Nominee / work	Award	Result
2010	"Gives You Hell"	International Work of the Year	Nominated

== ASCAP Pop Music Awards ==
The ASCAP Pop Music Awards is an awards show that honors its top pop members. The All-American Rejects have received 1 award.

Year	Nominee / work	Award	Result
2007	The All-American Rejects	ASCAP Vanguard Award	Won

== Fuse Fangoria Chainsaw Awards ==
The Fuse Fangoria Chainsaw Awards was an awards show that aired on Fuse TV only in 2006. The All-American Rejects received 1 nomination.

Year	Nominee / work	Award	Result
2006	"Move Along"	Killer Video	Nominated

== MTV Video Music Awards ==
The MTV Video Music Awards were established in 1984 by MTV to celebrate the music videos of the year. The All-American Rejects have won 1 award from 3 nominations.

Year	Nominee / work	Award	Result
2003	"Swing Swing"	Best New Artist in a Video	Nominated
2006	"Move Along"	Best Group Video	Won
2006	"Move Along"	Best Editing in a Video	Nominated

== mtvU Woodie Awards ==
Year	Nominee / work	Award	Result	Ref.
2006	"Move Along"	Streaming Woodie	Nominated	

== MuchMusic Video Awards ==
The MuchMusic Video Awards are awarded annually presented by the Canadian music video channel MuchMusic. The All-American Rejects has received 1 nomination.

Year	Nominee / work	Award	Result
2006	"Dirty Little Secret"	Best International Group	Nominated

== Oklahoma Music Hall of Fame ==
The Oklahoma Music Hall of Fame, located in Muskogee, Oklahoma, honors Oklahoma musicians for their lifetime achievements in music. The All-American Rejects have received 1 award.

Year	Nominee / work	Award	Result
2008	The All-American Rejects	Rising Star	Won

== Teen Choice Awards ==
The Teen Choice Awards are held annually and presented by Fox Broadcasting Company. The All-American Rejects have received 6 nominations.

Year	Nominee / work	Award	Result
2006	The All-American Rejects	Choice Music: Rock Group	Nominated
2006	"Move Along"	Choice Music: Rock Track	Nominated
2007	The All-American Rejects	Choice Music: Rock Group	Nominated
2009	The All-American Rejects	Choice Music: Rock Group	Nominated
2009	"Gives You Hell"	Choice Music: Rock Track	Nominated
2009	When the World Comes Down	Choice Music: Group Album	Nominated

== UK Music Video Awards ==
Year	Nominee / work	Award	Result
2017	"Sweat"	Best Rock/Indie Video - International	Nominated
