= Tournado (The All-American Rejects album) =

Video by The All-American Rejects
- Released: July 17, 2007
- Recorded: December 16, 2006
- Venue: Roy Wilkins Auditorium (Saint Paul, Minnesota)
- Length: 70:00
- Label: Interscope
- Director: Jeff Richter
- Producer: Joseph Uliano; Neil Maiers

The All-American Rejects chronology
Live at the Wiltern LG DVD (2006)	Tournado (2007)	Schooled (2007)

Tournado is the third video release by American rock band The All-American Rejects. It was recorded at the Roy Wilkins Auditorium in Saint Paul, Minnesota on December 16, 2006 during the band's Tournado tour for their second studio album, Move Along, and was released July 17, 2007. It also includes a behind-the-scenes tour documentary.

== Concert setlist ==
No.	Title	Length
1.	"Intro"	1:34
2.	"Dirty Little Secret"	3:04
3.	"Top of the World"	3:45
4.	"Happy Endings"	4:33
5.	"Stab My Back"	3:13
6.	"Dance Inside"	4:04
7.	"Eyelash Wishes"	6:29
8.	"Swing, Swing"	4:26
9.	"Straightjacket Feeling"	4:10
10.	"Night Drive"	3:42
11.	"My Paper Heart"	6:25
12.	"I'm Waiting"	5:33
13.	"It Ends Tonight"	4:24
14.	"The Last Song"	6:09
15.	"Move Along"	4:29

== Special features ==
Special features on the DVD include a 90-minute Tournado concert/documentary film. Two sound mixes are available on the DVD, with 5.1 Dolby Digital Surround as well as a stereo mix. There is also a photo gallery of the tour on the DVD, with the album cut of the song "Dance Inside" from Move Along played during the span of photos.

== Chart history ==
Chart (2007)	Peak position
U.S. Billboard Top Music Video	7
U.S. Billboard Comprehensive Music Videos	7
