= Move Along (disambiguation) =

Move Along is an album by The All-American Rejects

Move Along may also refer to:

- Move Along, a 1926 short film starring Lloyd Hamilton that survives
- Move Along (The Grass Roots album), a 1972 album by The Grass Roots, or the title song
- "Move Along" (song), a song released in 2006 by The All-American Rejects
- "Move Along", a 2012 song by Lower Than Atlantis on their album Changing Tune
