= I Wanna (The All-American Rejects song) =

Single by the All-American Rejects

from the album When the World Comes Down
- Released: June 8, 2009
- Recorded: 2007
- Genre: Alternative rock; pop-punk; electronic rock
- Length: 3:28
- Label: DGC; Interscope
- Songwriters: Nick Wheeler; Tyson Ritter
- Producer: Eric Valentine

The All-American Rejects singles chronology
"The Wind Blows" (2009)	"I Wanna" (2009)	"Beekeeper's Daughter" (2012)

Alternate cover
- CD promo cover

Music video
- "I Wanna" on YouTube

"I Wanna" is a song by American rock band the All-American Rejects, released as the third and final single from their third studio album When the World Comes Down on June 8, 2009.

== Background ==
"I Wanna" was written by Nick Wheeler and Tyson Ritter in Florida, United States and was one of the first songs to be written and recorded for When the World Comes Down within a six-month time period both in the studio and the band's tour bus and was refined by Ritter numerous times before recording began.

In an interview with Take 40 Australia, Wheeler said "Tyson came up with the idea on the road while we were touring Move Along. Two years straight on the road, barely going home. And when all you see is planes, buses, cars, insides of venues, dressing rooms and hotels... it starts to feel like a prison. That's kinda what the song's about... you're locked away in this hole and all you wanna do is touch somebody."

== Reception ==
=== Critical reception ===
The song received mixed reviews from music critics. The Impressive Inklings praised the song as an album opener and praised Ritter's vocal work as "impressive", while Marshall Lately stated that the track is "a playful opener on the junior effort" and "is repetitive without being annoying, which is seldom found in pop ditties, [it] shows lyrically that they know where they came from, but also where they’re going."

Sputnikmusic were more negative, stating "'I Wanna' has enough cringe-inducing lyrics to fill a Mariah Carey song and Ritter’s delivery is bored, at best. It feels as though AAR is tired with this same old song-and-dance routine."

=== Chart performance ===
Worldwide, "I Wanna" achieved moderate success, peaking at #42 and #45 in Austria and Germany respectively and #84 in the United Kingdom. In Australia, the song became the All-American Rejects' second-highest charting single in that territory - following "Gives You Hell" - peaking at #15. It also charted in the country's year-end Top 100 Singles at #88.

In the United States, "I Wanna" charted at #32 on the Billboard Mainstream Top 40 and #23 on the Adult Top 40 charts respectively in late August 2009, it eventually reached #92 on the Hot 100 the following month.

== Music video ==
A music video for "I Wanna" was directed by Rich Lee and was shot in June 2009 and was released a month later in mid-July. It primarily features the band performing the song on the set of their I Wanna Rock Tour stage set-up with neon lights, while scenes of a couple listening to music and sitting in a car are overlapped through the video, leading to them performing sexual intercourse.

A second version, directed by Paul Hunter, was released October 13, 2009. It revolves around a house party with the band where lead singer and bassist Tyson Ritter encounters his ex-girlfriend (played by Julianna Guill) with a new boyfriend (played by Landon Ashworth). Throughout the video, a series of videos and transitions are shown on LG cell phones that show the video both through them and how Ritter and his girlfriend broke up. Towards the end, the All-American Rejects are seen performing in front of their party guests with Ritter and the ex-girlfriend crowd surfing towards each other in the audience and ultimately renewing their relationship when they reach each other.

== Appearances in popular culture ==
"I Wanna" is featured in the film The House Bunny, which also stars Ritter as the character of Colby.

== Track listing ==
Australia and United Kingdom CD single
No.	Title	Length
1.	"I Wanna"	3:28
2.	"I Wanna" (Mark Hoppus remix)	3:20

Austria and Germany CD single
No.	Title	Length
1.	"I Wanna"	3:29
2.	"Gives You Hell" (live from London)	3:32

CD promo
No.	Title	Length
1.	"I Wanna"	3:29

7" vinyl
No.	Title	Length
1.	"I Wanna" (side A)	3:29
2.	"I Wanna" (Discotech remix) (side B)	3:32

The Remixes EP
No.	Title	Length
1.	"I Wanna" (Discotech remix)	3:23
2.	"I Wanna" (Mark Hoppus remix)	3:20
3.	"I Wanna" (DJ Spider remix)	3:51
4.	"I Wanna" (Eli Escobar remix)	5:39

== Charts and certifications ==
=== Weekly charts ===
Chart (2009)	Peak position
Australia (ARIA)	15
Austria (Ö3 Austria Top 40)	42
Germany (GfK)	45
Scotland Singles (Official Charts)	50
UK Singles (Official Charts)	84
US Billboard Hot 100	92
US Adult Pop Airplay (Billboard)	23
US Pop Airplay (Billboard)	28

=== Year-end charts ===
Chart (2009)	Position
Australian Singles Chart	88

=== Certifications ===
Region	Certification	Certified units/sales
Australia (ARIA)	Gold	35,000^{^}
^{^} Shipments figures based on certification alone.

== Release history ==
Country	Date	Format	Label
Australia	June 8, 2009	CD single	Universal Music Group
United Kingdom	June 8, 2009	CD single; 7" vinyl	Polydor
United States	July 27, 2009	CD promo	DGC; Interscope
Canada	August 24, 2009	CD single	Interscope
Austria	August 21, 2009	CD single	Universal Music Group
Germany	August 21, 2009	CD single	Universal Music Group
Switzerland	August 21, 2009	CD single	Universal Music Group
United Kingdom	December 14, 2009	Digital download	Polydor
