= Mike Kennerty =

American musician and record producer (born 1980)

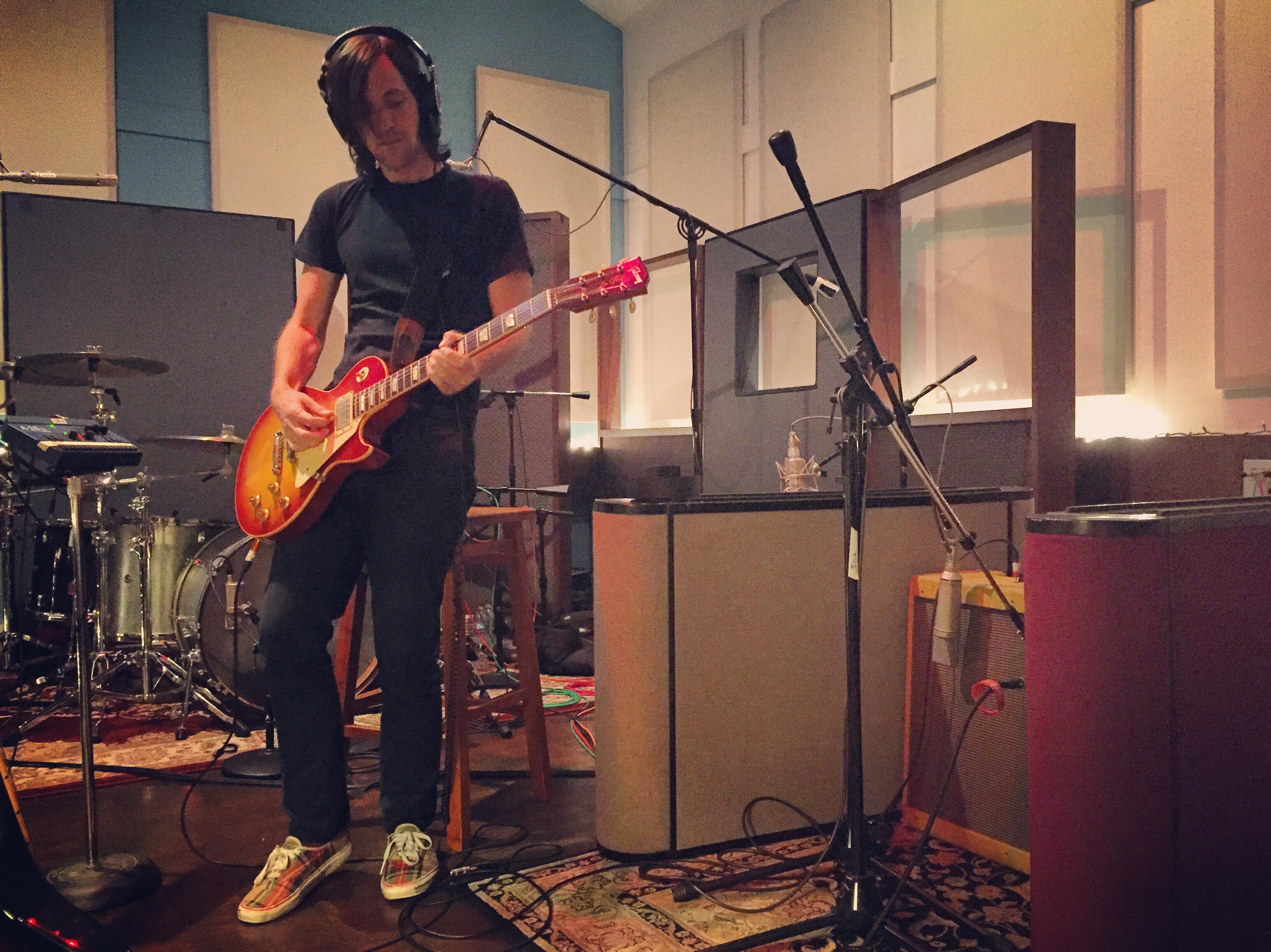
- Mike Kennerty recording with The All-American Rejects in 2016.

Background information
- Born: Michael Brian Kennerty; July 20, 1980 (age 45)
- Origin: Edmond, Oklahoma, U.S.
- Genres: Alternative rock; pop rock; pop-punk; punk rock
- Occupations: Musician; record producer
- Instruments: Guitar; bass guitar
- Years active: 1998–present

Michael Brian Kennerty (born July 20, 1980) is an American musician and record producer. He is best known as the rhythm guitarist for The All-American Rejects, as well as playing guitar for Screeching Weasel. As a producer he has worked with such artists as Masked Intruder, Direct Hit!, Screeching Weasel, The Copyrights, Red City Radio, and Geoff Palmer. He lives in Edmond, Oklahoma, where his studio is also located.

== Discography ==
=== Production ===
Year	Artist	Release	Format	Label	produce, engineer, mix
2007	Ben Weasel	These Ones Are Bitter	LP	Asian Man Records	p, e
2010	The City Lives	s/t	EP	Edmond Records	p, e, m
2011	Screeching Weasel	First World Manifesto	LP	Fat Wreck Chords	p, e
2011	They Stay Dead	s/t	EP	Death To False Hope	p, e
2011	Screeching Weasel	Carnival Of Schadenfreude	EP	Recess Records	p, e
2011	They Stay Dead	Cursed	EP	Death To False Hope	p, e
2013	Partners	Sixes	EP	self-released	p, e
2013	Direct Hit	Brainless God	LP	Red Scare Industries	p, e
2013	They Stay Dead	Bruise Banner	single	self-released	p, e
2014	The Copyrights	No Knocks	EP	Fat Wreck Chords	p, e
2014	The Copyrights	Report	LP	Red Scare Industries	p, e
2015	Screeching Weasel	Baby Fat Act 1	2XLP	Recess Records	p, e
2016	Direct Hit	Wasted Mind	LP	Fat Wreck Chords	p, e
2016	Masked Intruder	Love and Other Crimes	EP	Pure Noise Records	p, e
2017	The Connection	Just For Fun	LP	Ghost Highway Recordings	m
2017	Garrett Dale	Two T's EP	EP	Red Scare Industries	p, e, m
2017	Direct Hit / Pears	Human Movement	LP	Fat Wreck Chords	p, e
2018	Red City Radio	SkyTigers	EP	Red Scare Industries	p, e
2018	Direct Hit	Crown Of Nothing	LP	Fat Wreck Chords	p, e
2018	Russian Girlfriends / Redbush	split	EP	Orange Whip Records	e
2019	Masked Intruder	III	LP	Pure Noise Records	p, e
2019	Masked Intruder	Bad Reputation	single	Pure Noise Records	p, e
2019	Russian Girlfriends	In The Parlance of Our Times	LP	A-F Records	e
2019	Aggravated Nuisance	Deadly Forces	EP	self-released	p, e, m
2019	Mini Meltdowns	Destined For Disaster	EP	Good Land Records	p, e, m
2019	The Eradicator	Peak Eradicator	LP	Say-10	m
2020	Trial By Noise	Complete Starter Kit!	LP	Little Mafia Records	p, e, m
2020	Screeching Weasel	Some Freaks Of Atavism	LP	Monona Music	p, e, m
2020	They Stay Dead	Regression	EP	self-released	p, e, m
2020	Devon Kay & the Solutions	Limited Joy	LP	A-F Records	m
2020	Geoff Palmer & Lucy Ellis	Your Face Is Weird	EP	Stardumb Records	m
2020	Red City Radio	Paradise	LP	Pure Noise Records	p, e, m
2021	Geoff Palmer	Many More Drugs	EP	Stardumb Records	m
2021	Geoff Palmer	Charts & Graphs	LP	Stardumb Records	m
2022	Devon Kay & the Solutions	Grieving Expectation	LP	Pure Noise Records	m
2022	Red City Radio	Live at Gothic Theater	LP	Pure Noise Records	m
2022	Screeching Weasel	The Awful Disclosures of Screeching Weasel	LP	Striped Music	p, e, m
2022	Geoff Palmer	Standing in the Spotlight	LP	Stardumb Records	m
2022	A Vulture Wake	One.Kingdom.Animal	LP	Thousand Islands Records	p, e, m
2023	Screeching Weasel	Anthem For A New Tomorrow	LP	Recess Records / Striped Music	remix
2023	Geoff Palmer	An Otherwise Negative Situation	LP	Stardumb Records	m
2023	Brad Marino	Grin & Bear It	LP	Sioux	m
2023	Screeching Weasel	How To Make Enemies and Irritate People	LP	Recess Records / Striped Music	remix
2024	Neil Rubenstein	Have Some Dignity	LP	Equal Vision	m, master
2025	Screeching Weasel	My Brain Hurts	LP	Recess Records	remix
2025	Geoff Palmer	Kodak Flash	EP	Stardumb Records	p, e, m

=== Performer ===
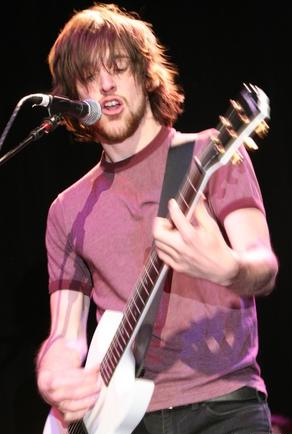
Kennerty in 2006

==== with The All-American Rejects ====
- Move Along (2005, Interscope)
- When the World Comes Down (2008, Interscope)
- Kids in the Street (2012, Interscope)
- Sweat (2017, Interscope)
- Send Her To Heaven (2019, Epitaph)

==== with Screeching Weasel ====
- Baby Fat Act 1 (2015, Recess Records)
- The Awful Disclosures of Screeching Weasel (Monona Music, 2022)

==== Other ====
- Ben Weasel - These Ones Are Bitter (2007, Asian Man Records)
- These Enzymes - Henry (2004, Doghouse Records)
- Euclid Crash - FMO (2002)
- Mr. Crispy - Hopes and Schemes (2000, Mutant Pop Records)
- Mr. Crispy - End of the Week (1999)
- Mr. Crispy / Peter the Great split (1998)
- Mr. Crispy - Drug Free and Regretting It (1998)

He also often does additional performance on the records he produces.
