= When the World Comes Down =

Studio album by the All-American Rejects
- Released: December 16, 2008
- Recorded: 2007–2008
- Studios: Barefoot, Los Angeles, California; Skywalker Ranch, San Rafael, California; Avatar Events Group, Atlanta, Georgia; Nick Wheeler's house; Tyson Ritter's house, Florida
- Genres: Alternative rock; pop-punk; power pop
- Length: 45:35
- Labels: DGC; Doghouse; Interscope
- Producer: Eric Valentine

The All-American Rejects chronology
Move Along (2005)	When the World Comes Down (2008)	Kids in the Street (2012)

Singles from When the World Comes Down
- 1. "Gives You Hell" Released: September 30, 2008; 2. "The Wind Blows" Released: April 21, 2009; 3. "I Wanna" Released: June 8, 2009

When the World Comes Down is the third studio album by American rock band the All-American Rejects, released on December 16, 2008, by Interscope Records. Following on from touring and promoting for their previous album Move Along (2005), the band began writing for their follow-up in late 2006 with producer Eric Valentine. The album was recorded in 2008 at Barefoot Studios in Los Angeles, California.

== Production ==
The All-American Rejects began writing material for their third studio album in late December 2006 after wrapping up their Tournado tour, and continued through into the new year. But due to further touring and promotion for their second album Move Along, the band did not enter the studio until nearly a year later. This was also the first time lyricists Nick Wheeler and Tyson Ritter tried new methods of writing by "escaping" to various regional areas in North America to conceive new lyrics so that the songs could sound "honest".

The All-American Rejects began recording for When the World Comes Down at Skywalker Ranch in San Rafael, California with assistant engineer Dann Thompson, and later at Barefoot Studios in Los Angeles, California, with producer Eric Valentine. The sessions were overseen by studio manager Trevor Whatever; Matt Radosevich and Brad Cook served as assistant engineers. The band rented additional instruments from Hollywood Studio Rentals, and other equipment from Stephen Jarvis Rentals. Additional vocals were recorded at Avatar Events Group in Atlanta, Georgia by Kenny Cresswell, and at Wheeler's and Ritter's houses in Florida.

An orchestra was recorded at Warner Brothers Studios in Burbank, California on the Eastwood Scoring Stage. The recordings were mixed by Valentine at Barefoot, and the Village in Santa Monica, California. Bernie Grundman mastered the album at Bernie Grundman Mastering in Hollywood, California. Despite the album being initially planned for release in mid-September 2008, recording was not completed until September 18.

== Composition ==
In an interview with She Knows Entertainment, Ritter commented "I think When the World Comes Down has been a journey. I was 23 when I started writing this record. I'm 24 now... people say when you graduate college you figure out who you are. If I had graduated college, this would be that moment – now. I think I was most questioning life when I was getting off the road with Move Along and this record was therapy for me. It's everything I needed it to be for me."

The first songs to be written that made it onto the album were "I Wanna", "Back to Me", and "Breakin'". While "I Wanna" was written over six months, with Ritter making constant refinements, the following songs "Gives You Hell" and "Another Heart Calls" were all written during a road trip to Vancouver, British Columbia, Canada, with "Fallin' Apart" and "Mona Lisa" getting scored in Rabun County, Georgia, the latter of which was recorded live in one take. The album was later named When the World Comes Down as Ritter saw the title track as "a perfect, simple work of art".

== Release ==
During production of the album, The All-American Rejects broadcast live to fans online to provide a direct insight into the "record-making" process. They later released the demo version of the track "Mona Lisa (When the World Come Down)" and "Sierra's Song" as free downloads, the latter of which never featured on the album and appears on the soundtrack to the American television show 90210.

In April 2008, the band appeared at the Bamboozle Left festival. In June, the band performed on the 2008 edition of Warped Tour. On June 30, 2008, the band announced that their next album would be released in three months' time. In August and September, the band embarked on a Canadian tour with Simple Plan and Faber Drive. On September 18, the day that recording for the album was completed, the album's release was changed from mid-September to November 18. On September 22, "Gives You Hell" was made available for streaming through imeem. It was released as the album's lead single on September 30. On October 11, it was announced that the album's release date had again been pushed back, this time to mid-December. In October and November 2008, the band went on a US tour, which included an appearance on Late Night with Conan O'Brien. A music video for "Gives You Hell" followed on November 6, 2008, with an alternative version premiering in January 2009. "Mona Lisa" was released November 18, 2008 along with its music video as a promotional single prior to the album's release. When the World Comes Down was made available for streaming through Myspace on December 15, 2008, before being released a day later. Upon When the World Comes Down's release, ten percent of profits made from the album's sales were donated to the charity Feed the Children.

In April and May 2009, the band went on the I Wanna Rock tour in the US with Ace Enders and A Million Different People. Shiny Toy Guns, Vedera and the Upwelling each appeared on select dates. "The Wind Blows" was released as the album's second single on April 21 and was swiftly followed by the release of its music video on April 27, an alternative version was published the following October. A music video was released for "I Wanna" on June 2, 2009. Six days later, "I Wanna" was released as its third and final single. Throughout the month, the band performed a few shows in Europe with Sparks the Rescue. A second music video was released for "I Wanna" on October 14, 2009. For the rest of the month, the band went on a European tour with American Steel. "Real World" was later released as a second promotional single on July 8, 2009. In November and December, the band co-headlined a US tour with Taking Back Sunday, with support from Anberlin. In June and July 2010, the band performed on Warped Tour.

== Reception ==
Professional ratings
Aggregate scores
Source	Rating
Metacritic	64/100
Review scores
Source	Rating
AllMusic	2.5/5 stars
Alternative Press	4/5 stars
Consequence of Sound	F
Entertainment Weekly	B−
Los Angeles Times	2.5/4 stars
musicOMH	2/5 stars
PopMatters	6/10 stars
Rolling Stone	3/5 stars
Spin	(6/10)
USA Today	2.5/4 stars

=== Critical reception ===
When the World Comes Down divided music critics. The album has a score of 64 out of 100 from Metacritic based on "generally favorable reviews". The Boston Herald gave it a B− and stated, "there are tracks that showcase their amalgam of bubblegum-pop and hair metal, as well as their penchant for corn-fed power ballads. But the rest is a departure." Melodic gave it a score of four stars out of five and said, "You could fool anyone with this being a Greatest Hits collection because the new songs are that good!" The Boston Globe gave it a favorable review and said that the album "will only cement the band's top-of-the-heap status." RedRecords gave it a score of 90% and said it "isn’t an amazing album based on how far and deep the band goes into perfecting their genre, it is an amazing album because it sounds great and diverse. There are no boring tracks (though there are some filler tracks, even they’re listenable) and there isn’t a dictating genre to keep everything in line. The lyrics are okay, nothing poor but nothing great, and the production is incredible." Rock Sound gave it a score of seven out of ten and called it "A-class power-pop of the standard so many other bands reach for but can never attain."

The New York Times gave it a positive review and called it "completely clear and even traditional pop music, but those over 16 will likely have no use for it." Billboard gave it an average review and said that the album "doesn't evince much growth, proffering more of the same hooky pop/rock centered around adolescent love and heartache." However, Blender gave it two-and-a-half stars out of five and said, "Anything involving a string section is disastrous, but a couple of choruses are suitable for both raucous fist-pumping and rampant pouting."

=== Chart performance ===
Upon the week of its release, When the World Comes Down sold 112,000 copies and charted at #15 on the U.S. Billboard 200 and the top ten on the Top Alternative, Top Digital and Top Rock Albums charts respectively and by January 7, 2009, sold 76,923 more copies. As of June 2009, the album has sold 422,000 copies. It was certified platinum by the Recording Industry Association of America, denoting 1,000,000 shipments. "Gives You Hell" was met with critical and commercial success, reaching #4 on the Billboard Hot 100 and topping the Adult Top 40 and Mainstream Top 40 charts in the United States. "I Wanna" charted at #15 on the Australian Singles chart and reaching the top 30 on the Billboard Mainstream Top 40 and Adult Top 40 charts in the U.S.

== Track listing ==
All songs written by the All-American Rejects.

No.	Title	Length
1.	"I Wanna"	3:29
2.	"Fallin' Apart"	3:27
3.	"Damn Girl"	3:52
4.	"Gives You Hell"	3:33
5.	"Mona Lisa (When the World Comes Down)"	3:15
6.	"Breakin'"	3:59
7.	"Another Heart Calls" (featuring The Pierces)	4:08
8.	"Real World"	4:03
9.	"Back to Me"	4:29
10.	"Believe"	3:28
11.	"The Wind Blows"	4:22
12.	"Sunshine" (hidden track)	3:00

SlotMusic bonus track
No.	Title	Length
13.	"Alone Again" ("The Wind Blows" demo)	4:00

US iTunes Store and international deluxe edition bonus tracks
No.	Title	Length
13.	"I Wanna" (demo)	3:18
14.	"Damn Girl" (demo)	3:37
15.	"Fallin' Apart" (demo)	3:34
16.	"Mona Lisa" (demo)	2:44
17.	"Real World" (demo)	3:55
18.	"On the Floor" (demo)	2:53
19.	"Here I Sit" (demo - iTunes pre-order)	3:59

UK bonus track
No.	Title	Length
20.	"The Wind Blows" (Steve Aoki "Hurricane" remix)	4:21

Japanese bonus tracks
No.	Title	Length
18.	"Here I Sit" (demo)	3:59
19.	"The Wind Blows" (Steve Aoki "Hurricane" remix)	4:22
20.	"Another Heart Calls" (featuring Hiroko of Mihimaru GT)	4:09

Australian bonus tracks (Disc 2)
No.	Title	Length
1.	"Gives You Hell" (live at Acoustic Yahoo!)
2.	"Mona Lisa" (live at Rhapsody Original)
3.	"I Wanna" (live at Rhapsody Original)
4.	"It Ends Tonight" (acoustic)
5.	"Move Along" (live from Tournado)

US deluxe edition bonus tracks (Disc 2)
No.	Title	Length
1.	"I Wanna" (demo)	3:19
2.	"Damn Girl" (demo)	3:38
3.	"Fallin' Apart" (demo)	3:35
4.	"Mona Lisa" (demo)	2:44
5.	"Real World" (demo)	3:55

Best Buy deluxe edition bonus tracks (Disc 2)
No.	Title	Length
6.	"Swing, Swing" (live)	6:59
7.	"I'm Waiting" (live)	5:38
8.	"Move Along" (live)	4:49

=== Notes ===
- Thirty seconds of silence is featured between tracks 11 and 12 on the CD release of the album.
- Bonus Computer Content on all CD Deluxe Editions and the UK album (which is essentially a deluxe version) includes the videos "Track by Track with Tyson and Nick", the "Mona Lisa" music video, the "Gives You Hell" MTV edit music video, and "The Making of Gives You Hell". The former two videos can be downloaded onto the computer from the website, as well as from the iTunes Deluxe Edition. Lastly, the Bonus Computer Content website features a small picture gallery with pictures that can be set as wallpapers on the computer.

== Personnel ==
Personnel per booklet.

The All-American Rejects

- Tyson Ritter – lead vocals, bass, bowed vibes (track 1), recorder (track 2), synthesizer (track 3 and 5), gang vocals (track 4), marxophone (track 7) pedal steel (tracks 7 and 11), vibraphone (track 8) broomstick (track 11)
- Nick Wheeler – guitars, gang vocals (track 4), orchestration (track 8), programming, drum corp (track 8), autoharp (track 12)
- Mike Kennerty – guitars, gang vocals (track 4), Hammond bass pedals (track 5), autoharp (track 11)
- Chris Gaylor – drums, gang vocals (track 4), drum corp (track 8)

Additional musicians

- Kevin Saulnier – keyboards, piano
- Deborah Lurie – orchestra (tracks 7, 8 and 12)
- Eric Valentine – orchestra (track 8), programming, drum corp (track 8)
- Anton Patzner – violin (track 2)
- Zoe Ellis – angelic choir (tracks 2 and 8)
- Sunshine Becker – angelic choir (tracks 2 and 8)
- Caitlin Cornwell – angelic choir (tracks 2 and 8)
- Ashiling Cole – angelic choir (tracks 2 and 8)
- Jeff Sosnow – gang vocals (track 4)
- Trevor Whatever – gang vocals (track 4)
- Brad Cole – gang vocals (track 4)
- Lonn Friend – gang vocals (track 4)
- Seth Howard – gang vocals (track 4)
- Catherine Pierce – vocals (track 7)
- Allison Pierce – vocals (track 7)
- Lenny Castro – percussion

Production

- Eric Valentine – producer, engineer, mixing
- Trevor Whatever – session coordinator, studio manager
- Matt Radosevich – assistant engineer
- Brad Cook – assistant engineer
- Bernie Grundman – mastering

Design

- Ianthe Zevos – art director
- Graphictherapy – design
- Herb Williams – cover artist, art director
- Thomas Petillo – cover photography
- Jeff "Rhino" Neumann – back cover photo
- The All-American Rejects – inside photos

== Charts ==
=== Weekly charts ===
Weekly chart performance for When the World Comes Down
Chart (2008–2009)	Peak position
Australian Albums (ARIA)	35
Austrian Albums (Ö3 Austria)	39
French Albums (SNEP)	76
German Albums (Offizielle Top 100)	35
Irish Albums (IRMA)	81
Japanese Albums (Oricon)	100
New Zealand Albums (RMNZ)	19
Scottish Albums (Official Charts)	53
UK Albums (Official Charts)	48
US Billboard 200	15
US Top Alternative Albums (Billboard)	4
US Top Rock Albums (Billboard)	6

=== Year-end charts ===
Year-end chart performance for When the World Comes Down
Chart (2009)	Position
US Billboard 200	69
US Top Rock Albums (Billboard)	23

== Certifications ==
Certifications and sales for When the World Comes Down
Region	Certification	Certified units/sales
New Zealand (RMNZ)	Gold	7,500^{‡}
United Kingdom (BPI)	Silver	60,000^{‡}
United States (RIAA)	Platinum	1,000,000^{‡}
^{‡} Sales+streaming figures based on certification alone.

== Release history ==
Release dates and formats for When the World Comes Down
Country	Date	Format	Label
Canada	December 16, 2008	CD; digital download; LP	DGC; Interscope
United States	December 16, 2008	CD; digital download; LP	DGC; Interscope
Australia	January 10, 2009	CD; digital download	DGC; Interscope
New Zealand	January 10, 2009	CD; digital download	DGC; Interscope
Austria	February 5, 2009	CD; digital download	DGC; Interscope
Germany	February 5, 2009	CD; digital download	DGC; Interscope
United Kingdom	February 9, 2009	CD; digital download	Polydor
Europe	February 22, 2009	CD; digital download	DGC; Interscope
Japan	April 1, 2009	CD; digital download	DGC; Interscope
France	May 19, 2009	CD; digital download	DGC; Interscope
