= Sandbox (The All-American Rejects album) =

Studio album by The All-American Rejects
- Released: May 15, 2026
- Recorded: Wheelhouse; New Monkey
- Genre: Alternative rock; pop-punk
- Length: 41:36
- Label: Slick Shoes
- Producer: Scott Chesak; Tyson Ritter; Nick Wheeler

The All-American Rejects chronology
Kids in the Street (2012)	Sandbox (2026)

Singles from Sandbox
- 1. "Sandbox" Released: April 23, 2025; 2. "Easy Come, Easy Go" Released: June 5, 2025; 3. "Search Party!" Released: September 18, 2025; 4. "Eggshell Tap Dancer" Released: October 24, 2025; 5. "Get This" Released: November 28, 2025; 6. "King Kong" Released: April 1, 2026

Sandbox is the fifth studio album by American rock band The All-American Rejects. It was released independently on May 15, 2026, and marks the longest gap between the band's albums, fourteen years after Kids in the Street.

== Critical reception ==
Professional ratings
Review scores
Source	Rating
Distorted Sound Magazine	8/10
Hot Press	8/10
The Arts Desk	3/5 stars

Sandbox was met with generally favorable reviews from critics. At Album of the Year, which assigns a weighted average rating out of 100 to reviews from mainstream publications, this release received an average score of 73, based on 3 reviews.

== Track listing ==
All tracks are written by Tyson Ritter, except where noted.

No.	Title	Writer(s)	Length
1.	"Easy Come, Easy Go"	Tyson Ritter; Scott Chesak	2:34
2.	"Get This"		3:19
3.	"Search Party!"		4:22
4.	"Eggshell Tap Dancer"		3:47
5.	"Green Isn't Yellow"		2:59
6.	"Sandbox"		2:25
7.	"King Kong"		3:26
8.	"Clothesline"	Ritter; Chesak; Vincent John; Maxwell Perla	3:34
9.	"Lemonade"	Ritter; Chesak	2:54
10.	"For Mama"		4:41
11.	"Staring Back at Me"	Ritter; Chris Gaylor	3:30
12.	"Search Party! (Live from Medium Sized Backyard)"		4:15
Total length:			41:36

== Personnel ==
Credits are adapted from Tidal.

=== The All-American Rejects ===
- Tyson Ritter – lead vocals, production (all tracks); background vocals (tracks 2–12), guitar (2–5, 8, 11, 12), bass (2–4, 6–9, 11, 12), keyboards (2, 3, 7, 11, 12)
- Nick Wheeler – drums (2–4, 7, 8, 12), guitar (2–12), keyboards (2, 7, 10), bass (7); production (all tracks)
- Chris Gaylor – drums (6, 9, 11), background vocals (11)
- Mike Kennerty – guitar (6)

=== Additional musicians ===
- Scott Chesak – production (all tracks), keyboards (2–5, 7, 8, 11, 12), bass (2, 4, 5), drums (2, 7, 11), background vocals (2, 11), percussion (4), banjo (5)
- Ian Miller – accordion (10)
- Josh Scalf – horn (10)
- Tyler Jaeger – horn (10)
- The Crewjects – background vocals (12)
- Sebastian Tenorio-Vallejo – guitar (12)

=== Technical personnel ===
- Ted Jensen – mastering (2–11)
- Adam Hawkins – mixing (2, 7, 8)
- Vance Powell – mixing (3–6, 9–11)
- Herbie Mortera – engineering (2–11)
- Greg Cortez – engineering (9, 11)
- Nico Ludwig-Stock – engineering (9)
- Tara Farrell – engineering (9)
- Edgar Camey – engineering (11)
