= Sweat (The All-American Rejects song) =

Single by The All-American Rejects
- B-side: "Close Your Eyes"
- Released: July 7, 2017
- Recorded: 2016
- Genre: Alternative rock; power pop
- Length: 3:04
- Label: Interscope
- Songwriters: Tyson Ritter; Ido Zmishlany
- Producer: Ido Zmishlany

The All-American Rejects singles chronology
| "There's a Place" (2015) | "Sweat" (2017) | "Send Her to Heaven" (2019) |

"Sweat" is a song by American rock band The All-American Rejects, released on July 7, 2017. "Sweat" was released alongside another song, "Close Your Eyes", in addition to an accompanying 11-minute music video.

== Background and composition ==
"Sweat" was written by Tyson Ritter and Ido Zmishlany, being the first single by the band to not feature Nick Wheeler as a songwriter, and the first single by the band to feature a writer outside of the band members.

In the music video for "Sweat", Ritter plays a man named Robert, whose alter ego (Betsy) is a drag queen. "He (Robert) met someone in his early days, she ruined his chances at having a happy existence and family so to punish himself, he dressed up as her."

The song is an upbeat arena pop-rock anthem in the key of F. One thing that sets it apart from other songs by the band could be the loose instrumentation of the verses, as well as lead guitarist Nick Wheeler's 80's inspired glam-rock style solo, which features a sped up (and slowed down) guitar.

== Reception ==
The two song EP received positive feedback from critics. Hailey Nuthals of PopDust wrote positively of the songs, saying they have "a definitive Rejects-in-2017 sound" and that "They are, by nearly every standard, really good songs. They're permeated with shadows that feel comforting real in their darkness, but still sound like the Rejects. It feels like the band has grown with us. That's great." Sophie Trenear of The Edge UK gave the EP 5 stars out of 5. She wrote, "It's summery, it's sexy – it's the comeback from the hiatus you never even knew happened." She favorably compared the song to the band's 2008 smash hit "Gives You Hell", stating, "Reminiscent of the blissfully heedless ‘Gives You Hell’ era, it nevertheless dives headfirst into the band's looming evolution with an anthemic chorus that feels outrageously bold, but doesn't skimp on the sugary hook." Rock 'N' Load magazine was also very positive in their review, calling both the songs and video "exceptional." Markos Papadatos for DigitalJournal.com was highly positive in his review of the EP/video, saying "Overall, their "Sweat" film is visually-striking and a true work of art." Papadatos also stated that "The All-American Rejects have outdone themselves musically and artistically. They are not afraid to showcase their vulnerability as recording artists, and it is safe to say that their vulnerability is their pop-rock listening audience's reward." Papadatos went on to state that "Their "Sweat" film garners an A rating."

== Appearances in popular culture ==
Sweat was featured in the eighth episode of the short-lived NBC sitcom Rise. The song is also used as the background music for the HTC Vive Pro commercial, with Laura Dern and Bryce Dallas Howard.

== Music video ==
The music video for "Sweat" 11 minutes long, and stars lead singer Tyson Ritter as Robert by day and Betsy by night. The video also features "Close Your Eyes". Jamie Thraves wrote and directed the music video, and came up for the idea of Ritter playing a woman. "I looked up Tyson to see what he looked like, and I said, 'he's got good cheek bones. I bet he'd be up for playing a woman.'"

The short film "Rejected" was released to the band's Vevo page on September 22, 2017. It features a behind the scenes look at the making of the new record, including the "Sweat" film.

== Track listing ==
Digital download

- "Sweat" – 3:04
- "Close Your Eyes" – 4:28
- Note: "Close Your Eyes" was written by Benedetto Rotondi and Tyson Ritter, and was produced by Rotondi (as Benny Cassette).

== Charts ==
In the United States, the song charted on the Hot Rock Songs chart during its first week at number 21, as well as the Rock Digital Songs chart the same week at number 10. The song quickly fell off both. The song later entered the Top 40 chart, and remained there for 10 weeks, peaking at number 29.

| Chart (2017) | Peak position |
|---|---|
| Czech Republic Modern Rock (IFPI) | 4 |
| US Adult Pop Airplay (Billboard) | 29 |
| US Hot Rock & Alternative Songs (Billboard) | 21 |

== Release history ==
| Country | Date | Format | Label |
|---|---|---|---|
| United States | July 7, 2017 | Digital download | Interscope |
| Worldwide | July 7, 2017 | Digital download | Interscope |
| United Kingdom | July 7, 2017 | Digital download | Polydor |
