= It Ends Tonight =

Single by The All-American Rejects

from the album Move Along
- Released: September 19, 2006
- Recorded: 2005
- Genre: Alternative rock; emo
- Length: 4:04 (album version); 3:43 (radio edit)
- Label: Interscope; Doghouse
- Songwriters: Nick Wheeler; Tyson Ritter
- Producer: Howard Benson

The All-American Rejects singles chronology
"Move Along" (2006)	"It Ends Tonight" (2006)	"Gives You Hell" (2008)

Music video
- "It Ends Tonight" on YouTube

"It Ends Tonight" is a song by American rock band The All-American Rejects from their second studio album Move Along. It was released on September 19, 2006, as the third and final single from the album.

== Background and composition ==
"It Ends Tonight" was written by Nick Wheeler and Tyson Ritter. Along with the title track, it was one of the last songs written for Move Along and as revealed by the band in an interview on Soundstage is about a "dude" rather than addressed to a female love interest.

The song utilizes a string section, with an arrangement by composer Deborah Lurie.

== Reception ==
=== Critical reception ===
The song received mostly positive reviews from music critics. About.com commented: "'It Ends Tonight' will provide a suitably dreamy sounding late evening mood for the band's eager fans, but it fails to reach the distinctiveness of their previous hits 'Dirty Little Secret' and 'Move Along'. The lyrics kick off in intriguing fashion with 'Your subtleties / They strangle me,' but that is as good as it gets. Ultimately, it's a grandly ambiguous tune about the end of a generic relationship."

Contactmusic.com responded positively to the track, saying that they loved hearing the band "take a break from the perfect guitar power-pop of recent singles and show their softer side with a piano-led ballad. The track shows off singer Tyson Ritter's powerful vocals and has provided their legion of fans with a perfect lighters-up pause in the set."

=== Chart performance ===
"It Ends Tonight" peaked at No. 8 on the Billboard Hot 100, making it The All-American Rejects' highest charting song in the U.S and Australia, until the release of their single "Gives You Hell" in 2008 which reached position No. 4 on the Billboard Hot 100 in early 2009.

== Music video ==
The music video for "It Ends Tonight" was directed by Wayne Isham and shot in July 2006 in Moapa Indian Reservation in the Nevada desert, before premiering on Total Request Live a month later on August 28. The video portrays the band throwing an impromptu concert/fireworks show near a truck stop in the middle of nowhere. Prior to the performance, a road-weary Tyson Ritter is seen shopping at a nearby fireworks store, stocking up on a huge supply before hauling them out to the desert in his shopping cart and releasing them. The fireworks also serve as a backdrop for the concert, and the audience joins in setting them off, including an attractive brunette Ritter had met at the fireworks shop earlier that night. Morning breaks as the band sings the lyric "When darkness turns to light," and the band members are seen walking off into the distance.

== Appearances in popular culture ==
"It Ends Tonight" is featured in the television shows Laguna Beach: The Real Orange County and All My Children as well as various commercials for TV shows such as One Tree Hill, Battlestar Galactica and Burn Notice. The song has also made an appearance in the video game Karaoke Revolution Presents: American Idol Encore. The song is also used as the background music for the Surface Studio commercial, with Julie Delpy and Scarlett Johansson.

The band performed the song on an episode of Smallville.

"It Ends Tonight" has also been covered by bands such as Overboard and Joy Electric.

== Track listing ==
CD single/7-inch vinyl
No.	Title	Length
1.	"It Ends Tonight" (radio edit)	3:43
2.	"Dirty Little Secret" (live from the Wiltern)	3:10

== Charts ==
=== Weekly charts ===
Chart (2006–2007)	Peak position
Australia (ARIA)	52
Canada Hot 100 (Billboard)	39
Canada CHR/Top 40 (Billboard)	20
Canada Hot AC (Billboard)	13
New Zealand (Recorded Music NZ)	39
Scottish Singles Sales (Official Charts)	42
UK Singles (Official Charts)	66
US Billboard Hot 100	8
US Adult Pop Airplay (Billboard)	7
US Pop Airplay (Billboard)	8

=== Year-end charts ===
Chart (2007)	Position
US Billboard Hot 100	55
US Adult Top 40 (Billboard)	26

== Release history ==
Region	Date	Format	Label	Ref.
United States	September 19, 2006	Contemporary hit radio	Interscope	
United States	September 19, 2006	CD	Interscope	
United Kingdom	September 25, 2006	7-inch vinyl; CD	Polydor	
