= Rich Lee =

American film director

- Born: Reno, Nevada, U.S.
- Occupations: Music video director; commercial director

Richard T. Lee is an American music video and commercial director. He has directed music videos for Eminem, Lana Del Rey, Maroon 5, The Black Eyed Peas, Norah Jones, Michael Bublé and The All-American Rejects.

== Career ==
Lee started his professional career as a sculptor and fabricator for Broadway shows in New York City. He later moved on to computer graphics and created 3-D previsualizations for big budget Hollywood feature films such as the first three Pirates of the Caribbean films, I Am Legend, Minority Report and Constantine.

From the encouragement of feature film directors, he moved into directing music videos and commercials. He has directed commercials for brands like Fiat, Hyundai, Honda, and Beats by Dre.

== Videography ==
=== Film ===
- War of the Worlds (2025)
- Resident Evil Requiem: Evil Has Always Had a Name (short film, 2026) (co-directed with Franciska Friede)

=== Television ===
Year	Title	Episode
2016	Limitless	"Sands, Agent of Morra"
2019	The Society	"Poison"

=== Music video ===
Year	Title	Artist(s)
2005	"Just Like You"	Buckfast
2006	"Grown and Sexy"	Chamillionaire
2006	"Don't Wait"	Dashboard Confessional
2006	"All of the Above"	Big City Rock
2007	"Clumsy" (Note: Directed with Marc Webb)	Fergie
2007	"Good Enough" (Note: Directed with Marc Webb)	Evanescence
2007	"Lie to Me"	12 Stones
2007	"She's Got You High"	Mumm-Ra
2008	"It's Over"	Jesse McCartney
2009	"How Do You Sleep?"	Jesse McCartney
2009	"I Will Not Bow"	Breaking Benjamin
2009	"Chasing Pirates"	Norah Jones
2009	"Haven't Met You Yet"	Michael Bublé
2009	"Dollhouse"	Priscilla Renea
2009	"The Wind Blows"	The All-American Rejects
2009	"I Wanna" (UK version)	The All-American Rejects
2009	"Hush Hush; Hush Hush"	The Pussycat Dolls
2010	"Coming Home" (featuring Skylar Grey) (Note: Skylar Grey does not appear)	Diddy – Dirty Money
2010	"The Time (Dirty Bit)"	The Black Eyed Peas
2010	"Beautiful Dangerous" (featuring Fergie)	Slash
2010	"Check It Out"	will.i.am and Nicki Minaj
2010	"Hollywood"	Michael Bublé
2010	"Touch"	Natasha Bedingfield
2010	"Not Afraid"	Eminem
2010	"Imma Be Rocking That Body" (Note: "Imma Be" and "Rock That Body" combined into one video)	The Black Eyed Peas
2010	"Gettin' Over You" (featuring Fergie and LMFAO)	David Guetta and Chris Willis
2011	"Don't Hold Your Breath"	Nicole Scherzinger
2011	"21st Century Girl"	Willow Smith
2011	"Don't Wanna Go Home"	Jason Derulo
2011	"Lighters" (featuring Bruno Mars)	Bad Meets Evil
2011	"T.H.E. (The Hardest Ever)" (featuring Jennifer Lopez and Mick Jagger)	will.i.am
2012	"She's So Mean"	Matchbox Twenty
2012	"My Life" (featuring Eminem and Adam Levine)	50 Cent
2013	"Love Somebody"	Maroon 5
2013	"Rap God"	Eminem
2013	"The Monster" (featuring Rihanna)	Eminem
2014	"It's On Again" (featuring Kendrick Lamar)	Alicia Keys
2014	"Love Never Felt So Good" (featuring Justin Timberlake)	Michael Jackson
2014	"L.A. Love (La La)" (featuring YG)	Fergie
2015	"Phenomenal"	Eminem
2017	"Cold" (featuring Future)	Maroon 5
2017	"Love" "Lust for Life" (featuring The Weeknd) "White Mustang"	Lana Del Rey
2017	"Walk on Water" (featuring Beyoncé)	Eminem
2018	"Venom"	Eminem
2019	"Fuck It, I Love You"/"The Greatest"	Lana Del Rey
2019	"Doin' Time"	Lana Del Rey
2019	"All the Good Girls Go to Hell"	Billie Eilish
2020	"Girl Like Me"	Black Eyed Peas and Shakira
2022	"Cruel"	Jackson Wang
2022	"Come Alive"	Jackson Wang
2023	"Candy Necklace"(featuring Jon Batiste)	Lana Del Rey
2024	"Houdini"	Eminem
