= The Wind Blows (song) =

Single by The All-American Rejects

from the album When the World Comes Down
- Released: April 21, 2009
- Recorded: 2007
- Studio: Barefoot Studios (Los Angeles, California)
- Genre: Pop rock; power pop
- Length: 4:22 (album version); 3:59 (radio edit version)
- Label: DGC; Interscope
- Songwriters: Nick Wheeler; Tyson Ritter
- Producer: Eric Valentine

The All-American Rejects singles chronology
"Gives You Hell" (2008)	"The Wind Blows" (2009)	"I Wanna" (2009)

Music video
- "The Wind Blows" on YouTube

"The Wind Blows" is a song by American rock band The All-American Rejects, released as the second single from their third studio album When the World Comes Down on April 21, 2009.

== Background ==
"The Wind Blows" (originally titled "Alone Again") was written by Nick Wheeler and Tyson Ritter, originally for American singer-songwriter Gwen Stefani prior to the release of When the World Comes Down, but was ultimately turned down by her record label.

During the recording sessions for When the Word Comes Down, the band's A&R manager Jeff Sosnow provided producer Eric Valentine with a digital audio library of The All-American Rejects demo songs, where in which the latter person discovered "The Wind Blows". Seeing its potential, Valentine reintroduced the demo to the band, who were uncertain on the song's sound at the time. The band decided to rewrite its chorus and eventually re-record it for the album.

Album-wise on When the World Comes Down, "The Wind Blows" is segued into by the previous track "Believe".

== Reception ==
=== Critical reception ===
The song received mixed reviews from music critics. An examiner for the Billboard Hot 100 said that they were unsure about the song's soft and mellow sound "for a band that claims to be alternative rock" and compared it to ballad songs by Maroon 5 and Green Day. They however praised its lyrics, saying "the message about getting through ruff times is actually a good one."

=== Chart performance ===
"The Wind Blows" peaked at number 13 on the Bubbling Under Hot 100 Singles and the number 34 on the Mainstream Top 40, before slowly beginning to lose public interest.

== Music video ==
The All American Rejects music video for "The Wind Blows" was directed by Rich Lee and shot between March 30 and 31, 2009 in Malibu, California and was released a month later on April 27. It revolves around the relationship between a character played by lead singer Tyson Ritter and his girlfriend - eventually reaching a neutral ending - with scenes of the band performing the song on the shore of a beach overlapped through the video.

A second version, featuring alternative scenes of the relationship between Ritter's character and his girlfriend, was later released in October 2009.

=== Reception ===
EMVees reviewed the music video and praised its camera work and effects, but felt that they "hurt" the video and got overused, especially on the numerous close-ups of Ritter and the beach scenes. They also thought that the scenes between Ritter and his significant other were "never fully fleshed out as much as they could be", but admitted that with a more fleshed out story, the video could easily be the band's best yet and "makes a person very excited to see where their next music video and song are going".

== Track listing ==
CD promo
No.	Title	Length
1.	"The Wind Blows" (radio edit version)	3:59
2.	"The Wind Blows" (album version)	4:22

The Remixes EP
No.	Title	Length
1.	"The Wind Blows" (Steve Aoki remix)	4:21
2.	"The Wind Blows" (Thomas Gold remix)	6:48
3.	"The Wind Blows" (Felix Cartal remix)	4:27
4.	"The Wind Blows" (Ocelot remix)	7:21
Total length:		22:57

== Chart performance ==
Chart (2009)	Peak position
US Bubbling Under Hot 100 (Billboard)	13
US Pop Airplay (Billboard)	34
US Billboard Pop 100	56

== Release history ==
Country	Date	Format	Label
United States	April 21, 2009	CD promo; digital download	Interscope
United Kingdom	October 15, 2009	CD promo; digital download	Polydor
