= There's a Place (The All-American Rejects song) =

Single by The All-American Rejects
- Released: October 30, 2015
- Recorded: 2015
- Genre: Alternative rock; folk rock; acoustic
- Length: 4:27
- Label: Interscope
- Songwriter: Tyson Ritter
- Producer: Greg Wells

The All-American Rejects singles chronology
| "Heartbeat Slowing Down" (2012) | "There's a Place" (2015) | "Sweat" (2017) |

"There's a Place" is a song by American rock band The All-American Rejects, released October 30, 2015 by Interscope Records as the soundtrack to the film Miss You Already (2015), in which frontman Tyson Ritter appears.

== Background ==
Tyson Ritter wrote "There's a Place" while filming Miss You Already in 2014. Ritter spoke of the song, saying, "I had this ringing in my ear. Having not composed a piece of music for over a year at that point, I didn’t recognize that I was hearing a melody. With that melody, came the words. Immediately I knew what it was, it was a song for Milly, a song that was written as a goodbye note to her loved ones. ‘There’s A Place’ is something I’m very proud of as it came from the purest center of myself. As soon as I finished the demo, I sent it to Catherine and she was into it, and as simple as that, it was in the movie.”

In 2014, Ritter and lead guitarist Nick Wheeler played an acoustic version of the song at The Hotel Cafe. Because Ritter plays the main guitar part in the song, Nick Wheeler plays whaling slide tones, moving Mike Kennerty to play bass.

"There's a Place" is the only studio-released song by the band written solely by Ritter without the collaboration of Nick Wheeler.

== Music video ==
The music video was shot in September 2015 and directed Catherine Hardwicke. It was released on the same day as the song itself on October 30, 2015.

The video follows Ritter, who sings the song to Toni Collette from the street, as he ages throughout the video. The whole band appears in the video, playing their instruments on the street.

== Track listing ==
Digital download

1. "There's a Place" – 4:27

== Charts ==
| Chart (2015) | Peak position |
|---|---|
| US Rock Digital Songs (Billboard) | 33 |

== Release history ==
| Country | Date | Format | Label |
|---|---|---|---|
| United States | October 27, 2015 | Mainstream radio | Interscope |
| Various | October 30, 2015 | Digital download | Interscope |
