= Air (Tyson Ritter song) =

Song by Tyson Ritter
- Released: November 5, 2013
- Recorded: 2012
- Genre: Alternative rock; pop rock; power pop
- Length: 3:19
- Label: DGC; Interscope
- Songwriters: Tyson Ritter; Greg Wells; Nate Blasdell
- Producer: Greg Wells

"Air" is a song by American singer-songwriter Tyson Ritter of the rock band The All-American Rejects, released as a solo song on November 5, 2013.

== Background ==
"Air" was written by Tyson Ritter and recorded in 2012. Ritter claimed that the release of the song is not part of a solo project, but "just a one-time thing to tide fans over until the next AAR record"

In an interview with Clizbeats, Ritter stated "It was a long tour in Europe that started this song. It stayed with me because I’ve never written a song on the road before, but somehow this one found me there. It was special. It was the first time I had ever written and recorded a song by myself."

== Release and promotion ==
The song was digitally released on November 5, 2013, onto iTunes and Amazon. It premiered on San Francisco-based modern rock radio station KITS on October 24, 2013, and was later uploaded to The All-American Rejects' official YouTube channel on October 28.

== Reception ==
The song received mixed to positive reviews from music critics. Nelipot stated upon the release of "Air" as "three minutes of catchy hooks, on-point vocals and an infectious drum-beat that would not be out of place on any previously released work by the full band with a typically AAR sing along chorus that will sure to be a crowd favorite when played live."

Mind Equals Blown were more negative, criticizing Ritter's vocals as "in a tone where [he] sounds like a whiny high school kid who hasn't reached puberty yet," but overall said the song was a "decent effort".

== Appearances in popular culture ==
"Air" appeared in an episode of the American comedy-drama series Parenthood, which also stars Ritter as Oliver Rome.

== Track listing ==
Digital download

- "Air" - 3:19

== Release history ==
Country	Date	Format	Label
Canada	November 5, 2013	Digital download	DGC, Interscope
United States	November 5, 2013	Digital download	DGC, Interscope
Worldwide	November 6, 2013	Digital download	DGC, Interscope
United Kingdom	November 6, 2013	Digital download	Polydor
