= House Party Tour (The All-American Rejects) =

2025–2026 concert tour by The All-American Rejects

- Tour by The All-American Rejects
- Start date: April 24, 2025
- End date: May 15, 2026
- Legs: 2

The House Party Tour was a concert tour and series of pop-up performances by American rock band The All-American Rejects between 2025 and 2026. Rather than performing primarily in traditional concert venues, the band staged shows at private residences, college campuses, parks, drive-in theaters, skating rinks, and other unconventional locations across the United States.

The tour attracted national media coverage for its unconventional format and direct audience engagement. Coverage by CNN, USA Today, Rolling Stone, Billboard, The Daily Beast, Yahoo Entertainment, and other outlets highlighted the band's efforts to bring live music to non-traditional spaces, reduce barriers between performers and fans, and provide an alternative to increasingly expensive traditional concert experiences.

The tour generated more than 31 billion online impressions, received over 25,000 venue requests, and attracted more than 850,000 RSVPs. It later served as the basis for Playhouse, a platform that expanded the fan hosted concert model to additional artists and events.

== Background ==
The tour began on April 24, 2025, with a performance at the University of Southern California in Los Angeles. Additional performances followed throughout the United States, including events in Chicago, Minneapolis, Ames, Columbia, Nashville, Fayetteville, Tulsa, Pittsburgh, and Dallas.

Coverage of the tour emphasized its small-scale settings and close audience proximity. A May 2025 performance in Nashville was documented by Rolling Stone, while interviews with the band described the format as a more direct way of engaging with audiences.

According to members of the band, the tour was conceived as an alternative to increasingly expensive traditional concert experiences. The performances emphasized accessibility, spontaneity, and close interaction between artists and audiences.

The tour returned in 2026 for a second leg, with performances staged in Spokane, Medford, Alpine, Albuquerque, Denver, Lawrence, Bloomington, Coldwater, Lancaster, and Brooklyn. Several of these events were organized through Playhouse, a platform developed in partnership with the band to facilitate fan-hosted and non-traditional live music events.

== Reception ==
The House Party Tour received widespread media attention for its unconventional format. Journalists frequently contrasted the performances with traditional arena and theater tours, highlighting the band's decision to perform in backyards, parks, drive-in theaters, skating rinks, and other community spaces.

Coverage also focused on the band's efforts to reduce barriers between artists and audiences. In interviews discussing the tour, members of The All-American Rejects described the project as a response to changing economics within the live music industry and rising ticket prices.

A May 2026 performance at Pear Blossom Park in Medford, Oregon, drew thousands of attendees and received regional coverage from Jefferson Public Radio.

Coverage of the 2026 leg continued to focus on the tour's unconventional approach. Reporting from KPBS, KOB, and KRQE documented performances in private backyards, public parks, and community spaces, while coverage frequently linked the tour to broader concerns about rising concert ticket prices and accessibility within the live music industry.

== Tour dates and pop-up shows ==
Date	City	Venue/Notes
April 24, 2025	Los Angeles, California	USC house party
May 14, 2025	Green Bay, Wisconsin	Phoenix Park pop-up
May 15, 2025	Chicago, Illinois	House party
May 16, 2025	Minneapolis, Minnesota	Bowling alley pop-up
May 17, 2025	Ames, Iowa	Barn pop-up
May 18, 2025	Columbia, Missouri	House party
May 21, 2025	Nashville, Tennessee	House party
July 13, 2025	Fayetteville, Arkansas	Skating rink pop-up
July 14, 2025	Tulsa, Oklahoma	Wompa pop-up
August 8, 2025	Pittsburgh, Pennsylvania	Sheetz pop-up show
August 27, 2025	Dallas, Texas	4DWN Skatepark pop-up
May 1, 2026	Spokane, Washington	House party
May 2, 2026	Medford, Oregon	Pear Blossom Park
May 3, 2026	Alpine, California	Backyard performance
May 6, 2026	Albuquerque, New Mexico	Pop-up performance
May 7, 2026	Denver, Colorado	International Church of Cannabis
May 8, 2026	Lawrence, Kansas	House party
May 9, 2026	Bloomington, Indiana	House party
May 13, 2026	Coldwater, Michigan	Capri Drive-In Theater
May 14, 2026	Lancaster, Ohio	Pop-up performance
May 15, 2026	Brooklyn, New York	Sandbox album release event

== Legacy and Playhouse ==
The House Party Tour has been cited as an example of alternative touring models that emerged in response to rising ticket prices and changing audience expectations. Coverage from national media outlets emphasized the tour's focus on accessibility, community engagement, and unconventional venues.

The House Party Tour directly influenced the creation of Playhouse, a platform launched in 2026 to help artists organize fan-hosted performances and non-traditional live events. According to Forbes, Playhouse expanded upon concepts first tested during the House Party Tour and sought to provide a framework for other artists interested in community-based performances. The All-American Rejects were among the platform's founding participants and returned to the format during the tour's second leg in 2026.

Playhouse was publicly showcased during SXSW 2026 as an extension of the fan-hosted concert model pioneered during the House Party Tour.

In discussing the philosophy behind the project, frontman Tyson Ritter criticized escalating concert costs and argued that live music "shouldn't be a District 1 Hunger Games luxury." Ritter described the House Party Tour and related initiatives as efforts to make live music more accessible and reconnect artists with audiences in smaller, community-focused settings.
