= Send Her to Heaven =

2019 single by the All-American Rejects

Single by The All-American Rejects
- Released: July 16, 2019
- Recorded: 2016–2017
- Genre: Alternative rock; power pop
- Length: 3:12
- Label: Epitaph
- Songwriters: Tyson Ritter; Rivers Cuomo
- Producer: Tony Hoffer

The All-American Rejects singles chronology
"Sweat" (2017)	"Send Her to Heaven" (2019)	"Me vs. the World" (2020)

"Send Her to Heaven" is a song by American rock band The All-American Rejects, released as the stand-alone single from their Send Her to Heaven EP on July 16, 2019. "Send Her to Heaven" was released alongside two other songs, "Gen Why? (DGAF)" and "Demons", in addition to an accompanying music video for the single.

== Background and composition ==
"Send Her to Heaven" was written by Tyson Ritter and Rivers Cuomo of Weezer during a writing session between the two frontmen. This marks the second collaboration between the two, after they wrote "Put Me Back Together" for Weezer's Raditude alongside the band's founder and guitarist Nick Wheeler.

All three songs featured on the EP were intended to be released years prior, but due to scheduling conflicts and the bands departure from Interscope Records, they were shelved indefinitely. The original plan was to release them after Sweat. Ritter stated their former label was skeptical to release "DGAF", the intended lead single of their permanently shelved fifth album. Ritter also stated fans can "absolutely" expect another Rejects album in the future. Wheeler also stated in an interview with Alternative Press that fans can expect another album in the future.

== Music video ==
The music video for "Send Her to Heaven" was released simultaneously with the EP on July 16. It stars Cailee Spaeny as Molly. It was directed by Parker Croft, produced by Elisa Croft, co-produced by Aaron Golden and Chris Blim, and executive produced by Ritter and his wife Elena Satine.

== Track listing ==
Digital download

- "Send Her to Heaven" – 3:12
- "Gen Why? (DGAF)" – 3:29
- "Demons" - 3:15
- Note: "Gen Why? (DGAF)" was written by Ritter & Benny Cassette, and produced by Cassette. This marks their second collaboration after 2017's "Close Your Eyes". "Demons" was written by Ritter and produced by Justin Raisen.

== Release history ==
Country	Date	Format	Label
Worldwide	July 16, 2019	Digital download	Epitaph
