= The House Bunny =

2008 film by Fred Wolf

- Theatrical release poster
- Directed by: Fred Wolf
- Written by: Karen McCullah; Kirsten Smith
- Produced by: Adam Sandler; Jack Giarraputo; Allen Covert; Heather Parry; Anna Faris
- Starring: Anna Faris; Emma Stone; Colin Hanks
- Cinematography: Shelly Johnson
- Edited by: Debra Chiate
- Music by: Waddy Wachtel
- Production companies: Columbia Pictures; Relativity Media; Happy Madison Productions; Alta Loma Entertainment
- Distributed by: Sony Pictures Releasing
- Release date: August 22, 2008
- Running time: 97 minutes
- Country: United States
- Language: English
- Budget: $25 million
- Box office: $70.4 million

The House Bunny is a 2008 American comedy film directed by Fred Wolf written by Karen McCullah Lutz and Kirsten Smith, and produced by Adam Sandler, Jack Giarraputo, Anna Faris, Allen Covert, and Heather Parry. The film stars Faris, Emma Stone and Colin Hanks, and tells the story of a former Playboy bunny who signs up to be the "house mother" of an unpopular university sorority after finding out she must leave the Playboy Mansion.

Produced by Happy Madison Productions, Alta Loma Entertainment, and Relativity Media, The House Bunny was released in the United States on August 22, 2008, by Columbia Pictures. It received mixed reviews, but was a box office success, making $70.4 million on a $25 million budget. The film and its soundtrack have gained a cult following.

== Plot ==
Shelley Darlingson is a Playboy Bunny and aspiring Playboy Playmate who grew up in an orphanage but now lives a life of luxury in the Playboy Mansion with Hugh Hefner. The day after her 27th birthday, she awakes to find a note, seemingly from Hefner, asking her to pack up and leave. She remains unaware the note is actually a forgery by jealous rival Playmate Cassandra.

Searching for a new home, Shelley stumbles upon a group of attractive and energetic girls. She follows them and sees that they live in luxury too. They turn out to be the Phi Iota Mu sorority, though she is unable to join them because she is not a student at the college they attend. She tries to become a house mother, but the house mothers snobbishly reject her when she tries to join them.

Shelley makes her way down to the Zeta Alpha Zeta house, which appears to be far less luxurious than Phi Iota Mu. The members of the Zeta house are dowdy, socially awkward, and caught off guard by Shelley's bubbly nature, prompting them to initially reject her. Once they see Shelley's ability to attract boys, the Zetas change their mind and take in Shelley as their new house mother, hoping she can save them: their sorority is in danger of being shut down unless it can get 30 new pledges to join.

During her time with the Zetas, Shelley meets and becomes attracted to an intellectual, altruistic young man named Oliver, who manages a retirement home. She goes on a date with him and uses seductive tactics that previously worked with other men, but they fail because Oliver wants to get to know her as a person. To impress Oliver on their second date, Shelley starts attending classes and reading books, and tones down her appearance. The second date is also a disaster because she wears glasses that obfuscate her vision and brings along notecards to help her sound smarter.

Having had makeovers and lessons on how to attract boys and be popular, the Zetas throw a successful party. Later, while they are reviewing the girls who are hoping to pledge to them, Lilly, a British Zeta sister with social anxiety, says their new popularity has made them conceited and forget the true value of sisterhood. When they realize what they have become, they blame Shelley as she returns from her unsuccessful date.

Shelley is invited back to the Playboy Mansion after Hefner learns of the forged dismissal, but she wants to stay with the Zetas; however, the unexpected attack from them makes her reconsider so she calls back to accept the invitation. The Zetas then feel guilty and decide to give themselves second makeovers, this time combining what they learned from Shelley with their own unique senses of style. They also decide to draw the pledges out at random instead of judging them for their looks and popularity. They show up at Shelley's photo shoot and ask for her to come back, to which she agrees, having changed her mind about her dream of being a centerfold.

Phi Iota Mu intercepts the pledge invitations and prevents them from being mailed out, leaving the Zetas again in danger of being shut down at the campus meeting of the Panhellenic Council. Shelley crashes the meeting and gives a heartfelt speech about what her experience with the Zetas has taught her about love and acceptance and asks for pledges on the spot; gradually, 30 students agree to pledge, and the sorority is saved.

Oliver and Shelley reconcile, and Shelley explains that she was trying too hard to impress him, so they decide to start their relationship anew, with her this time being more true to herself. As the Zetas and their new pledges celebrate, Shelley remains in close contact with Hefner and her friends at the Playboy Mansion.

== Cast ==
- Anna Faris as Shelley Darlingson, an orphaned 27-year old former Playboy Bunny who is forced to find a new home.
- Emma Stone as Natalie Sandler, a nerdy but curious Zeta sister open to new experiences.
- Colin Hanks as Oliver Hauser, Shelley's love interest who manages a retirement home.
- Kat Dennings as Mona Rita, a drab, sarcastic, cynical, and standoffish goth Zeta sister.
- Christopher McDonald as Dean Simmons, the university dean.
- Beverly D'Angelo as Mrs. Hagstrom, the Phi Iota Mu godmother who wants to put an end to the Zeta sorority.
- Katharine McPhee as Harmony Bowels, a pregnant hippie Zeta sister.
- Rumer Willis as Joanne Davis, a Zeta sister who has for years perpetually worn a body brace, which Shelley helps her shed.
- Kiely Williams as Lilly Marsen, a Zeta sister from England with social anxiety who communicates by text only.
- Dana Goodman as Carrie Mae Staten, a masculine Zeta sister from a rural community.
- Kimberly Makkouk as Tanya Spirko, a diminutive Zeta sister.
- Monet Mazur as Cassandra, a new Playboy bunny who schemes to evict Shelley and claim stardom for herself.
- Tyson Ritter as Colby Emmett, Natalie's love interest.
- Sarah Wright as Ashley, the selfish and manipulative leader of the Phi Iota Mu sorority who regularly bullies the Zeta sorority.
- Rachel Specter as Courtney, Ashley's long-suffering assistant.
- Owen Benjamin as Marvin Dixon, the mixologist at the Playboy mansion and Cassandra's unwilling partner against Shelley.
- Matt Barr as Tyler, the leader of Kappa.
- Tyler Spindel as Steve, Joanne's love interest.

Cameos

- Hugh Hefner as himself, the founder of Playboy
- Holly Madison as herself, Hugh's fifth partner.
- Kendra Wilkinson as herself, Hugh's sixth partner.
- Bridget Marquardt as herself, Hugh's eighth partner.
- Justin Baldoni as Waiter
- Allen Covert as Waiter
- Dan Patrick as a Cop
- Nick Swardson as a Playboy Photographer
- Jonathan Loughran as a Crossdressing prisoner
- Shaquille O'Neal as himself
- Matt Leinart as himself
- Sara Jean Underwood as herself
- Lauren Michelle Hill as herself
- Louise Cochrane as herself
- Hayley Fisher as herself
- Hiromi Oshima as herself
- Charles Robinson as Francis

== Production ==
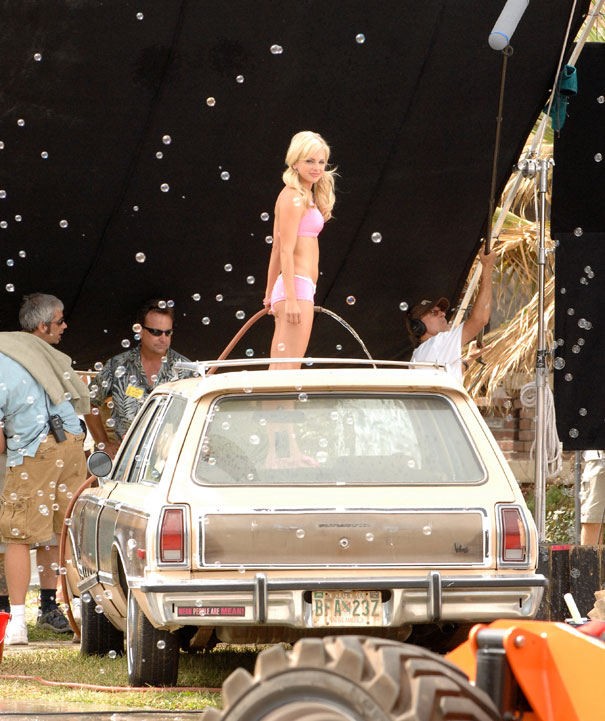
Anna Faris filming a scene from the movie in 2007

Anna Faris originally pitched the idea of a Playboy bunny kicked out of the mansion to screenwriters Karen McCullah and Kirsten Smith. In Faris' initial pitch, the story had a darker tone and revolved around a Playboy model returning to the midwest and falling into drugs. A few months later, the screenwriters combined it with an idea they'd had about a mismatched sorority house and house mother. The line "eyes are the nipples of the face" is, to the writers, "one of our proudest accomplishments, which really shows you how weird our job is."

The trio eventually landed a meeting with Adam Sandler's company, Happy Madison Productions, when a producer got wind of their idea. Sandler, who had previously worked with Faris on The Hot Chick (2002), liked the story and signed on to develop the film, making it the first female-driven movie produced by his company. The working title of the film was I Know What Boys Like.

The film was shot over the summer of 2007. Faris had a nude scene originally meant to be filmed with a body double, but she decided to do the scene herself.

== Reception ==
=== Critical reception ===
On Rotten Tomatoes The House Bunny has an approval rating of 44% based on 124 reviews, with an average rating of 5.10/10. The site's critical consensus reads, "Anna Faris is game, but she can't salvage this middling, formulaic comedy." On Metacritic, the film has a weighted average score of 55 out of 100, based on 22 critics, indicating "mixed or average reviews". Audiences polled by CinemaScore gave the film an average grade of "B+" on an A+ to F scale.

Variety's John Anderson stated the film is a "Blissfully broad comedy that should catapult Anna Faris into a singular kind of stardom." Nathan Lee of The New York Times wrote the film "puts a cheerful spin on its many clichés", and "this particular wheel hasn’t been reinvented, but at least it gets a nice fresh coat of bubblegum-pink paint and a star to pilot it with aplomb."

=== Box office ===
On August 22, 2008, The House Bunny was released in the US. It debuted at #1 on its first day of release making $5.91 million, but ultimately landed in second place for its opening weekend, making $14.53 million, behind Ben Stiller's action-comedy film Tropic Thunder, which made $16.2 million. The film grossed $70 million worldwide ($48 million in North America and $22 million internationally). The film debuted in the UK chart at #1 grossing almost $1 million in its first weekend.

== Home media ==
The film was released on DVD and Blu-ray on December 19, 2008, by Sony Pictures Home Entertainment. It was also released in a 6-movie collection called The Laugh Out Loud Collection with other Happy Madison films in 2013.

== Music ==
Though a soundtrack was not released, a single was released to iTunes on July 16, 2008. The single was a cover of The Waitresses song, "I Know What Boys Like" (produced by Chad Hugo of The Neptunes) as performed by Katharine McPhee (featuring Kat Dennings, Emma Stone, and Rumer Willis) and including lyrics about the Zeta sisters. The trailers for the film included the songs "U + Ur Hand" by P!nk and "Do It Well" by Jennifer Lopez. The film also featured songs by artists including:

- Bow Wow Wow – "I Want Candy"
- The All-American Rejects – "I Wanna"
- Altered Images – "Happy Birthday"
- Madonna – "Like a Virgin"
- Rihanna – "Take a Bow"
- The Pussycat Dolls – "When I Grow Up"
- Ashlee Simpson – "Boys"
- Metro Station – "Shake It"
- DJ Colette – "Think You Want It" produced by Tim K
- The Cab – "I'll Run"
- Elizaveta – "Like Water"
- Yael Naim – "New Soul"
- The Kills – "Sour Cherry"
- Boys Like Girls – "The Great Escape"
- The Ting Tings – "Great DJ" and "Shut Up and Let Me Go"
- Ingrid Michaelson – "Be OK"
- Avril Lavigne – "Girlfriend"
- Mercedes – "Better Than a Psychic"
