= Gives You Hell =

2008 single by the All-American Rejects

Single by the All-American Rejects

from the album When the World Comes Down
- B-side: "On the Floor"
- Released: September 30, 2008
- Recorded: 2007–2008
- Studio: Skywalker Ranch Studios (San Rafael, California)
- Genre: Pop-punk; pop rock; power pop
- Length: 3:33
- Label: DGC; Interscope
- Songwriters: Nick Wheeler; Tyson Ritter
- Producer: Eric Valentine

The All-American Rejects singles chronology
"It Ends Tonight" (2006)	"Gives You Hell" (2008)	"The Wind Blows" (2009)

Music video
- "Gives You Hell" on YouTube

"Gives You Hell" is a song by American rock band the All-American Rejects, released as the lead single from their third studio album, When the World Comes Down on September 30, 2008.

The song is The All-American Rejects' most successful song to date, receiving positive reviews and topping the Billboard's Mainstream Top 40 and Adult Top 40 charts as well as peaking at number four on the Hot 100 chart. In 2026 It was certified RIAA Diamond for ten million shipments.

On May 28, 2025, the song charted on the TikTok Viral Top 50, debuting at 37. The song went viral on TikTok in 2025 which gained a resurgence in popularity on YouTube and Spotify.

== Background and composition ==
"Gives You Hell" was written by Nick Wheeler and Tyson Ritter in Vancouver, British Columbia, Canada on a secluded writing trip for the band's third studio album, and recorded at George Lucas' Skywalker Ranch studios in California.

Ritter stated the song "is about this asshole, it's a dude who will never know it's about him. It's kind of this tongue-in-cheek way of looking at someone you hate, whether it's your mom, for some reason, or it's your teacher at school, or it's your boss at work. It's just someone who makes you struggle, and it's giving them the finger." It should be stated that this statement contradicts the nature of the song's lyrics which are overtly directed at a hypothetical former lover or spouse.

In an interview with Vevo, the pair described how the song started out as "a cheesy Wurli and a drum loop", and how unsure they were on its sound that it nearly did not make the final track listing for When the World Comes Down. But after a phone conversation with music producer Jimmy Iovine, who praised the song's lyrics and instrumental mix, the band decided to add it to the album's track list.

On the composition of the track, Wheeler described the process, "You hear an acoustic guitar, like this wacky E6 chord fading in the beginning and that's all you hear. Yeah, that's all you hear until the second verse. Then a little acoustic guitar comes in – actually the acoustic guitar carries the whole thing until that last chorus. That's when like the big monster comes in. It's just the acoustic guitar in the chorus and you hear that little lead line right before the 3rd verse. It's little moments like that. If every part on the record is thought out and holds its place in the song, then you don't need more than just those special parts. It's not about taking a big guitar and layering the crap out of it. It's not about that. Every part, from the vocals to the guitar parts to the drum fills, really hold their place in the song."

In a further interview with MTV, Wheeler commented that "We wanted the backing vocalists to sound like a —'bunch of drunk assholes', so we had the crew and us drink a beer for every take and yelled the chorus into a microphone. We got so drunk we were over-thinking it!"

== Reception ==
=== Critical reception ===
The song received favorable reviews from music critics. About.com rated the track four out of five stars and described it as a "soulful groove", saying "The lyrics are filled with a cleverly snarky attitude. The attitude of 'Dirty Little Secret' is here in full force, and you will likely find yourself singing along", while Digital Spy, who rated the track three out of five stars, described it as "Sum 41-style guitars and a cheery singalong outro, it certainly isn't innovative, but as many of their contemporaries have begun dabbling in politics and darker musical styles, there's a certain charm to the band's blissful ignorance of changing fashions."

Billboard compared the sound of the track to Queen's "We Will Rock You".

In 2018, Rock Sound magazine listed the song as the fourth best break-up song of all time.

=== Chart performance ===
In the United States, "Gives You Hell" entered the Billboard Hot 100 at position number 69 and climbed steadily for seven weeks before breaking into the top 10 at position number 10, giving the band their third and last top 10 hit on the chart, before eventually peaking at number four on the Hot 100, making "Gives You Hell" the All-American Rejects' most successful single to date and their first top five hit, remaining in the charts for 36 weeks before it was retired. It spent 14 consecutive weeks in the top 10, including five weeks in the top five.

The song eventually topped the US Billboard Top 40 Mainstream chart in March 2009, and followed on to reach the top spot of the US Hot Adult Top 40 Tracks the following May, making "Gives You Hell" the band's first ever number one on any music chart to date. Internationally, the track became The All-American Rejects' best-selling single, reaching the top five in Canada and Australia and the top 20 in the United Kingdom, Ireland, and New Zealand by early 2009.

In late 2009, Billboard announced that "Gives You Hell" was the most played song of that year on their top 40 chart. The song also became the 42nd biggest selling rock song of the 21st century in the United Kingdom.

=== Accolades ===
Year	Awards ceremony	Award	Results
2009	Teen Choice Awards	Choice Music: Rock Track	Nominated
2010	APRA Awards	International Work of the Year	Nominated

== Music video ==
The music video for "Gives You Hell" was directed by Marc Webb and shot in October 2008 in California and was released a month later on November 3. It revolves around two alter egos of lead singer/keyboardist/bassist Tyson Ritter – one as a traditional family man and the other as a lay-about nocturnal garage band singer (the band of which is made up of the other members of the All-American Rejects) – as neighbors annoying and pulling pranks on each other due to their different lifestyles and behaviors, while scenes of the band themselves performing the song as the garage band are overlapped through the video.

A second version was later released in January 2009, primarily featuring an extended version of the performance scene from the first.

In an interview with MTV about the video, Ritter said "The video basically pits one neighbor against another terrible neighbor, who lives on a completely opposite schedule. He's not on the grid – he's not on, like the song says, 'a 9-to-5 pace.' And this guy's living the cookie-cutter life, with his white picket fence, and his wife who brings him lemonade when he's washing the car, So it's kind of like the clash of those worlds; only at the end, there's kind of a twist, where the two worlds kind of flip-flop."

== Appearances in popular culture ==
"Gives You Hell" was featured on the musical comedy-drama television show Glee in the episode "Hell-O". The song was sung by the character Rachel Berry played by Lea Michele. The Glee version reached the top of Irish Singles Chart.

The song is also featured in the video games Rock Band, Guitar Hero 5, Band Hero and Tap Tap Revenge 2. The song is also used as intro music for the home games of the Missouri Mavericks hockey team in Independence, Missouri.

In the episode three of Betas, a background person is singing "Gives You Hell" for karaoke.

The song "Don't Freak Out" by LilHuddy samples the track, which credits both Ritter and Wheeler accordingly.

== Track listing ==
CD single
No.	Title	Length
1.	"Gives You Hell"	3:33
2.	"Gives You Hell" (Limousine remix)	3:23
3.	"Gives You Hell" (music video)	3:38

7-inch vinyl
No.	Title	Length
1.	"Gives You Hell" (side A)	3:33
2.	"On the Floor" (demo, side B)	2:53

Maxi single
No.	Title	Length
1.	"Gives You Hell"	3:33
2.	"Gives You Hell" (Limousine remix)	3:25
3.	"On the Floor" (demo)	2:53
4.	"Gives You Hell" (music video)

The Remixes EP
No.	Title	Length
1.	"Gives You Hell" (Ocelot remix)	6:28
2.	"Gives You Hell" (Bloody Beetroots remix)	4:32
3.	"Gives You Hell" (Limousines extended remix)	5:14
4.	"Gives You Hell" (EL-P remix)	3:32

== Charts ==
=== Weekly charts ===
Chart (2009–2010)	Peak position
Australia (ARIA)	3
Austria (Ö3 Austria Top 40)	7
Belgium (Ultratip Bubbling Under Flanders)	3
Belgium (Ultratip Bubbling Under Wallonia)	15
Canada Hot 100 (Billboard)	4
Canada CHR/Top 40 (Billboard)	3
Canada Hot AC (Billboard)	2
Czech Republic Airplay (ČNS IFPI)	10
France (SNEP)	29
Germany (GfK)	15
Hungary (Rádiós Top 40)	38
Ireland (IRMA)	16
Japan (Billboard)	41
Netherlands (Dutch Top 40)	25
Netherlands (Single Top 100)	38
New Zealand (Recorded Music NZ)	18
Slovakia Airplay (ČNS IFPI)	11
Switzerland (Schweizer Hitparade)	30
Scottish Singles Sales (Official Charts)	9
UK Singles (Official Charts)	18
US Billboard Hot 100	4
US Adult Pop Airplay (Billboard)	1
US Alternative Airplay (Billboard)	25
US Pop Airplay (Billboard)	1

=== Year-end charts ===
Chart (2009)	Position
Australia (ARIA)	19
Austria (Ö3 Austria Top 40)	30
Canada (Canadian Hot 100)	32
Germany (Media Control GfK)	66
Hungary (Rádiós Top 40)	158
Netherlands (Dutch Top 40)	154
UK Singles (OCC)	120
US Billboard Hot 100	10
US Adult Top 40 (Billboard)	6
US Mainstream Top 40 (Billboard)	1

=== Decade-end charts ===
Chart (2000–2009)	Position
Australia (ARIA)	76

== Certifications ==
Region	Certification	Certified units/sales
Australia (ARIA)	Platinum	70,000^{^}
Germany (BVMI)	Gold	150,000^{‡}
New Zealand (RMNZ)	3× Platinum	90,000^{‡}
United Kingdom (BPI)	Platinum	600,000^{‡}
United States (RIAA)	Diamond	10,000,000^{‡}
^{^} Shipments figures based on certification alone.^{‡} Sales+streaming figures based on certification alone.

== Release history ==
Country	Date	Format	Label
United States	September 30, 2008	CD single; digital download	DGC; Interscope
United States	October 7, 2008	Mainstream radio	DGC; Interscope
New Zealand	November 27, 2008	CD single; digital download	Universal Music Group
Australia	January 17, 2009	CD single; digital download	Universal Music Group
Canada	January 26, 2009	CD single; digital download	Interscope
United Kingdom	February 1, 2009	CD single; 7-inch vinyl	Polydor
Germany	April 3, 2009	Maxi single; 7-inch vinyl	Universal Music Group
Switzerland	April 3, 2009	Maxi single; 7-inch vinyl	Universal Music Group

== Bibliography ==
- Interscope Database Info
