= The Kristin Brooks Hope Center =

Suicide prevention organization

- Abbreviation: KBHC
- Founded: May 20, 1998; 28 years ago
- Founder: H. Reese Butler II
- Type: 501(c)(3)
- Tax ID no.: 68-0342550
- Legal status: Public benefit corporation
- President: H. Reese Butler II
- Directors: Joel Bockovitch, Benedria D. Smith, Casey Strom, Danny Adams
- Revenue: $84,423 (2020)
- Expenses: $85,013 (2020)
- Website: www.imalive.org

The Kristin Brooks Hope Center (KBHC), an American 501(c)(3) public benefit corporation, was founded on May 20, 1998, by H. Reese Butler II after the death of his wife, Kristin Brooks Rossell Butler, who died by suicide in 1998. Realizing an urgency in this high profile public health crisis, which kills more than 34,000 Americans per year, KBHC was founded by her survivor with funds from the death benefit provided by her employer. Kristin suffered severe postpartum psychosis (PPP) after losing her unborn child on December 5, 1997. Her struggle with PPP was brought on by the prescription drug Zoloft which resulted in an SSRI syndrome. KBHC is more commonly known as the creator of the first network of suicide hotlines in the United States networked under the toll free number 1-800-SUICIDE (784-2433).

== History ==
H. Reese Butler II started the Kristin Brooks Hope Center after he received a check from his wife's employer which was a death benefit amounting to one year's salary. The amount was $34,017. Reese decided to donate the money to an organization focused on preventing suicide as a result of postpartum depression or psychosis. Upon learning there was no such organization in 1998, he decided to donate it to an organization that ran a national suicide hotline for people in crisis. Upon learning that in 1998 that there was no national suicide hotline linking the more than 800 community based suicide crisis hotlines, he founded the Kristin Brooks Hope Center and began linking those community crisis hotlines through 1-888-SUICIDE (784-2433). 1-888-SUICIDE and 1-800-SUICIDE (784-2433) were both part of the National Hopeline Network from its activation September 16, 1998, until the Federal Communications Commission temporarily reassigned it in January 2006.

The US Surgeon General David Satcher dedicated 1-888-SUICIDE (784-2433) on May 7, 1999, during a press conference organized by H. Reese Butler II. The event was filmed by Dempsey Rice, a Brooklyn-based filmmaker (Daughter One Productions), for a project she was working on for HBO. The press event wrapped up with Jock Bartley, founding member of Firefall, singing "Call On Me" written for a 1998 compilation CD to benefit the Colorado-based Pikes Peak Mental Health Crisis Center. Bartley introduced H. Reese Butler II to Jonathan Cain of Journey with the hopes of creating a benefit concert to pay the phone bill for 1-800-SUICIDE (784-2433). The concert took place on November 12, 1999, at the Warfield in San Francisco. It was called "Reason to Live" and featured Firefall as the opening act with Journey headlining. Bev Cobain, cousin to Kurt Cobain and author of the book "When Nothing Matters Anymore" was the Master of Ceremonies for the concert.

== HELP Grant ==
During the three-year federal grant known as the HELP Project, two separate studies to determine the effectiveness of suicide hotlines were conducted using 1-800-SUICIDE (784-2433) to conduct the evaluations. In the credits for the Mishara led study he specifically thanks Reese Butler, the Kristin Brooks Hope Center staff, Jerry Reed, and the Directors and helpers at the crisis centers who participated in this study.
