= Dirty Little Secret =

2005 single by the All-American Rejects

Single by the All-American Rejects

from the album Move Along
- B-side: "Bite Back"
- Released: June 6, 2005
- Genre: Pop-punk; emo
- Length: 3:13
- Label: Doghouse; Interscope
- Songwriters: Nick Wheeler; Tyson Ritter
- Producer: Howard Benson

The All-American Rejects singles chronology
"Time Stands Still" (2003)	"Dirty Little Secret" (2005)	"Move Along" (2006)

Alternative cover
- United Kingdom re-release cover

Audio sample
- file; help

Music video
- "Dirty Little Secret" on YouTube

"Dirty Little Secret" is a song by American rock band the All-American Rejects from their second studio album Move Along. It was released on June 6, 2005, as the lead single from the album.

== Background ==
"Dirty Little Secret" was written by Nick Wheeler and Tyson Ritter, who claimed that because they were both at the time in long-term relationships with their girlfriends they had to "concoct some histrionics". Wheeler said "We come from a small town, and until now we've both had steady relationships. So, you know, sometimes there's not enough drama or turmoil to write about, so he simply writes stories. And that's where the lyrics come from."

"'Dirty Little Secret' was just an acoustic guitar and a vocal, that's all it was", Wheeler said. "We put off getting the full band in and coming up with the arrangement until the very last second. We were literally less than a week away from going into the studio, and we all started jamming and tossing out ideas. We had the arrangement down within an hour and that was that. We ended up recording it and couldn't get the motherfucking thing out of our heads."

== Reception ==
=== Critical reception ===
The song received generally positive reviews from music critics. Contactmusic.com stated "Give this cheeky little track three listens, and it's got you. You'll be singing along at festivals all summer with a huge grin on your face. There may indeed be laws in some countries about having hooks this large and frequent during one song", while About.com said "'Dirty Little Secret' is catchy and amiable, but it's little more than that. The title seems chosen for intrigue, but it promises much more than it delivers. The song is ultimately a rather ordinary treatise on carrying on a secret relationship."

ClickMusic reviewed with "There's nothing exciting about this. It seems such a tired format, a group of guys in their early 20s peddling teenage angst like they were A. It's upbeat, rocky with a typically catchy, if corny, chorus, yet this really seems like one for the fan base only." Music OMH stated "If Simple Plan are a poor man's Green Day, The All-American Rejects are a poor man's Simple Plan. It's fluffy punk pop for middle class American teenage girls who don't want to listen to Ciara and 50 Cent, and would rather get sweaty with boys in eyeliner than shake their booty to the latest Missy Elliott remix."

=== Chart performance ===
"Dirty Little Secret" first charted in the United States on July 30, 2005, and became the band's first top-10 track on the Billboard Hot 100, peaking at number nine in January 2006. The song was later ranked at number 48 on Billboard's "Year-End Hot 100 Singles of 2006". In the United Kingdom, "Dirty Little Secret" was originally released on October 24, 2005, but charted poorly at number 96 on the UK Singles Chart. It was re-released in June 2006 following the success of the band's second single "Move Along" and gave the All-American Rejects their second top-20 hit in the UK.

== Music video ==
The video features anonymous people holding up secrets written on postcards.

The music video for "Dirty Little Secret" was directed by Marcos Siega. It was filmed in May 2005 in Dorney Park & Wildwater Kingdom in Dorneyville, Pennsylvania and various other Allentown locations and was released a month later in mid-June. It features a montage of various people holding up postcards sharing "dirty little secrets" while the band performs the song in an abandoned warehouse with the cards enlarged and displayed behind them in a backdrop.

The postcards in the video were posted by anonymous people onto the website PostSecret, a project where users can create their own cards; sharing their darkest secrets and posting them to the website without giving their name or any other details. The idea came from director Marcos Siega when searching for inspiration for the video. He performed an internet search of the word "secrets" and came across the PostSecret website. The All-American Rejects agreed with Siega's idea and paid the website to use some of their postcards for the video, with the money going towards The Kristin Brooks Hope Center, a non-profit organization that funds a suicide hotline. After the release of the music video, the band sold the postcards featured on eBay with the proceeds also going towards the Hope Center.

=== Awards ===
Year	Awards ceremony	Award	Results
2006	MuchMusic Video Awards	Best International Group Video	Nominated

== Use in media ==
The song was featured in several video game soundtracks, including Pro Evolution Soccer 2010 and Fortnite, and has been included in movies such as John Tucker Must Die, She's the Man, Bring It On: All or Nothing, and Deuce Bigalow: European Gigolo.

== Track listings ==
CD single
No.	Title	Length
1.	"Dirty Little Secret"	3:14
2.	"Swing, Swing" (Napster acoustic session)	3:09
3.	"Bite Back" (non-LP version)	4:41
4.	"Dirty Little Secret" (music video)	3:13

United Kingdom CD single 1
No.	Title	Length
1.	"Dirty Little Secret"	3:16
2.	"Swing, Swing" (live)	3:23
3.	"Move Along" (live)	3:56
4.	"Dirty Little Secret" (music video)	3:13

United Kingdom CD single 2
No.	Title	Length
1.	"Dirty Little Secret"	3:16
2.	"Dirty Little Secret" (live)	3:09

vinyl 7-inch 1
No.	Title	Length
1.	"Dirty Little Secret" (side A)	3:16
2.	"Bite Back" (side B)	4:39

vinyl 7-inch 2
No.	Title	Length
1.	"Dirty Little Secret" (side A)	3:16
2.	"Swing, Swing" (live) (side B)	3:23

== Charts ==
=== Weekly charts ===
Chart (2005–2006)	Peak position
Australia (ARIA)	73
Canada CHR/Pop Top 30 (Radio & Records)	6
Canada Hot AC Top 30 (Radio & Records)	26
Ireland (IRMA)	47
Scottish Singles Sales (Official Charts)	13
UK Singles (Official Charts)	18
US Billboard Hot 100	9
US Adult Top 40 (Billboard)	15
US Mainstream Top 40 (Billboard)	4
US Pop 100 (Billboard)	4

=== Year-ends charts ===
Chart (2005)	Position
US Modern Rock Tracks (Billboard)	78

Chart (2006)	Position
US Billboard Hot 100	48

== Certifications ==
Region	Certification	Certified units/sales
New Zealand (RMNZ)	2× Platinum	60,000^{‡}
United Kingdom (BPI)	Platinum	600,000^{‡}
United States (RIAA)	6× Platinum	6,000,000^{‡}
^{‡} Sales+streaming figures based on certification alone.

== Release history ==
Region	Date	Format(s)	Label	Ref(s).
United States	June 6, 2005	Alternative radio	Interscope	
United States	July 11, 2005	Contemporary hit radio	Interscope	
United Kingdom	September 12, 2005	7-inch single; CD single	Polydor	
United Kingdom	June 19, 2006 (re-release)	Maxi single	Polydor	
