= Move Along (song) =

2006 single by the All-American Rejects

Single by the All-American Rejects

from the album Move Along
- B-side: "Kiss Yourself Goodbye"
- Released: February 27, 2006
- Recorded: 2005
- Genre: Pop-punk; emo
- Length: 4:02
- Label: Interscope; Doghouse
- Songwriters: Nick Wheeler; Tyson Ritter
- Producer: Howard Benson

The All-American Rejects singles chronology
| "Dirty Little Secret" (2005) | "Move Along" (2006) | "It Ends Tonight" (2006) |

"Move Along" is a song by American rock band the All-American Rejects from their second studio album of the same name. It was released on February 27, 2006, as the second single from the album.

== Background ==
"Move Along" was written by Nick Wheeler and Tyson Ritter. Wheeler explained that the song is "[a]n anti-suicide message song about believing in oneself and persevering in the face of problems".

According to Wheeler, they wrote the song at a time "when we were at our wits' end wondering if we were ever going to get to make a second record. Our manager and our guy just kept saying, 'Keep writing, keep writing.' All we knew was, hey, man, we wrote 11 songs and that's all we had to our name when we made the first record. ... Thankfully [our manager] pushed us to our wits' end, because the last two songs we wrote for our second record were 'Move Along' and 'It Ends Tonight', which were both top ten hits. And it actually became pretty easy writing follow-up hits once the juices started flowing."

== Reception ==
=== Critical reception ===
The song received mostly positive reviews from music critics. Punknews.org referred to the track as an "excellent song" and "The perfect predecessor as their last single 'Dirty Little Secret'", while About.com reviewed "Move Along" as "another slice of catchy pop-rock this time attached to an uplifting, encouraging message. There is little lyrical depth here, but that's not necessarily a bad thing. The All-American Rejects will win no awards for innovation with this single. However, for energetic pop-rock radio fare, 'Move Along' nicely fills the bill".

Contactmusic.com were negative towards the song, saying "'Move Along' unfortunately lacks any originality, it sounds like so many other songs released in the past five years or so. They are a poor man's Green Day—even after listening to the song a few times, it still sounds the same; it doesn't seem to get any better", while Entertainment Weekly commented "The title track launches the band beyond frivolous puppy-love-powered pop. The grinding guitars, pulsing drums, and arena-ready rawk refrain turn 'Move Along' into an anthemic gem that, while seemingly still about girls, is truly something special."

=== Chart performance ===
"Move Along" debuted in the top 50 of the U.S. Billboard Hot 100 and remained there for a total of 39 weeks, eventually reaching the spot of #15. It later reached the top 5 of Billboard's Hot Digital Songs and Hot Adult Top 40 Tracks charts and reached #7 on the Hot Canadian Digital Singles chart. This is the band's most played song on alternative rock radio stations despite not entering the Alternative Songs chart. The modern rock radio station KROQ-FM was the first radio station to play this song along with the other singles from the album.

By March 2009, "Move Along" had sold over two million digital downloads in the United States.

== Music video ==
Three frames in one second from the music video, depicting Ritter in different situations.

The music video for "Move Along" was directed by Marc Webb and edited by JD Smyth and shot in Los Angeles and was released on January 18, 2006. It revolves around the lead singer and bass guitarist Tyson Ritter, going through a series of personal problems (e.g. relationship issues, job stress, losing a football game) as the scene jump-cuts with him standing in the same position while wearing various kinds of clothes and in different locations.

== In popular culture ==
"Move Along" is used in the films She's the Man, The Hitcher, Firehouse Dog and Over Her Dead Body; the video game Rock Band; the American television series One Tree Hill, Last Laugh, WWE Diva Search, WWE SmackDown and American Idol; and commercials for Lego Bionicle's Inika toy sets, Ford, Digi Music Unlimited Music and various short commercials for shows on Cartoon Network.

The song is also used during the transitions of the radio show Wall Street Journal This Morning and in the US Navy's VAW-113 Black Eagles Squadron YouTube video which involved the entire squadron lip-syncing to the song. "Move Along" was also used during the transitions of CBC Television's coverage of the 2008 Summer Olympics and was played at President Barack Obama's Grant Park rally in 2008.

Ken Carson credited the music video of "Move Along" with inspiring the video of his song "Change" (2021).

== Awards ==
| Year | Awards ceremony | Award | Results |
|---|---|---|---|
| 2006 | Fuse Fangoria Chainsaw Awards | Killer Video | Nominated |
| 2006 | MTV Video Music Awards | Best Group Video | Won |
| 2006 | MTV Video Music Awards | Best Editing in a Video | Nominated |
| 2006 | Music Video Production Association Awards | Best Pop Video | Won |
| 2006 | Music Video Production Association Awards | Best Editing | Nominated |
| 2006 | Teen Choice Awards | Choice Music: Rock Track | Nominated |
| 2006 | State Song of Oklahoma Competition | State Rock Song of Oklahoma | Nominated |

== Track listing ==
CD single
| No. | Title | Length |
|---|---|---|
| 1. | "Move Along" | 4:02 |
| 2. | "Kiss Yourself Goodbye" | 3:22 |
| 3. | "Eyelash Wishes" | 4:12 |
| 4. | "Move Along" (music video) | 4:02 |

7" vinyl
| No. | Title | Length |
|---|---|---|
| 1. | "Move Along" (side A) | 4:02 |
| 2. | "Kiss Yourself Goodbye" (side B) | 3:22 |

== Charts ==
=== Weekly charts ===
| Chart (2006) | Peak position |
|---|---|
| Australia (ARIA) | 73 |
| Canada Digital Song Sales (Billboard) | 7 |
| Canada CHR/Pop Top 40 (Radio & Records) | 6 |
| Canada CHR/Top 40 (Billboard) | 15 |
| Canada Hot AC (Billboard) | 19 |
| Scottish Singles Sales (Official Charts) | 39 |
| UK Singles (Official Charts) | 42 |
| US Billboard Hot 100 | 15 |
| US Digital Song Sales (Billboard) | 5 |
| US Adult Top 40 (Billboard) | 4 |
| US Mainstream Top 40 (Billboard) | 9 |
| US Billboard Pop 100 | 12 |

| Chart (2007) | Peak position |
|---|---|
| Canada (Canadian Hot 100) | 97 |

=== Year-end charts ===
| Chart (2006) | Position |
|---|---|
| US Billboard Hot 100 | 21 |
| US Adult Pop Songs (Billboard) | 14 |

== Certifications ==
| Region | Certification | Certified units/sales |
|---|---|---|
| New Zealand (RMNZ) | Platinum | 30,000^{‡} |
| United Kingdom (BPI) | Silver | 200,000^{‡} |
^{‡} Sales+streaming figures based on certification alone.

== Release history ==
| Region | Date | Format | Label(s) | Ref. |
|---|---|---|---|---|
| United States | February 27, 2006 | Contemporary hit radio | Interscope; Doghouse | |
| Australia | August 14, 2006 | CD single | Interscope; Doghouse | |
