= The All-American Rejects =

American rock band

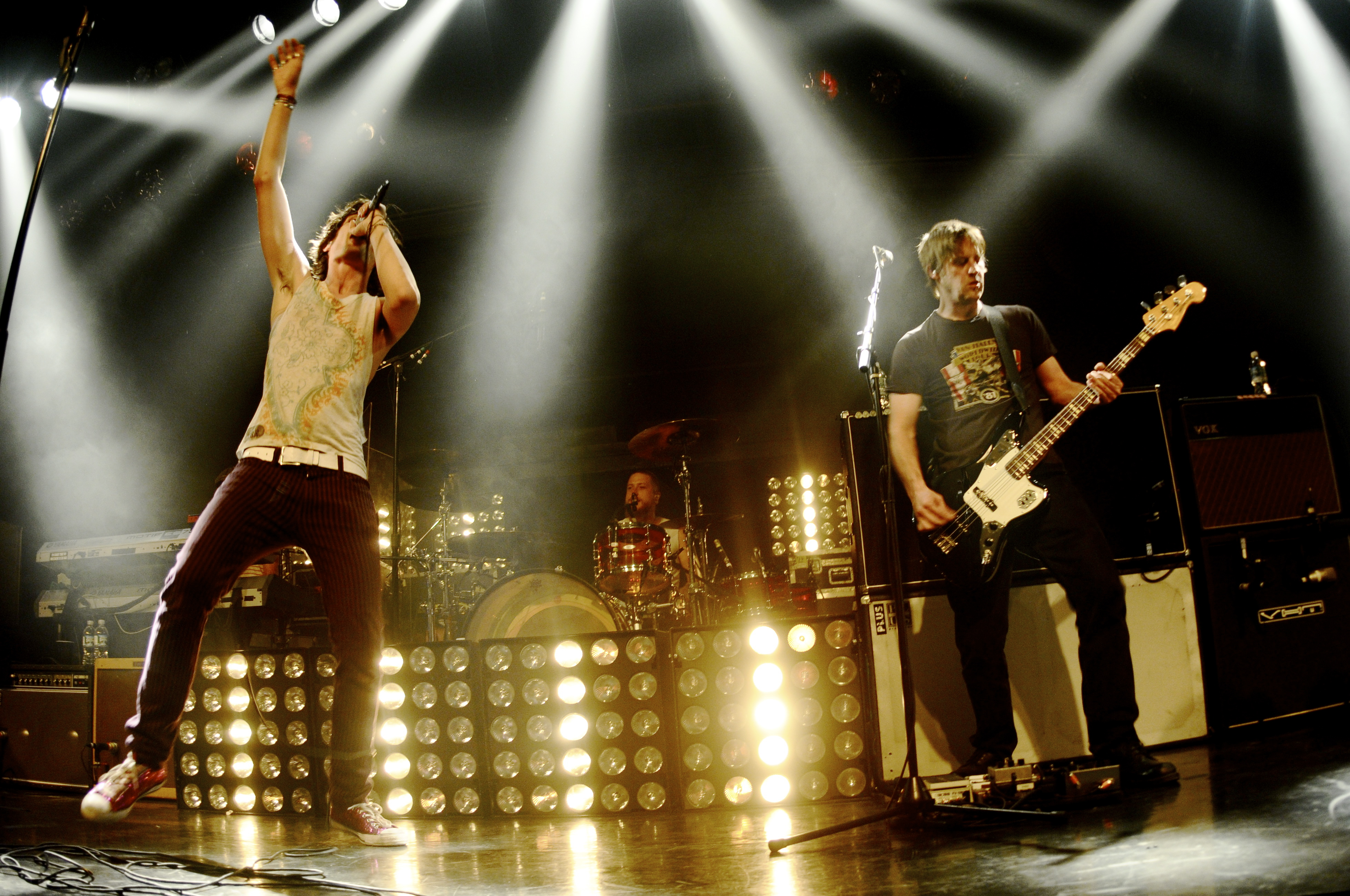
- The All-American Rejects performing at the Hampton Casino Ballroom in 2007

Background information
- Origin: Stillwater, Oklahoma, U.S.
- Genres: Pop-punk; power pop; alternative rock; pop rock; emo pop
- Years active: 1999–present
- Labels: Epitaph; Doghouse; DreamWorks; DGC; Interscope
- Members: Tyson Ritter; Nick Wheeler; Mike Kennerty; Chris Gaylor
- Past members: Jesse Tabish; Tim Campbell
- Website: allamericanrejects.com

The All-American Rejects (often abbreviated as AAR) are an American rock band formed in Stillwater, Oklahoma, in 1999. The band consists of lead vocalist and bassist Tyson Ritter, lead guitarist and backing vocalist Nick Wheeler, rhythm guitarist and backing vocalist Mike Kennerty, and drummer Chris Gaylor. Wheeler and Ritter serve as the band's songwriters; Wheeler is the primary composer and Ritter is the primary lyricist. Although Kennerty and Gaylor are not founding members, they have appeared in all of the band's music videos and on all studio releases except for the band's self-titled debut.

The group achieved mainstream success with their debut self-titled studio album The All-American Rejects, released in 2002 on the DreamWorks Records label. The album was certified platinum by the Recording Industry Association of America (RIAA) and spawned the successful single "Swing, Swing". The band's second studio album Move Along brought the group further mainstream success in 2005, producing the hit singles "Dirty Little Secret", "Move Along", and "It Ends Tonight", all of which charted in the top fifteen on the Billboard Hot 100 chart, while Move Along was certified triple platinum in 2024 by the RIAA. Their third studio album When the World Comes Down was released in 2008 and was later certified platinum in 2024 by the RIAA. Its lead single "Gives You Hell" became The All-American Rejects' most successful song to date, peaking at number 4 on the Billboard Hot 100 chart and the top 5 in many other countries. "Gives You Hell" was certified Diamond for sales of over ten million shipments in the United States by the RIAA in 2026. Kids in the Street, the band's fourth studio album, was released on March 26, 2012, and debuted at number 18 on the US Billboard 200. On October 30, 2015, the group released a new single named "There's a Place".

The All-American Rejects have sold over 12 million albums worldwide. They were ranked No. 73 on the "Hot 100 Artists of the 2000s" and No. 183 on the "Billboard 200 Artists of the Decade" list. The band has continued to tour, and released the singles "Sweat" on July 7, 2017, and "Send Her to Heaven" on their new label Epitaph on July 16, 2019. On March 22, 2025, their fifth studio album, Sandbox was announced; it was ultimately released on May 15, 2026.

== History ==
=== 1999–2004: Formation and The All-American Rejects ===
The band formed in Stillwater, Oklahoma in 1999 while members Nick Wheeler and Tyson Ritter were still in high school. It was here that Ritter offered himself for bass duties. Eventually Wheeler and Ritter decided to form the All-American Rejects. When asked where the name of the band came from, Mike Kennerty says, "It was a random name that sounded cool. I feel like we have grown into it over the years."

In 2000, while still in high school, the group made a demo simply labeled The All-American Rejects, with Nick Wheeler (drums), Tyson Ritter (vocals, bass), and Jesse Tabish (guitar, vocals). The demo CD was engineered, mixed and mastered by Wheeler. It was also managed by Alisa Ben at Half-A-Cup Entertainment. The demo is now commonly referred to as The Blue Disc or The Blue Album. The CD consisted of twelve songs, a few of which would be included on the Same Girl, New Songs demo made in 2001. Jesse Tabish later split from the group and later became a member of the folk band Other Lives. Ritter and Wheeler put together the Same Girl, New Songs EP, which was soon sent to independent Doghouse Records, where an intern saved the disc from the trash, and revealed it to the label owner. The All-American Rejects were soon signed to a recording contract.

In 2001, with producer Tim O'Heir, the band recorded their self-titled debut studio album, The All-American Rejects. The album and its first single, "Swing, Swing", were released towards the end of 2002. The group began looking for additional members for a live act. Edmond, Oklahoma resident Mike Kennerty joined on as rhythm guitarist soon before the album was released. Soon after, the band was having problems with drummer Tim Campbell. Campbell was later replaced by drummer Chris Gaylor, who played drums for Euclid Crash and Kennerty.

The group was then signed by DreamWorks Records, a subsidiary of film company DreamWorks Pictures (also known as DreamWorks SKG). The band hit the road for eight shows in January, and DreamWorks issued a broader-scale distribution of the debut LP. The album peaked at No. 25 on the Billboard 200 Album chart. The single "Swing, Swing" was also re-issued, which peaked on the Billboard Hot 100 at No. 60 as well as No. 8 on the Billboard Modern Rock Tracks chart. The single "The Last Song" was also released spring 2003, and climbed to No. 29 on the Billboard Modern Rock Tracks chart.

Early in 2003, the band went on tour as an opening act for CKY. While several differing stories have occurred concerning the tour, they were kicked off the tour shortly after it began.

In Spring 2003, the All-American Rejects set out on their first headlining tour, called the Too Bad for Hell Tour. In later 2003, the All-American Rejects released, Live from Oklahoma... The Too Bad for Hell DVD!, their first live DVD – which was later certified Gold by the RIAA. During this time, they performed on the Vans Warped Tour. They would later be part of the lineup again in summer 2005. In November, the All-American Rejects joined the bands Motion City Soundtrack and Limbeck for six shows in the United Kingdom, the first date on the 16th, and the last on the 22nd.

In November 2003, Universal Music Group (UMG) agreed to purchase DreamWorks Records from DreamWorks Pictures for roughly $100 million. The label was eventually shut down in January 2005, and during 2004, many DreamWorks artists were reassigned to different labels at UMG.

=== 2005–06: Move Along ===
In July 2005, the All-American Rejects released their second studio album, Move Along, produced by Howard Benson. It was released via UMG's Interscope Records, and the album's first single, "Dirty Little Secret", was released that summer to radio stations.

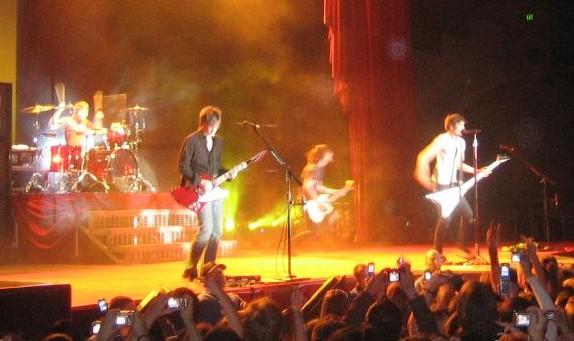
The All-American Rejects performing on December 4, 2006

At the end of 2005, the All-American Rejects embarked on The Rise of the Fall Tour along with The Academy Is... and Rooney. Then, on December 13, The Bite Back EP was released on the iTunes Music Store, and on New Year's Eve 2005, the band performed The Cars' "Good Times Roll" with Fall Out Boy on MTV.

In 2006, the second single and title track from Move Along was released. Within the first weeks after premiering their video, it had been on the Total Request Live countdown, hitting number-one four days in a row. The single did not chart on the Billboard Hot 100 until almost six months after its release, in June. On March 15, 2006, the All-American Rejects began a tour of the United States that wrapped up on May 13, 2006. On May 25, the All-American Rejects performed at the first ever VH1 Rock Honors, covering "Photograph" by Def Leppard. In July the band sent a promotional single from Move Along, "Top of the World", to modern rock radio. A music video was created for it from clips of the All-American Rejects on tour and in concert.

"Move Along" was also used to help promote the Lego Bionicle Inika toy sets in the summer of 2006. The group also participated in a promotion for the sets called "Free the Band". The overall priority of the promotion was that the Rejects got kidnapped by the villainous Piraka whilst sailing on a yacht and people had to assist the Inika on finding and rescuing the band via the website freetheband.com. A competition could also be entered where the winners would receive Bionicle and All-American Rejects merchandise alike. That same year, "Move Along" was featured in the film She's the Man, which was released by former DreamWorks Records owner DreamWorks Pictures.

In September 2006, a third headlining single, "It Ends Tonight", was released from Move Along. The video debuted at No. 10 on the VH1 Top 20 countdown. The video also peaked at No. 2 on TRL. Later in the year the All-American Rejects launched the Tournado tour in support of Move Along. The tour kicked off at Hartford, Connecticut on October 27, and wrapped up at Champaign, Illinois on December 20.

That New Year's Eve, the All-American Rejects performed on a special on Las Vegas' Fremont Street, which also included the bands OK Go, Five for Fighting, Rock Star Supernova, and Chicago.

On December 21, 2024, the album hit 1 Billion streams on Spotify.

=== 2007–09: When the World Comes Down ===
The All-American Rejects began writing material for their third studio album in December 2006. The band also collaborated with composer Danny Elfman on "The Future Has Arrived", which was included on the soundtrack of Disney film Meet the Robinsons. The song was created in conjunction with the film's musical score.

On July 17, 2007, the All-American Rejects released their second live DVD, titled Tournado, with content from the 2006 headlining tour of the same name. Also during the summer, they covered "Jack's Lament" from The Nightmare Before Christmas, which was featured on Nightmare Revisited. The finished album version of the song "I Wanna" appeared in the movie, The House Bunny, which was released to theaters on August 22, 2008. Vocalist/bassist Tyson Ritter played a role in the film, and offered up "I Wanna" for the soundtrack.

On September 30, 2008, the first single from When the World Comes Down, "Gives You Hell" was released. The All-American Rejects were inducted into the Oklahoma Music Hall of Fame, and were awarded with "Rising Star". "Gives You Hell" peaked at No. 1 on the Billboard Pop Songs chart, was the No. 5 most downloaded song of the 2009 year, was certified Diamond by RIAA, and was the No. 1 most played song of the year 2009.

The music video for "Gives You Hell" was released November fifth and reached number one on VH1's Top 20 Countdown. On the sixth, in support of "Gives You Hell", the band started the Gives You Hell Tour, which hit many small venues and clubs. Then, on the eighteenth "Mona Lisa (When the World Comes Down)", another song from the band's upcoming album, was released digitally on iTunes. In the first week of December, the album version of "Real World" was made available for download on Rock Band for the Xbox 360 and the PlayStation 3.

Three years after the Move Along album was issued, the group released their third studio album, When the World Comes Down (produced by Eric Valentine), on December 16, 2008. After the Gives You Hell Tour wrapped up, the band embarked on a world tour until coming back to the states to start the I Wanna Rock Tour, which hit many major venues in the United States.

In May 2009, the All-American Rejects released a second single in the United States, entitled "The Wind Blows", which achieved moderate success. "I Wanna" was released internationally on July 8 to Australia and the United Kingdom. Another song from When the World Comes Down. In July, "Real World" was released as a promotional single in the United States, followed by "I Wanna" as a headliner. In late summer the All-American Rejects joined Weezer, Fall Out Boy and Taking Back Sunday for the second half of the Blink-182 Reunion Tour. On August 15, the All-American Rejects made history, performing alongside Hoobastank, Raygun, Boys Like Girls, Pixie Lott and Kasabian as one of the live acts at Asia's very first MTV World Stage Live In Malaysia concert. This performance gained them recognition in Malaysia. When the World Comes Down soon sold over 15,000 digital and physical copies in the country. On August 21 the "I Wanna" single was issued to Austria and Germany.

In October 2009, the All-American Rejects were forced to cancel shows due to an injury to frontman Tyson Ritter. He performed from a wheelchair with his leg in a brace on September 27 during a show in Tampa, Florida, amid reports suggesting the singer had undergone knee surgery to remove a tumor that had been there for many months. Ritter's leg became infected, and he remained hospitalized for five days. Ritter made a full recovery in time to return to kick off the Battle Of The Bands Tour with Taking Back Sunday, with the first date at MSU in Michigan. At the end of 2009, Ritter suffered from alcohol abuse after ending a six-year relationship. Ritter's way of coping with this issue was to write and record music for the band's next album, Kids In The Street.

The All-American Rejects announced that they would be performing their last show in support of When the World Comes Down in Hollywood, California on December 14. Since the date soon sold out, the band added a second date at the venue for the next day. However, the group played one more show at the "Jingle Bell Bash" in Seattle, Washington on December 19.

=== 2010–13: Kids in the Street ===
In February 2010, the All-American Rejects performed live at the Vancouver Winter Olympic Games at the Whistler Medals Plaza. They also had DirecTV performances at Super Bowl XLIV and a special set aired in February. The band also wrote and recorded the song "The Poison" for the Almost Alice compilation, a collection of songs representing the 2010 Tim Burton film Alice in Wonderland. From June 25 to July 18, the All-American Rejects toured the United States and Canada as part of the Warped Tour 2010 festival.

Later that year, the band announced that they were working on a fourth studio album, which was planned to be released in early 2012. Songwriters Nick Wheeler and Tyson Ritter went on numerous writing retreats into secluded parts of the United States; a tradition of writing used on their previously released albums. Recording for the album wrapped up in June 2011, with mixing commencing the following August and concluding early September. On November 14, 2011, Ritter announced that ex Taking Back Sunday bassist Matt Rubano had joined the band as their bass player for live performances, but stated that Ritter is still the bass player recording-wise.

On December 3, 2011, the group announced that the album would be titled Kids in the Street and released the song "Someday's Gone" from the album as a free download from their official website, a music video for the track that was filmed over the previous weekend also premiered the same day. The band later announced the track listing for the album on December 16, 2011, and that its first single would be titled "Beekeeper's Daughter", it premiered in an episode of American teen drama 90210 featuring the band performing the track on January 31, 2012, as well as being released the same day. The album spawned two further singles; "Kids in the Street" and "Heartbeat Slowing Down", both of which achieved little success in the US.

The All-American Rejects later embarked on their Shaking Off the Rust tour, which began in San Luis Obispo, California, United States on January 18, 2012, and continued through the year – some of which they performed as a support act for Blink-182's 20th Anniversary Tour in the UK – and ended on July 27, 2013. The band performed at Sepang International Center in Kuala Lumpur, Malaysia on September 27, 2013, alongside The Wanted and Five for Fighting as part of the Arthur's Day celebrations promoted by the Guinness brewing company. On November 5, 2013, Ritter released a solo song titled "Air" in order to "tide fans over until the next Rejects record", which Ritter claimed "it's time to start fishing for hooks for", while in an interview with Variance magazine.

=== 2013–2024: Unofficial hiatus and other projects ===
The band headlined the Slam Dunk festival tour in the UK on the Bank Holiday weekend of May 2014, alongside other bands such as Goldfinger, Letlive, We the Kings and Zebrahead. Following occasional performances of touring for 18 months and a concert with Musikfest, Wheeler announced in an interview with the former that the band plans to begin recording for their fifth studio album in the fall of 2013. He went on to describe the intended creative process as "in the moment", saying they plan to write as well as record new material in the studio rather than write in advance.

The group performed at Universal Studios Orlando annual Mardi Gras event, Wabash College, and Manhattan College in the spring of 2015. A new song by the band titled "There's a Place" is featured in the trailer for the 2015 film Miss You Already, in which Ritter also stars. The song and its music video were released on October 30, 2015. On July 21, 2016, Tyson Ritter announced a new single from the band, entitled "DGAF". The song was performed live for the first time that night, which also marked the start of the band's tour with Blink-182. The band performed at Emo Nite LA's 2nd anniversary at the Echoplex in Los Angeles, California in December 2016.

On April 1, 2017, Tyson Ritter announced a new single from the band due out that summer, entitled "Sweat". On June 13 the band officially announced the song via social media. They released their two-song EP, "Sweat" and "Close Your Eyes" on July 7, 2017. The All-American Rejects have written and recorded about 10 new songs as of June 2017. The band toured in the summer and fall of 2017, playing both new singles. Although the band is keeping quiet about the songs and album name, Ritter said in an interview with grammy.com that the next two songs to be released would be "Send Her To Heaven" (a song played on the 2017 summer/fall tour) and "Demons". "Sweat" charted at number 21 on the Hot Rock Songs chart, number 10 on Digital Rock songs chart, and later charted at 29 on the Billboard Adult Pop Songs chart, in the month of October.

On February 8, 2018, Tyson Ritter said that the band was no longer signed to Interscope Records, saying that the band intended to release music "without all the politics that come into play when signed to a major label", citing the process of the label paying top-40 stations to play their music as not for them, and not what music is about.

It was later announced on July 10, 2019, that Epitaph Records had signed the band. On the following July 16, The All-American Rejects released the 3-track single "Send Her to Heaven", followed by its music video. The band later released the single "Me Vs. The World" on November 20, 2020, stating that all of its proceeds would be donated to the MusiCares COVID-19 Relief Fund which aims to support employees in the music industry who have been out of work since the start of the COVID-19 pandemic.

On August 21, 2020, the band released a 14 song collection to Spotify titled 'Rejects Faves' that contains band-picked favorites from their four studio albums.

On November 30, 2020, when asked if the band would be releasing new material in an interview with Radio.com, Tyson Ritter stated that "it's not likely that the band is going to make another record anytime soon if ever, it's given birth to these other projects that I've started." He also quoted Joni Mitchell, adding that "as an artist or as a songwriter you need to know when to stop."

On January 18, 2022, The All-American Rejects were announced as part of the When We Were Young Festival with headliners Paramore and My Chemical Romance. The festival took place in October 2022 and had three dates. The band were set to return for the 2024 event, but backed out on October 11 due to "management change".

On August 2, 2024, the band headlined the Dearborn Homecoming Festival in Dearborn, Michigan, a suburb of Detroit. They co-headlined with The Verve Pipe.

On August 30, 2024, they teased a new song to be released the following September 13, but did not reveal the title. It was then revealed to be a cover of "Flagpole Sitta" by Harvey Danger.

=== 2025–present: Sandbox ===
On March 22, 2025, the band announced a new album, Sandbox, with the title track being released as the lead single on April 24. In May 2025, the band went viral playing a series of pop-up "House Party Tour" shows. The band played at a bowling alley, a barn, and on college campuses throughout the Midwest. The album's second single, "Easy Come, Easy Go", was released along with a music video on June 4, 2025. On July 22, 2025, "Easy Come, Easy Go" debuted at 37 on the Alternative Airplay chart, their first song to enter this chart since 2009. In August 2025, the band began hosting pop-up signings for a limited tour edition of their vinyl release, Sandbox, confirming that the full album was scheduled for release in February 2026, which was delayed until May 15th, 2026.

Later that year, the band announced that they – alongside Boys Like Girls – would be opening for the Jonas Brothers on their Jonas20: Greetings from Your Hometown Tour of North America, began in August 2025. They were intended to be an opening act consistently starting in October, but announced on November 9 that they'd be pulling out of the rest of the tour dates due to Ritter needing vocal rest.

On May 15, 2026, the band released their album Sandbox on streaming, digital download, and CD. The album is their first record in 14 years.

== Musical style and legacy ==
The staff of Consequence ranked the band at number 61 on their list of "The 100 Best Pop Punk Bands" in 2019. In 2021, Paris Fawcett of Louder wrote: "The All-American Rejects were emo masked as radio rock, and it made them unstoppably popular for about two years. In this time they penned two platinum records, developed a vice grip over high school movie soundtracks and quickly became poster boys for a style of punk so wet that it made Blink-182 look like Black Flag."

== Band members ==
Current members

- Tyson Ritter – lead vocals, bass, ukulele (1999–present), keyboards, programming (2008–present), guitar (2025–present; in-studio only)
- Nick Wheeler – guitar, keyboards, programming, backing vocals (2001–present), drums, percussion (1999–2001)
- Mike Kennerty – guitar, backing vocals (2002–present)
- Chris Gaylor – drums, percussion (2002–present), backing vocals (2025–present)

Current touring musicians

- Sebastian Tenorio-Vallejo – keyboards, piano, bass, guitar, saxophone, percussion, backing vocals (2024–present)

Former members

- Jesse Tabish – lead vocals, guitar (1999–2001)
- Tim Campbell – drums, percussion (2001–2002)

Former touring musicians

- Timothy Jordan II – keyboards, piano, guitar, percussion, backing vocals (2005; died 2005)
- Nick Foxer – keyboards, piano, guitar, backing vocals (2006)
- Butch Walker – bass, backing vocals (2006)
- Kevin Saulnier – keyboards, piano, guitar, percussion, backing vocals (2006–2011)
- Ethan Novak – bass, guitar, backing vocals (2009–2011)
- Mike Shawcross – percussion, backing vocals (2011–2013)
- Matt Rubano – bass, keyboards, piano, guitar, backing vocals (2011–2016)
- Scott Chesak – keyboards, piano, guitar, percussion, backing vocals (2011–2024), bass (2014–2024), saxophone (2023–2024)

== Equipment ==
Using mainly Fender and Gibson guitars, the All-American Rejects use numerous models. The band uses Sennheiser microphones, Dean Markley Custom Lights guitar strings, and Dunlop Picks.

Lead vocalist/bassist Tyson Ritter uses two models of Fender; one is a Black Precision Bass, and the other model is the then-discontinued Jaguar Bass. Ritter also uses Gibson models, including the Gibson Thunderbird and the Epiphone Flying V.

Lead guitarist Nick Wheeler, primarily uses Gibson guitars. Wheeler's main guitar is the Gibson Firebird. He primarily uses a Vintage Sunburst Firebird V. Wheeler owns a rare cherry Firebird VII, which he no longer uses for live shows, as well as a custom Firebird, which is painted in blue glitter. He owns eight Firebirds overall. He also uses a Classic Gibson Firebird. Wheeler frequently uses a Gibson ES-335. This guitar is notably used live for the intro of "Top of the World", taking the place of the classical guitar originally used in the "Top of the World" recording. It is also commonly used in the songs "It Ends Tonight", "Real World", "Stab My Back", "My Paper Heart", "Gives You Hell" and "Dance Inside". Another guitar that Wheeler favors is the Gibson EDS-1275 doubleneck guitar, which he uses live on "The Wind Blows", "Back to Me", and "Bleed Into Your Mind". He has also been known to occasionally use the Gibson Flying V, namely for the performing "The Last Song" live.

Rhythm guitarist Mike Kennerty has used the Gibson SG since joining the band, and also uses Washburn Guitars. Another guitar that Kennerty favors is the PRS Guitars Mira X which came out in early 2009.

Chris Gaylor, drummer for the band, uses Remo heads for his drums. Gaylor used to endorse Tama drums, but now he endorses C&C drums. He has a set with a Rootbeer Sparkle wood finish, as well as an acrylic kit. Gaylor's most-current set-up contains seven drums. He uses a 12×7 rack tom, 14×10, 16×12, and 18×14 floor toms, a 14×6.5 Nickel-Over-Brass snare, a 12×7 effects snare, and a 24×16 bass drum. Gaylor uses Tama hardware.

Also, Gaylor uses Vater Universal drumsticks, and his cymbals are Sabian. His hi-hats are Sabian 14-inch HHX Evolution. His 3 crashes he uses are an 18-inch HHXplosion crash, a 19-inch AAXplosion crash, and a 20-inch HHX stage crash. Gaylor also uses 22-inch HH Power Bell ride cymbal. Gaylor also includes an LP cowbell in his set. He also uses an Alesis ADAT HD24 for recording purposes.

== Discography ==
- The All-American Rejects (2002)
- Move Along (2005)
- When the World Comes Down (2008)
- Kids in the Street (2012)
- Sandbox (2026)
