= Move Along =

Studio album by The All-American Rejects
- Released: July 12, 2005
- Recorded: December 2004
- Studios: Bay 7 (Valley Village, California); Sparky Dark (Calabasas, California)
- Genres: Pop-punk; power pop; emo pop
- Length: 42:09
- Labels: Interscope; Doghouse
- Producer: Howard Benson

The All-American Rejects chronology
The All-American Rejects (2002)	Move Along (2005)	When the World Comes Down (2008)

Singles from Move Along
- 1. "Dirty Little Secret" Released: June 6, 2005; 2. "Move Along" Released: February 27, 2006; 3. "It Ends Tonight" Released: September 19, 2006

Move Along is the second studio album by the American rock band the All-American Rejects, released on July 12, 2005, by Interscope Records. It spawned three top 15 singles, which helped the album ship 3 million units to be certified triple platinum by the RIAA. It is the first album to feature guitarist Mike Kennerty and drummer Chris Gaylor, making it their first to be recorded as a full band.

== Production ==
The All-American Rejects began writing new material for their second album in the fall of 2003, with the song "Dance Inside" being the first written and performed by the band during their then-current tour. After the end of their tour, the band's songwriters Tyson Ritter and Nick Wheeler spent the majority of 2004 writing more new material in their homes in Destin, Florida.

Production for the album took place in Burbank, California the following December, taking a majority of seven weeks to record. Sessions were held at Bay 7 Studios in Valley Village, California, and Sparky Dark Studio in Calabasas, California; Casey Stone recorded strings at Sunset Sound in Hollywood, California. Howard Benson acted as producer, with Mike Plotnikoff handling the recording. Hatsukazu Inagaki was the assistant engineer, with Paul Decarli doing Pro Tools editing. The songs recorded were then mixed in March 2005 by Chris Lord-Alge at Resonate Music in Burbank. Ted Jensen mastered the album at Sterling Sound in New York City.

== Release ==
Between March and May 2005, the All-American Rejects embarked on a headlining US tour; the first half of it was supported by Number One Fan and Action Action, while Armor for Sleep and Hellogoodbye featured on the second half. The trek also included an appearance at that year's The Bamboozle festival. The album's lead single "Dirty Little Secret" was released June 6, 2005. A music video followed its release on July 11. The band appeared on the 2005 Warped Tour in June and July; around this time, they were accompanied by touring keyboardist Tim Jordan. Move Along was made available for streaming on July 10, 2005, before being released two days later through DGC, Doghouse, and Interscope.

The music video for "Move Along" was posted on MTV's website on January 12, 2006, which was directed by Marc Webb. It was released as the second single on February 27, 2006, but did not chart until the following summer. From March to May 2006, the group toured with Fall Out Boy on their North American arena tour, titled the Black Clouds and Underdogs Tour. Preceded by another appearance at The Bamboozle festival, the band went on a tour of North America in June and July 2006, with support from Damone. The band were forced to cancel the Canadian dates of this tour due to Ritter having vocal issues.

Also in July, "Top of the World" was released as a promotional single in the United States; a music video made up of videos and photographs taken by the band while on tour was released to help promote it. A music video was released for "It Ends Tonight" on August 28. In September, the band went on a tour of the UK. On September 19, "It Ends Tonight" was released as the final single from Move Along. In October, went on a tour of American colleges with support from Ima Robot. For the majority of October 2006, the band went on a US West Coast tour with support from Ima Robot. From late October to mid December, the band went on the Tournado 2006 tour with support from the Format, Gym Class Heroes, the Starting Line and Motion City Soundtrack. On January 16, 2007, the band appeared on The Tonight Show with Jay Leno. They released their second video album, Tournado, consisting of footage from the tour of the same name, in July 2007.

== Reception ==
Professional ratings
Review scores
Source	Rating
About.com	3.5/5 stars
AbsolutePunk	71%
AllMusic	2.5/5 stars
Blender	3/5 stars
Entertainment Weekly	B+
IGN	6.8/10
musicOMH	(unfavorable)
Plugged In (publication)	(positive)
Prefix Magazine	(6/10)
Rolling Stone	3/5 stars
Spin	B
USA Today	3/4 stars

=== Critical reception ===
Move Along received positive reviews from music critics. Blender rated the album 3 out of 5 stars whilst Entertainment Weekly scored it a B+.

AbsolutePunk gave the album a 71% positive rating, reviewing with "The All-American Rejects have opted for a more direct rock and roll sound by somewhat changing their instrumentation and abandoning what made them so fun in the first place. Nevertheless, the band does sound very good: singer Tyson Ritter sounds better than ever, both in terms of melody as well in clarity of delivery, and the ridiculous production allows for each of the countless layers of guitars to shine through the extremely clear, yet thick sounding drums", while AllMusic commented "The All-American Rejects' effervescent 2003 hit "Swing Swing" sounded like a pop-punk adaptation of Better Than Ezra, and their sophomore effort makes this mix even more apparent", and that "The Rejects rock out a little on "Night Drive", "Dirty Little Secret", and "I'm Waiting"; the guitars crackle anxiously, and Tyson Ritter and Nick Wheeler's breathy harmonies soar like they mean it.

antiMusic gave it a score of 4.5 out of 5 stars and said, "These guys have got the art of the hook down so well that you have no choice but to submit to their wills."

IGN reviewed Move Along saying "[The album] is made for the masses, with each song as sexed up for the radio as the next. Full of isolation, break ups, and other run-of-the-mill pop topics, Move Along never really questions straying from the path." Prefix Magazine gave it a score of six out of ten, regarding the lyrics "too feel-good to be effective or memorable", but praised the track "11:11 P.M." as a "fast-moving song about last mistakes and other inoffensive high school diary entries, comes complete with fist-pumping chorus and ticking-clock sound effects."

=== Commercial performance and accolades ===
Move Along debuted at No. 6 on the Billboard 200 with 90,000 first week sales. It spent 84 weeks inside the top 100 of the chart. The album was later certified 3× Platinum by the RIAA for the shipment of 3 million copies. "Dirty Little Secret" peaked at #9 on the Billboard Hot 100 in the United States as well as #4 on both the Pop 100 and Mainstream Top 40 charts respectively. "Move Along" charted at #15 on the Billboard Hot 100 and the top 10 on the Hot Canadian Digital Singles Chart, "It Ends Tonight" reached a peak position of #8 on both the US Billboard Hot 100 and Mainstream Top 40. By August 2006, the album had sold over 2,300,000 copies.

Cleveland.com ranked "Dirty Little Secret" at #40 on their list of the top 100 pop-punk songs. Alternative Press ranked "Dirty Little Secret" at #68 and "Move Along" at #25 on their list of the best 100 singles from the 2000s.

== Track listing ==
All songs written by Tyson Ritter and Nick Wheeler.

No.	Title	Length
1.	"Dirty Little Secret"	3:13
2.	"Stab My Back"	3:10
3.	"Move Along"	4:00
4.	"It Ends Tonight"	4:04
5.	"Change Your Mind"	3:40
6.	"Night Drive"	3:24
7.	"11:11 P.M."	3:04
8.	"Dance Inside"	4:00
9.	"Top of the World"	3:25
10.	"Straitjacket Feeling"	3:37
11.	"I'm Waiting"	3:34
12.	"Can't Take It"	2:52
Total length:		42:09

International bonus track
No.	Title	Length
13.	"Night Drive" (acoustic)	3:48
Total length:		45:57

Japanese bonus tracks
No.	Title	Length
13.	"Eyelash Wishes"	4:09
14.	"Kiss Yourself Goodbye"	3:23
Total length:		49:47

United Kingdom bonus track
No.	Title	Length
13.	"Eyelash Wishes"	4:09
Total length:		46:18

iTunes/Spotify deluxe edition bonus tracks
No.	Title	Length
13.	"Dirty Little Secret" (live at the Wiltern)	3:09
14.	"Top of the World" (live at the Wiltern)	3:27
15.	"Night Drive" (live at the Wiltern)	3:34
16.	"It Ends Tonight" (live at the Wiltern)	4:00
17.	"Move Along" (live at the Wiltern)	4:14
Total length:		59:33

Limited deluxe edition bonus tracks
No.	Title	Length
13.	"Kiss Yourself Goodbye"	3:22
14.	"Bite Back"	4:38
15.	"Eyelash Wishes" (non-lp version)	4:11
Total length:		54:25

== Personnel ==
Personnel per booklet.

The All-American Rejects

- Tyson Ritter – lead and backing vocals, bass, theremin (track 2), claps & stomps (track 6), gang vocals (track 6)
- Nick Wheeler – guitar, keyboards, programming, banjo and electric sitar (track 6), claps & stomps (track 6), gang vocals (track 6), classical guitar (track 9)
- Mike Kennerty – guitar, gang vocals (track 6), claps & stomps (track 6)
- Chris Gaylor – drums, additional percussion, claps & stomps (track 6), gang vocals (track 6)

Additional musicians

- Howard Benson – keyboards, programming, claps & stomps (track 6)
- Paul Decarli – keyboards, programming
- Deborah Lurie – string arranger, conductor
- Lenny Castro – percussion
- Jamie Muhoberac – piano (tracks 3, 4, 10 and 12)
- Bobbi Page – choir (track 3)
- Benjamin Byram – choir (track 3)
- Nicolas Harper – choir (track 3)
- Emily Logan – choir (track 3)
- Michael Mayo – choir (track 3)
- Zoe Merrill – choir (track 3)
- Haeley Moore – choir (track 3)
- Aaron Page – choir (track 3)
- Chris Allen – claps (track 6), stomps (track 6)
- Keith Nelson – claps (track 6), stomps (track 6)
- Dee Anderson – claps (track 6), stomps (track 6)

Production and design

- Howard Benson – producer
- Mike Plotnikoff – recording
- Chris Lord-Alge – mixing
- Hatsukazu Inagaki – assistant engineer
- Paul Decarli – Pro Tools editing
- Casey Stone – strings recording
- Ted Jensen – mastering
- Chris Bilheimer – art direction
- Chapman Baehlerlol – photography

== Charts ==
=== Weekly charts ===
Weekly chart performance for Move Along
Chart (2005–07)	Peak position
Canadian Albums (Billboard)	19
New Zealand Albums (RMNZ)	31
UK Albums (Official Charts)	45
US Billboard 200	6
US Top Rock Albums (Billboard)	6

=== Year-end charts ===
2005 year-end chart performance for Move Along
Chart (2005)	Position
US Billboard 200	144

2006 year-end chart performance for Move Along
Chart (2006)	Position
US Billboard 200	53
US Top Rock Albums (Billboard)	11

== Certifications ==
Certifications and sales for Move Along
Region	Certification	Certified units/sales
Canada (Music Canada)	Platinum	100,000^{^}
New Zealand (RMNZ)	Gold	7,500^{‡}
United Kingdom (BPI)	Gold	100,000^{*}
United States (RIAA)	3× Platinum	3,000,000^{‡}
^{*} Sales figures based on certification alone.^{^} Shipments figures based on certification alone.^{‡} Sales+streaming figures based on certification alone.

== Release history ==
Release dates and formats for Move Along
Country	Date	Format	Label
United Kingdom	July 11, 2005	CD; DL	Polydor
United States	July 12, 2005	CD; DL	Interscope
Australia	September 5, 2005	CD; DL	Interscope
New Zealand	September 5, 2005	CD; DL	Interscope
United States	November 16, 2005	LP	Interscope
United Kingdom	November 13, 2006	LP	Polydor
