= Tyson Ritter =

American musician and actor (born 1984)

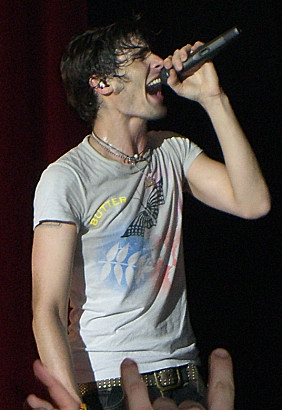
- Ritter performing with The All-American Rejects in 2006

Background information
- Born: Tyson Jay Ritter; April 24, 1984 (age 42); Stillwater, Oklahoma, U.S.
- Genres: Alternative rock; pop-punk; power pop; pop rock
- Occupations: Singer; musician; songwriter; actor
- Instruments: Vocals; bass guitar; keyboards; guitar
- Years active: 1997–present
- Member of: The All-American Rejects
- Spouse: Elena Satine (m. 2013)

Tyson Jay Ritter (born April 24, 1984) is an American musician, singer, songwriter and actor. He is the co-founder, frontman, bassist, and primary lyricist of the rock band The All-American Rejects. As an actor, Ritter appeared as himself on the seventeenth episode of season three in the Fox drama series House, which aired in April 2007; appeared as Dane on Amazon Video's Betas; recurred as rock musician Oliver Rome in the NBC drama series Parenthood; and has had supporting roles in multiple films, including The House Bunny (2008) and Miss You Already (2015). In 2018, Ritter played recurring characters on two television series on AMC, Preacher and Lodge 49. Ritter joined the main cast of Preacher for its final season in 2019.

== Early life ==
Ritter was born on April 24, 1984, in Stillwater, Oklahoma, to Tim and Tracy Ritter (née Lyons), his mother is an employee at Stillwater Public Schools. He graduated from Stillwater High School.

== Career ==
Ritter met his bandmates while he was at a party in high school. After Jesse Tabish quit the band, and with the additions of Mike Kennerty and Chris Gaylor, The All-American Rejects were picked up by Doghouse Records, and later DreamWorks Records, and subsequently signed with the major label Interscope Records. In early 2018, the band left Interscope. As of July 2019, they are signed to Epitaph Records. The All-American Rejects have released four albums, and have sold over 10 million albums worldwide and 4 million singles.

Ritter has appeared in television series and films such as House (2007), The House Bunny (2008), Betas (2013–14), and Parenthood (2013–15). On November 5, 2013, Ritter released the song "Air" as a solo song to help "ride between the Rejects' next record", which was featured on Parenthood.

Shortly after the release of "Air", Ritter wrote the song "Collide", which was also featured on Parenthood. The song has not been released.

Ritter's next projects included a role in the John Cusack film Love and Mercy (2014). He had also been cast in the lead role of singer Gregg Allman in the biopic Midnight Rider, directed by Randall Miller, but the film was halted in production, and ultimately cancelled, due to the death of camera assistant Sarah Jones. The following year, Ritter had a supporting role in the comedy-drama film Miss You Already.

On August 6, 2021, Ritter released was featured on the Lil Huddy single "Don't Freak Out", additionally featuring Iann Dior and Travis Barker, co-written by All American Rejects bandmate Nick Wheeler.

Ritter starred in the 2022 family drama film Prisoner's Daughter.

In October 2022, Ritter formed the band Now More Than Ever with guitarist Izzy Fontaine and keyboardist Scott Chesak. Their debut album, Creatrix, was released in March 2023.

In 2025, Ritter's band The All American Rejects resumed activity with two singles released as part of an EP titled 'Sandbox' with a US tour.

On May 15, 2026, Ritter's band The All American Rejects released their 5th album titled "Sandbox". Sandbox contains 11 tracks plus a live recording of the song "Search Party" from one of their intimate house party concert tours.

== Personal life ==
Ritter and actress Elena Satine were engaged in April 2013 and married on New Year's Eve that year. They have a son. Ritter lived in New Zealand during the COVID-19 pandemic. Ritter announced that he and his family were moving to Tulsa, Oklahoma, in 2023.

Ritter joined OnlyFans in June 2025 as part of the promotion for the All-American Rejects' single "Easy Come, Easy Go", released on June 5 and later included on their album Sandbox. He described the account to GQ as offering "full-frontal rock and roll with all access", while discussing OnlyFans as a way for the band to connect directly with fans outside traditional music-industry channels. The account offered behind-the-scenes material and an alternate version of the "Easy Come, Easy Go" music video, while playing on OnlyFans' association with adult content. Vice reported that Ritter's early posts included suggestive shower photographs rather than explicit material.

== Equipment ==
Ritter likes to use Fender bass guitars. He had previously used Epiphone Flying V or Epiphone Explorer basses during the era of The All-American Rejects, until he started to favor a Fender Precision Bass and started using them more often in his songs. Ritter was also seen using a Gibson Thunderbird bass on their early tours for Move Along and also with a rare Jackson Guitars V Bass. He then later used Fender Jaguar Bass guitars for later tours before switching back to Fender Precision Basses.

== Filmography ==
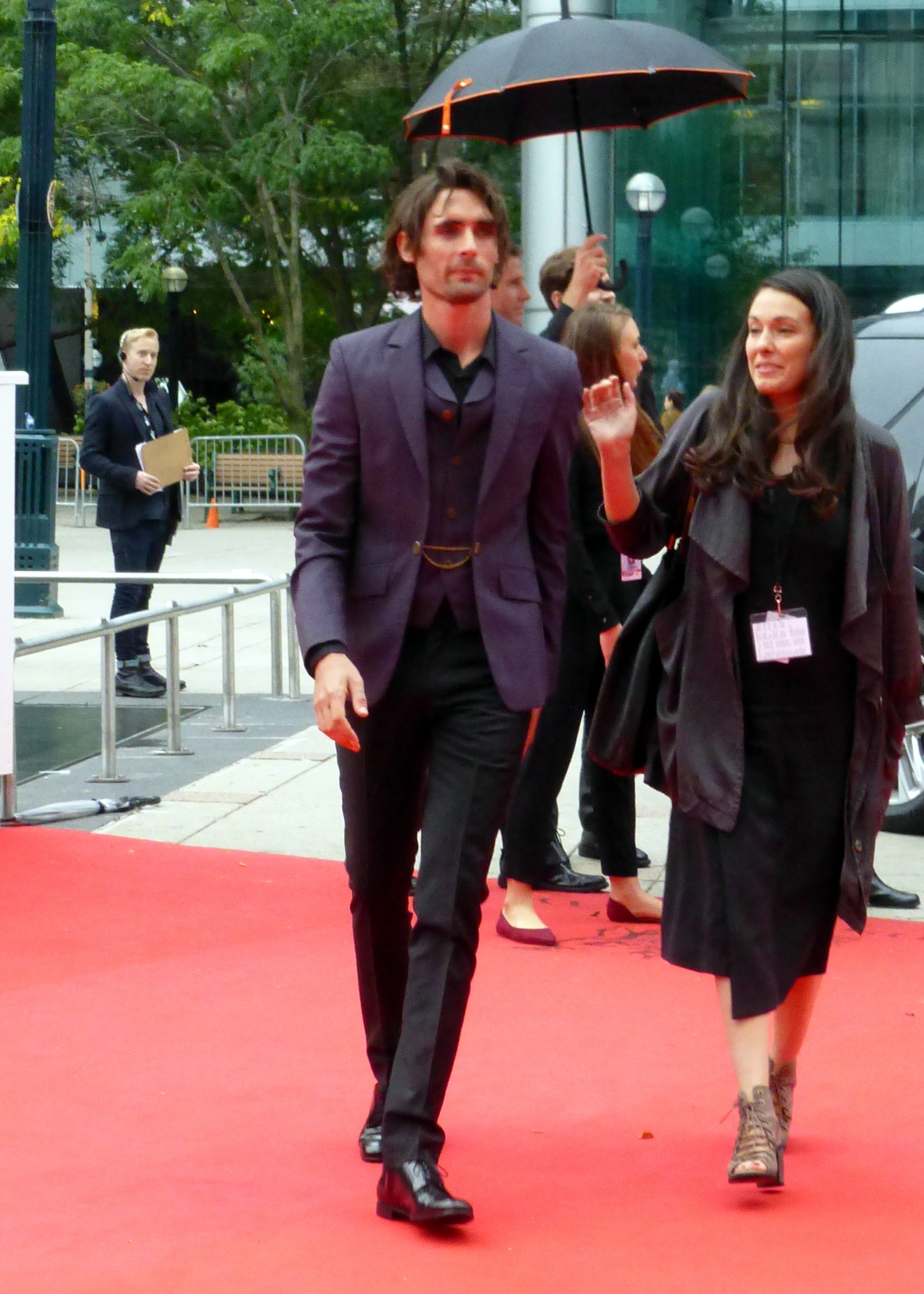
Ritter at the 2015 Toronto Film Festival

=== Film ===
Year	Title	Role	Notes
2008	The House Bunny	Colby	
2014	Love & Mercy	Hipster #1	
2015	The Pinhole Affect	Himself	Short film
2015	Miss You Already	Ace	
2016	The Sweet Life	Marlon	
2017	Ray Meets Helen	Woody	
2018	Peppermint	Sam	
2018	Gloria Bell	Neighbor	
2018	Desolate	Ned Stone	
2022	Prisoner's Daughter	Tyler	
2023	Johnny & Clyde	Guy	
2026	Street Smart	Gavin	

=== Television ===
Year	Title	Role	Notes
2003	Feable Weiner	Jock	Music Video - San Deem us Ready
2006	Smallville	Himself	Episode: "Wither"
2007	House	Himself	Episode: Fetal Position
2012	90210	Himself	Episode: Trust, Truth and Traffic
2013–2014	Betas	Dane	5 episodes
2013–2015	Parenthood	Oliver Rome	10 episodes
2015	Wicked City	Bucket	2 episodes
2017–2019	Preacher	Jesus Christ/Humperdoo	15 episodes
2018	Lodge 49	Avery	5 episodes
2020	Monsterland	Breezy	1 episode
2021	Cowboy Bebop	Iron Mink	1 episode
