= Susan Boyle discography =

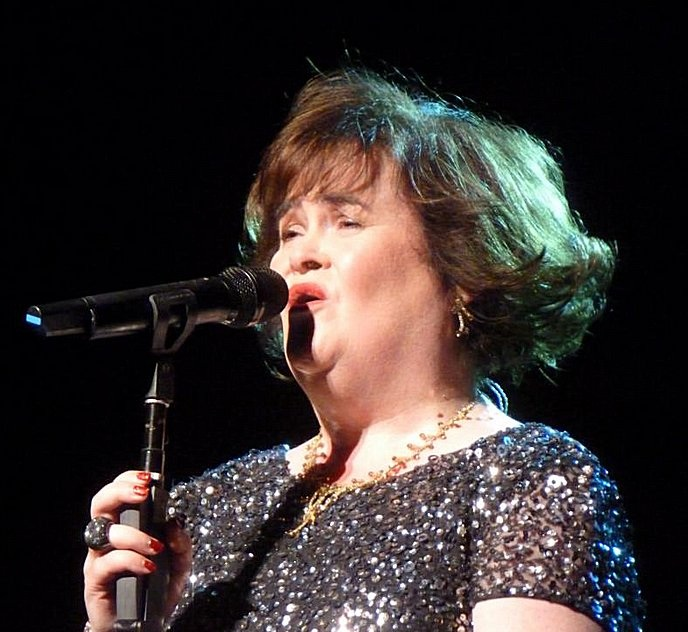
- Susan Boyle in July 2013
- Studio albums: 7
- Compilation albums: 1
- Singles: 16
- Video albums: 2
- Music videos: 6

The discography of Susan Boyle, a Scottish singer, contains seven studio albums and sixteen singles, thirteen as a solo artist, and three as a featured artist. Boyle achieved global attention after auditioning for Series 3 of Britain's Got Talent in 2009. After much attention, Boyle signed a record deal with British record producer Simon Cowell, releasing her worldwide multi-platinum selling début album I Dreamed a Dream. The album contained four singles, the first two seeing somewhat more success in the UK and the US. The first single, "Wild Horses" reached number nine on the UK Singles Chart and the second single "I Dreamed a Dream" reached the top forty of the that chart. In the United States, Boyle's album charted at number one on the Billboard 200 album charts. The first single "Wild Horses" peaked at number ninety-eight and the second single "I Dreamed a Dream" peaked at number sixty-two on the US Billboard Hot 100.

In 2010, Boyle was one of few artists who featured on Simon Cowell's 2010 Haiti earthquake appeal single, "Everybody Hurts", a cover of the R.E.M. song. On 9 July 2010, Boyle announced that her second album would be a Christmas album entitled The Gift. As part of the lead-up to the album, she held a competition called Susan's Search, the winner of which sang a duet with her on her new CD. The album was released on 8 November 2010. For her third studio album, Emeli Sandé For her third studio album, Someone to Watch Over Me, released on 31 October 2011, Emeli Sande reported helped Boyle write some songs. Boyle performed on the second semi-final results show of the sixth season of America's Got Talent, which aired on 31 August 2011. Boyle made her first appearance in Australia, on The X Factor, on 8 November 2011 and sang "Autumn Leaves". In November 2012 her fourth studio album, Standing Ovation: The Greatest Songs from the Stage, was released. On two of the songs on the album, she collaborates with Donny Osmond.

As of 2013, Boyle had sold over 25 million records worldwide. All seven of her seven studio albums released have charted within the top ten of the albums chart in her native Scotland. Her first compilation album, Ten (2019) reached the top ten in Scotland, Australia and the United Kingdom, as well as reaching number forty-nine on the US Billboard Top Album Sales chart.

== Albums ==
=== Studio albums ===
Title	Details	Peak chart positions										Sales	Certifications
Title	Details	SCO	AUS	CAN	FRA	IRE	NLD	NZ	SWE	UK	US	Sales	Certifications
I Dreamed a Dream	Released: 23 November 2009; Label: Syco Music, Columbia, Sony Music (#88697554542); Format: CD, digital download	1	1	1	8	1	1	1	2	1	1	UK: 1,932,657; US: 3,195,000; World: 14,000,000	BPI: 7× Platinum; ARIA: 10× Platinum; IFPI SWI: Platinum; IRMA: 8× Platinum; MC: 5× Platinum; RIAA: 4× Platinum; RMNZ: 11× Platinum; SNEP: Platinum
The Gift	Released: 8 November 2010; Label: Syco Music, Columbia, Sony Music (#88697720772); Format: CD, digital download	1	2	1	29	4	1	1	10	1	1	UK: 609,602; US: 2,180,000; World: 3,700,000	BPI: 2× Platinum; ARIA: 3× Platinum; IRMA: 2× Platinum; MC: 2× Platinum; RIAA: 3× Platinum; RMNZ: 4× Platinum
Someone to Watch Over Me	Released: 1 November 2011; Label: Syco Music, Columbia, Sony Music (#88697962522); Format: CD, digital download	1	1	6	145	11	18	2	9	1	4	UK: 344,508; US: 700,000	BPI: Platinum; ARIA: 2× Platinum; IRMA: Gold; MC: Gold; RIAA: Gold; RMNZ: 2× Platinum
Standing Ovation: The Greatest Songs from the Stage	Released: 13 November 2012; Label: Syco Music, Columbia, Sony Music (#88765417892); Format: CD, digital download	1	6	17	—	19	11	1	3	5	12	UK: 175,488; US: 250,000	BPI: Gold; ARIA: Platinum; RMNZ: Platinum
Home for Christmas	Released: 25 October 2013; Label: Syco Music, Columbia, Sony Music; Format: CD, digital download	4	13	17	—	20	12	3	—	9	17	UK: 122,488; US: 208,000	BPI: Gold; RMNZ: Platinum
Hope	Released: 21 October 2014; Label: Syco Music, Columbia, Sony Music; Format: CD, digital download	7	11	—	—	—	—	6	—	13	16	US: 115,000	BPI: Silver; RMNZ: Gold
A Wonderful World	Released: 25 November 2016; Label: Syco Music, Columbia, Sony Music; Format: CD, digital download	7	14	—	—	35	—	8	—	22	150		BPI: Silver
"—" denotes album that did not chart or was not released.

=== Compilation albums ===
Title	Details	Peak chart positions			
Title	Details	SCO	AUS	UK	US
Ten	Released: 31 May 2019; Label: Syco Music, Columbia, Sony Music; Format: CD, digital download	2	5	5	– (Note: "Ten" did not enter the US Billboard 200, but peaked at number 49 on the US Top Album Sales.)

=== Video albums ===
Title	Details	Certification
The Making of a Dream	Released: 2009; Label: Sony	
An Unlikely Superstar	Released: 2011; Label: Syco, Sony	ARIA: Gold

== Singles ==
=== As lead artist ===
Title	Year	Peak chart positions									Certifications	Album
Title	Year	SCO	UK	AUS	CAN	IRE	NLD	SWE	SWI	US	Certifications	Album
"Wild Horses"	2009	8	9	93	95	11	99	—	—	98	BPI: Silver	I Dreamed a Dream
"I Dreamed a Dream"	2009	27	37	66	65	20	—	59	37	62		I Dreamed a Dream
"You'll See"	2010	—	197	—	—	—	—	—	—	—		I Dreamed a Dream
"Amazing Grace"	2010	—	—	—	—	—	—	—	—	—		I Dreamed a Dream
"Perfect Day"	2010	—	124	—	—	—	—	—	—	—		The Gift
"I Know Him So Well" (with Geraldine McQueen)	2011	10	11	—	—	—	—	—	—	—		Non-album single
"You Have to Be There"	2011	—	—	—	—	—	—	—	—	—		Someone to Watch Over Me
"Enjoy the Silence"	2011	—	—	—	—	—	—	—	—	—		Someone to Watch Over Me
"Unchained Melody"	2011	—	—	—	—	—	—	—	—	—		Someone to Watch Over Me
"Autumn Leaves"	2011	—	—	—	—	—	—	—	—	—		Someone to Watch Over Me
"The Winner Takes It All"	2012	—	—	—	—	—	—	—	—	—		Standing Ovation: The Greatest Songs from the Stage
"O Come, All Ye Faithful" (with Elvis Presley)	2013	27	48	—	—	—	—	—	—	—		Home for Christmas
"You Raise Me Up"	2014	—	—	—	—	—	—	—	—	—		Hope
"Just One (ReMAXed Remix)"	2026	—	—	—	—	—	—	—	—	—		Non-album single
"—" denotes single that did not chart or was not released

=== As featured artist ===
Title	Year	Peak chart positions						Album
Title	Year	UK	AUS	IRE	NZ	SWE	SWI	Album
"Everybody Hurts" (as part of Helping Haiti)	2010	1	28	1	17	21	16	Charity single
"A Mother's Prayer" (with Jackie Evancho)	2011	—	—	—	—	—	—	Dream with Me
"From This Moment On" (with Plácido Domingo)	2012	—	—	—	—	—	—	Songs
"—" denotes single that did not chart or was not released

=== Promotional singles ===
Title	Year	Album
"Who I Was Born to Be"	2009	I Dreamed a Dream

== Music videos ==
Title	Year	Director
"Perfect Day"	2010	Lou Reed
"I Know Him So Well"	2010	
"You Have to Be There"	2011	
"Unchained Melody"	2011	
"Autumn Leaves"	2011	
