= List of awards and nominations received by Susan Boyle =

Susan Boyle awards and nominations
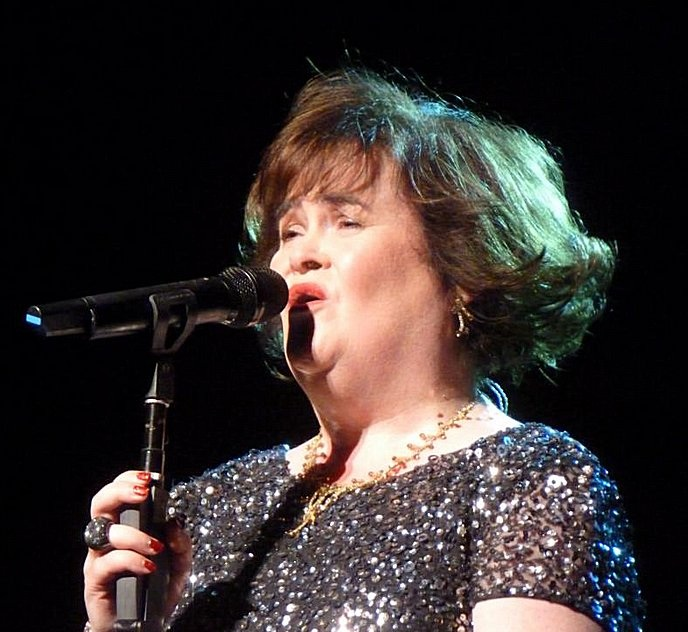
- Boyle performing live in 2013
Awards and nominations
Award	Wins	Nominations
Billboard	0	2
Grammy	0	2

Totals (Note: Certain award groups do not simply award one winner. They acknowledge several different recipients, have runners-up, and have third place. Since this is a specific recognition and is different from losing an award, runner-up mentions are considered wins in this award tally. For simplification and to avoid errors, each award in this list has been presumed to have had a prior nomination.)
- Wins: 7
- Nominations: 16

This is a complete listing of awards and nominations received by Susan Boyle, a Scottish singer who achieved international success in 2009 after appearing as a contestant on the third series of Britain's Got Talent, singing "I Dreamed a Dream" from Les Misérables. As of 2021, Boyle has sold 25 million records. Her debut album, I Dreamed A Dream (2009), is one of the best-selling albums of the 21st century, having sold over 10 million copies worldwide, and it was the best-selling album internationally in 2009.

In September 2010 Boyle was presented with three Guinness World Records which were featured in the Guinness World Records 2011 edition published 16 September 2010. The three records were for Fastest-selling Album by a Female (UK), Most Successful First Week UK Debut Album Sales, as well as Oldest Artist to Reach No. 1 with a Debut Album (US & UK). On 20 November 2010 Boyle achieved another Guinness World Record for Oldest Female at No. 1 on UK Albums Chart with her second album The Gift. On 20 November 2010 Boyle received two other Guinness World Records due to the success of The Gift, one record being "Only British female artist to top both the US and UK album charts with two releases" and the other being "Most successful Christmas album in the UK" – "On 20 November 2010, Susan Boyle's (UK) album The Gift became the first Christmas album to ever top the UK chart."

In 2012 Boyle was awarded an honorary doctorate for her contribution to the creative industries from Edinburgh's Queen Margaret University, where she obtained a Certificate of Higher Education in caring. In 2015 Boyle was awarded an honorary doctorate in the field of music from the Royal Conservatoire of Scotland, Glasgow.

== Accolades ==
Boyle was victorious in a polling vote by readers of Parade Magazine in the United States in the category Favourite New Face where she beat the likes of Adam Lambert and Lady Gaga. Boyle won the Scot of the Year Award at the Glenfiddich Spirit of Scotland Awards in December, 2009, which was voted for by the people of Scotland. Additionally, she won the Scotscare Scot of the Year Award in 2010 in a poll with voting worldwide, with 95% of the vote – the largest win in Scotscare's history.

She was nominated for a People's Choice award in the category of Best Breakout Artist in the United States, and was also nominated for a Juno Award for Best International Album in Canada. She won a Gold Disc Award in the category of Top International Artist in Japan. Elsewhere in Asia, she won the Golden Chinese Music Award for Most Influential International Artist in China, as well as the World Music Award for the Best Selling Artist in the United Kingdom. She has been nominated for an ARIA Award in Australia in the category of Most Popular International Artist, as well as receiving nominations for two Grammy Awards. She was awarded the Outstanding Achievement Award at the Scottish Variety Awards on March 19, 2011, and has also received two nominations for two Billboard Magazine Awards – Top Billboard 200 Artist and Top Billboard 200 Album.

Susan Boyle was named seventh most influential person in the world in 2010 in a Time Magazine poll. Her position in the ranking saw her being placed 14 places above US President Barack Obama. In the same poll in 2011, Susan placed third, and was the highest placed woman that year.

In 2015, Boyle was awarded an Honorary Doctorate from the Royal Conservatoire of Scotland, Scotland's most prestigious music school.

== Awards and nominations ==
=== List of awards and nominations ===
Year	Association	Category	Result
2009	Glenfiddich Spirit of Scotland Awards	Top Scot of the Year	Won
2010	World Music Awards	Best New Artist	Nominated
2010	World Music Awards	World's Best Album – I Dreamed a Dream	Nominated
2010	World Music Awards	World's Best Selling British Artist	Won
2010	People's Choice Awards	Favorite Breakout Music Artist	Nominated
2010	Japan Gold Disc Award	Best New Artist International	Won
2010	Juno Award Canada	International Album of the Year	Nominated
2010	ARIA Music Awards Australia	Most Popular International Artist	Nominated
2010	Scotscare	Scot of the Year	Won
2011	Billboard Music Awards	Top Billboard 200 Album	Nominated
2011	Billboard Music Awards	Top Billboard 200 Artist	Nominated
2011	Scottish Variety Awards	Outstanding Achievement Award	Won
2011	53rd Grammy Awards	Best Pop Vocal Album – I Dreamed a Dream	Nominated
2012	54th Grammy Awards	Best Traditional Pop Vocal Album – The Gift	Nominated
2013	Radio Forth Awards	Icon Award	Won
2013	Scottish Music Awards	Fans Choice Award	Won

== See also ==
- Susan Boyle
  - Susan Boyle discography
