= Susan Boyle in Concert =

2013–2014 concert tour

- Tour by Susan Boyle
- Associated album: Standing Ovation: The Greatest Songs from the Stage
- Start date: 2 July 2013
- End date: 6 November 2014
- Legs: 3
- No. of shows: 26 in Europe; 21 in North America; 47 Total

Susan Boyle concert chronology
- Susan Boyle in Concert (2013–2014); Ten Tour (2019)

Susan Boyle in Concert is the first concert tour by singer Susan Boyle. The tour promoted Boyle's fourth album, Standing Ovation: The Greatest Songs from the Stage.

== Background ==
Boyle chose to launch her tour in Scotland as a thank you to her country for their support and hopes to take the tour global in 2014. The sell-out tour ran for seven nights with appearances in Inverness, Aberdeen, Dundee, Glasgow and Edinburgh. Boyle said, "This is the year that I feel that I would be able to give an audience what they want. I’ve always wanted to do my own show and now I feel confident enough to give it a go."

Lance Ellington, a regular vocalist on Strictly Come Dancing, opened the concert with a couple of songs, before Boyle appeared and launched into a 24-song set. Other performers included Ashleigh Gray and Annie Skates as back-up singers, plus a 7-piece orchestra and the Royal Conservatoire of Scotland choir. Andrew Panton was the creative director and Kennedy Aitchison was the musical director. The entire show ran for 135 minutes.

The second leg of Boyle's tour was 19 dates across the UK in March and April 2014. Boyle said, "I’m really looking forward to getting back on tour. I’m ready to take the next step and take my show to a whole host of towns and cities I have never played in before." In May 2014, Boyle announced the third leg of the tour, to plays theatres and concert halls in the United States. The leg will begin in San Diego, California, playing 21 shows throughout October and November, ending in Jacksonville, Florida.

== Concert synopsis ==
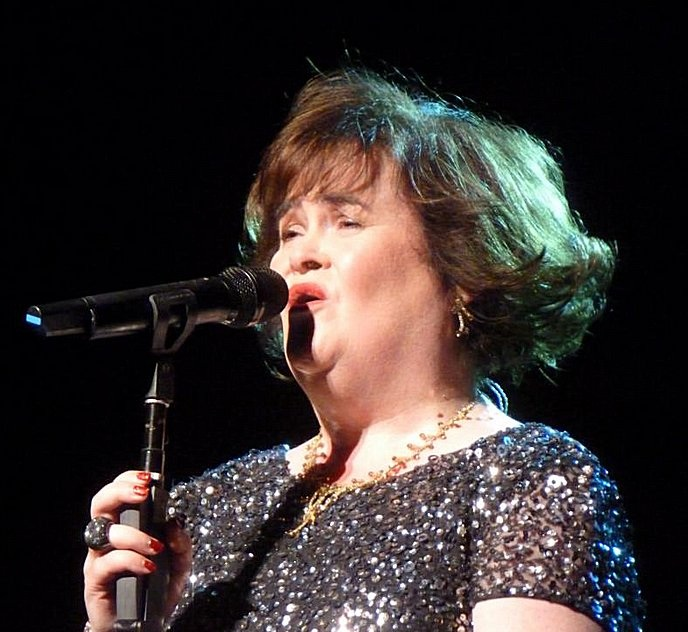
Boyle performing in Edinburgh

For her entrance, Boyle appeared in silhouette at the back of the stage giving her famous wiggle while an audio from her Britain's Got Talent audition played. The audience responded immediately by giving her a standing ovation before she even sang a single note. It was a reminder to people from where she started and how far she has come.

For the song "Somewhere Over the Rainbow" Boyle said, "This song is about a wee lassie who goes on an incredible journey." "I hope tonight to take you all on a journey". Some of the Jazz numbers, such as "That Ole Devil Called Love" and "Cry Me a River", Boyle sang while seated beside the piano. The first half ended with a rendition of "You Raise Me Up" accompanied by a choir from the Royal Conservatoire of Scotland.

The Second half included the song "Ae Fond Kiss" which Boyle dedicated to everyone who had lost someone in their lives. "River Deep, Mountain High", a duet with Lance Ellington, had the audience on their feet and dancing. The second half ended with "I Dreamed A Dream", which Boyle jokingly said, "has got me into a lot of trouble."

Throughout the concert, Boyle showed her sense of humor with jokes about her cat Pebbles and her boss Simon Cowell. She gave her impersonation of the judges from BGT which had the audience in stitches. The concert itself moved quickly, in which Boyle had several wardrobe changes appearing in different glamorous gowns.

== Critical reception ==
Boyle received rave reviews for her first solo tour with several standing ovations throughout each night. The Herald Scotland, giving 4 stars, reported, "There was lot riding on this appearance, the first night of her first ever live solo tour, but the phenomenon/riddle that is Susan Boyle proved equal to her task in the Highland Capital. Truth be told she blew Eden Court Theatre away." The Edinburgh Guide, also giving 4 stars, reported, "Cynics of TV reality shows may dismiss the notion that media-created pop singers have any real talent. But to witness Susan Boyle live on stage proves beyond doubt that this performance is no gimmick. Susan has a natural purity in her voice combined with genuine emotion and the effortless art of a true Diva in glamorous style."

== Opening act ==
- Lance Ellington (Europe)

== Setlist ==
The following songs were performed during the concert at the Eden Court Theatre in Inverness, Scotland. It does not represent all songs performed on tour.

1. "Out Here on My Own"
2. "Somewhere Over the Rainbow"
3. "The Winner Takes It All"
4. "I Know Him So Well" (duet with Ashleigh Gray)
5. "Wild Horses"
6. "That Ole Devil Called Love"
7. "Cry Me a River"
8. "The Way We Were"
9. "Answer Me"
10. "As Long as He Needs Me"
11. "You Raise Me Up"

Intermission

1. "The Perfect Year"
2. "Take That Look Off Your Face"
3. "All I Ask of You" (duet with Lance Ellington)
4. "Make You Feel My Love"
5. "Run Like the Wind"
6. "Ae Fond Kiss"
7. "Unchained Melody"
8. "Hold Me, Thrill Me, Kiss Me"
9. "This Is the Moment" (duet with Lance Ellington)
10. "River Deep – Mountain High" (duet with Lance Ellington)

Encore

22. "You'll Never Walk Alone"
23. "Who I Was Born to Be"
24. "I Dreamed a Dream"

== Tour dates ==
Date	City	Country	Venue
Europe
2 July 2013	Inverness	Scotland	Eden Court Theatre
4 July 2013	Aberdeen	Scotland	Music Hall
6 July 2013	Dundee	Scotland	Caird Hall
8 July 2013	Glasgow	Scotland	King's Theatre
9 July 2013	Glasgow	Scotland	King's Theatre
12 July 2013	Edinburgh	Scotland	Edinburgh Festival Theatre
13 July 2013	Edinburgh	Scotland	Edinburgh Festival Theatre
22 March 2014	Liverpool	England	Liverpool Empire Theatre
23 March 2014	York	England	Barbican Centre
25 March 2014	Manchester	England	Bridgewater Hall
26 March 2014	Newcastle	England	Newcastle City Hall
27 March 2014	Milton Keynes	England	Milton Keynes Theatre
29 March 2014	Oxford	England	New Theatre Oxford
30 March 2014	Nottingham	England	Nottingham Royal Concert Hall
1 April 2014	Leicester	England	De Montfort Hall
2 April 2014	Birmingham	England	Symphony Hall
3 April 2014	Cardiff	Wales	St David's Hall
5 April 2014	Bristol	England	Colston Hall
6 April 2014	London	England	Eventim Apollo
9 April 2014	Sheffield	England	Sheffield City Hall
10 April 2014	Stoke-on-Trent	England	Regent Theatre
12 April 2014	Plymouth	England	Plymouth Pavilions
13 April 2014	Torquay	England	Princess Theatre
15 April 2014	Bournemouth	England	Pavilion Theatre
16 April 2014	Cambridge	England	Cambridge Corn Exchange
17 April 2014	Northampton	England	The Derngate
North America
8 October 2014	San Diego	United States	Balboa Theatre
9 October 2014	Santa Barbara	United States	Arlington Theatre
11 October 2014	San Francisco	United States	SHN Orpheum Theatre
12 October 2014	Sacramento	United States	Community Centre Theater
14 October 2014	San Jose	United States	San Jose Center for the Performing Arts
16 October 2014	Costa Mesa	United States	Segerstrom Hall
17 October 2014	Phoenix	United States	Orpheum Theatre
19 October 2014	Midland	United States	Wagner Noël Performing Arts Center
20 October 2014	Fort Worth	United States	Bass Performance Hall
21 October 2014	San Antonio	United States	Tobin Center for the Performing Arts
23 October 2014	Kansas City	United States	Arvest Bank Theatre at the Midland
24 October 2014	Louisville	United States	Whitney Hall
26 October 2014	Atlanta	United States	Atlanta Symphony Hall
27 October 2014	Greenville	United States	Peace Concert Hall
29 October 2014	Durham	United States	Durham Performing Arts Center
30 October 2014	North Charleston	United States	North Charleston Performing Arts Center
1 November 2014	Clearwater	United States	Ruth Eckerd Hall
2 November 2014	Melbourne	United States	King Center for the Performing Arts
3 November 2014	Fort Lauderdale	United States	Au-Rene Theater
5 November 2014	Sarasota	United States	Van Wezel Performing Arts Hall
6 November 2014	Jacksonville	United States	Moran Theater
