= Ten (Susan Boyle album) =

Compilation album by Susan Boyle
- Released: 31 May 2019
- Recorded: 2009–2019
- Length: 65:24
- Labels: Syco; Columbia; Sony Music
- Producers: Steve Anderson; Cliff Masterson

Susan Boyle chronology
| A Wonderful World (2016) | Ten (2019) |

Ten is the first compilation album by the Scottish singer Susan Boyle. It was released on 31 May 2019 by Syco Music and Columbia Records. The album has 13 previously released songs with four new recordings ("A Million Dreams", "Stand by Me", "500 Miles" and "Climb Every Mountain").

== Track listing ==
| No. | Title | Writer(s) | Length |
|---|---|---|---|
| 1. | "A Million Dreams" (with Michael Ball and Rock Choir) | Justin Paul; Benj Pasek | 4:34 |
| 2. | "Stand by Me" | Ben E. King; Jerry Leiber; Mike Stoller | 2:57 |
| 3. | "500 Miles" | Charlie and Craig Reid | 3:38 |
| 4. | "Climb Every Mountain" | Richard Rodgers; Oscar Hammerstein II | 3:02 |
| 5. | "I Dreamed a Dream" | Alain Boublil; Claude-Michel Schönberg; Herbert Kretzmer | 3:11 |
| 6. | "Wild Horses" | Mick Jagger; Keith Richards | 4:55 |
| 7. | "Perfect Day" | Lou Reed | 4:30 |
| 8. | "Amazing Grace" | John Newton | 3:35 |
| 9. | "Mad World" | Roland Orzabal | 4:01 |
| 10. | "Cry Me a River" | Arthur Hamilton | 2:42 |
| 11. | "Hallelujah" | Leonard Cohen | 3:52 |
| 12. | "Unchained Melody" | Alex North; Hy Zaret | 3:48 |
| 13. | "Over the Rainbow" | Harold Arlen; Yip Harburg | 5:41 |
| 14. | "Daydream Believer" | John C. Stewart | 3:19 |
| 15. | "What a Wonderful World" | Bob Thiele; George David Weiss | 3:41 |
| 16. | "You Raise Me Up" (live) (featuring Lakewood Church Choir) | Rolf Løvland; Brendan Graham | 3:48 |
| 17. | "Who I Was Born to Be" | Audra Mae; Johan Fransson; Tim Larsson; Tobias Lundgren | 4:10 |
| Total length: | | | 65:24 |

Japanese edition bonus tracks
| No. | Title | Writer(s) | Length |
|---|---|---|---|
| 18. | "Wings to Fly" | Michio Yamagami; Kunihiko Murai | 3:51 |
| 19. | "Vapor Trail" | Yumi Arai | 3:46 |
| 20. | "Ue o Muite Arukō/The First Star" | Rokusuke Ei; Hachidai Nakamura | 4:01 |
| 21. | "Third Man Theme" | Anton Karas | 1:22 |
| Total length: | | | 78:35 |

== Charts ==
Chart performance for Ten
| Chart (2019) | Peak position |
|---|---|
| Australian Albums (ARIA) | 5 |
| Scottish Albums (Official Charts) | 2 |
| UK Albums (Official Charts) | 5 |
| US Top Album Sales (Billboard) | 49 |
