= Home for Christmas (Susan Boyle album) =

Studio album by Susan Boyle
- Released: 25 October 2013
- Recorded: 2013
- Genre: Christmas
- Length: 38:22
- Label: Syco; Sony Music
- Producer: Cliff Masterson; Steve Anderson

Susan Boyle chronology
Standing Ovation: The Greatest Songs from the Stage (2012)	Home for Christmas (2013)	Hope (2014)

Singles from Home for Christmas
- 1. "O Come, All Ye Faithful" Released: 6 December 2013

Professional ratings
Review scores
Source	Rating
AllMusic	3/5 stars
UltimateGuitar.com	7/10 stars
Renowned for Sound	4/5 stars
ABC News Entertainment	1.5/5 stars

Home for Christmas is the fifth studio album and second Christmas album by Scottish singer Susan Boyle. It was released on 25 October 2013 in Australia, on 29 October in the United States, and on 25 November 2013 in the United Kingdom. The album is a Christmas holiday album featuring a posthumous duet with Elvis Presley who died in 1977 and two duets with Johnny Mathis and The Overtones. The album also features an original song, "Miracle Hymn", written for Boyle's debut acting role in the film The Christmas Candle.

== Background ==
Boyle was granted permission to use recordings of Elvis Presley from Graceland Estates singing "O Come, All Ye Faithful". The single was released on 6 December 2013 in Ireland and on 8 December in the United Kingdom, as a charity single for Save The Children U.K. and for the Elvis Presley Charitable Foundation in the U.S. It is the second time Boyle has covered "O Come, All Ye Faithful". She first covered the song for her second album, The Gift (2010).

== Track listing ==
No.	Title	Writer(s)	Producer(s)	Length
1.	"O Come, All Ye Faithful" (duet with Elvis Presley)	Traditional/Arranged by Elvis Presley	Felton Jarvis (Elvis Presley's vocals & original instrumental track), Cliff Masterson, Steve Anderson	2:54
2.	"The Lord's Prayer"	Albert Hay Malotte	Masterson, Anderson	3:45
3.	"The Little Drummer Boy" (featuring The Overtones)	Harry Simeone, Henry Onorati, Katherine Davis	Masterson, Anderson	3:35
4.	"I'll Be Home for Christmas"	Buck Ram, Walter Kent, Kim Gannon	Masterson, Anderson	3:08
5.	"When a Child Is Born" (featuring Johnny Mathis)	Zacar, Fred Jay	Masterson, Anderson	3:17
6.	"The Christmas Song"	Mel Tormé, Robert Wells	Masterson, Anderson	2:36
7.	"I Believe in Father Christmas"	Sergei Prokofiev, Peter Sinfield, Greg Lake	Masterson, Anderson	3:29
8.	"Have Yourself a Merry Little Christmas"	Ralph Blane, Hugh Martin	Masterson, Anderson	2:50
9.	"Hark! The Herald Angels Sing"	Traditional/Arranged by Cliff Masterson/Steve Anderson	Masterson, Anderson	3:45
10.	"The Christmas Waltz"	Jule Styne, Sammy Cahn	Masterson, Anderson	2:35
11.	"In the Bleak Midwinter"	Traditional/Arranged by Masterson/Anderson	Masterson, Anderson	3:31
12.	"Miracle Hymn"	Luke Atencio, Candace Lee	Masterson, Anderson, Amory Leader	2:57

Notes

- "O Come, All Ye Faithful" uses samples from the 1971 Elvis Presley recording of the same name from the album Elvis sings The Wonderful World of Christmas

== Personnel ==
Unless otherwise indicated, information is also taken from Allmusic

- Susan Boyle - vocals (tracks 6, 8, 10, 12, lead on tracks 1–5, 7, 9, 11)
- Dishan Abrahams - bass guitar (tracks 5, 7)
- Steve Anderson - musical arrangement (tracks 2–3, 5, 7, 9–11), music programming (1, 3, 5, 7, 10), drums (3, 5, 7), bass guitar (3), piano (10), keyboards (3, 11)
- Graham Archer - recording engineer (track 3)
- Steven Blake - bagpipes (track 3)
- Kevin Burleigh - recording engineer (track 7)
- Carmel Thomas Youth Singers - choir vocals (track 1)
- Chris Hill - bass played by (tracks 4, 6, 8)
- Ginger Holliday - sampled background vocals (track 1)
- The Imperials - sampled background vocals (track 1)
- Jake Jackson - recording engineer (track 12), audio mixing (12)
- Rob Johnston - choir director (tracks 2, 4–5, 7, 9, 11)
- Charlie Kenny - drums (tracks 4, 6, 8)
- Sean Kenny - recording engineer (tracks 2–11)
- Millie Kirkham - background vocals (track 1)
- Adam Looker - assistant recording engineer (tracks 2–3, 12)
- Andrew Lucas - choir director (tracks 2, 9, 11)
- Lorne MacDougall - bagpipes (track 3)
- Avril Mackintosh - recording engineer (tracks 3–12), Pro Tools engineer (1)
- Cliff Masterson - musical arrangement (tracks 2–11), music programming (1–3, 7, 9), orchestra conductor (2), piano (2, 5–8), keyboards (3, 11), drums (3, 7), bass guitar (3), organ played by (9)
- Johnny Mathis - guest vocals, lead vocals (track 5)
- Michael McGoldrick - uilleann pipes (track 7)
- Charlie McKerron - fiddle (track 7)
- Fred Molin - recording engineer (track 5)
- Jimmy Nielson - assistant recording engineer (tracks 2–12)
- James Nisbet - guitar (tracks 4–5, 7, 10)
- The Overtones - guest vocals, background vocals (track 3)
- Elvis Presley - sampled lead vocals (track 1)
- Temple Riser - sampled background vocals (track 1)
- Royal Philharmonic Orchestra - strings performed by (tracks 2, 5, 7, 11)
- RSVP Voices - choir vocals (tracks 2, 4–5, 7, 9, 11)
- Donald Shaw - accordion (track 7), recording engineer (7)
- St. Albans Cathedral Boys Choir - background vocals (tracks 2, 9, 11)
- Mitch Stevens - background vocals (track 7)
- Gary Thomas - recording engineer (tracks 2–12)
- Tom Trapp - musical arrangement (track 12)
- Jeremy Wheatley - audio mixing (tracks 2–12)
- Zone 1 Brass - brass performed by (track 1)

== Charts ==
=== Weekly charts ===
Chart (2013−14)	Peak position
Australian Albums (ARIA)	13
Belgian Albums (Ultratop Flanders)	36
Belgian Albums (Ultratop Wallonia)	118
Canadian Albums (Billboard)	17
Dutch Albums (Album Top 100)	32
Greek Albums (IFPI)	64
Irish Albums (IRMA)	20
New Zealand Albums (RMNZ)	3
Scottish Albums (OCC)	4
UK Albums (OCC)	9
US Billboard 200	17
US Top Holiday Albums (Billboard)	3

=== Year-end charts ===
Chart (2013)	Position
Australian Albums (ARIA)	99
UK Albums (OCC)	74

Chart (2014)	Position
US Billboard 200	100

=== Certifications ===
Sales certifications for Home for Christmas
Region	Certification	Certified units/sales
New Zealand (RMNZ)	Platinum	15,000^{^}
United Kingdom (BPI)	Gold	100,000^{^}
United States	—	208,000
^{^} Shipments figures based on certification alone.

== Release history ==
Region	Date	Format	Label
Australia	25 October 2013	CD, digital download	Syco Music, Sony Music
United States	29 October 2013	CD, digital download	Syco Music, Columbia
United Kingdom	25 November 2013	CD, digital download	Syco Music, Sony Music
