= Susan Boyle: An Unlikely Superstar =

2011 British documentary film

- Genre: Documentary
- Created by: Osca Humphreys
- Starring: Susan Boyle
- Country of origin: United Kingdom
- Original language: English

Production
- Executive producer: Kirsty Wilson
- Running time: 60 minutes

Original release
- Network: ITV; TLC
- Release: 4 November 2011

Susan Boyle: An Unlikely Superstar is a documentary made in 2011 by filmmaker Osca Humphreys and produced by Firecracker Films for UK network ITV. The documentary was distributed internationally by Zodiak Rights.

The film crew followed Susan Boyle around the world for 3 months from Shanghai, China, to New Zealand, to New York City, to her back garden in Blackburn, Scotland.

The documentary attempted to answer the question of whether having achieved her dream of becoming a professional singer and with more wealth and fame than she ever imagined or even desired, she is now happy and as stated in the documentary "living the dream".

== Content ==
The documentary starts with Susan Boyle preparing for a performance at the Shanghai Grand Stadium as a guest star on China's Got Talent, in front of a live audience of 58,000 people and a television audience of 560 million. The narrator notes that "In 2009 the biggest selling album in the world was not by Beyonce or Lady Gaga ... It was by an unknown, unemployed, lonely woman from Scotland." Many of the songs from her 3rd album "Someone To Watch Over Me" play in the background during the documentary, and scenes from the recording studio are included, as she works on the album with her producer and prepares the music with her vocal coach, Yvie Burnett.

Memorable scenes from the documentary allow us in to the private world of Susan Boyle attending a meeting in London with her manager and Simon Cowell, an emotional and uplifting meeting with some of her fans in New York in August 2011, being honoured at her local village Blackburn Gala Day on 11 June 2011, recording a track for "Someone to Watch Over Me", and attending rehearsals for the musical I Dreamed a Dream, which tells Boyle's life story. She becomes very emotional as the musical rehearses Boyle's painful life episodes. The documentary shows the close connection that Boyle has with her manager.

In Boyle's home in Blackburn, the viewer is shown the plaque from Sony for her 14,000,000 sales in 14 months. Boyle states, "I get embarrassed. I'm nobody special." In one scene, Boyle is sitting alone on a bench in the back garden of her home. She reads the plaque on the bench "In loving memory of our dear mum & dad Pat & Bridie Boyle always in our hearts from their loving family". Since her parents died, and her siblings have moved away, Boyle expresses that she often has feelings of loneliness. She has a few friends in Blackburn, but she still has a longing to meet that "special person" with whom to share her life.

== Promotion and Reception ==
The documentary first aired in the UK on ITV on 4 November 2011. As reported in the media: "SuBo perks up ITV's Friday night ratings On Friday night The 9pm hour belonged to ITV's Susan Boyle: An Unlikely Superstar, which averaged 5.5 million viewers and a 22.4% audience share, rising to 5.8 million with ITV +1." In the U.S. the documentary first aired on 6 November 2011 on the TLC cable channel and is still available to viewers in the U.S. via Netflix.

In Australia the documentary was sold as a DVD and attained Platinum accreditation as per ARIA Charts - Accreditations - 2011 DVDs.
