= There's Something About Susan =

British television documentary

- Genre: Documentary
- Starring: Susan Boyle
- Country of origin: United Kingdom
- Original language: English

Original release
- Network: ITV
- Release: 12 December 2013

There's Something About Susan is a 2013 British documentary about Scottish singer Susan Boyle, produced in 2013 by Firecracker Films for UK network ITV. In the film, Boyle is followed around Scotland and Houston, Texas, US. The film's aim was to discover whether Boyle could overcome her anxieties and stress in order to cope with her first-ever concert tour.

== Summary ==
The documentary follows Susan Boyle as she prepares for her first-ever solo concert tour to take place in Scotland in July 2013. The documentary, which first aired on ITV in the UK on 12 December 2013, gives the audience a glimpse of the struggles and anxieties about performing live which Boyle has had to deal with and which have previously prevented her from touring. Boyle addresses the topic of her then-recent Asperger's diagnosis and the relief it brought her.

The viewer sees Boyle under extreme stress at rehearsals and shortly before the first concert performance at Inverness 2 July 2013. When asked if she fears letting her musical director down, she replies that she fears letting everyone down. The documentary shows the relief and joy of Boyle and her team after her triumphant opening night in Inverness. The film closes with Boyle performing in front of 20,000 people at Lakewood Church in Houston, Texas on 17 November 2013.

== The documentary in the US ==
The documentary aired in the US under the title Susan Boyle: Her Secret Struggle on Ovation TV channel, with the premiere on 9 April 2014.
