= Amber McNaught =

British author and former journalist

Amber Eve
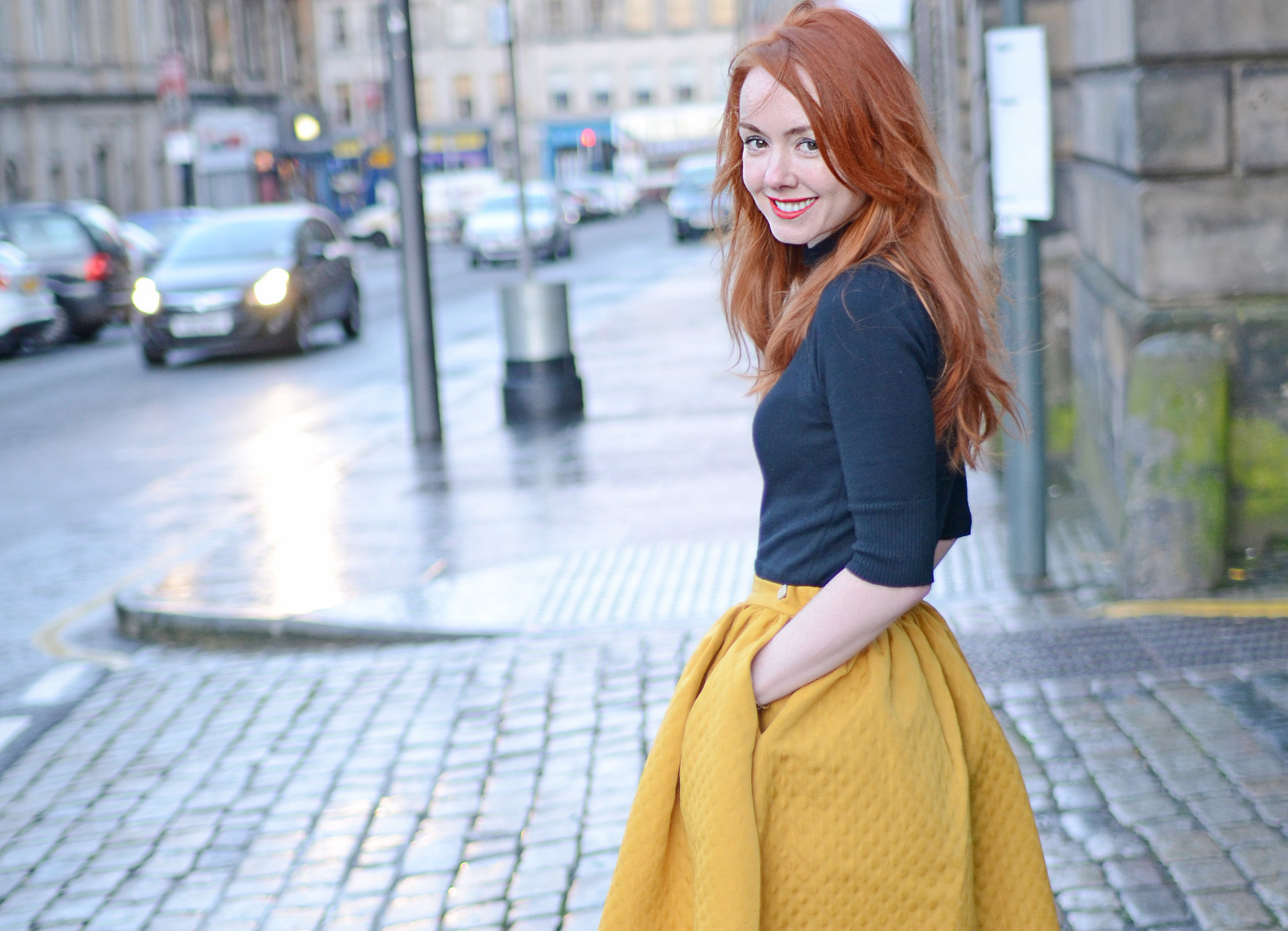
- Amber in November 2016
- Other name: Amber McNaught
- Occupation: Author
- Website: foreveramber.co.uk

Amber Eve (McNaught) is a British author and former journalist. She is best known for her fashion blogs and for reviewing Susan Boyle before she gained fame on Britain's Got Talent.

== Early history ==
After graduating from the University of Edinburgh in the late nineties with a Masters in English literature, McNaught started working as an editorial assistant for the West Lothian Courier which is part of the Mirror group. After a short while, McNaught moved to a full-time reporting role for the West Lothian Herald & Post (owned by Johnston Press). In one of her more well-known articles, McNaught reviewed the first album that Susan Boyle ever sang on. After the Herald & Post production was downsized, McNaught moved to a role in public relations with West Lothian Council which was her final job before moving into the field of online publishing with the formation of her publishing company Hot Igloo Productions Ltd.

== Freelancing ==
In the early 2000s, McNaught freelanced for a number of organisations including The Scotsman, The Edinburgh Evening News, Scotland on Sunday and Glenmorangie. In the field of blogging, McNaught wrote regularly for the now defunct Shiny Media. During this period, McNaught founded her first fashion blogs.

McNaught's piece on The Famous Five was published in TWiTTERTiTTERS as part of a fundraising drive for Comic Relief in 2009.

== Blogging ==
ForeverAmber is McNaught's blog and is a mix of fashion and lifestyle blogging. ForeverAmber was one of the most popular personal style blogs in the United Kingdom and was featured in articles about UK fashion bloggers in the mid-2010s. McNaught is well known for her large collection of shoes and was interviewed on the Vanessa Feltz Show, as well as being featured in multiple publications including: Office Magazine, Essentials Magazine, Company Magazine, Boden Style Guide, YouLookFab, ASOS, House of Fraser and She Magazine.

== Writing ==
In July 2016, McNaught released her first book My Blogging Secrets.

In 2017, McNaught was commissioned by The Quarto Group to write an illustrated guide to capsule wardrobes called Closet Essentials. The book was released in October 2017.

In 2022 McNaught self-published her first novel under the pen name of Amber Eve. Since then McNaught has gone on to self-publish a total of 9 novels.

In February 2026 Amber Eve announced a two book deal with the imprint of Bonnier, Black and White Books. With her first traditionally published book, Highland Getaway being published on June 4th 2026
