= The Woman I Was Born to Be =

Autobiography of Scottish singer Susan Boyle

- Author: Susan Boyle
- Genre: Autobiography
- Publisher: Bantam Press
- Publication date: October 12, 2010
- Pages: 328
- ISBN: 9780593066942

The Woman I Was Born to Be: My Story is the autobiography of Scottish singer Susan Boyle, published in October 2010.

Boyle describes her childhood growing up in a large Catholic family and the importance of her faith. She addresses the bullying she endured and the prominent place of music in her life. She deals with her despair and difficulties coping after her mother's death in 2007. She relates what it was like to experience sudden global fame as a result of her Britain's Got Talent appearance.
