= Cliff Masterson =

British musician

- Born: United Kingdom
- Genres: Classical, opera, pop
- Occupations: Conductor, songwriter, arranger, producer

Cliff Masterson is an orchestrator, conductor, songwriter, arranger and music producer.

He graduated from the Royal Academy of Music in 1995.

Cliff was awarded an Associate of the Royal Academy of Music (ARAM) in 2016 and a Fellow of the Royal Academy of Music in 2022.

== Career ==
=== Classical music ===
He has worked as both orchestrator and conductor for artists including The Opera Babes, The Froncysyllte Male Voice Choir, The Spirit of the Glen, Leslie Garrett, G4, Vanessa Mae and celebrated tenor Mario Frangoulis. He has conducted the Royal Philharmonic Orchestra, The Nashville String Machine, London Session Orchestra as well as orchestras in Prague and Los Angeles.

Cliff arranged and produced the "Titanic Requiem" for Robin Gibb. The album, released in 2012, was the last work by the Bee Gee before his death. The hour-long work conducted by Cliff, was premiered at Westminster Central Hall in April 2012, featuring performances by Isabel Suckling, Aled Jones and the Royal Philharmonic Orchestra.

=== Pop ===
As an arranger and producer, his credits include Little Mix, Emeli Sandé, Kylie Minogue, Michael McDonald, Westlife, Ronan Keating, Lionel Richie, Labrinth, Il Divo and Oasis.

Cliff has co-produced three albums for multi million selling artist Susan Boyle with Steve Anderson. "Home For Christmas", "Hope" and "Wonderful World".

As a songwriter he has had songs recorded by Charlotte Church, Shayne Ward, Journey South, Anthony Callea, Tina Arena and Andy Abraham.

He also wrote and produced the theme song, "Destiny", for the Mission: SPACE attraction in Walt Disney World, Florida.

In November 2012, Masterson was the conductor for a slowed-down orchestral version of Mumford and Sons song "I Will Wait" from Little Mix at the Radio 1 Live Lounge. He also arranged strings in this version.

=== Musical theatre ===
He has worked as musical director for the National Youth Music Theatre (NYMT), Theatr Clwyd and the New Shakespeare Company. He has written two award-winning musicals and has been a finalist in the Vivan Ellis/PRS awards having had his work performed at both the London Palladium and the Edinburgh Festival. He has worked on albums for Lee Mead (Joseph and the Amazing Technicolor Dreamcoat) and Connie Fisher (The Sound of Music) for Andrew Lloyd Webber. He has also produced tracks for Michael Ball.

=== Film ===
He has orchestrated movies including Alfie, Goal!, The Hole, The Mummy 3, Doctor Strange and Hacksaw Ridge. He has conducted movies including Jurassic World Dominion, Elvis and The Batman.

=== Selected works ===
- Spider-Man: Brand New Day (2026) - Conductor
- Josh Groban - Both Sides Now (2020) - String arranger, conductor
- Depeche Mode - BBC Radio 2 Piano room sessions (2023) - String arranger, conductor
- Tom Walker - Leave A Light On (2018) - String arranger, conductor
- Knives Out: Glass Onion - (2022) - Conductor
- Dug Days - Conductor
- Werewolf by Night (TV special) - (2022) - Conductor
- Elvis - (2022) - Conductor
- Thor: Love and Thunder - (2022) - Conductor
- The Batman - (2022) - Conductor
- Jurassic World: Dominion - (2022) - Conductor
- Mission: Space - Destiny - Songwriter and producer
- Call of Duty: Vanguard - (2021) - Conductor
- The Witches - (2020) - Conductor
- Luke Evans - At Last (2019) Arranger, Conductor
- Il Divo - Timeless (2018) Orchestral arranger
- Alien: Covenant - (2017) - Conductor
- Doctor Strange - (2016) - Conductor
- Hacksaw Ridge - (2016) - Conductor
- Kylie Christmas - (2015) - Arranger, conductor
- Emeli Sandé - Our Version Of Events (2012) - String arranger, conductor
- Susan Boyle - Producer, String arranger, conductor
- Little Mix - Secret Love Song (2016) - String arranger, conductor
- Michael McDonald - Motown - String arranger
