= Rose Jang =

- Born: May 12, 1979 (age 47)
- Origin: Princeton, New Jersey, USA
- Genres: Crossover, classical, pop opera, Broadway musicals, Christian music, opera arias
- Occupations: Professional Pop Opera Soprano, Ambassador for South Korea (Arts & Culture and Tourism), Radio music program MC, Songwriter
- Instruments: Vocals, violin
- Years active: 2001–present
- Labels: Telstar Records UK 2012, Mnet, Warner Music Group, CJ E & M, S2S Sense Music, Rose Music
- Website: rosejang.com

Rose Jang is a Korean-American pop opera singer who is well known for singing operatic arias, musical and classic pop songs (3.5 octave range to high F). She is the first Korean to release an album comprising operatic arias as well as hit musical songs. She performed with the Rose Pops Orchestra at Lincoln Center for the Performing Arts Alice Tully Hall on November 9, 2011, to promote Jeju Island as one of the New 7 Wonders of Nature. with South Korean President Lee Myung-bak's blessing for a great show. She currently records in New York City, Seoul, and London.

Jang has been hailed as a heroine for Korean-Americans. Jang has been credited for one of the reasons why Jeju Island was voted to be a New 7 Wonder of Nature. She promoted Jeju Island heavily as she campaigned the New 7 Wonders of Nature with her Lincoln Center concert.

== Early life ==
Jang was born in Princeton, New Jersey, USA. She is the daughter of Daniel Jang who has a doctorate from Princeton University and Seoul National University. Her mother, Carolyn Bok Jang, immigrated to New York City from South Korea and worked for painter Salvatore Dali and was a model for Ford Models. Her grandfather, Dr. Young-Chul Jang was a president of Choongbuk National University. At the age of four, Rose was admitted into The Manhattan School of Music's children's program. There, she received lessons in music for the piano, violin and voice. She also served as concertmaster for her Bridgewater-Raritan High School. She performed the violin as part of the New Jersey Youth Symphony. She performed with the New Jersey Youth Symphony at Carnegie Hall at the age of 17. She is a graduate of Smith College. She has also studied at Goldsmiths College in London. Jang is a member of the Princeton Korean Church which is a Christian Presbyterian Church located in Princeton, New Jersey. She is fluent in English, Korean, and French.

== Awards and achievements ==
Jang has won a number of awards for her accomplishments in music including the award for "Outstanding Vocalist" in the "Classical" category at the South Korean Entertainment Awards. Awards were given to sixty of Korea's leading music, film, and performing arts icons. Jang was also awarded "Most Successful Artist" of 2009 at the Seoul Success Awards. She received the "special" award at Asia's largest music festival "The Asia Song Festival". Jang has performed at major events including the inaugural ceremony of South Korean President Lee Myung Bak and an event celebrating U.N. Secretary General Ban Ki-Moon. She also has performed at Pridefest in Milwaukee, Wisconsin where she performed alongside legendary R&B vocalist Patti LaBelle who said that Rose has "an absolutely beautiful voice and is an amazing performer.

Jang reached number one on the domestic and international music charts with her performance of the song "Memory" from the Cats (musical).

Jang has broken the record for most weeks at #1 on the Korean classical chart with her rendition of "You Raise Me Up" from the "Songs of Hope" series.

Jang in 2008 performed at the inauguration of former South Korean president Lee-Myung Bak.

In June 2010 Jang was chosen as one of Korea's "10 Most Shining Stars" by Arirang Television Network. Arirang (TV network), a popular network in Asia, aired a documentary of her life in music that was broadcast in 170 countries around the world reaching an audience of 150 million people. The documentary Koreans on the World Stage aired on December 29, 2012. Jang was also featured on Korea's SBS hit TV show Star King where she performed as a "Special Guest."

Jang is a former spokes-model for Lancome cosmetics and was featured in Elle, Vogue, and Marie Claire magazines.

In September 2012, Rose was featured in Korea's Cosmopolitan Magazine as the "10 Most Powerful Korean Women in New York."

== Ambassador career ==
Jang is currently working on a project that will allow her to promote Korean culture globally. As an official Ambassador for Korean Tourism, she plans to adapt traditional folk songs for English listeners. She then plans to perform traditional Korean folk songs in English at concert halls around the world. On February 24, 2010, she debuted these rearranged Korean folk songs at the Seoul Arts Center.

She has also performed during the 2010 South Africa World Cup in Johannesburg. During the 2010 World Cup in South Africa, Jang performed in Johannesburg for six of the top twenty four representatives of FIFA in order to promote the bidding for the World Cup to take place in Korea in the year 2022 in which she performed solo alongside soprano Sumi Jo. She has also performed at the World Cup in 2006 as well as many friendly and World Cup qualifying games.

Jang has performed with autistic children for her solo concerts and many of her solo concerts are in conjunction with South Korea's largest autistic foundation "Eden Welfare Foundation". She has performed with clarinet player Woojin Kim for two of her Seoul Art Center concerts.
