= Someone to Watch Over Me (album) =

Studio album by Susan Boyle
- Released: 1 November 2011
- Recorded: 2010–2011
- Genres: Operatic pop; adult contemporary; crossover
- Length: 33:36
- Labels: Syco; Columbia (US)
- Producer: Steve Mac

Susan Boyle chronology
| The Gift (2010) | Someone to Watch Over Me (2011) | Standing Ovation: The Greatest Songs from the Stage (2012) |

Singles from Someone to Watch Over Me
- 1. "You Have to Be There" Released: 20 September 2011; 2. "Enjoy the Silence" Released: 30 September 2011; 3. "Unchained Melody" Released: 14 October 2011; 4. "Autumn Leaves" Released: 25 October 2011

Professional ratings
Aggregate scores
| Source | Rating |
|---|---|
| Metacritic | 56/100 |
Review scores
| Source | Rating |
| AllMusic | 3/5 stars |

Someone to Watch Over Me is the third album by Scottish singer Susan Boyle, released on 7 November 2011 in the United Kingdom and 1 November 2011 in the United States. The album has been described as a "diverse mix of music" which includes songs inspired by the stories of Boyle's fans who write letters to her.

== Background ==
Boyle announced the album title and release date on 1 September 2011, on the semi-final results show of America's Got Talent, after performing a track from "You Have to Be There". The song was written by ABBA members Benny Andersson and Björn Ulvaeus, from their musical Kristina från Duvemåla. After Boyle performed on America's Got Talent she said: "I was also a little nervous introducing something new. America's Got Talent - it's where I started with my first album, so it was wonderful to be back and for the support."

== Commercial performance ==
In the United Kingdom, the album debuted in the top position of the UK Albums Chart, her third consecutive album to do so. It sold 72,000 copies in its debut week. As of 22 December 2011, the album has sold 416,000 copies in the US.

In Australia, the album debuted in the top position of the Australian Album Chart, so far it has been certified double platinum.

In the United States, the album debuted at number four on the Billboard 200, becoming her third top five album on the chart. It sold 132,000 copies in its first week. In its second week, the album was number seven selling 72,000 copies.

== Track listing ==
| No. | Title | Writer(s) | Original artist | Length |
|---|---|---|---|---|
| 1. | "You Have to Be There" | Benny Andersson, Björn Ulvaeus | Helen Sjöholm, from Kristina från Duvemåla | 3:53 |
| 2. | "Unchained Melody" | Hy Zaret, Alex North | Todd Duncan, from Unchained | 3:47 |
| 3. | "Enjoy the Silence" | Martin Gore | Depeche Mode | 4:11 |
| 4. | "Both Sides, Now" | Joni Mitchell | Joni Mitchell | 3:29 |
| 5. | "Lilac Wine" | James Shelton | Hope Foye, from Dance Me a Song | 3:15 |
| 6. | "Mad World" | Roland Orzabal | Tears for Fears | 4:00 |
| 7. | "Autumn Leaves" | Jim Duguidi, Paolo Nutini | Paolo Nutini | 2:54 |
| 8. | "This Will Be the Year" | Emeli Sandé, Josh Kear, Shahid Khan | Original Composition | 3:53 |
| 9. | "Return" | Steve Mac, Wayne Hector | Original Composition | 2:58 |
| 10. | "Someone to Watch Over Me" | George Gershwin, Ira Gershwin | Gertrude Lawrence, from Oh, Kay! | 1:17 |

Japanese bonus tracks
| No. | Title | Writer(s) | Length |
|---|---|---|---|
| 11. | "Ue o Muite Arukō/The First Star" | Rokusuke Ei, Hachidai Nakamura | 4:01 |
| 12. | "Third Man Theme" | Anton Karas | 1:22 |

QVC bonus CD
| No. | Title | Writer(s) | Length |
|---|---|---|---|
| 1. | "Don't Give Up on Me" | Dan Penn, Carson Whitsett, Hoy Lindsey |
| 2. | "You Are My Sunshine" | Jimmie Davis, Charles Mitchell |
| 3. | "Perfect Day" | Lou Reed | 4:31 |
| 4. | "I Dreamed a Dream" | Claude-Michel Schönberg, Alain Boublil, Herbert Kretzmer | 4:33 |

- The album is also available in a Special Edition that features a bonus DVD with music videos of the songs "You Have to Be There", "Unchained Melody", "Autumn Leaves", and "Perfect Day".

== Charts ==
=== Weekly charts ===
| Chart (2011) | Peak position |
|---|---|
| Australian Albums (ARIA) | 1 |
| Belgian Albums (Ultratop Flanders) | 4 |
| Belgian Albums (Ultratop Wallonia) | 39 |
| Canadian Albums (Billboard) | 6 |
| Danish Albums (Hitlisten) | 36 |
| Dutch Albums (Album Top 100) | 18 |
| Finnish Albums (Suomen virallinen lista) | 38 |
| French Albums (SNEP) | 145 |
| Greek Albums (IFPI) | 17 |
| Hungarian Albums (MAHASZ) | 34 |
| Irish Albums (IRMA) | 11 |
| New Zealand Albums (RMNZ) | 2 |
| Norwegian Albums (VG-lista) | 20 |
| Scottish Albums (Official Charts) | 1 |
| Swedish Albums (Sverigetopplistan) | 9 |
| Swiss Albums (Schweizer Hitparade) | 47 |
| UK Albums (Official Charts) | 1 |
| US Billboard 200 | 4 |

=== Year-end charts ===
| Chart (2011) | Position |
|---|---|
| Australian Albums (ARIA) | 7 |
| Belgian Albums (Ultratop Flanders) | 70 |
| Swedish Albums (Sverigetopplistan) | 59 |
| UK Albums (OCC) | 33 |
| US Billboard 200 | 156 |

| Chart (2012) | Position |
|---|---|
| Canadian Albums (Billboard) | 35 |
| US Billboard 200 | 94 |

=== Decade-end charts ===
| Chart (2010–2019) | Position |
|---|---|
| Australian Albums (ARIA) | 86 |

== Certifications ==
| Region | Certification | Certified units/sales |
|---|---|---|
| Australia (ARIA) | 2× Platinum | 140,000^{^} |
| Belgium (BRMA) | Gold | 15,000^{*} |
| Ireland (IRMA) | Gold | 7,500^{^} |
| New Zealand (RMNZ) | Platinum | 15,000^{^} |
| United Kingdom (BPI) | Platinum | 300,000^{*} |
| United States (RIAA) | Gold | 500,000^{^} |
^{*} Sales figures based on certification alone.^{^} Shipments figures based on certification alone.

== Release history ==
| Region | Date | Format | Label |
|---|---|---|---|
| United Kingdom | 7 November 2011 | CD, digital download | Syco Music, Sony Music Entertainment |
| United States | 1 November 2011 | CD, digital download | Columbia Records |
| Japan | 2 November 2011 | CD, digital download | Sony Music |
| Germany | 4 November 2011 | CD, digital download | Syco, Sony Music |
