= Susan Boyle =

Scottish singer (born 1961)

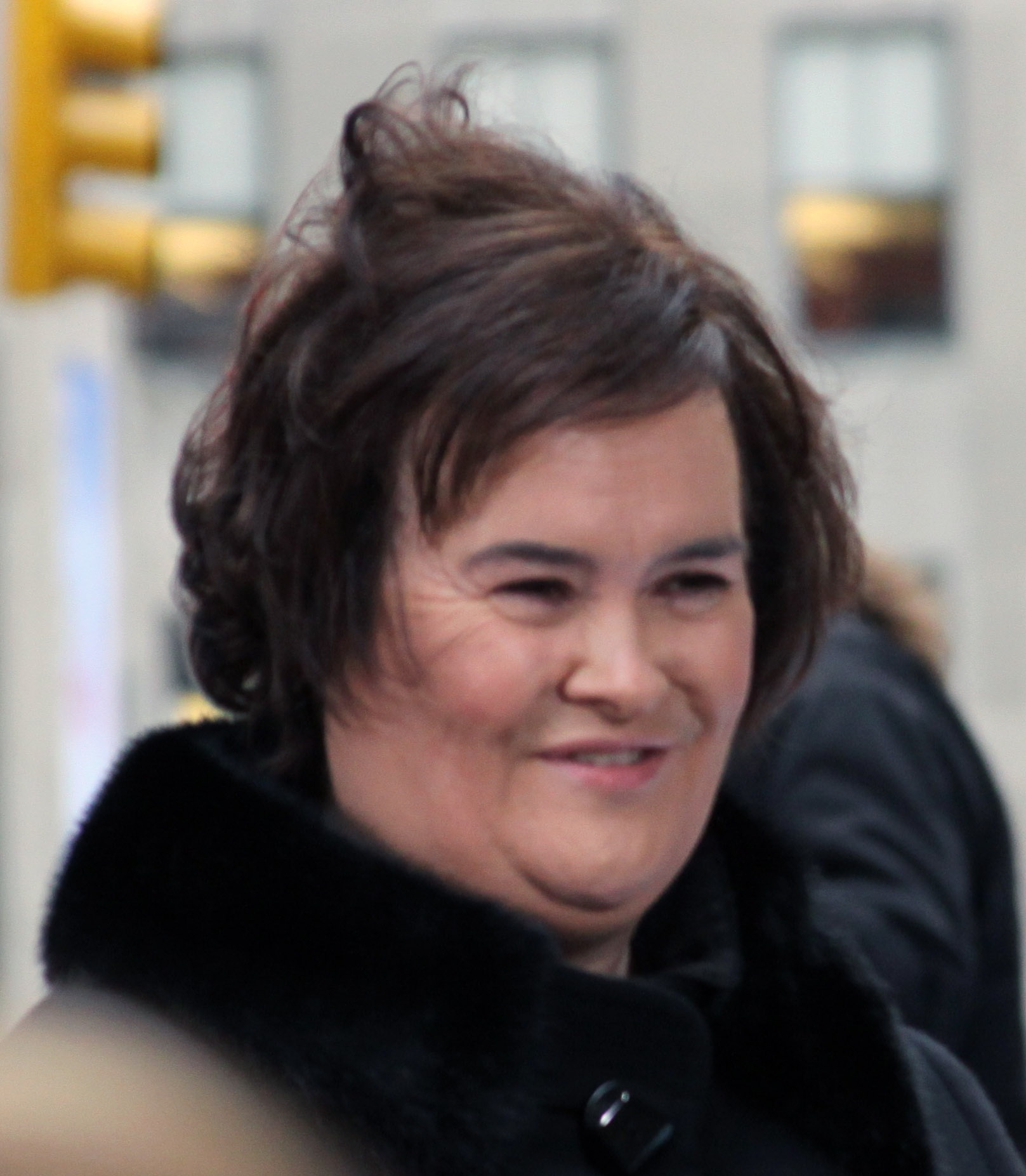
- Boyle in November 2009

Background information
- Born: Susan Magdalane Boyle; 1 April 1961 (age 65); Dechmont, West Lothian, Scotland
- Origin: Blackburn, West Lothian, Scotland
- Genre: Operatic pop
- Occupations: Singer
- Years active: 1998–present
- Labels: Sony Music; Syco; Columbia
- Website: susanboylemusic.com

Susan Magdalane Boyle (born 1 April 1961) is a Scottish singer. She rose to fame in 2009 as a contestant on the third series of the television talent competition Britain's Got Talent, where she finished as runner-up. Following the show, Boyle was signed to Syco Music in the United Kingdom and Columbia Records in the United States.

Boyle's debut album, I Dreamed a Dream (2009), became the UK's best-selling debut album of all time and set a record for first-week sales by a debut album. In her first year of fame, Boyle made £5 million (£8.0 million today) with the release of I Dreamed a Dream and its lead-off singles, "I Dreamed a Dream" and "Wild Horses". The success continued with her second album, The Gift (2010), where she became only the third act ever (and the first female artist) to top both the UK and US album charts with two different albums in the same year. In 2011, she released her third album, Someone to Watch Over Me (2011), and released a cover version of "I Know Him So Well" with Geraldine McQueen. The following year, Boyle released a version of "The Winner Takes It All" as the lead single from her fourth album, Standing Ovation: The Greatest Songs from the Stage (2012).

Boyle's life and success was the subject to the musical theatre production I Dreamed a Dream: The Musical (2012). She recorded a posthumous duet with Elvis Presley, "O Come, All Ye Faithful" for her Christmas themed album, Home for Christmas (2013). Following the release of her sixth album, Hope (2014), and her seventh album, A Wonderful World (2016), Boyle took a hiatus. In 2019, for her ten-year anniversary for her career, she launched a compilation album titled Ten together with a tour. During this period, Boyle continued to keep a low profile amongst health concerns and complications, including suffering a stroke in 2022. In 2025, Boyle returned to the recording studio and announced her comeback.

Considered a "significant figure in the music industry" and one of the most successful recording artists of the 21st century, Boyle's accolades include two Grammy Award and Billboard Music Award nominations, a World Music Award, a Japan Gold Disc Award, a Scottish Music Award and the recipient of three Guinness World Records. As of 2021, she had sold over 25 million records worldwide. As of May 2025, her estimated net worth was £22 million ($29.5 million).

== Early life ==
Boyle grew up in Blackburn, West Lothian, Scotland. Her father, Patrick Boyle, was a miner and veteran of World War II and her mother Bridget was a shorthand typist. Both of her parents were born in Motherwell, Scotland, but also had family links to County Donegal in Ireland. Born when her mother was aged 45 years, she was the youngest of four brothers and five sisters. She grew up thinking that she had been briefly deprived of oxygen during a difficult birth resulting in a learning disability. However, she was told in 2012–13 that she had been misdiagnosed and is on the autism spectrum with an IQ "above average". She says she was bullied as a child. After leaving school with few qualifications, she took part in government training programmes, and performed at local venues.

== Career ==
=== Early training and career (1998–2008) ===
Boyle took singing lessons from vocal coach Fred O'Neil. She attended Edinburgh Acting School and took part in the Edinburgh Fringe. She also long participated in her parish church's pilgrimages to the Knock Shrine, County Mayo, Ireland, and sang there at the Marian basilica. In 1995, she auditioned for Michael Barrymore's My Kind of People.

In 1998, Boyle recorded three tracks—"Cry Me a River", "Killing Me Softly" and "Don't Cry for Me Argentina"—at Heartbeat Studio, Midlothian. She used all her savings to pay for a professionally cut demo, copies of which she later sent to record companies, radio talent competitions, local and national TV. The demo consisted of her versions of "Cry Me a River" and "Killing Me Softly with His Song"; the songs were uploaded to the Internet after her BGT audition.

In 1999, Boyle submitted a track for a charity CD to commemorate the Millennium produced at a West Lothian school. Only 1,000 copies of the CD, Music for a Millennium Celebration, Sounds of West Lothian, were pressed. An early review by Amber McNaught in the West Lothian Herald & Post said Boyle's rendition of "Cry Me a River" was "heartbreaking" and "had been on repeat in my CD player ever since I got this CD..." The recording found its way onto the internet following her first televised appearance. Hello! said the recording "cement[ed] her status" as a singing star.

After Boyle won several local singing competitions, her mother urged her to enter Britain's Got Talent and take the risk of singing in front of an audience larger than her parish church. Former coach O'Neil said Boyle abandoned an audition for The X Factor because she believed people were being chosen for their looks. She almost abandoned her plan to enter Britain's Got Talent, believing she was too old, but O'Neil persuaded her to audition nevertheless. Boyle said that she was motivated to seek a musical career to pay tribute to her mother. Her performance on the show was the first time she had sung in public since her mother died.

=== Britain's Got Talent (2008–2009) ===
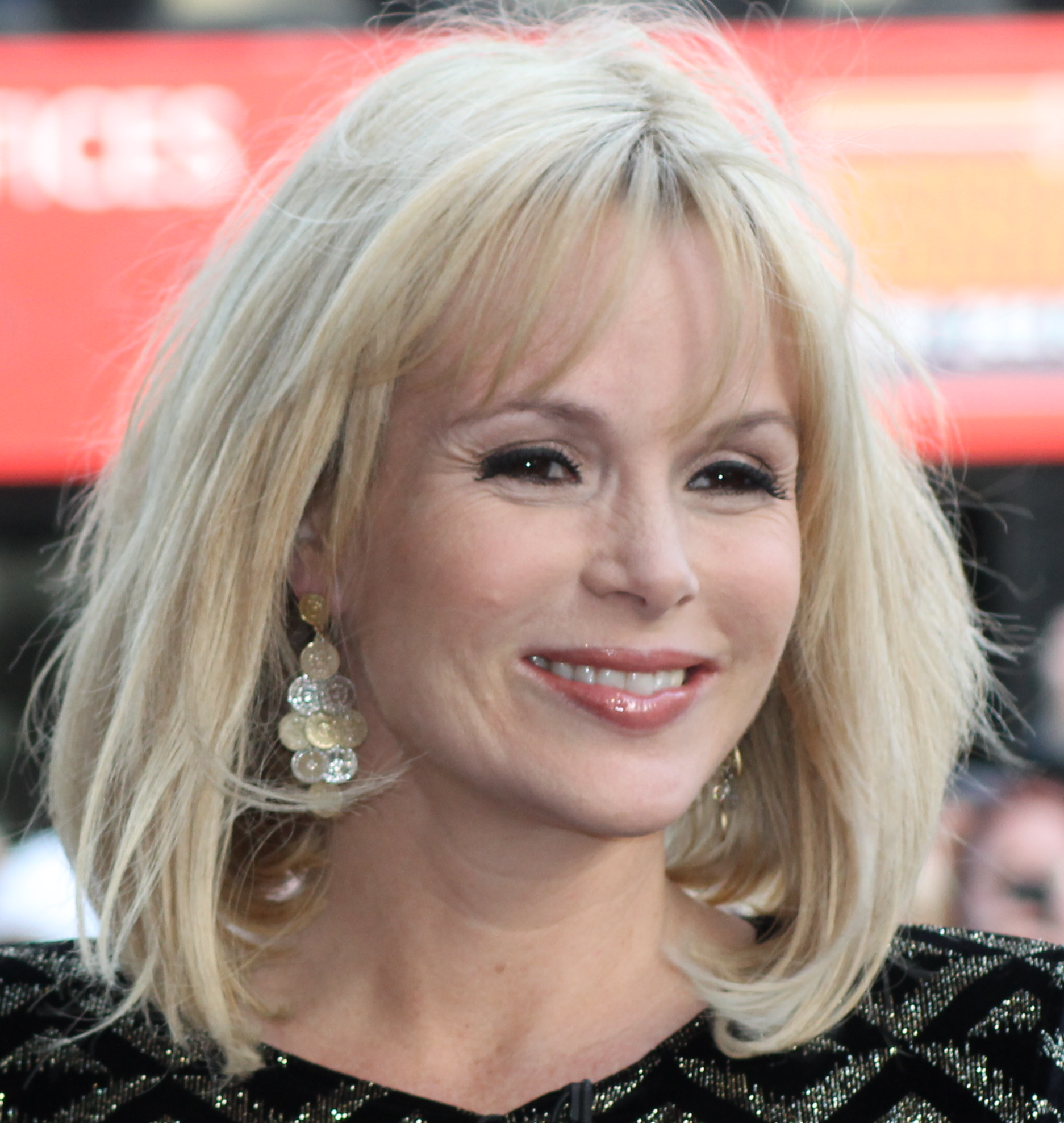
Britain's Got Talent Amanda Holden (pictured) claimed Boyle's audition was the "biggest wake up call ever".

In August 2008, Boyle applied for an audition for the third series of Britain's Got Talent (as contestant number 43212) and was accepted after a preliminary audition in Glasgow. When Boyle first appeared on Britain's Got Talent at the city's Clyde Auditorium, she said that she aspired to become a professional singer "as successful as Elaine Paige". Boyle sang "I Dreamed a Dream" from Les Misérables in the first round, which was watched by over 10 million viewers when it aired on 11 April 2009. Programme judge Amanda Holden remarked upon the audience's initially cynical attitude and the subsequent "biggest wake-up call ever" upon hearing her performance.

Boyle was "absolutely gobsmacked" by the strength of the reaction to her audition. Afterwards, Paige expressed interest in singing a duet with Boyle, and called her "a role model for everyone who has a dream". Boyle's rendition of "I Dreamed a Dream" was credited with causing a surge in ticket sales in the Vancouver production of Les Misérables. Cameron Mackintosh, the producer of the musical, also praised the performance, as "heart-touching, thrilling and uplifting".

Boyle was one of 40 acts that were put through to the semi-finals. She appeared last on the first semi-final on 24 May 2009, performing "Memory" from the musical Cats. In the public vote, she was the act to receive the highest number of votes to go through to the final. She was the clear favourite to win the final, but ended up in second place to dance troupe Diversity; the UK TV audience was a record of 17.3 million viewers.

I know what they were thinking, but why should it matter as long as I can sing? It's not a beauty contest.

— Susan Boyle, The Sunday Times

The Press Complaints Commission (PCC) became concerned by press reports about Boyle's erratic behaviour and speculation about her mental condition and wrote to remind editors about clause 3 (privacy) of their code of press conduct. The day after the final, Boyle was admitted to The Priory, a private psychiatric clinic in London. Talkback Thames explained, "Following Saturday night's show, Susan is exhausted and emotionally drained." Her stay in hospital attracted widespread attention, with Prime Minister Gordon Brown wishing her well. Simon Cowell offered to waive Boyle's contractual obligation to take part in the BGT tour. Her family said "she's been battered non-stop for the last seven weeks and it has taken its toll [...but...] her dream is very much alive", as she had been invited to the Independence Day celebrations at the White House.

Boyle left the clinic three days after her admission and said she would participate in the BGT tour. Despite health concerns, she appeared in 20 of the 24 dates of the tour, and was well received in cities including Aberdeen, Edinburgh, Dublin, Sheffield, Coventry, and Birmingham. The Belfast Telegraph stated that "Despite reports of crumbling under the pressure..., she exuded a confidence resembling that of a veteran who has been performing for years".

=== I Dreamed a Dream and breakthrough (2009–2010) ===
Boyle's first album, I Dreamed a Dream, was released on 23 November 2009. The album includes covers of "Wild Horses" and "You'll See" as well as "I Dreamed a Dream" and "Cry Me a River". In Britain, Boyle's debut album was recognised as the fastest selling UK debut album of all time selling 411,820 copies, beating the previous fastest selling debut of all time, Spirit by Leona Lewis. I Dreamed a Dream also outsold the rest of the top 5 albums combined in its first week.

In the US, the album sold 701,000 copies in its first week, the best opening week for a debut artist in over a decade. It topped the Billboard chart for six straight weeks and although it narrowly failed to become the best-selling album of 2009, with sales of 3,104,000 compared to 3,217,000 for Taylor Swift's Fearless, it was one of only two albums to sell over 3 million copies in the US that year. It was also the top-selling "physical" album of 2009, with only 86,000 of its sales coming from digital downloads. This in turn garnered more media attention, as mentioned by People magazine. In only a week, it sold more than 2 million copies worldwide, becoming the fastest selling global female debut album.

In November 2009, it was reported that Boyle's rendition of "I Dreamed a Dream" would be the theme song of the anime movie Eagle Talon The Movie 3, which was released in Japan on 16 January 2010. Boyle performed for Pope Benedict XVI on his tour of Britain in 2010. On 13 December 2009 she appeared in her own television special I Dreamed a Dream: the Susan Boyle Story, featuring a duet with Elaine Paige. It got ratings of 10 million viewers in the United Kingdom and in America was the TV Guide Network's highest rated television special in its history. In May 2010, Boyle was voted by Time magazine as the seventh most influential person in the world. Boyle's original song "Who I Was Born to Be" was the theme song of anime film Welcome to the Space Show, which opened in Japan on 26 June 2010.

=== Global dominance, acting and tour (2010–2014) ===
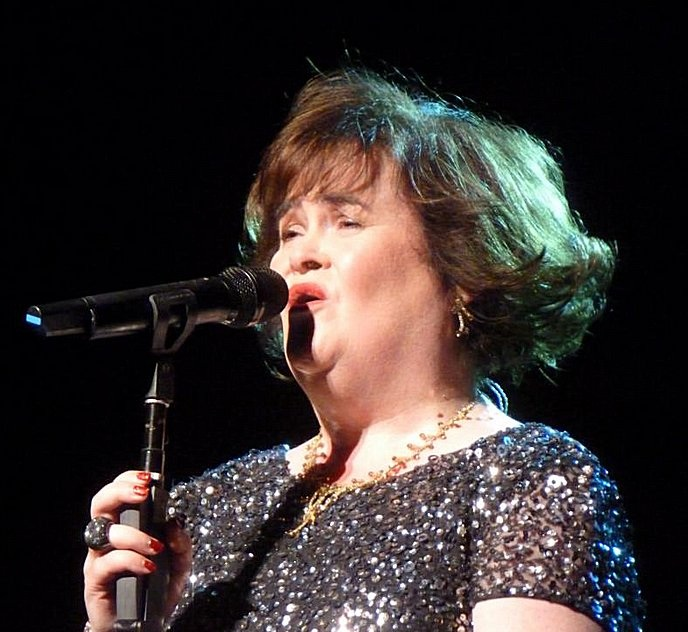
Boyle performing at the Edinburgh Festival Theatre during her first concert tour, Susan Boyle in Concert, July 2013

On 9 July 2010, Boyle announced that her second album would be a Christmas album titled The Gift. As part of the lead-up to the album, she held a competition called Susan's Search, the winner of which sang a duet with her on her new record. The album was released on 8 November 2010.

The album was produced by Steve Mac, who said that "Now Susan's used to the studio and the recording process, this time round we might go even further down a traditional route of recording by getting a band together and rehearsing songs before we go into the studio to see what works, how she reacts with certain parts, and so we can change the arrangements that way. I think that's going to work much better....With Susan it's very important she connects with the public and the public connect with her. She doesn't want to sing anything that hasn't happened to her or she can't relate to."

In October 2010, Boyle's autobiography The Woman I Was Born to Be – My Story was published. By November 2010, The Gift reached the top of both the UK and US album charts. This made Boyle the first woman and third ever performer to reach the top of both charts for two different albums in less than a year. The others are the Beatles and Monkees. On 30 November 2010, in the United States, Boyle performed on ABC's The View singing "O Holy Night" and then on NBC's Christmas at Rockefeller Center programme performing "Perfect Day" and "Away in a Manger". Boyle performed on the second semi-final results show of the sixth season of America's Got Talent, which aired on 31 August 2011. Her third studio album, Someone to Watch Over Me, was released the same year.

Boyle released her fourth album Standing Ovation: The Greatest Songs from the Stage in November 2012. She reportedly took piano lessons as she planned on playing it for the album. A reporter told The Sun, "Susan loves the piano and always dreamed of being able to reach a standard which would allow her to play on stage and on her albums." In October 2012 renowned opera star Plácido Domingo released his album Songs, which included a duet with Boyle of Shania Twain's "From This Moment On". Boyle made her first acting appearance as Eleanor Hopewell in The Christmas Candle. The film is based on a book written by Max Lucado about a 19th-century village of simple people in the English Cotswolds in need of a miracle. The film was released on 22 November 2013 in the US and 29 November 2013 in the UK. Speaking of her first acting role, Boyle said, "I can't believe I'm making a film. I'm very excited to be a part of The Christmas Candle. Everyone on set is a delight to work with and it's a fantastic experience to be part of the team."

In the film Boyle sings an original song, "Miracle Hymn", the anthem for the film and a track from her album Home for Christmas, which also featured a duet with Elvis Presley singing "O Come All Ye Faithful". The album was released on 29 October 2013 in the U.S. Previously in television, Boyle starred as herself in I Dreamed a Dream: The Susan Boyle Story and in a 2011 documentary titled Susan Boyle: An Unlikely Superstar. She starred in a second documentary titled There's Something About Susan in the UK, which first aired on ITV on 12 December 2013. It aired in the US on Ovation Channel under the title Susan Boyle Her Secret Struggle with the premiere on 9 April 2014. In October 2013 American vocalist Johnny Mathis released an album titled Sending You a Little Christmas. The album includes "Do You Hear What I Hear?", a duet performed with Boyle.

=== Continued success (2014–2019) ===
Boyle performing for Pope Francis at the Vatican City, 2019

Boyle released her sixth album, Hope, in October 2014 in the US and in November 2014 in the UK. The album, whose theme is hope and inspiration, includes a recorded live performance by Boyle of "You Raise Me Up" with the Lakewood Church choir. Hope mostly contains renditions of classic ballad song, as well as uptempo songs themed around inspiration and hope as Boyle sees those as the "two elements we all need in our life to drive us forward and inspire us to go out and capture our dreams; they worked for me after all." Boyle stated that "I have really enjoyed making this album. I had a huge input in music suggestions and finally have been able to record one of my all time favourites, "Angel", originally by Sarah Mclachlan. I also am pleased to be able to sing some uptempo songs that show variation in my repertoire."

The album debuted at number 16 on the Billboard 200 in the United States, becoming Susan Boyle's sixth consecutive top 20 album there. The album spent 35 weeks at No. 1 on the Billboard Top Inspirational Albums chart. It has sold 115,000 copies in the United States as of November 2016. The album spent 35 weeks at number 1 on the Billboard Top Inspirational Albums chart.

Boyle performed at the 2014 Commonwealth Games opening ceremony in Glasgow, Scotland performing "Mull of Kintyre" after the arrival of Queen Elizabeth II, Head of the Commonwealth.

After the release of a previous album, Hope in 2014, Boyle took a break during 2015 to "take a little me time and spend time at home with family and friends". Thus the recording of her seventh studio album was postponed to 2016. In October 2016, Boyle announced the release of her seventh studio album, A Wonderful World. In September 2018, Boyle was confirmed to be a contestant in America's Got Talent: The Champions. When asked why she joined the competition, she stated that she wanted to win this time. She performed on 7 January 2019, singing "Wild Horses" from her 2009 debut album I Dreamed a Dream and received a golden buzzer from judge Mel B. She progressed straight to the finals where she sang the song "I Dreamed a Dream" from her original audition back in 2009, but failed to finish in the top five.

=== Ten and hiatus (2019–2025) ===
Boyle's first compilation album, Ten, was released on 31 May 2019 and features a duet with Michael Ball on the track "A Million Dreams". On 21 August 2019, Boyle performed on the results show for season 14 of America's Got Talent. Boyle's English-language cover of the Japanese folk song "Wings to Fly" was played during the release of the doves at the 2020 Tokyo Olympics Opening Ceremony in 2021. In March 2020, Boyle embarked on her second tour, The Ten Tour, to promote the release of the compilation album. The tour commenced in Boyle's native Scotland in the city of Dundee and featured shows within various concert halls and theatres across the United Kingdom.

Speaking ahead of her first concert tour in four years, Boyle said she was "thrilled to be coming back on tour after four years and starting in Scotland, one of the best audiences in the world", adding that people could expect songs to be performed that they would not "necessarily expect from me", stating that she "likes to surprise, I left the world surprised ten years ago and I want to surprise my fans again". Boyle was scheduled to perform in Birmingham at the Birmingham Symphony Hall on 17 March 2020, however, was cancelled along with the remaining dates of The Ten Tour as a result of the outbreak of the COVID-19 pandemic in the United Kingdom.

Boyle kept a relatively low profile following the release of Ten in 2019. In 2023, Boyle announced that she had suffered a stroke the previous year.

=== Return, Just One and brand partnership (2025–present) ===
Boyle marked a return to social media on 1 April 2025 following an absence of two years. In a post to Instagram, Boyle, through a recorded video, announced new projects that she was "excited to share" and indicated forthcoming music releases. Boyle had returned to vocal training exercises once she felt able to do so following recent health conditions. Furthermore, Boyle announced via her Instagram page that she had "made my return to the recording studio for the first time in six years", saying that this was "something I was told I might never achieve again".

In June 2026, Boyle posted on her Instagram account that a "new era" was about to begin following speculation of a makeover. She released her first single in twelve years, "Just One (ReMAXed)" which features as part of the Cornetto's summer advertisement campaign. Explaining her decision about the brand partnership with Cornetto, Boyle explained that she often gets "contacted about brand work", and said "this one really appealed". Describing the song, Boyle claimed that it "is the type of song which makes you feel good, I never thought I would hear myself in a dance track". On 5 June 2026, Boyle appeared in an advertisement for Irn-Bru's 2026 FIFA World Cup campaign "No Scotland, No Party". Using special effects, Boyle appeared atop of the Forth Road Bridge and breakdances.

== Public image ==
=== Media impact ===
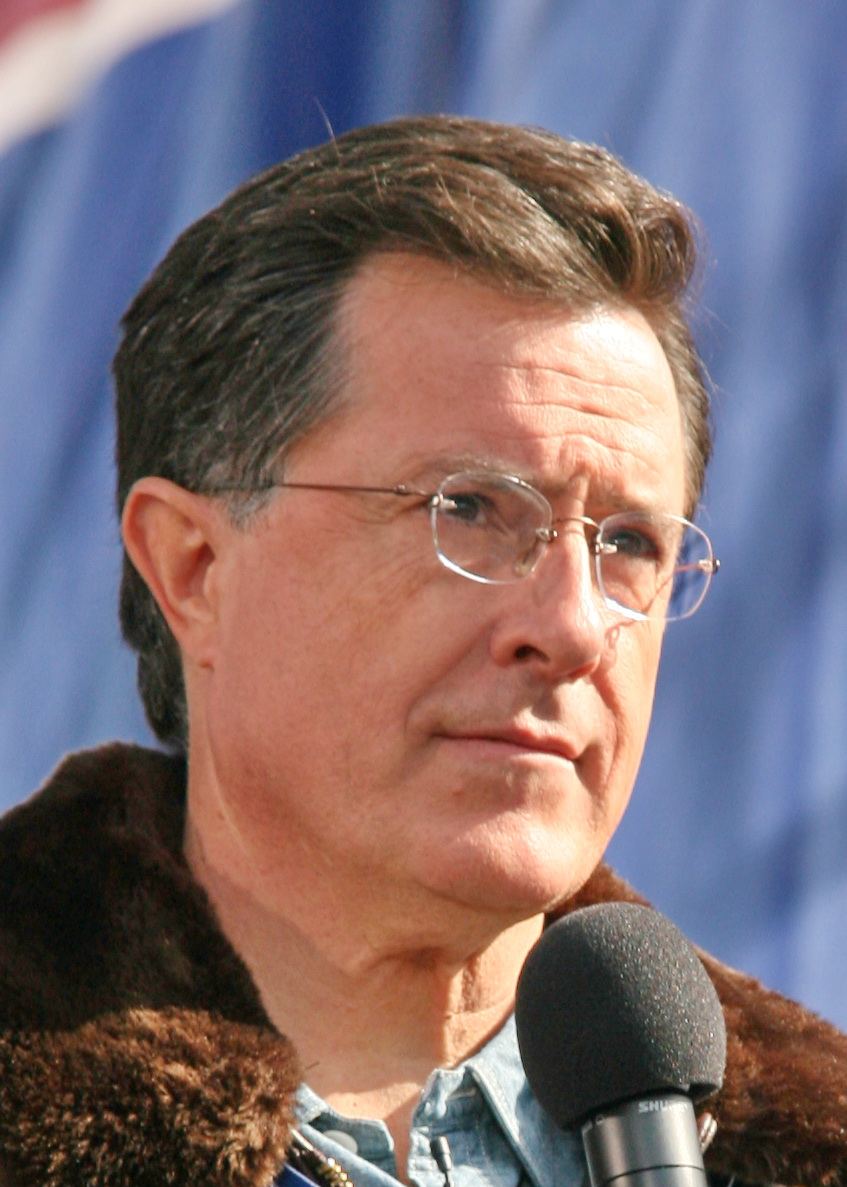
2010 Grammy Awards host Stephen Colbert (pictured) paid tribute to Boyle despite her being ineligible for nomination that year.

Websites such as YouTube, Facebook and Twitter have been crucial in facilitating Boyle's rapid rise to fame. The most popular YouTube video submission of her audition garnered nearly 2.5 million views in the first 72 hours. On the day following the performance, the YouTube video was the most popular article on Digg. Within a week, the audition performance had been viewed more than 66 million times, setting an online record, while on Wikipedia her biography attracted nearly half a million page views. A total of 103 million video views on 20 websites was reached within nine days. The Los Angeles Times wrote that her popularity on YouTube may in part be due to the broad range of emotion packed into a short clip which was "perfect for the Internet". In December 2009, her audition was named the most-watched YouTube video of the year, with over 120 million viewings, more than three times higher than the second-most-popular video.

Additionally, Boyle's first on-camera interview with Scots journalist Richard Mooney for her local newspaper the West Lothian Courier was named as YouTube's Most Memorable Video of 2009. The video went viral after being uploaded to YouTube on 14 April 2009, amassing more than 5.4 million views as of November 2022.

Many newspapers around the world (including China, Brazil and the Middle East) carried articles on Boyle's performance. Later, the British press took to referring to her by a short-form of her name, 'SuBo'. In the US, several commentators drew parallels between Boyle's performance and that of Paul Potts. ABC News hailed "Britain's newest pop sensation", while its entertainment section headlined Boyle as "The Woman Who Shut Up Simon Cowell".

Within the week following her performance on Britain's Got Talent, Boyle was a guest on STV's The Five Thirty Show. She was interviewed via satellite on CBS's The Early Show, NBC's Today, FOX's America's Newsroom, The Oprah Winfrey Show and via satellite on Larry King Live; she was also portrayed in drag by Jay Leno, who joked that they were related through his mother's Scottish heritage.

At the invitation of NHK, a major Japanese broadcaster, Boyle appeared as a guest singer for the 2009 edition of Kōhaku Uta Gassen, an annual songfest on New Year's Eve in Tokyo, Japan. She was introduced as the ōen kashu (応援歌手, lit. "cheering singer") by the MCs and appeared on the stage escorted by Takuya Kimura; she sang "I Dreamed a Dream".

Although Boyle was not eligible for the 2010 Grammy Awards, its host Stephen Colbert paid tribute to Boyle at the ceremony, telling its audience "you may be the coolest people in the world, but this year your industry was saved by a 48-year-old Scottish cat lady in sensible shoes." There was also earlier controversy when Boyle was not nominated in any of the categories for the 2010 Brit Awards.

=== Stage musical ===
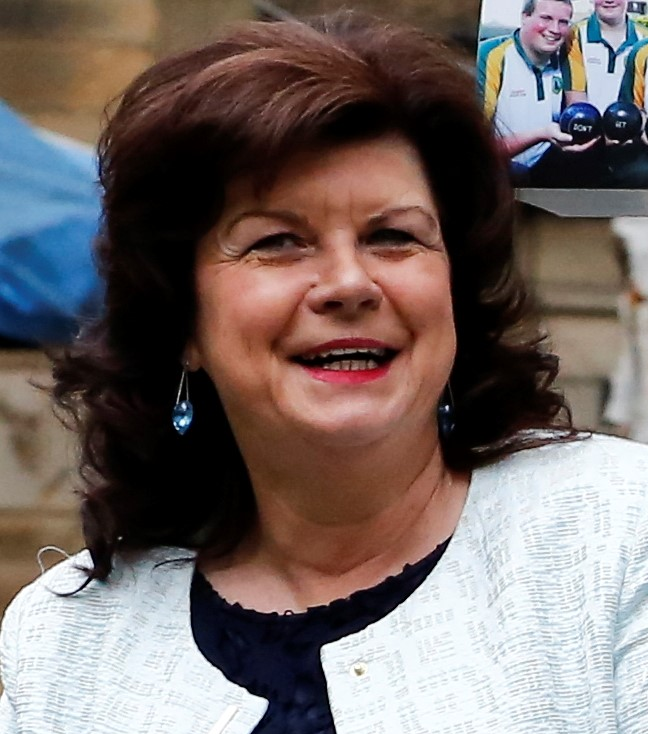
Boyle was portrayed by Scottish actress Elaine C. Smith (pictured) in the I Dreamed a Dream stage musical.

A stage musical of Boyle's life was originally planned with Boyle appearing as herself. She said she hated "having to sit watching people up there" who are actors. However it was later decided that actress Elaine C. Smith would portray her and that Boyle would join the cast of I Dreamed a Dream for a cameo appearance.

I Dreamed a Dream opened on 27 March 2012 with fans from all over the world occupying the Theatre Royal, Newcastle, for the opening week. The musical received generally warm reviews. The musical toured the UK and Ireland in 2012.

Boyle said she was initially upset by the show, because she was "not used to it". She called it "surreal", but later changed her mind and found it "clever and amusing".

Fox Searchlight has bought life rights to Boyle along with rights to the musical I Dreamed a Dream. Fox plans to develop a film version of the musical.

=== Social analyses ===
==== Judging by appearance ====
The Huffington Post noted that the producers of the show would have anticipated the potential of this story arc by deliberately presenting Boyle in a manner that would enhance this initial reaction. The Herald described Boyle's story as a modern parable and a rebuke to people's tendency to judge others based on their physical appearance. Similarly, Entertainment Weekly said that Boyle's performance was a victory for talent and artistry in a culture obsessed with physical attractiveness and presentation. In an interview with The Washington Post, Boyle said:

Modern society is too quick to judge people on their appearances. ... There is not much you can do about it; it is the way they think; it is the way they are. But maybe this could teach them a lesson, or set an example.

The Washington Post believed that her initial demeanour and homely appearance caused the judges and audience to be "waiting for her to squawk like a duck". New York's Daily News said that an underdog being ridiculed or humiliated but then enjoying an unexpected triumph is a common trope in literature, and the stark contrast between the audience's low expectations and the quality of her singing made Boyle's performance such an engaging piece of television.

==== Feminist view ====
R. M. Campbell, music critic for The Gathering Note, compared Boyle to iconic American jazz singer Ella Fitzgerald, who had a long and distinguished career despite being overweight: "[it is] really, really hard to make a career if a woman isn't attractive". In another Huffington Post article, Letty Cottin Pogrebin wrote that although people may "weep for the years of wasted talent", Boyle's performance was a triumph for "women of a certain age" over a youth culture that often dismisses middle-aged women. Tanya Gold wrote in The Guardian that the difference between Boyle's hostile reception and the more neutral response to Paul Potts in his first audition reflected society's expectation that women be both good-looking and talented, with no such expectation existing for men. Los Angeles vocal coach Eric Vetro stated, "She's an Everywoman as opposed to an untouchable fantasy goddess, so maybe that's why people react to her."

==== The "American Dream" ====
Several media sources have commented that Boyle's success seemed to have particular resonance in the United States. An American entertainment correspondent was quoted in The Scotsman comparing Boyle's story to the American Dream, as representing talent overcoming adversity and poverty. The Associated Press described this as Boyle's "hardscrabble story", dwelling on her modest lifestyle and what they characterised as urban deprivation in her home town. Similarly, The Independent's New York correspondent David Usborne wrote that the United States will always respond to "the fairy tale where the apparently unprepossessing suddenly becomes pretty, from Shrek to My Fair Lady".

== Personal life ==
Boyle still lives in her family home, a four-bedroom ex-council house in Blackburn, which she purchased from her earnings in 2010. Her father died in the 1990s and her eight siblings had left home. Boyle has never married; she dedicated herself to caring for her ageing mother until her death in 2007 at the age of 91. A neighbour reported that when Bridget Boyle died, her daughter "wouldn't come out for three or four days or answer the door or phone". Boyle is a practising Catholic and sang in the choir at her church in Blackburn. Boyle remains active as a volunteer at her church, visiting elderly members of the congregation in their homes. On a 2010 episode of The Oprah Winfrey Show, Boyle summarised that her daily life was "mundane" and "routine" prior to stardom.

In 2012, Boyle was diagnosed with Asperger syndrome; she made her diagnosis public in a BBC interview in December 2013. She is also epileptic. In November 2012, when asked if she had tried to find love through Internet dating, Boyle said she was too scared, saying: "Knowing my luck I'd go out on a date and you'd find my limbs scattered around various Blackburn dustbins!" In July 2013, Boyle endorsed the Better Together campaign to keep Scotland as part of the United Kingdom in the 2014 independence referendum. In so doing, she stated, "I am a proud, patriotic Scot, passionate about my heritage and my country. But I am not a nationalist", going on to say, "We have still been able to retain our proud identity whilst being a part of Britain."

Boyle is a teetotaller. In 2013, she was diagnosed with type 2 diabetes.

In November 2014, it was reported that Boyle was dating her first boyfriend, who was "around the same age" as she was. Boyle had a minor stroke in 2022. She revealed the news during an appearance on 4 June 2023, after her performance on Britain's Got Talent.

== Philanthropy ==
=== Charity performances ===
On 26 January 2010, Boyle sang together with other major artists on the charity recording "Everybody Hurts" put together by Simon Cowell for Haiti Relief for the victims of the Haiti earthquake. On 30 January 2010, Boyle performed at the Indsamling Charity Gala, a telethon for Haiti and Africa held at the Tivoli Concert Hall in Copenhagen, Denmark. Boyle has appeared on the three major UK charity telethons. On 19 March 2010 she sang for the Sport Relief charity on BBC One. On 18 March 2011 she sang a duet of "I Know Him So Well" with Peter Kay on Comic Relief; in addition to the television performance, the duet was sold on CD, DVD and MP3 download to raise more money for charity. The CD was number 21 on the all-time Comic Relief CDs sold. She has performed for BBC Children in Need telethon five times thus far: on 19 November 2010; on 18 November 2011, and on 16 November 2012. on 16 November 2013. on 14 November 2014.

On 10 November 2010, Boyle performed at the Pride of Britain Awards in London. On 19 March 2011 in Glasgow at the Scottish Variety Awards Boyle performed; the money raised was donated to Cash for Kids Charity. On 28 August 2013 Boyle travelled down with the Lothian Special Olympics Team to the Special Olympics Great Britain National Summer games in Bath. In the evening she performed at the Opening Ceremony of the Special Olympics GB at the Royal Crescent in Bath, England and also stayed to watch the events and hand out medals to the first day's winners.

On 14 August 2013 it was announced that Boyle would sing at the Prince & Princess of Wales Hospice 30th Anniversary Variety Performance at the Clyde Auditorium in Glasgow on 27 October 2013.

=== Community and faith ===
On 16 September 2010 Boyle sang at the Papal Mass performed for Pope Benedict XVI in Glasgow at Bellahouston Park in front of a crowd of 65,000. For three years Boyle has launched the Wee Box campaign for the Scottish Catholic International Aid Fund (SCIAF) in Glasgow, on 9 March 2011, on 21 February 2012, and on 12 February 2013. In May 2012 it was reported that Boyle would become patron of the struggling Regal Theatre, Bathgate where she first performed "I Dreamed a Dream". On 24 October 2012 Boyle, together with the West of Scotland and Edinburgh Garrison Military Wives choirs, launched the Poppy Scotland appeal on the steps of the Glasgow Royal Concert Hall.

=== Other ===
In January 2012, Boyle donated a performance dress, which she had worn on America's Got Talent on 31 August 2011, to The Laura McPhee Memorial Fund (Asthma) UK Charity. The dress was sold at auction for £521 and helped raise awareness of the charity. In July 2012 Boyle donated a performance dress designed by Suzanne Neville, which she had worn at performances in Madrid on the Ana Rosa Show on 12 February 2010 and in Paris on Vivement Dimanche on 17 February 2010. £6,523 was raised and presented to the Prince's Trust. Also in June 2013 Boyle donated for auction a performance dress which she had worn on The Oprah Show on 19 October 2010, with proceeds of the auction going to Metro Radio Newcastle England's Cash For Kids Campaign, with all funds raised going to disadvantaged kids across the region. The winning bid was £400.

Prior to performing at the International Music Festival "White Nights of St. Petersburg", at the Ice Palace in St. Petersburg, Russia, on 13 June 2013, Boyle visited Children's Hospital Number 17 and presented to the hospital a gift of an anesthetic machine. It was announced 28 October 2013 that Boyle is a new ambassador for Save the Children UK. Boyle released a music video 8 December 2013 featuring children from the FAST program singing "O Come All Ye Faithful" with Elvis Presley. All royalties will go towards Save the Children UK and money raised in the US will be donated to the Elvis Presley Charitable Foundation.

== Discography ==
- I Dreamed a Dream (2009)
- The Gift (2010)
- Someone to Watch Over Me (2011)
- Standing Ovation: The Greatest Songs from the Stage (2012)
- Home for Christmas (2013)
- Hope (2014)
- A Wonderful World (2016)

== Concert tours ==
- Susan Boyle in Concert (2013–2014)
- Ten Tour (2019–2020)

== Awards and nominations ==
Boyle has been nominated for two Grammy Awards in 2011 (53rd Grammy Awards) and 2012 (54th Grammy Awards) – Best Pop Vocal Album for I Dreamed a Dream and Best Traditional Pop Vocal Album for The Gift respectively. In 2010, she won Best New Artist International at the Japan Gold Disc Awards, the Outstanding Achievement Award at the Scottish Variety Awards in 2011 and in 2013 was awarded the Fans Choice Award at the Scottish Music Awards.
