= I Dreamed a Dream (album) =

Studio album by Susan Boyle
- Released: 23 November 2009
- Recorded: 1999, July–September 2009
- Genres: Operatic pop; crossover; easy listening
- Length: 43:00
- Labels: Syco; Columbia
- Producer: Steve Mac

Susan Boyle chronology
| I Dreamed a Dream (2009) | The Gift (2010) |

Singles from I Dreamed a Dream
- 1. "Wild Horses" Released: 15 November 2009; 2. "I Dreamed a Dream" Released: 15 April 2010; 3. "You'll See" Released: 20 June 2010; 4. "Amazing Grace" Released: 15 August 2010

I Dreamed a Dream is the debut studio album by Scottish singer Susan Boyle. It was released on 23 November 2009 by Syco Music in the United Kingdom, and by Columbia Records in the United States one day later. In the standard edition, 11 out of the 12 songs that appear on the album are cover songs, plus the original composition "Who I Was Born to Be". It quickly became the world's biggest selling album of 2009, according to IFPI. The album has sold around 10 million copies worldwide since its debut.

I Dreamed a Dream entered the UK album chart at number 1. It became the fastest-selling debut album ever in the UK, selling 411,820 copies, beating the record previously set by Spirit by Leona Lewis and outselling the rest of the top five albums combined during its first week on sale. The album remained at the top spot for four weeks, becoming the biggest selling album in the UK in 2009. In the U.S., I Dreamed a Dream debuted at No. 1 on the Billboard 200, with 701,000 copies sold in its first week, breaking the record for the highest debut by a new solo female artist in the SoundScan era (post 1991).

It became the biggest opening sales week of 2009 in the U.S., beating out Eminem's Relapse which sold 608,000. It was the second-biggest selling album of 2009 in the U.S., with 3.1 million copies sold, right behind Taylor Swift's Fearless at 3.2 million copies. In only six weeks of sales, it became the biggest selling album in the world for 2009.

== Background ==
In August 2008, Boyle applied for an audition for the third series of Britain's Got Talent (as contestant number 43212) and was accepted after a preliminary audition in Glasgow. When Boyle first appeared on the show at the city's Clyde Auditorium, she said that she aspired to become a professional singer "as successful as Elaine Paige". Upon this statement, most of the audience began to laugh. Boyle sang "I Dreamed a Dream" from Les Misérables in the first round of the third series of Britain's Got Talent, which was watched by over 10 million viewers when it aired on 11 April 2009. Programme judge Amanda Holden remarked upon the audience's initially cynical attitude, and the subsequent "biggest wake-up call ever" upon hearing her performance. Soon, the audition was widely reported and tens of millions of people viewed the video on YouTube. Boyle was "absolutely gobsmacked" by the strength of this reaction. After the appearance, Paige expressed interest in singing a duet with Boyle, calling her "a role model for everyone who has a dream".

Despite being the clear favourite to win the final, she ended up in second place to Diversity; the UK TV audience was a record of 17.3 million viewers. However, Boyle was quickly signed to Simon Cowell's record label and began the production of the album soon after the show. Cowell compiled a list of around 150 songs that had in part been accumulated from "various A&R guys" who sent them to him. He then whittled these down to 50 and presented the list to producer Steve Mac, so that he could try out the songs with Boyle to see which worked for her and which she wanted to record. They then recorded 20 songs for the album, with 12 eventually making the final cut. In an interview with HitQuarters, Mac talked about working with the singer:

"Susan had a big say in what she wanted to record. She’s an extraordinary artist – she’s an old school artist in that she can only sing what she feels in her heart. She’s not one of those singers that can make anything sound good, it’s only if she feels the passion of it and understands the lyric. It’s been a long time since I’ve worked with an artist that could do that."

== Composition ==
The album opens with a cover of the Rolling Stones' "Wild Horses" (1971), which Boyle described as "[o]ne of my personal favourites and an emotional release." She further stated that its "haunting theme" conjures up memories of her childhood amongst council estates, poverty and struggle in the first verse. Her version of the popular American torch song "Cry Me a River" had been previously recorded in 1999 for a charity CD. She also covered "You'll See" (1995), written and originally recorded by pop singer Madonna. Boyle stated that the cover of the song is her answer to the teachers who beat her regularly and the classmates who were aggressive and bullied her when she was growing up. "That was a statement I was trying to make, because I was bullied a lot at school: 'You may have done that to me when I was younger, but you can’t do it to me any more. I’m grown up now," she said. Boyle had been a volunteer at Our Lady of Lourdes church in Blackburn, West Lothian, and recorded some religious songs, including "Amazing Grace" and "How Great Thou Art", a Christian hymn based on a Swedish poem written by Carl Gustav Boberg in Sweden in 1885. The only original composition of the album is "Who I Was Born to Be", written by Audra Mae, Mark Linn-Baker, Johan Fransson, Tobias Lundgren, and Tim Larsson.

== Reception ==
Professional ratings
Aggregate scores
| Source | Rating |
|---|---|
| Metacritic | 54/100 |
Review scores
| Source | Rating |
| AllMusic | 3/5 stars |
| Entertainment Weekly | (B−) |
| The Guardian | 2/5 stars |
| The Independent | 2/5 stars |
| Los Angeles Times | 2/4 stars |
| MSN | 8/10 stars |
| Slant Magazine | 1.5/5 stars |
| The Times | 2/5 stars |

I Dreamed a Dream sold approximately 130,000 copies in the United Kingdom on its first day of release alone, and approximately 400,000 copies by the end of the week. Sales of 411,820 copies made it the largest first week sales of any debut album in UK chart history. The album debuted at No. 1 in Australia, selling 164,973 in the first week of release and has been certified 9× Platinum (630,000 units shipped). In New Zealand, the album was certified 3× Platinum for shipping over 45,000 copies after just one week of release while debuting at number 1; the album was certified 8× Platinum (120,000 units shipped) three weeks after its release. The Japanese market regarded it as a classical music album, and it debuted at No. 5 on the Oricon weekly comprehensive charts with around 36,000 copies, and climbed to No. 3 the next week.

In the United States, the album debuted at number one on the Billboard 200 with approximate sales of 701,000 units, becoming the best sales week for an album in the United States for 2009. I Dreamed a Dream broke the record for the highest debut by a new solo female artist in the SoundScan era (post 1991), and Boyle became the oldest artist to reach number-one with a debut album, at 49 years old. It also became the biggest opening sales week of 2009 in the U.S., beating out Eminem's Relapse which sold 608,000. It stayed at number one for five consecutive weeks, selling in excess of half a million copies each week, bringing her total U.S. sales over to 2.9 million copies. It is the fastest-selling debut album to reach two million in sales and was 2009's second biggest-selling album. In just 6 weeks it sold 3.1 million sold according to SoundScan; behind Taylor Swift's Fearless which sold 3.21 million since being released one year prior on 11 November 2008. The album moved 3,974,000 copies in the United States to date. The album sold over 3.5 million copies worldwide in its first three weeks of release, and by January 2011 sold 14 million. It received a Grammy Award nomination for Best Pop Vocal Album but lost to Lady Gaga's The Fame Monster.

== Promotion ==
To promote the release, Boyle sang on several television shows. Her first performance was on the America's Got Talent final, on 16 September, where she performed "Wild Horses" before more than 13 million viewers in the United States. On 10 November, she sang "I Dreamed a Dream" on Dancing with the Stars, during the performance of Chelsie Hightower and Tony Dovolani, and she also sang "Wild Horses" on The X Factor. On 23 November, Boyle gave a live TV performance on the Today Show on the NBC television network which took place outside its studios on Rockefeller Plaza; Boyle sang "I Dreamed a Dream", "Wild Horses", and "Cry Me a River". After the show, Boyle attended a lunch with fans where she was presented with a handmade quilt made by over one hundred people from 28 countries including Mexico, Poland, Japan and Antarctica. On 13 December 2009 she appeared in her own television special, "I Dreamed a Dream: the Susan Boyle Story", featuring a duet with her idol Elaine Paige. The show achieved ratings of 10 million viewers in the United Kingdom. In the U.S. it was carried on the TV Guide Network, becoming the highest rated special in the tiny cable network's history. It was reported that Susan Boyle would be invited to perform "I Dreamed a Dream" for a small gathering at the birthday celebration of Michelle Obama on 17 January 2010. "You'll See" was included in the international soundtrack to Ti Ti Ti, a Brazilian telenovela, which helping to propel "I Dreamed A Dream" up the charts in Brazil.

== Track listing ==
Standard edition
| No. | Title | Writer(s) | Original artist | Length |
|---|---|---|---|---|
| 1. | "Wild Horses" | Mick Jagger; Keith Richards | The Rolling Stones | 4:53 |
| 2. | "I Dreamed a Dream" | Alain Boublil; Herbert Kretzmer; Claude-Michel Schönberg | Patti LuPone, from Les Misérables | 3:12 |
| 3. | "Cry Me a River" | Arthur Hamilton | Julie London | 2:41 |
| 4. | "How Great Thou Art" | Carl Boberg | Carl Boberg | 3:12 |
| 5. | "You'll See" | Madonna; David Foster | Madonna | 4:41 |
| 6. | "Daydream Believer" | John Stewart | The Monkees | 3:18 |
| 7. | "Up to the Mountain" | Patty Griffin | Patty Griffin | 3:29 |
| 8. | "Amazing Grace" | John Newton | John Newton | 3:33 |
| 9. | "Who I Was Born to Be" | Johan Fransson; Tim Larsson; Tobias Lundgren; Audra Mae | Susan Boyle | 4:08 |
| 10. | "Proud" | Wayne Hector; Andy Hill; Steve Mac | The cast of Britannia High | 3:20 |
| 11. | "The End of the World" | Sylvia Dee; Arthur Kent | Skeeter Davis | 3:13 |
| 12. | "Silent Night" | Franz Xaver Gruber; Josef Mohr | Franz Xaver Gruber | 2:59 |

Japanese edition bonus track
| No. | Title | Writer(s) | Original artist | Length |
|---|---|---|---|---|
| 13. | "Wings to Fly" | Kunihiko Murai | Akai Tori | 3:51 |

Tesco Bonus DVD
| No. | Title | Length |
|---|---|---|
| 1. | "The Susan Boyle Story: Interview" | 11:19 |
| 2. | "I Dreamed a Dream" (original audition) | 3:11 |

== Personnel ==
Production and recording

- Produced and Arranged by Steve Mac.
- Engineered by Chris Laws & Dann Pursey.
- Pro Tools: Chris Laws.
- Mixed by Ren Swan.
- Recorded and Mixed at Rokstone Studios, London.
- String Arrangements by Dave Arch.
- Strings Recorded at Air Studios, London by Geoff Foster, Chris Barrett & Steve Orchard.
- Assisted by Nick Carvonaro and Fiona Cruickshank.
- String Leader: Rolf Wilson.
- Strings contracted by: Isobel Griffiths.
- Copyist: John Baker.
- Choir: LJ Singers led by Lawrence Johnson. Choir Recorded at Sphere Studios & Rokstone Studios.
- Sphere session assisted by Ronan Phelan.
- Album Coordinator for Steve Mac: Nicki L’Amy.

Instruments and vocals

- Piano: Dave Arch & Steve Mac.
- Hammond Organ: Dave Arch.
- Vibes on 'Cry Me A River': Franc Ricotti.
- Drums: Chris Laws except 'Cry Me A River': Ralph Salmins
- Guitars: John Parricelli.
- Bass on 'Who I Was Born To Be': Steve Pearce.
- All Keyboard and Synths: Steve Mac.
- Background Vocals: Mae McKenna.

== Charts ==
=== Weekly charts ===
| Chart (2009–2010) | Peak position |
|---|---|
| Argentinian Albums Chart | 1 |
| Australian Albums (ARIA) | 1 |
| Austrian Albums (Ö3 Austria) | 7 |
| Belgian Albums (Ultratop Flanders) | 1 |
| Belgian Albums (Ultratop Wallonia) | 5 |
| Canadian Albums (Billboard) | 1 |
| Danish Albums (Hitlisten) | 2 |
| Dutch Albums (Album Top 100) | 1 |
| Estonian Albums Chart | 4 |
| Finnish Albums (Suomen virallinen lista) | 10 |
| French Albums (SNEP) | 8 |
| German Albums (Offizielle Top 100) | 3 |
| Greek Albums (IFPI) | 1 |
| Hungarian Albums (MAHASZ) | 4 |
| Irish Albums (IRMA) | 1 |
| Italian Albums (FIMI) | 21 |
| Japanese Albums (Oricon) | 3 |
| Mexican Albums (AMPROFON) | 5 |
| New Zealand Albums (RMNZ) | 1 |
| Norwegian Albums (VG-lista) | 5 |
| Polish Albums Chart | 23 |
| Portuguese Albums (AFP) | 16 |
| Scottish Albums (Official Charts) | 1 |
| South African Albums Chart | 1 |
| Spanish Albums (Promusicae) | 10 |
| Swedish Albums (Sverigetopplistan) | 2 |
| Swiss Albums (Schweizer Hitparade) | 1 |
| UK Albums (Official Charts) | 1 |
| US Billboard 200 | 1 |

=== Year-end charts ===
| Chart (2009) | Position |
|---|---|
| Australian Albums (ARIA) | 1 |
| Belgian Albums (Ultratop Flanders) | 93 |
| Dutch Albums (Album Top 100) | 33 |
| French Albums (SNEP) | 53 |
| New Zealand Albums (RMNZ) | 1 |
| Swedish Albums (Sverigetopplistan) | 37 |
| Swiss Albums (Schweizer Hitparade) | 84 |
| UK Albums (OCC) | 1 |

| Chart (2010) | Position |
|---|---|
| Australian Albums (ARIA) | 2 |
| Austrian Albums (Ö3 Austria) | 45 |
| Canadian Albums (Billboard) | 2 |
| Dutch Albums (Album Top 100) | 9 |
| European Top 100 Albums | 11 |
| French Albums (SNEP) | 191 |
| Japanese albums (Oricon) | 51 |
| Mexican Albums (AMPROFON) | 59 |
| New Zealand Albums (RMNZ) | 2 |
| Swedish Albums (Sverigetopplistan) | 15 |
| Swiss Albums (Schweizer Hitparade) | 22 |
| UK Albums (OCC) | 52 |
| US Billboard 200 | 1 |

=== Decade-end charts ===
| Chart (2000–2009) | Position |
|---|---|
| Australian Albums (ARIA) | 18 |
| Chart (2010–2019) | Position |
| Australian Albums (ARIA) | 25 |
| US Billboard 200 | 85 |

=== All-time charts ===
| Chart | Position |
|---|---|
| Irish Female Albums (IRMA) | 12 |

== Certifications ==
| Region | Certification | Certified units/sales |
|---|---|---|
| Australia (ARIA) | 10× Platinum | 750,000 |
| Austria (IFPI Austria) | Gold | 10,000^{*} |
| Belgium (BRMA) | Platinum | 30,000^{*} |
| Canada (Music Canada) | 5× Platinum | 400,000^{^} |
| Denmark (IFPI Danmark) | Gold | 15,000^{^} |
| France (SNEP) | Platinum | 100,000^{*} |
| GCC (IFPI Middle East) | Platinum | 6,000^{*} |
| Germany (BVMI) | Gold | 100,000^{‡} |
| Greece (IFPI Greece) | Gold | 3,000^{^} |
| Hungary (MAHASZ) | Gold | 3,000^{^} |
| Ireland (IRMA) | 8× Platinum | 120,000^{^} |
| Italy (FIMI) | Gold | 30,000^{*} |
| Japan (RIAJ) | Platinum | 250,000^{^} |
| Mexico (AMPROFON) | Gold | 40,000 |
| Netherlands (NVPI) | Platinum | 50,000^{^} |
| New Zealand (RMNZ) | 11× Platinum | 165,000^{^} |
| Poland (ZPAV) | Gold | 10,000^{*} |
| Spain (Promusicae) | Gold | 30,000^{^} |
| Sweden (GLF) | Platinum | 40,000^{‡} |
| Switzerland (IFPI Switzerland) | Platinum | 30,000^{^} |
| Taiwan | — | 20,000 (Note: 2009 year-end sales, according to Taiwan Institute of Economic Research.) |
| United Kingdom (BPI) | 7× Platinum | 2,100,000^{^} |
| United States (RIAA) | 4× Platinum | 4,000,000^{^} |
Summaries
| Europe (IFPI) | 3× Platinum | 3,000,000^{*} |
^{*} Sales figures based on certification alone.^{^} Shipments figures based on certification alone.^{‡} Sales+streaming figures based on certification alone.
