= Standing Ovation: The Greatest Songs from the Stage =

Studio album by Susan Boyle
- Released: 13 November 2012
- Recorded: 2011–2012
- Length: 43:37
- Label: Syco; Columbia
- Producer: Richard "Biff" Stannard; Ash Howes

Susan Boyle chronology
Someone to Watch Over Me (2011)	Standing Ovation: The Greatest Songs from the Stage (2012)	Home for Christmas (2013)

Professional ratings
Review scores
Source	Rating
AllMusic	3/5 stars
Express Music News	4/5 stars

Standing Ovation: The Greatest Songs from the Stage is the fourth studio album by Scottish singer Susan Boyle. It was released on 13 November 2012. The album features renditions of songs from prominent musical theatre shows and films. It also includes duets with American singer Donny Osmond and The Phantom of the Opera star Michael Crawford.

Examples of the musical works involved include Jekyll & Hyde and Fame. The album experienced commercial success in both the United Kingdom and the United States, hitting the #12 slot in the Billboard 200 chart.

== Track listing ==
No.	Title	Writer(s)	Length
1.	"Over the Rainbow"	Harold Arlen, E.Y. Harburg	5:41
2.	"The Winner Takes It All"	Benny Andersson, Björn Ulvaeus	4:49
3.	"Send in the Clowns"	Stephen Sondheim	3:44
4.	"The Music of the Night" (featuring Michael Crawford)	Andrew Lloyd Webber, Charles Hart	5:12
5.	"Bring Him Home"	Claude-Michel Schönberg, Alain Boublil, Herbert Kretzmer	3:30
6.	"Memory"	Andrew Lloyd Webber, Trevor Nunn	4:06
7.	"As Long as He Needs Me"	Lionel Bart	2:49
8.	"All I Ask of You" (featuring Donny Osmond)	Andrew Lloyd Webber, Charles Hart	3:43
9.	"Out Here on My Own"	Michael Gore, Lesley Gore	3:12
10.	"You'll Never Walk Alone"	Richard Rodgers, Oscar Hammerstein II	3:24
11.	"This Is the Moment" (featuring Donny Osmond)	Frank Wildhorn, Leslie Bricusse	3:27

== Charts ==
=== Weekly charts ===
Chart (2012)	Peak position
Australian Albums (ARIA)	6
Belgian Albums (Ultratop Flanders)	18
Belgian Albums (Ultratop Wallonia)	58
Canadian Albums (Billboard)	17
Dutch Albums (Album Top 100)	11
Irish Albums (IRMA)	19
New Zealand Albums (RMNZ)	1
Scottish Albums (OCC)	1
South African Albums (RSG)	18
Swedish Albums (Sverigetopplistan)	3
UK Albums (OCC)	7
US Billboard 200	12

=== Year-end charts ===
Chart (2012)	Position
Australian Albums (ARIA)	36
Dutch Albums (Album Top 100)	88
UK Albums (OCC)	69
Chart (2013)	Position
US Billboard 200	132

=== Certifications ===
Region	Certification	Sales/Shipment
Australia (ARIA)	Platinum	70,000^
New Zealand (RIANZ)	Platinum	15,000^
United Kingdom (BPI)	Gold	100,000^
^shipments figures based on certification alone

== Release history ==
Region	Date	Format	Label
United States	13 November 2012	CD, digital download	Columbia
United Kingdom	19 November 2012	CD, digital download	Syco, Columbia
