= The Gift (Susan Boyle album) =

Studio album by Susan Boyle
- Released: 8 November 2010
- Recorded: July–September 2010; London, England
- Genre: Operatic pop; crossover; adult contemporary; easy listening; Christmas
- Length: 35:13
- Label: Syco; Columbia
- Producer: Steve Mac

Susan Boyle chronology
I Dreamed a Dream (2009)	The Gift (2010)	Someone to Watch Over Me (2011)

Singles from The Gift
- 1. "Perfect Day" Released: 8 November 2010

The Gift is the second album and first Christmas album by Scottish singer Susan Boyle, which was released on 8 November 2010. Boyle hinted that the album has a 1960s feel "because that was [her] era". Despite having a mixed critical reception, the album debuted at number one on both the British and American album charts and received a nomination at the 54th Grammy Awards for Best Traditional Pop Vocal Album.

== Background ==
It was produced by Steve Mac, who says, "Now Susan’s used to the studio and the recording process, this time round we might go even further down a traditional route of recording by getting a band together and rehearsing songs before we go into the studio to see what works, how she reacts with certain parts, and so we can change the arrangements that way. I think that’s going to work much better... With Susan it's very important she connects with the public and the public connect with her. She doesn’t want to sing anything that hasn’t happened to her or she can't relate to."

In a lead up to the release, Boyle offered her fans a chance to duet with her, with a competition titled Susan's Search. Applicants had to record a video of themselves singing "Silent Night" and upload it to her YouTube channel. The winner was 33-year-old paramedic Amber Stassi of Brewerton, New York.

== Reception ==
Professional ratings
Aggregate scores
Source	Rating
Metacritic	62/100
Review scores
Source	Rating
Allmusic	2.5/5 stars
BBC Music	(favourable)
Metro International	(mixed)
Yahoo! Music	6/10 stars

The album has received generally lukewarm reviews from critics. Stephen Thomas Erlewine of Allmusic gave the album two and a half out of five stars, complimenting Boyle as the right person to make a holiday album, but referred to the music as "predictable". Graham Rockingham of Metro International gave the album mixed reviews, criticising how the album can be a number 1 charter, but at the same time be well suited for traditional carols.

In the United Kingdom, The Gift debuted at No. 1. However, it remained at the top spot for only one week and dropped out of the chart altogether after eleven weeks. In comparison, Boyle's first album topped the UK chart for four weeks and remained on the chart for 39 weeks.

In the United States, The Gift debuted at the top of the Billboard 200 chart with first week sales of 318,000 copies. In its second week, the album stayed at No. 1, and sold even more copies: 335,000. In its third week, it dropped to No. 3 on the Billboard 200, selling 263,000 copies. In its fourth week, The Gift returned to No. 1, selling 272,000 additional copies. The album remained at No. 1 in its fifth week with sales of 243,000 copies. By the end of 2010, sales of The Gift totalled 1,852,000 copies in the United States, and was the fifth best-selling album for the year. As of November 2014, the album has attained cumulative sales of 2,180,000 copies in the United States according to SoundScan.

The album debuted at No. 3 on the Canadian Albums Chart, selling 13,000 copies in its first week.

== Track listing ==
No.	Title	Writer(s)	Original artist	Length
1.	"Perfect Day"	Lou Reed	Lou Reed	4:31
2.	"Hallelujah"	Leonard Cohen	Leonard Cohen	3:53
3.	"Do You Hear What I Hear?" (featuring Amber Stassi)	Noël Regney, Gloria Shayne Baker	Harry Simeone Chorale	3:55
4.	"Don't Dream It's Over"	Neil Finn	Crowded House	3:47
5.	"The First Noel"	Trad/Arranger Steve Mac, David Arch	Christmas carol	2:59
6.	"O Holy Night"	Adolphe Adam, John Sullivan Dwight / Arranger Steve Mac, David Arch	Christmas carol	4:05
7.	"Away in a Manger"	Trad/Arranger Steve Mac, David Arch	Christmas carol	2:56
8.	"Make Me a Channel of Your Peace"	Trad/Arranger Sebastian Temple	Christian hymn	4:24
9.	"Auld Lang Syne"	Robert Burns, Trad/Arranger Steve Mac, David Arch	Folk song	2:45
10.	"O Come All Ye Faithful"	Trad/Arranger Steve Mac, David Arch	Christian hymn	2:06
11.	"Vapor Trail" (Japanese bonus track)	Yumi Arai	Yumi Arai	3:46

== Release history ==
Country	Release date	Format(s)
United Kingdom	8 November 2010	CD, digital download
Canada	9 November 2010	CD, digital download
United States	9 November 2010	CD, digital download
Japan	10 November 2010	CD, digital download
Argentina	10 November 2010	CD, digital download

== Charts ==
=== Weekly charts ===
Chart (2010)	Peak position
Australian Albums (ARIA)	2
Austrian Albums (Ö3 Austria)	38
Belgian Albums (Ultratop Flanders)	2
Belgian Albums (Ultratop Wallonia)	30
Canadian Albums (Billboard)	1
Danish Albums (Hitlisten)	14
Dutch Albums (Album Top 100)	1
European Top 100 Albums	5
Finnish Albums (Suomen virallinen lista)	20
French Albums (SNEP)	29
Greek Albums (IFPI)	7
Hungarian Albums (MAHASZ)	7
Irish Albums (IRMA)	4
Italian Albums (FIMI)	97
Japanese Albums (Oricon)	18
Mexican Albums (AMPROFON)	71
New Zealand Albums (RMNZ)	1
Norwegian Albums (VG-lista)	6
Scottish Albums (OCC)	1
Spanish Albums (PROMUSICAE)	95
Swedish Albums (Sverigetopplistan)	10
Swiss Albums (Schweizer Hitparade)	19
UK Albums (OCC)	1
US Billboard 200	1
US Top Holiday Albums (Billboard)	1

=== Year-end charts ===
Chart (2010)	Position
Australian Albums (ARIA)	5
Belgian Albums (Ultratop Flanders)	35
Dutch Albums (Album Top 100)	52
French Albums (SNEP)	197
New Zealand Albums (RMNZ)	1
Swedish Albums (Sverigetopplistan)	36
UK Albums (OCC)	13
US Billboard 200	100

Chart (2011)	Position
Belgian Albums (Ultratop Flanders)	30
Canadian Albums (Billboard)	11
New Zealand Albums (RMNZ)	42
US Billboard 200	5

Chart (2012)	Position
US Billboard 200	169

=== Decade-end charts ===
Chart (2010–2019)	Position
Australian Albums (ARIA)	40
US Billboard 200	161

== Certifications ==
Region	Certification	Certified units/sales
Australia (ARIA)	3× Platinum	210,000^{^}
Belgium (BRMA)	Platinum	30,000^{*}
Canada (Music Canada)	2× Platinum	160,000^{^}
Hungary (MAHASZ)	Gold	3,000^{^}
Ireland (IRMA)	2× Platinum	30,000^{^}
New Zealand (RMNZ)	4× Platinum	60,000^{^}
Sweden (GLF)	Gold	20,000^{‡}
United Kingdom (BPI)	2× Platinum	600,000^{^}
United States (RIAA)	3× Platinum	2,180,000
^{*} Sales figures based on certification alone.^{^} Shipments figures based on certification alone.^{‡} Sales+streaming figures based on certification alone.
