= Wild Horses (Rolling Stones song) =

1971 single by the Rolling Stones

- Japanese single picture sleeve

Single by the Rolling Stones

from the album Sticky Fingers
- B-side: "Sway"
- Released: 12 June 1971 (US)
- Recorded: December 1969 – February 1970
- Studio: Muscle Shoals Sound, Sheffield, Alabama; Olympic, London
- Genre: Rock; country rock; country
- Length: 5:38
- Label: Rolling Stones (RS-19101)
- Songwriter: Jagger–Richards
- Producer: Jimmy Miller

Rolling Stones US singles chronology
| "Brown Sugar" (1971) | "Wild Horses" (1971) | "Tumbling Dice" (1972) |

"Wild Horses" is a song by the English rock band the Rolling Stones from their 1971 album Sticky Fingers. It was also released on 12 June 1971 as a single, with "Sway" as its B-side. However, The Flying Burrito Brothers were the first to release the song nearly a year earlier in April 1970, with a cover appearing on their second album.

Rolling Stone ranked the song number 334 in its "500 Greatest Songs of All Time" list in 2004 and number 193 in its 2021 update.

== Recording ==
"Wild Horses" was recorded from 2–4 December 1969 at Muscle Shoals Sound Studio in Alabama while Albert and David Maysles were shooting Gimme Shelter. The song was not released for over a year due to legal wrangling with the band's former label ABKCO Records and Allen Klein. "Wild Horses" and "Brown Sugar" are the only two songs on Sticky Fingers (1971) where the Stones co-own the rights with ABKCO Records.

Earlier that year, Marianne Faithfull overdosed on sleeping pills. When she woke up, she told Mick Jagger, "Wild horses wouldn't drag me away". Mick recalled, "Everyone always says this was written about Marianne, but I don't think it was; that was all well over by then. But I was definitely very inside this piece emotionally." Keith Richards said, "If there is a classic way of Mick and me working together this is it. I had the riff and chorus line, Mick got stuck into the verses. Just like 'Satisfaction', 'Wild Horses' was about the usual thing of not wanting to be on the road, being a million miles from where you want to be."

The music originated as a lullaby Richards was writing for his newborn son. The style emerged from Richards' experiments with open tuning a twelve-string guitar. He wrote, "There's a certain forlornness that can come out of a twelve-string. I started off, I think, on a regular six-string open E, and it sounded very nice, but sometimes you just get these ideas. What if I open tuned a twelve-string? All it meant was translate what Mississippi Fred McDowell was doing—twelve-string slide-into five-string mode, which meant a ten-string guitar."

Richards performs on both electric and 12-string acoustic guitar. Mick Taylor plays a Nashville tuned acoustic guitar, in which the EADG strings of the acoustic guitar are strung an octave higher than in standard tuning. Ian Stewart refused to perform the tack piano part on the track due to the prevalence of minor chords, which he dismissed as "Chinese". Jim Dickinson played the piano instead.

== Personnel ==
=== The Rolling Stones ===
- Mick Jagger – vocals
- Keith Richards – twelve string acoustic guitar, electric guitar, backing vocals
- Mick Taylor – Nashville tuned acoustic guitar
- Bill Wyman – bass guitar
- Charlie Watts – drums

=== Additional personnel ===
- Jim Dickinson – tack piano

== Release and legacy ==
"Wild Horses" was released as the album's second US-only single in June 1971. It reached number 28 on the Billboard Hot 100 chart.

Record World predicted, "[this] beautiful stylistic shift of gears will go directly to top". Billboard called it, "a potent followup to their 'Brown Sugar' smash in this change-of-pace rock ballad material."

In 1995, The Rolling Stones recorded an acoustic version of "Wild Horses" for Stripped. A black and white music video of the song was produced to promote the album.

An instrumental version of the song is featured during the end credits of Martin Scorsese's Rolling Stones documentary film Shine a Light (2008).

An early, acoustic take of "Wild Horses" was released on the Deluxe and Super Deluxe versions of the reissued Sticky Fingers album on 8 June 2015.

The song appears on a handful of the Rolling Stones' concert DVDs: Bridges to Babylon Tour '97–98 (1998), Rolling Stones - Four Flicks (2003), and The Biggest Bang (2007).

Jagger's ex-wife Jerry Hall named "Wild Horses" her favourite Rolling Stones song.

"Wild Horses" figures prominently in the films Adaptation (2002) and Camp (2003). Alyson Michalka sang the song in episode "Fancy Dan" (S1: E16) of Hellcats in 2011. The song was played during Li'l Sebastian's memorial service on Parks and Recreation (S3: E16). It also appeared during the Season 1 finale of BoJack Horseman and in Episode 11, Season 5 of Billions.

== Charts ==
| Chart (1971) | Peak position |
|---|---|
| Canada Top Singles (RPM) | 11 |
| US Billboard Hot 100 | 28 |

| Chart (1996) | Peak position |
|---|---|
| Canada Top Singles (RPM) | 59 |
| Netherlands (Dutch Top 40 Tipparade) | 4 |
| Netherlands (Dutch Single Tip) | 2 |
| Sweden (Sverigetopplistan) | 53 |

| Chart (2019) | Peak position |
|---|---|
| US Lyric Find (Billboard) | 1 |

== Certifications ==
Certifications for "Wild Horses" by The Rolling Stones
| Region | Certification | Certified units/sales |
|---|---|---|
| Australia (ARIA) | Platinum | 70,000^{‡} |
| New Zealand (RMNZ) | 3× Platinum | 90,000^{‡} |
| United Kingdom (BPI) | Gold | 400,000^{‡} |
^{‡} Sales+streaming figures based on certification alone.

== Other versions ==
Gram Parsons heard a demo of the song after the Altamont disaster and asked if The Flying Burrito Brothers could cover it. The Rolling Stones couriered a temporary mix to the band and made them promise not to release their cover as a single. Gram wrote out the lyrics three times in his journal. One copy includes the chords. The band's cover version was included on their 1970 album Burrito Deluxe, released almost a year before the Rolling Stones' original appeared on Sticky Fingers.

The song has been covered extensively, including versions by Leon Russell, Elvis Costello, Neil Young, Labelle, Sheryl Crow, Natasha Bedingfield, Guns N'Roses, Bush, and Garbage. The band Old & In the Way did a bluegrass version on their debut album.

=== The Sundays' version ===
The Sundays recorded the song in 1992. It was released as the B-side to the UK single version of "Goodbye" on Parlophone and on the American release of their second album, Blind. It was later released as a promotional single on DGC Records in the United States.

This version of the song was memorably used in the thriller Fear with Reese Witherspoon and Mark Wahlberg during a scene in which Wahlberg's character is with Witherspoon's character on a roller coaster. It was also used in the Buffy the Vampire Slayer episode "The Prom", in which Buffy dances with Angel.

=== Susan Boyle version ===
"Wild Horses"

Single by Susan Boyle

from the album I Dreamed a Dream
- Released: November 2009
- Recorded: 2009
- Length: 3:16
- Label: Syco Music, Columbia, Sony Music
- Songwriter: Jagger/Richards
- Producer: Steve Mac

Susan Boyle singles chronology
| "Wild Horses" (2009) | "I Dreamed a Dream" (2009) |

In 2009, Scottish singer Susan Boyle released a cover version of "Wild Horses" as the lead single from her debut studio album I Dreamed a Dream which would go onto become the best selling album in the United Kingdom of 2009, and one of the best selling albums internationally in 2009. Boyle performed "Wild Horses" on America's Got Talent in 2009, subsequently seeing her version peak at number ninety-eight on the US Billboard Hot 100 Singles charts. In her native Scotland, it debuted at number eight on the Scottish Singles Charts, and in the United Kingdom, it peaked at number nine.

==== Background ====
Following her performance of "Wild Horses" on America's Got Talent in 2009, NBC remarked that Boyle's version was "a personal story about how achieving such massive success extremely quickly has affected her life". Boyle claimed that her decision to record a version of "Wild Horses" was about her paying homage to the fact she was a "spectator looking out at the world" prior to her achieving fame, acknowledging that following her success she was now "part of that world", claiming that although it was daunting for her she was "ready to embrace it because I feel a bit more confident in myself now", further adding she was "more able to cope and more able to take part in the dream", a reference to her stay in rehab following her time on Britain's Got Talent.

Her American's Got Talent performance of the song was noted for her " soft, vulnerable tone" before her voice escalating during the songs chorus which exhilarated the audience. The performance was praised for Boyle's ability to "put her own unique spin on the melody" accompanied by "some gorgeous strings".

==== Reception ====
Mick Jagger felt Boyle's "ghostly version" was "much better than anything I had ever done". The Guardian claimed that her version of the song was "remarkable" and claimed that Boyle could "can sing 10 times better than Mick Jagger". Irish Central claimed that the version was "an outstanding song, showing Boyle's voice at its best. She soars on the high notes with slow, majestic delivery and wonderful timing. It is so outstanding a version that the Rolling Stones are re-releasing theirs".

==== Chart performance ====
| Chart (2009) | Peak position |
|---|---|
| Australia (ARIA) | 93 |
| Canada Hot 100 (Billboard) | 95 |
| Ireland (IRMA) | 11 |
| UK Singles (Official Charts) | 9 |
| US Billboard Hot 100 | 98 |
| Scotland (The Official Charts Company) | 8 |

==== Certifications ====
| Region | Certification | Certified units/sales |
|---|---|---|
| United Kingdom (BPI) | Silver | 200,000^{‡} |
^{‡} Sales+streaming figures based on certification alone.

=== Elisapie Isaac version ===
In 2023, Canadian Inuk musician Elisapie translated the song into her indigenous Inuktitut and recorded a version called "Qimmijuat".
