= I Dreamed a Dream =

Song from the 1980 musical Les Misérables

Song by Rose Laurens

from the album from Les Misérables
- Language: French; English
- Published: 1980
- Recorded: 1980 (French cast); 1985 (London cast); 1987 (Broadway cast)
- Genre: Musical; theatrical; pop
- Composer: Claude-Michel Schönberg
- Lyricists: Alain Boublil (French); Herbert Kretzmer (English)

"I Dreamed a Dream" is a song from the 1980 musical Les Misérables. It is a solo that is sung by Fantine during the first act. The music is by Claude-Michel Schönberg, with orchestrations by John Cameron. The English lyrics are by Herbert Kretzmer, based on the original French libretto by Alain Boublil and Jean-Marc Natel from the original French production.

The song is a lament, sung by the anguished Fantine, who has just been fired from her job at the factory and thrown onto the streets. She thinks back to happier days before being abandoned by the father of her daughter Cosette, and wonders at all that has gone wrong in her life. The song is typically played in the key of E-flat major with the final chorus in F major. The song has also become a jazz standard.

In the 1985 musical, the song occurs after Fantine has been fired, and before "Lovely Ladies". In the original French production and the 2012 film adaptation, these two musical numbers are swapped around, to place dramatic emphasis on Fantine's depressing descent into prostitution.

The original French song was extensively rewritten for the English production by Herbert Kretzmer, cutting the last few lines which became the ending to "Lovely Ladies" ('Don't they know they're making love to one already dead?'). For the French revival in 1991, the song was loosely translated back from the English version; thus there are two very different French versions of the song.

== History ==
The song, as it appeared in the original Paris production from 1980, was titled J'avais rêvé d'une autre vie ("I had dreamed of another life"), and was originally sung by Rose Laurens. The first English-language production of Les Misérables opened on the West End in London in October 1985, with the role of Fantine portrayed by Patti LuPone. She later featured the song on her 1993 album Patti LuPone Live!

When the musical made its Broadway début in New York City in March 1987, Fantine was played by Randy Graff. Laurie Beechman performed the role in the original U.S. touring production in 1988 and then on Broadway in 1990. That year she included the song on her album Listen to My Heart. Debra Byrne sang the song on the Complete Symphonic Recording. Ruthie Henshall sang it on the Tenth Anniversary Concert Recording (1995). A Broadway revival in 2006 featured Daphne Rubin-Vega (2006–07), Lea Salonga (2007), and Judy Kuhn (2007–08). Lea Salonga sang it for the 25th Anniversary Concert in London (2010).

The show, and the song, have been translated into 21 languages, including Japanese, Hebrew, Icelandic, Norwegian, Czech, Polish, Spanish, and Estonian, and there have been 31 cast recordings featuring the song. The London cast version is Triple Platinum in the UK, for sales of more than 900,000, and Platinum in the U.S., for sales of more than one million. The Broadway cast version is Quadruple Platinum in the U.S. (more than four million sold), where four other versions have also gone Gold.

== Cover versions ==
Many popular singers have recorded cover versions of "I Dreamed a Dream". Neil Diamond recorded the song for his 1987 live album Hot August Night II and released the song as a single. It peaked at no. 13 on the U.S. Billboard Adult Contemporary chart in November 1987 and at no. 90 on the UK Singles Chart. Diamond's version features a lyrical alteration at the end of the song; instead of "Now life has killed the dream I dreamed" Diamond sings, "But life can't kill the dream I dreamed".

Other male singers who have recorded the song include rock singer David Essex on his 1987 album Centre Stage, Phantom of the Opera star Michael Crawford on his 1989 album With Love / The Phantom Unmasked, LuPone's Evita co-star Mandy Patinkin on his 1994 album Experiment and British theater star Michael Ball (Marius in the Original London production of Les Mis) on his 1996 album The Musicals.

In 1991, Aretha Franklin included a version of the song on her album What You See is What You Sweat. Although not released as a single, Franklin has performed the song at various venues, including the 1993 inaugural celebration for U.S. President Bill Clinton.

Other female singers who have recorded versions of the song include English singer and stage actress Elaine Paige, from a 1993 performance at Birmingham Symphony Hall which was included on her 1995 album, Encore, original Annie title cast member Andrea McArdle in the 1996 recording On Broadway, New Zealand singer Hayley Westenra and British pop star Petula Clark, each in 2001, Canadian singer-songwriter Allison Crowe in 2005, and Broadway actress Susan Egan in 2008. British actress and singer Marti Webb performed the song on her album Performance (1989). In 2008, Italian rock noir band Belladonna covered the song in their London show. In 2010, opera singer Rose Jang covered the song for her digital album Songs of Hope by Mnet Media.

The song was covered on the Glee episode "Dream On" by Shelby Corcoran and Rachel Berry, portrayed by Idina Menzel and Lea Michele respectively, akin to a dream sequence where they duet together, while in real time Rachel was listening to a tape of Shelby, her birth mother singing the song.

Tom Ellis and Dennis Haysbert dueted the song as Lucifer and God on the Lucifer episode "Bloody Celestial Karaoke Jukebox" in season 5.

Josh Groban and Michael Ball sang a duet at the end of Never Mind the Buzzcocks (Broadcast 21 December 2010).

Joe McElderry recorded the song for his second album, Classic.

Katherine Jenkins released a French cover of the song entitled "J'avais rêvé d'une autre vie/I dreamed of another life" in her 8th studio album Daydream.

Kika Edgar recorded a Spanish cover titled "Un sueño que alguna vez soñé/A dream I once dreamed" for her album Broadway.

In October 2011, Celtic Woman performed "I Dreamed a Dream" as part of their 2011 "Believe" tour, recorded by PBS at the Fox Theatre in Atlanta. The song was one of two songs sung as "A Tribute to Broadway", the other song being "Circle of Life" from the Disney movie The Lion King. The song, which was only released on DVD and as part of the television special, was sung by Lisa Kelly and Chloë Agnew.

As part of a compilation, and the title track to the Australian album, Lucy Maunder sang the song for ABC Classics I Dreamed a Dream: The Hit Songs of Broadway.

As part of the Chinese theatrics singing competition Super-Vocal aired by China HunanTV, two male competitors, Li Qi and Gao Tianhe, covered this song.

== Susan Boyle version ==
"I Dreamed a Dream"

Single by Susan Boyle

from the album I Dreamed a Dream
- Released: 15 April 2010
- Recorded: 2009
- Genre: Operatic pop
- Length: 3:11
- Label: Syco, Columbia
- Songwriters: Claude-Michel Schönberg (music); Herbert Kretzmer (lyrics)
- Producer: Steve Mac

Susan Boyle singles chronology
"Wild Horses" (2009)	"I Dreamed a Dream" (2010)	"Perfect Day" (2010)

The song had a resurgence in popularity in 2009 when Scottish singer Susan Boyle performed it as her audition for the third series of the British reality television programme Britain's Got Talent. Boyle's performance elicited a unanimous vote for passage into the next round of competition by judges Piers Morgan, Amanda Holden and Simon Cowell, with Morgan giving Boyle "the biggest yes [he had] ever given" in his three years of judging the show. Elaine Paige, Boyle's role model, later expressed interest in singing a duet with her. The programme received high ratings and Boyle's performance was quickly added to sites such as YouTube, where millions of people viewed it in the first month alone. Boyle sang the song again during the finals of Britain's Got Talent on 30 May 2009, where she placed second in the competition behind British dance troupe Diversity. The song catapulted her to super-stardom, and it helped sales of her album I Dreamed a Dream. The album has been declared the fastest selling debut album of all time in the UK, and sold 701,000 copies in its first week in the US, breaking the record for highest debut ever for a solo female artist.

Shortly after Boyle's audition aired on ITV in April, the Original London Cast Recording of LuPone singing "I Dreamed a Dream" was downloaded so often that the song entered music charts in the U.S. and UK. The U.S. Billboard magazine's Hot Digital Songs and Hot Singles Recurrents charts for the week of 2 May 2009 had LuPone's 1985 recording at no. 61 and no. 20, respectively. LuPone's version also reached no. 45 on the UK Singles Chart on the week of 25 April 2009. Boyle's later 2009 recording rivalled pre-order sales records on Amazon.com in November 2009.

=== Chart performance ===
"I Dreamed a Dream" entered the Irish Singles Chart on 26 November 2009 at number 20. It also entered the UK Singles Chart on 29 November 2009 at no. 37.

Chart (2009)	Peak position
Australia (ARIA)	66
Belgium (Ultratop 50 Flanders)	18
Belgium (Ultratop 50 Wallonia)	27
Canada Hot 100 (Billboard)	65
France Download (SNEP)	37
Ireland (IRMA)	20
Spain (Promusicae)	49
Switzerland (Schweizer Hitparade)	37
UK Singles (Official Charts)	37
US Billboard Hot 100	62
Scotland (The Official Charts Company)	27

== 2012 film version ==
"I Dreamed a Dream"

Song by Anne Hathaway

from the album Les Misérables: Highlights from the Motion Picture Soundtrack
- Published: 1980
- Released: 21 December 2012
- Recorded: 2012
- Genre: Musical; theatrical; pop
- Length: 4:38
- Label: Universal Republic
- Composer: Claude-Michel Schönberg
- Lyricist: Herbert Kretzmer

"I Dreamed a Dream" was covered again for the 2012 film adaption. The movie was produced by Working Title Films and directed by Tom Hooper from a script by William Nicholson, Alain Boublil and Claude-Michel Schönberg with Herbert Kretzmer. The role of Fantine was played by Anne Hathaway for which she won the Academy Award for Best Supporting Actress. The film changed the ordering of some songs, and this song was swapped around with "Lovely Ladies", to place dramatic emphasis on Fantine's depression, after she has become a prostitute. As with the rest of the film, the vocals for the song were recorded by Hathaway, live on the set, and later edited together with the music.

Her performance of the song was released as part of the Les Misérables: Highlights from the Motion Picture Soundtrack on 21 December 2012 and was confirmed to be featured in the deluxe edition of the album as well. It was well received by music critics and it was very commercially successful, entering the U.S. Billboard Hot 100 and reaching the top thirty of the UK Singles Chart, along with entering various other singles charts around the world.

=== Reception ===
==== Critical reception ====
In his largely negative review of Les Misérables: Highlights from the Motion Picture Soundtrack, Rolling Stone's Jody Rosen mentions Hathaway's rendition of the classic as one of the two decent tracks on the compilation, stating that "There are a couple of redeeming moments on this chart-topping soundtrack; Sacha Baron Cohen has fun with the jaunty 'Master of the House', and Anne Hathaway gives the schmaltzy 'I Dreamed a Dream' her all."

==== Commercial reception ====
On the week ending 19 January 2013 the song entered and peaked in the U.S. Billboard Hot 100 at number 69, and spent a total of three weeks on the chart. The song was also a hit on the UK Singles Chart, where it peaked at number 22 and spent six weeks on the chart. In May 2022, it was certified silver by the British Phonographic Industry (BPI) for sales and streams exceeding 200,000 units. It was also present for a week on the Canadian Hot 100 at number 73. Among others, the song has also peaked in the Irish Singles Chart at number 26, the Dutch Top 100 at number 58, and the Spanish Singles Chart at number 21. The song has also been atop the iTunes Top Soundtrack Songs in Romania since January 2013, where the song sold over 6,000 digital copies.

=== Certifications ===
Region	Certification	Certified units/sales
United Kingdom (BPI)	Silver	200,000^{‡}
^{‡} Sales+streaming figures based on certification alone.

== Tomomi Kahara version ==
"Yume Yaburete (I Dreamed a Dream)"

Single by Tomomi Kahara

from the album Dream: Self Cover Best
- Released: 17 April 2013
- Genre: Pop
- Length: 3:52
- Label: Universal J
- Songwriters: Claude-Michel Schönberg (music); Tokiko Iwatani (Japanese lyrics)
- Producer: Satoshi Takebe

Tomomi Kahara singles chronology
"Ano Sayonara ni Sayonara o" (2006)	"Yume Yaburete (I Dreamed a Dream)" (2013)

"Yume Yaburete (I Dreamed a Dream)" (夢やぶれて -I DREAMED A DREAM-; lit. "Broken Dreams") is Tomomi Kahara's twenty-seventh single and first in over seven years. "Yume Yaburete" is the Japanese version of "I Dreamed a Dream" from the musical Les Misérables. The Japanese lyrics were written by lyricist and translator Tokiko Iwatani. Despite being famously sung by Hiromi Iwasaki, the Japanese rendition of "I Dreamed a Dream" was never released as a single until Kahara's cover. The song was suggested for Kahara's comeback by executives at Universal J, Kahara's record label and the one behind the Japanese release of the soundtrack for the 2012 film adaptation of Les Misérables. Coincidentally, the song happened to be a favorite of Kahara's that she often sang at auditions.

The song was recorded with a backing orchestra of 41 musicians. The cover art for the single pays homage to the musical and the character of Fantine by depicting Kahara as a broken but hopeful woman. The single also includes a piano version of "Yume Yaburete" as well as a self-cover of Kahara's 1996 hit song "I'm Proud". First pressing of the single includes a DVD featuring the music video for "Yume Yaburete".

=== Commercial performance ===
"Yume Yaburete (I Dreamed a Dream)" entered the Oricon weekly singles chart at number 13, marking Kahara's first top 20 single since "Anata ga Ireba" (2004).

=== Track ===
CD
No.	Title	Length
1.	"Yume Yaburete (I Dreamed a Dream)" (夢やぶれて "Broken Dreams")	3:52
2.	"I'm Proud" (2013 Orchestra Version)	4:44
3.	"Yume Yaburete (I Dreamed a Dream)" (Piano Version)	4:02
4.	"Yume Yaburete (I Dreamed a Dream)" (Instrumental)	3:52
5.	"I'm Proud" (2013 Orchestra Version – Instrumental)	4:42
Total length:		21:14

DVD
No.	Title	Length
1.	"Yume Yaburete (I Dreamed a Dream)" (Music Video)

=== Charts ===
Chart (2013)	Peak position
Japan Billboard Hot 100	6
Japan Hot Top Airplay (Billboard)	5
Japan Hot Singles Sales (Billboard)	9
Japan Daily Singles (Oricon)	11
Japan Weekly Singles (Oricon)	13
Japan Weekly Singles (Recochoku)	34
