= New Zealand top 50 albums of 2015 =

This is a list of the top-selling albums in New Zealand for 2015 from the Official New Zealand Music Chart's end-of-year chart, compiled by Recorded Music NZ. The chart includes 12 albums by New Zealand artists, including two albums by popera trio Sol3 Mio. The chart also includes 12 albums that featured in the New Zealand top 50 albums of 2014.

== Chart ==
Key
‡ – Album of New Zealand origin

Rank	Artist	Title
1	Adele	25
2	Ed Sheeran	x
3	Sam Smith	In the Lonely Hour
4	Six60	Six60^{‡}
5	Taylor Swift	1989
6	Sol3 Mio	On Another Note^{‡}
7	Meghan Trainor	Title
8	The Script	No Sound Without Silence
9	Cilla Black	The Very Best of Cilla Black
10	Hozier	Hozier
11	Michael Bublé	Christmas
12	Justin Bieber	Purpose
13	George Ezra	Wanted on Voyage
14	Florence and the Machine	How Big, How Blue, How Beautiful
15	Sol3 Mio	Sol3 Mio^{‡}
16	Dennis Marsh	Lest We Forget^{‡}
17	Eagles	Selected Works: 1972–1999
18	Josh Groban	Stages
19	Mumford & Sons	Wilder Mind
20	Various artists	Fifty Shades of Grey: Original Motion Picture Soundtrack
21	Maroon 5	V
22	Ed Sheeran	+
23	Gin Wigmore	Blood to Bone^{‡}
24	James Bay	Chaos and the Calm
25	Fleetwood Mac	25 Years – The Chain
26	Fat Freddy's Drop	Bays^{‡}
27	Kendrick Lamar	To Pimp a Butterfly
28	One Direction	Made in the A.M.
29	The Quin Tikis	The Quin Tikis: New Zealand's Premier Maori Showband^{‡}
30	Various artists	Frozen: The Songs
31	Foster and Allen	After All These Years: The Very Best of Foster and Allen
32	Mark Knopfler	Tracker
33	Stan Walker	Truth & Soul^{‡}
34	Imagine Dragons	Smoke + Mirrors
35	Dr. Dre	Compton
36	Diana Krall	Wallflower
37	Broods	Evergreen^{‡}
38	Neil Diamond	All-Time Greatest Hits
39	David Gilmour	Rattle That Lock
40	Devilskin	We Rise^{‡}
41	Various artists	Guardians of the Galaxy: Awesome Mix Vol. 1 (Original Motion Picture Soundtrack)
42	Adele	21
43	Various artists	Furious 7: Original Motion Picture Soundtrack
44	The Beatles	1
45	Muse	Drones
46	The Weeknd	Beauty Behind the Madness
47	Howard Morrison	How Great Thou Art: The Very Best of Howard Morrison^{‡}
48	Disturbed	Immortalized
49	Avalanche City	We are for the Wild Places^{‡}
50	AC/DC	Rock or Bust

== Top 20 albums of 2015 by New Zealand artists ==
Rank	Artist	Title
1	Six60	Six60
2	Sol3 Mio	On Another Note
3	Sol3 Mio	Sol3 Mio
4	Dennis Marsh	Lest We Forget
5	Gin Wigmore	Blood to Bone
6	Fat Freddy's Drop	Bays
7	The Quin Tikis	The Quin Tikis: New Zealand's Premier Maori Showband
8	Stan Walker	Truth & Soul
9	Broods	Evergreen
10	Devilskin	We Rise
11	Howard Morrison	How Great Thou Art: The Very Best of Howard Morrison
12	Avalanche City	We Are For the Wild Places
13	Lorde	Pure Heroine
14	Marlon Williams	Marlon Williams
15	Six60	Six60
16	Beau Monga	Beau Monga
17	Don McGlashan	Lucky Stars
18	John Hore Grenell	Welcome to my World: The Very Best of John Hore Grenell
19	Dennis Marsh	Maori Songbook 2
20	Stan Walker	The Platinum Collection
