= List of number-one albums from the 2010s (New Zealand) =

This is the Recorded Music NZ list of number-one albums in New Zealand during the 2010s decade. Adele's 2011 album 21 charted at number one for a total of 38 weeks, and was the top-selling album in both 2011 and 2012. New Zealand vocal trio Sol3 Mio had the top selling album in 2013, despite their self-titled album being released only in November 2013.

In New Zealand, Recorded Music NZ compiles the top 40 albums chart each Monday. Over-the-counter sales of both physical and digital formats make up the data. Certifications are awarded for the number of shipments to retailers. Gold certifications are awarded after 7,500 sales, and platinum certifications after 15,000.

The following albums were all number one in New Zealand in the 2010s.

== Number ones ==
Key

* – Number-one album of the year (Note: Annual charts are sourced from the RMNZ website.)
† – Album of New Zealand origin (Note: Whether or not a song is of New Zealand origin is determined by RMNZ)
‡ – Number-one album of the year, of New Zealand origin

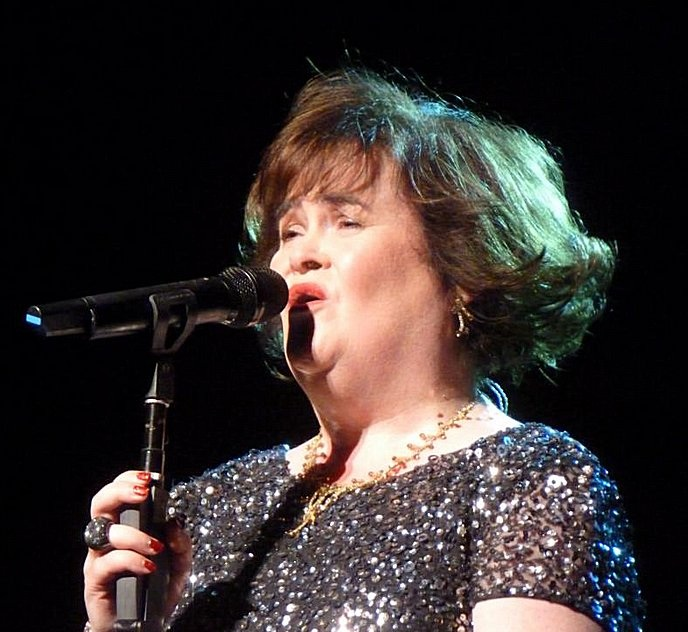
Scottish singer Susan Boyle had the first number one album of the 2010s, with I Dreamed a Dream, and had two others chart at number one over the decade.

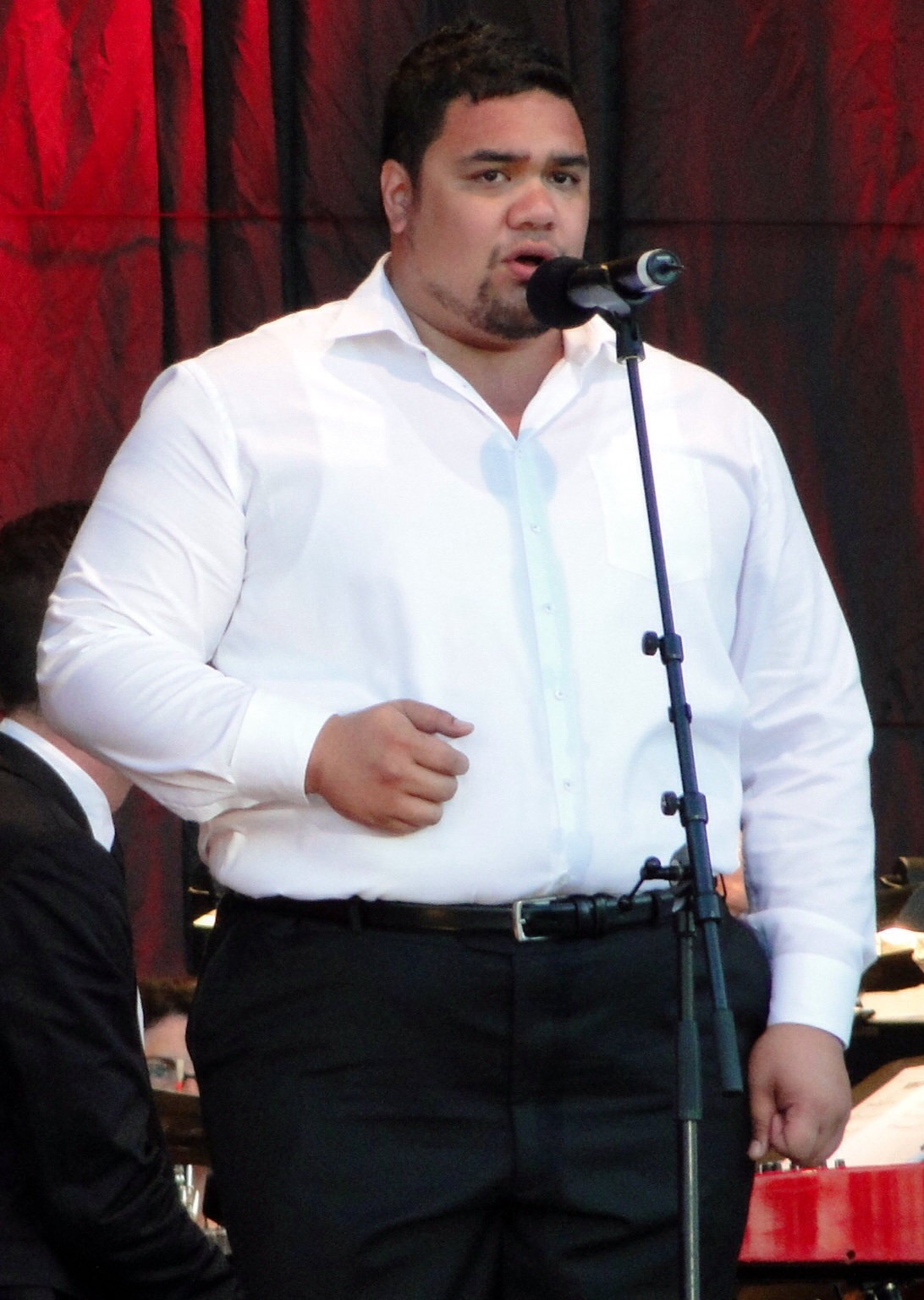
Pene Pati, of New Zealand vocal group Sol3 Mio, had the number one album in 2013.

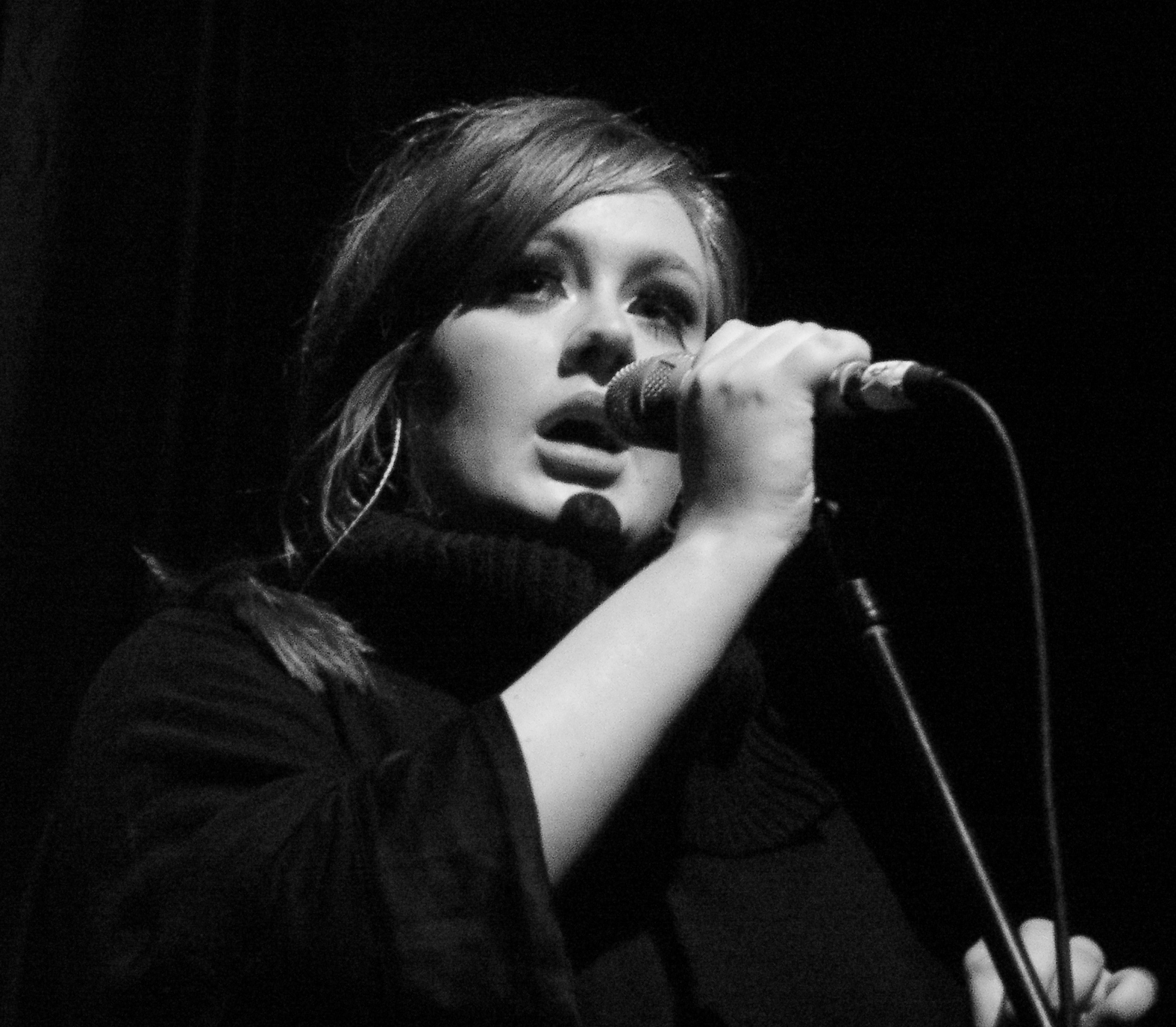
English singer Adele spent 38 weeks at number one with her album 21.

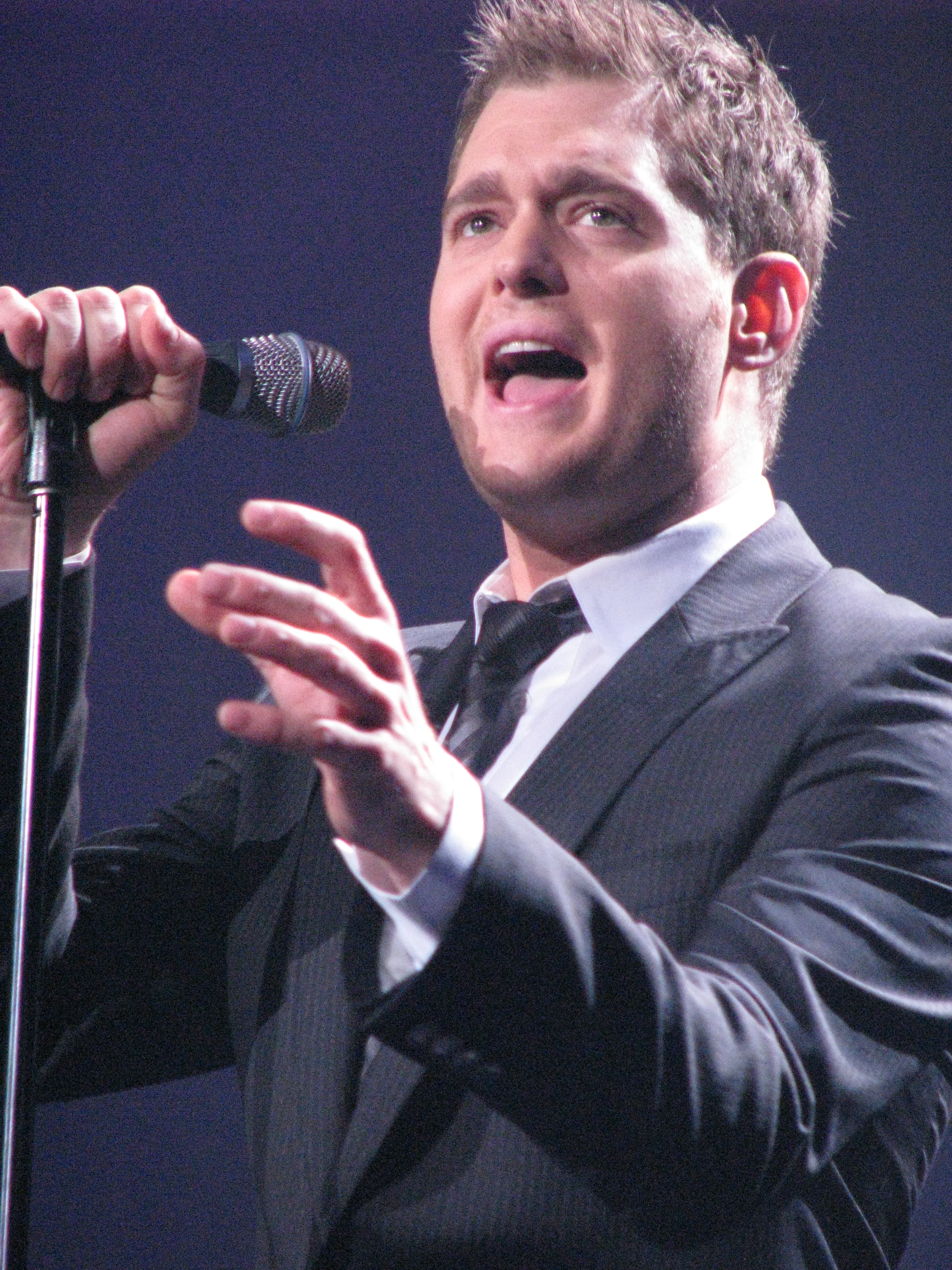
Canadian Michael Bublé's Christmas album has charted at number one in 2011, 2012, 2014 and 2016

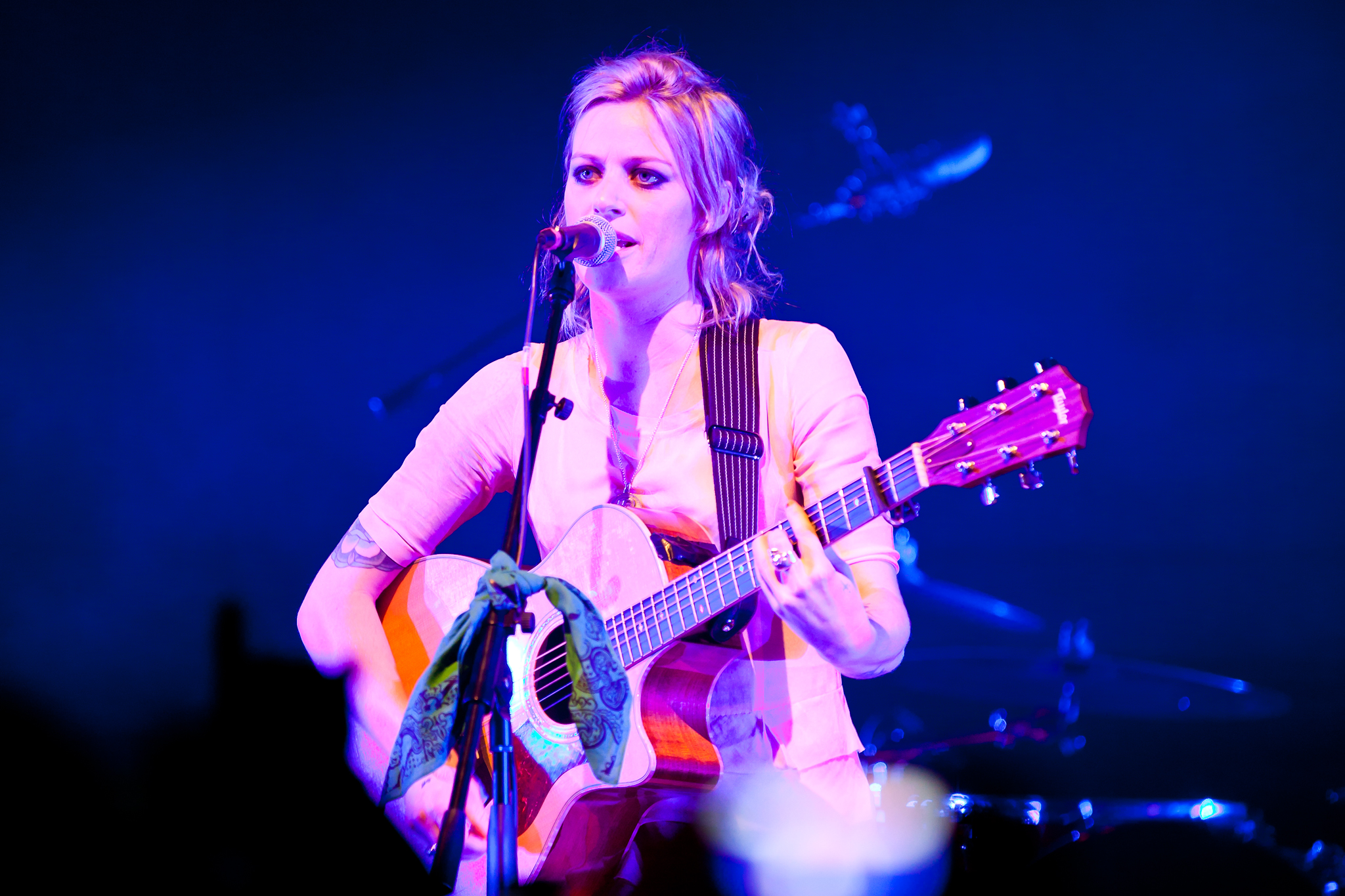
New Zealand singer Gin Wigmore saw all her three albums reach number one.

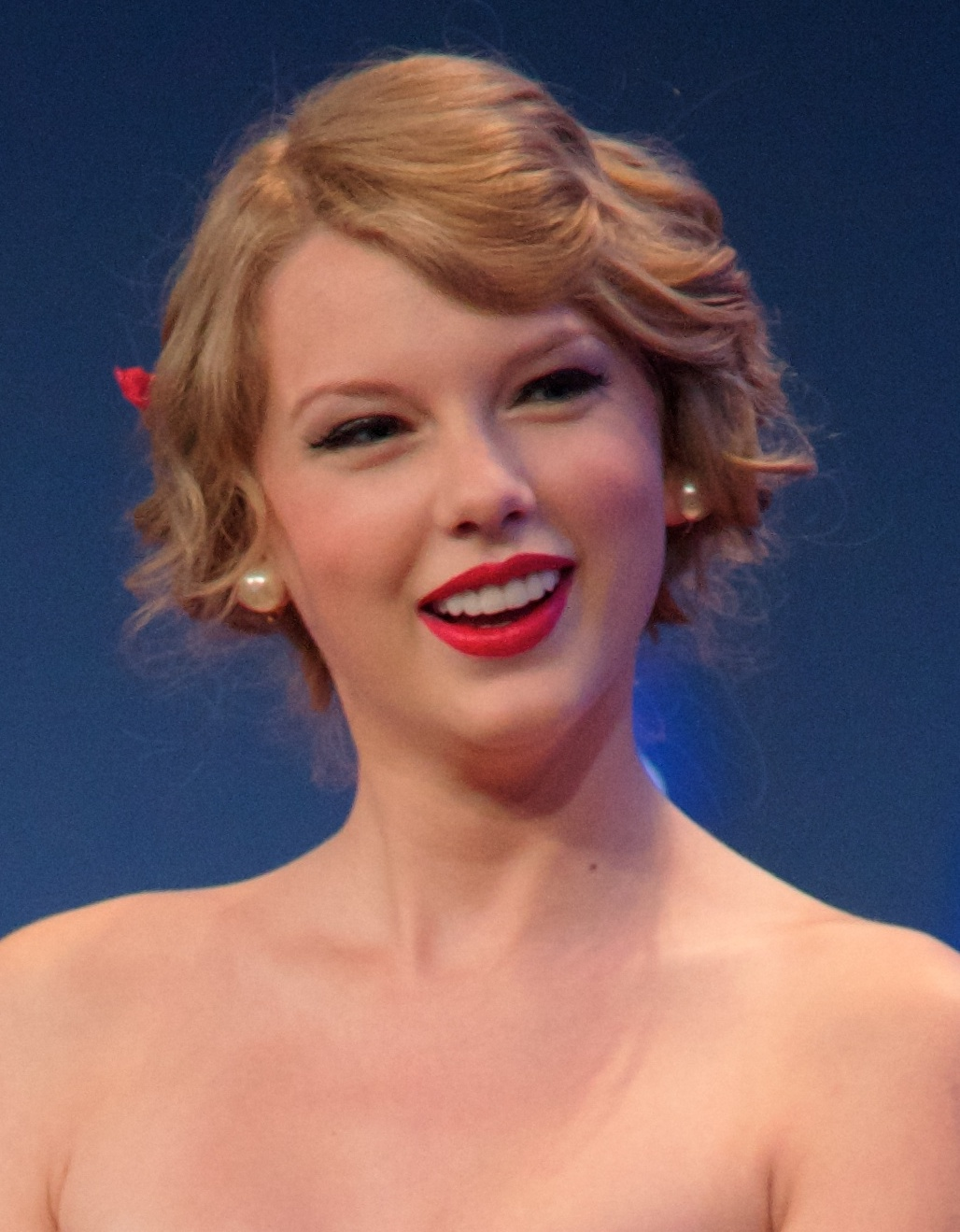
American country pop singer Taylor Swift had five albums reach number one: Speak Now, Red, 1989, Reputation and Lover, and has spent 14 weeks at number one.

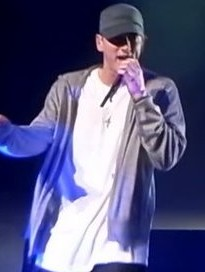
American rapper Eminem charted for six consecutive weeks with his album Recovery.

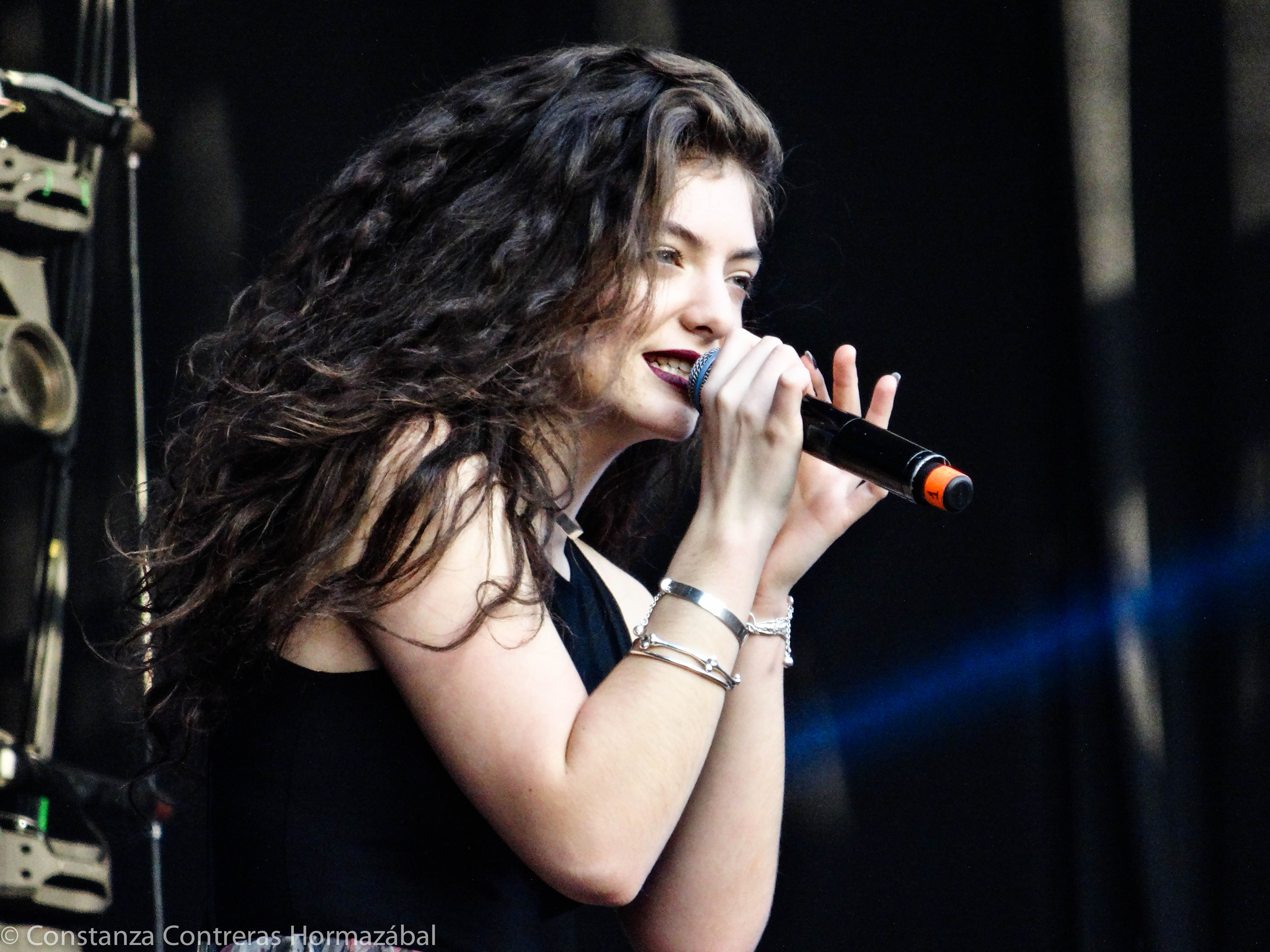
New Zealand singer Lorde had her debut album Pure Heroine chart in 2013 and 2014, with quintuple platinum sales.

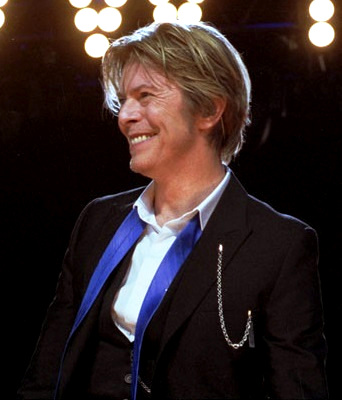
English musician David Bowie topped the charts in January 2016 just days after he died of cancer, with his album Blackstar.

Artist	Album	Weeks at number one	Reached number one	Certification	Ref
Susan Boyle	I Dreamed a Dream	4	4 January 2010	Platinum ×11	
Glee Cast	Glee: The Music, Volume 2	1	1 February 2010	Gold	
Susan Boyle	I Dreamed a Dream	2	8 February 2010	Platinum ×11	
Gin Wigmore	Holy Smoke^{†}	3	22 February 2010	Platinum ×4	
Lady Gaga	The Fame Monster (Note: The Fame Monster was a deluxe issue of The Fame, therefore their sales were collated together.)	1	15 March 2010	Platinum ×5	
Hollie Smith	Humour and the Misfortune of Others^{†}	1	22 March 2010	—	
Lady Gaga	The Fame Monster	1	29 March 2010	Platinum ×5	
Dane Rumble	The Experiment^{†}	1	5 April 2010	Gold	
Slash	Slash	2	12 April 2010	Platinum	
AC/DC	Iron Man 2	1	26 April 2010	Gold	
Justin Bieber	My Worlds (Note: My Worlds was an international double-release of My World and My World 2.0)	1	3 May 2010	Platinum ×2	
Susan Boyle	I Dreamed a Dream	1	10 May 2010	Platinum ×11	
Justin Bieber	My Worlds	2	17 May 2010	Platinum ×2	
Lady Antebellum	Need You Now	1	31 May 2010	Platinum	
Jack Johnson	To the Sea	1	7 June 2010	Platinum	
Justin Bieber	My Worlds	1	14 June 2010	Platinum ×2	
Lady Antebellum	Need You Now	1	21 June 2010	Platinum	
Eminem	Recovery	6	28 June 2010	Platinum	
Opshop	Until the End of Time^{†}	1	9 August 2010	—	
Eminem	Recovery	1	16 August 2010	Platinum	
Iron Maiden	The Final Frontier	1	23 August 2010	—	
Stan Walker	From the Inside Out^{†}	1	30 August 2010	Platinum	
Disturbed	Asylum	1	6 September 2010	Gold	
The Naked and Famous	Passive Me, Aggressive You^{†}	1	13 September 2010	—	
Linkin Park	A Thousand Suns	1	20 September 2010	Gold	
Shihad	Ignite^{†}	1	27 September 2010	Gold	
Katy Perry	Teenage Dream	1	4 October 2010	Platinum ×3	
Gin Wigmore	Holy Smoke^{†}	1	11 October 2010	Platinum ×4	
Brooke Fraser	Flags^{†}	1	18 October 2010	Platinum ×2	
Kings of Leon	Come Around Sundown	1	25 October 2010	Platinum	
Taylor Swift	Speak Now	2	1 November 2010	Platinum ×3	
Susan Boyle	The Gift	7	15 November 2010	Platinum ×4	
Artist	Album	Weeks at number one	Reached number one	Certification	Ref
Ronan Keating	Duet	1	3 January 2011	Platinum ×2	
Mumford & Sons	Sigh No More	3	10 January 2011	Platinum ×2	
Adele	21	2	31 January 2011	Platinum ×13	
Pink	Greatest Hits... So Far!!!	1	14 February 2011	Platinum ×3	
House of Shem	Island Vibration^{†}	1	21 February 2011	—	
Adele	21	1	28 February 2011	Platinum ×13	
Mumford & Sons	Sigh No More	1	7 March 2011	Platinum ×2	
Tiki	In the World of Light^{†}	1	14 March 2011	—	
Adele	21	2	21 March 2011	Platinum ×13	
Dennis Marsh	Maori Songbook^{†}	1	4 April 2011	—	
Adele	21	1	11 April 2011	Platinum ×13	
Foo Fighters	Wasting Light	3	18 April 2011	Platinum	
Hayley Westenra	Paradiso^{†}	1	9 May 2011	Gold	
Adele	21	2	16 May 2011	Platinum ×13	
Lady Gaga	Born This Way	1	30 May 2011	Platinum	
Adele	21	13	6 June 2011	Platinum ×13	
Red Hot Chili Peppers	I'm with You	1	5 September 2011	Gold	
Adele	21	5	12 September 2011	Platinum ×13	
Six60	Six60^{†}	2	17 October 2011	Platinum ×10	
Coldplay	Mylo Xyloto	1	31 October 2011	Platinum ×2	
Florence and the Machine	Ceremonials	1	7 November 2011	Platinum	
Gin Wigmore	Gravel & Wine^{†}	2	14 November 2011	Platinum ×2	
Rihanna	Talk That Talk	1	28 November 2011	Platinum	
Michael Bublé	Christmas	4	5 December 2011	Platinum ×12	
Artist	Album	Weeks at number one	Reached number one	Certification	Ref
Adele	21	5	2 January 2012	Platinum ×13	
Leonard Cohen	Old Ideas	2	6 February 2012	Gold	
Adele	21	1	20 February 2012	Platinum ×13	
Reece Mastin	Reece Mastin	1	27 February 2012	Gold	
Adele	21	2	5 March 2012	Platinum ×13	
Bruce Springsteen	Wrecking Ball	1	19 March 2012	—	
One Direction	Up All Night	1	26 March 2012	Platinum ×3	
Adele	21	2	2 April 2012	Platinum ×13	
The Black Seeds	Dust and Dirt^{†}	1	16 April 2012	—	
One Direction	Up All Night	2	23 April 2012	Platinum ×3	
Home Brew	Home Brew^{†}	1	7 May 2012	—	
Adele	21	1	14 May 2012	Platinum ×13	
Rod Stewart	Storyteller – The Complete Anthology: 1964–1990	1	21 May 2012	Gold	
Slash feat. Myles Kennedy and The Conspirators	Apocalyptic Love	1	28 May 2012	Gold	
John Mayer	Born and Raised	1	4 June 2012	—	
Frankie Valli & The Four Seasons	Jersey's Best: The Very Best of Frankie Valli & The Four Seasons	2	11 June 2012	Platinum	
Justin Bieber	Believe	1	25 June 2012	Gold	
Linkin Park	Living Things	2	2 July 2012	Gold	
Chris Brown	Fortune	1	16 July 2012	—	
Adele	21	1	23 July 2012	Platinum ×13	
Justin Bieber	Believe	1	30 July 2012	Gold	
Peter Posa	White Rabbit: The Very Best Of^{†}	6	6 August 2012	Platinum	
The xx	Coexist	1	17 September 2012	—	
Pink	The Truth About Love	1	24 September 2012	Platinum ×3	
Mumford & Sons	Babel	1	1 October 2012	Platinum ×2	
Muse	The 2nd Law	1	8 October 2012	Gold	
Pink	The Truth About Love	2	15 October 2012	Platinum ×3	
Taylor Swift	Red	3	29 October 2012	Platinum ×2	
One Direction	Take Me Home	1	19 November 2012	Platinum ×2	
Led Zeppelin	Celebration Day	1	26 November 2012	Platinum	
Susan Boyle	Standing Ovation: The Greatest Songs from the Stage	1	3 December 2012	Platinum	
Rod Stewart	Merry Christmas, Baby	3	10 December 2012	Platinum ×2	
Michael Bublé	Christmas	1	31 December 2012	Platinum ×12	
Artist	Album	Weeks at number one	Reached number one	Certification	Ref
Mumford & Sons	Babel	1	7 January 2013	Platinum ×2	
Ed Sheeran	+	2	14 January 2013	Platinum ×5	
Various artists	Les Misérables: Highlights from the Motion Picture Soundtrack	3	28 January 2013	Gold	
Various artists	Mt. Zion^{†}	1	18 February 2013	—	
Nick Cave and the Bad Seeds	Push the Sky Away	1	25 February 2013	—	
Macklemore and Ryan Lewis	The Heist	1	4 March 2013	Platinum	
Pink	The Truth About Love	1	11 March 2013	Platinum ×3	
David Bowie	The Next Day	1	18 March 2013	Gold	
Justin Timberlake	The 20/20 Experience	1	25 March 2013	Gold	
Pink	The Truth About Love	2	1 April 2013	Platinum ×3	
Paramore	Paramore	1	15 April 2013	—	
Michael Bublé	To Be Loved	5	22 April 2013	Platinum	
Daft Punk	Random Access Memories	2	27 May 2013	Platinum	
Shapeshifter	Delta^{†}	1	10 June 2013	Gold	
Black Sabbath	13	1	17 June 2013	—	
Kanye West	Yeezus	1	24 June 2013	—	
Fat Freddy's Drop	Blackbird^{†}	4	1 July 2013	Platinum	
Charley Pride	40 Years of Pride	1	29 July 2013	Gold	
Dennis Marsh	Country Songbook^{†}	1	5 August 2013	—	
Charley Pride	40 Years of Pride	1	12 August 2013	Gold	
Jackie Thomas	Jackie Thomas^{†}	1	19 August 2013	Gold	
Harrison Craig	More Than A Dream	1	26 August 2013	—	
Fleetwood Mac	25 Years – The Chain	2	2 September 2013	Platinum	
Arctic Monkeys	AM	1	16 September 2013	Platinum	
Blacklistt	Blacklistt^{†}	1	23 September 2013	—	
Kings of Leon	Mechanical Bull	1	30 September 2013	—	
Lorde	Pure Heroine^{†}	4	7 October 2013	Platinum ×5	
Katy Perry	Prism	1	4 November 2013	Platinum ×2	
Eminem	The Marshall Mathers LP 2	2	11 November 2013	Platinum	
Sol3 Mio	Sol3 Mio^{‡}	9	25 November 2013	Platinum ×8	
Artist	Album	Weeks at number one	Reached number one	Certification	Ref
Bruce Springsteen	High Hopes	1	27 January 2014	Gold	
Lorde	Pure Heroine^{†}	2	3 February 2014	Platinum ×5	
Dolly Parton	Blue Smoke	1	17 February 2014	—	
Lorde	Pure Heroine^{†}	2	24 February 2014	Platinum ×5	
Bruce Springsteen	High Hopes	1	10 March 2014	Gold	
Sol3 Mio	Sol3 Mio^{†}	5	17 March 2014	Platinum ×8	
Various artists	Frozen: Original Motion Picture Soundtrack	3	21 April 2014	Platinum ×3	
Sol3 Mio	Sol3 Mio^{†}	2	12 May 2014	Platinum ×8	
Coldplay	Ghost Stories	3	26 May 2014	Gold	
Ellie Goulding	Halcyon Days	1	16 June 2014	Platinum	
Lana Del Rey	Ultraviolence	1	23 June 2014	—	
Ed Sheeran	X	1	30 June 2014	Platinum ×13	
5 Seconds of Summer	5 Seconds of Summer	1	7 July 2014	Gold	
Ed Sheeran	X	1	14 July 2014	Platinum ×13	
Devilskin	We Rise^{†}	3	21 July 2014	Platinum	
Ed Sheeran	X	1	11 August 2014	Platinum ×13	
Shihad	FVEY^{†}	1	18 August 2014	Gold	
INXS	The Very Best	1	25 August 2014	Platinum	
Broods	Evergreen^{†}	1	1 September 2014	Gold	
Sam Smith	In the Lonely Hour	4	8 September 2014	Platinum ×4	
Leonard Cohen	Popular Problems	1	6 October 2014	—	
Ed Sheeran	X	3	13 October 2014	Platinum ×13	
Taylor Swift	1989	2	3 November 2014	Platinum ×8	
Pink Floyd	The Endless River	1	17 November 2014	Platinum	
One Direction	Four	1	24 November 2014	Gold	
Taylor Swift	1989	1	1 December 2014	Platinum ×8	
Michael Bublé	Christmas	4	8 December 2014	Platinum ×12	
Artist	Album	Weeks at number one	Reached number one	Certification	Ref
Taylor Swift	1989	1	5 January 2015	Platinum ×8	
Ed Sheeran	X	1	12 January 2015	Platinum ×13	
Meghan Trainor	Title	2	19 January 2015	Platinum	
Taylor Swift	1989	2	2 February 2015	Platinum ×8	
Sam Smith	In the Lonely Hour	3	16 February 2015	Platinum ×4	
Six60	Six60^{†}	2	9 March 2015	Platinum ×8	
Kendrick Lamar	To Pimp a Butterfly	1	23 March 2015	—	
Six60	Six60^{†}	1	30 March 2015	Platinum ×8	
Dennis Marsh	Lest We Forget^{†}	1	6 April 2015	Gold	
Ed Sheeran	X	3	13 April 2015	Platinum ×13	
Sam Smith	In the Lonely Hour	1	4 May 2015	Platinum ×4	
Ed Sheeran	X	2	11 May 2015	Platinum ×13	
The Script	No Sound Without Silence	2	25 May 2015	Platinum	
Florence and the Machine	How Big, How Blue, How Beautiful	1	8 June 2015	Gold	
Muse	Drones	1	15 June 2015	—	
The Script	No Sound Without Silence	1	22 June 2015	Platinum	
Ed Sheeran	X	1	29 June 2015	Platinum ×13	
Gin Wigmore	Blood to Bone^{†}	1	6 July 2015	—	
The Quin Tikis	The Quin Tikis: New Zealand's Premier Maori Show Band^{†}	2	13 July 2015	—	
Josh Groban	Stages	2	27 July 2015	—	
Meghan Trainor	Title	1	10 August 2015	Platinum	
Dr. Dre	Compton	1	17 August 2015	—	
Cilla Black	The Very Best of Cilla Black	5	24 August 2015	Platinum	
David Gilmour	Rattle That Lock	3	28 September 2015	—	
Sol3 Mio	On Another Note^{†}	2	19 October 2015	Platinum ×2	
Fat Freddy's Drop	Bays^{†}	1	2 November 2015	Gold	
Sol3 Mio	On Another Note^{†}	2	9 November 2015	Platinum ×2	
Justin Bieber	Purpose	1	23 November 2015	Platinum ×2	
Adele	25	7	30 November 2015	Platinum ×12	
Artist	Album	Weeks at number one	Reached number one	Certification	Ref
David Bowie	Blackstar	2	18 January 2016	Gold	
Adele	25	2	1 February 2016	Platinum ×12	
David Bowie	Nothing Has Changed	3	15 February 2016	Platinum	
The 1975	I Like It When You Sleep, for You Are So Beautiful Yet So Unaware of It	1	7 March 2016	—	
David Bowie	Nothing Has Changed	1	14 March 2016	Platinum	
Sol3 Mio	On Another Note^{†}	1	21 March 2016	Platinum ×2	
Adele	25	1	28 March 2016	Platinum ×12	
Zayn	Mind of Mine	1	4 April 2016	—	
Hollie Smith	Water or Gold^{†}	1	11 April 2016	—	
Deftones	Gore	1	18 April 2016	—	
Anika Moa	Songs for Bubbas 2^{†}	1	25 April 2016	—	
Prince	The Very Best of Prince	1	2 May 2016	Platinum	
Drake	Views	1	9 May 2016	—	
Beyoncé	Lemonade	2	16 May 2016	Gold	
Ariana Grande	Dangerous Woman	1	30 May 2016	—	
Flume	Skin	1	6 June 2016	—	
Prince	The Hits/The B-Sides	2	13 June 2016	Platinum	
Red Hot Chili Peppers	The Getaway	1	27 June 2016	—	
Broods	Conscious	4	4 July 2016	—	
Aaradhna	Brown Girl	1	1 August 2016	—	
Drake	Views	1	8 August 2016	—	
Various artists	Suicide Squad: The Album	2	15 August 2016	Gold	
Frank Ocean	Blonde	1	29 August 2016	—	
Various artists	Suicide Squad: The Album	2	5 September 2016	Gold	
Nick Cave and the Bad Seeds	Skeleton Tree	1	19 September 2016	—	
Various artists	Suicide Squad: The Album	1	26 September 2016	Gold	
Passenger	Young as the Morning, Old as the Sea	1	3 October 2016	—	
Bon Iver	22, A Million	1	10 October 2016	—	
Green Day	Revolution Radio	1	17 October 2016	—	
Kings of Leon	WALLS	1	24 October 2016	—	
Leonard Cohen	You Want It Darker	1	31 October 2016	Gold	
The Koi Boys	Meant to Be	1	7 November 2016	Platinum	
Prince Tui Teka	E Ipo: The Very Best Of	1	14 November 2016	Gold	
Devilskin	Be Like the River	1	21 November 2016	Gold	
Metallica	Hardwired... to Self-Destruct	1	28 November 2016	Gold	
Michael Bublé	Christmas	4	5 December 2016	Platinum ×12	
Artist	Album	Weeks at number one	Reached number one	Certification	Ref
Adele	25	4	2 January 2017	Platinum ×12	
Various artists	Moana: Original Motion Picture Soundtrack	2	30 January 2017	Platinum ×3	
Adele	25	1	13 February 2017	Platinum ×12	
Various artists	Moana: Original Motion Picture Soundtrack	3	20 February 2017	Platinum ×3	
Ed Sheeran	÷	15	13 March 2017	Platinum ×16	
Lorde	Melodrama^{†}	3	26 June 2017	Platinum ×2	
Ed Sheeran	÷	7	17 July 2017	Platinum ×16	
Queens of the Stone Age	Villains	1	4 September 2017	—	
Ed Sheeran	÷	2	11 September 2017	Platinum ×16	
Foo Fighters	Concrete and Gold	3	25 September 2017	Gold	
Ed Sheeran	÷	1	16 October 2017	Platinum ×16	
Pink	Beautiful Trauma	3	23 October 2017	Platinum ×2	
Sam Smith	The Thrill of It All	1	13 November 2017	Platinum	
Taylor Swift	Reputation	2	20 November 2017	Platinum ×4	
Sol3 Mio	A Very M3rry Christmas^{†}	4	4 December 2017	Platinum	
Artist	Album	Weeks at number one	Reached number one	Certification	Ref
Ed Sheeran	÷	5	1 January 2018	Platinum ×16	
Tomorrow People	BBQ Reggae^{†}	1	5 February 2018	—	
Various artists	The Greatest Showman: Original Motion Picture Soundtrack	2	12 February 2018	Platinum ×2	
Marlon Williams	Make Way for Love^{†}	1	26 February 2018	-	
Various artists	The Greatest Showman: Original Motion Picture Soundtrack	2	5 March 2018	Platinum ×2	
Ed Sheeran	÷	6	19 March 2018	Platinum ×16	
J. Cole	KOD	1	30 April 2018	—	
Post Malone	Beerbongs & Bentleys	5	7 May 2018	Platinum ×6	
Kanye West	Ye	2	11 June 2018	—	
Post Malone	Beerbongs & Bentleys	1	25 June 2018	Platinum ×6	
XXXTentacion	?	1	2 July 2018	Platinum	
Drake	Scorpion	3	9 July 2018	Platinum ×2	
Various artists	Mamma Mia! Here We Go Again: The Movie Soundtrack	2	30 July 2018	Gold	
Travis Scott	Astroworld	1	13 August 2018	Gold	
Various artists	Mamma Mia! Here We Go Again: The Movie Soundtrack	1	20 August 2018	Gold	
Ariana Grande	Sweetener	2	27 August 2018	Platinum	
Eminem	Kamikaze	5	10 September 2018	Platinum	
Twenty One Pilots	Trench	1	15 October 2018	—	
Eminem	Kamikaze	1	22 October 2018	Platinum	
Lady Gaga and Bradley Cooper	A Star Is Born	16	29 October 2018	Platinum ×3	
Artist	Album	Weeks at number one	Reached number one	Certification	Ref
Ariana Grande	Thank U, Next	7	18 February 2019	Platinum	
Billie Eilish	When We All Fall Asleep, Where Do We Go?	2	8 April 2019	Platinum ×5	
BTS	Map of the Soul: Persona	1	22 April 2019	—	
Billie Eilish	When We All Fall Asleep, Where Do We Go?	1	29 April 2019	Platinum ×5	
Pink	Hurts 2B Human	2	6 May 2019	Gold	
Billie Eilish	When We All Fall Asleep, Where Do We Go?	5	20 May 2019	Platinum ×5	
Bruce Springsteen	Western Stars	1	24 June 2019	—	
Billie Eilish	When We All Fall Asleep, Where Do We Go?	1	1 July 2019	Platinum ×5	
Beastwars	IV	1	8 July 2019	—	
Billie Eilish	When We All Fall Asleep, Where Do We Go?	1	15 July 2019	Platinum ×5	
Ed Sheeran	No.6 Collaborations Project	6	22 July 2019	Platinum ×3	
Taylor Swift	Lover	1	2 September 2019	Platinum ×3	
Tool	Fear Inoculum	1	9 September 2019	—	
Various artists	Waiata / Anthems	1	16 September 2019	—	
Post Malone	Hollywood's Bleeding	7	23 September 2019	Platinum ×4	
Kanye West	Jesus Is King	1	4 November 2019	—	
Post Malone	Hollywood's Bleeding	1	11 November 2019	Platinum ×4	
Six60	Six60	5	18 November 2019	Platinum ×5	
Harry Styles	Fine Line	2	23 December 2019	Platinum ×3	
