= 2016 in New Zealand music =

The following is a list of notable events that happened in 2016 in New Zealand music.

== Events ==
=== April ===
- 23 April: Polynesian singer Bill Sevesi died.

=== September ===
- 29 September: Pop singer Moana Maniapoto was inducted into the New Zealand Music Hall of Fame.

=== November ===
- 17 November:
  - R&B singer Aaradhna refused her hip-hop award on 2016 New Zealand Music Awards ceremony, due to her belief that the award was given due to her race instead of achievement.
  - Pop rock singer Bic Runga was inducted into the New Zealand Music Hall of Fame.
- 20 November: Parris Goebel's music video for the song Sorry won "Video of the Year" at the 2016 American Music Awards.
- 29 November: Ray Columbus, pop music singer and songwriter, died of illness.

== Releases ==
=== June ===
- 3 June: Wild Things, studio album by Ladyhawke
- 24 June: Conscious, studio album by Broods

=== November ===
- 15 November: Sol3 Mio, studio album by Sol3 Mio
- 18 November: Close Your Eyes, studio album by Bic Runga

== See also ==
- 2016 APRA Silver Scroll Awards
- 2016 New Zealand Music Awards
- New Zealand top 50 albums of 2016
- New Zealand top 50 singles of 2016
