= Amina Edris =

Egyptian/New Zealand lyric soprano

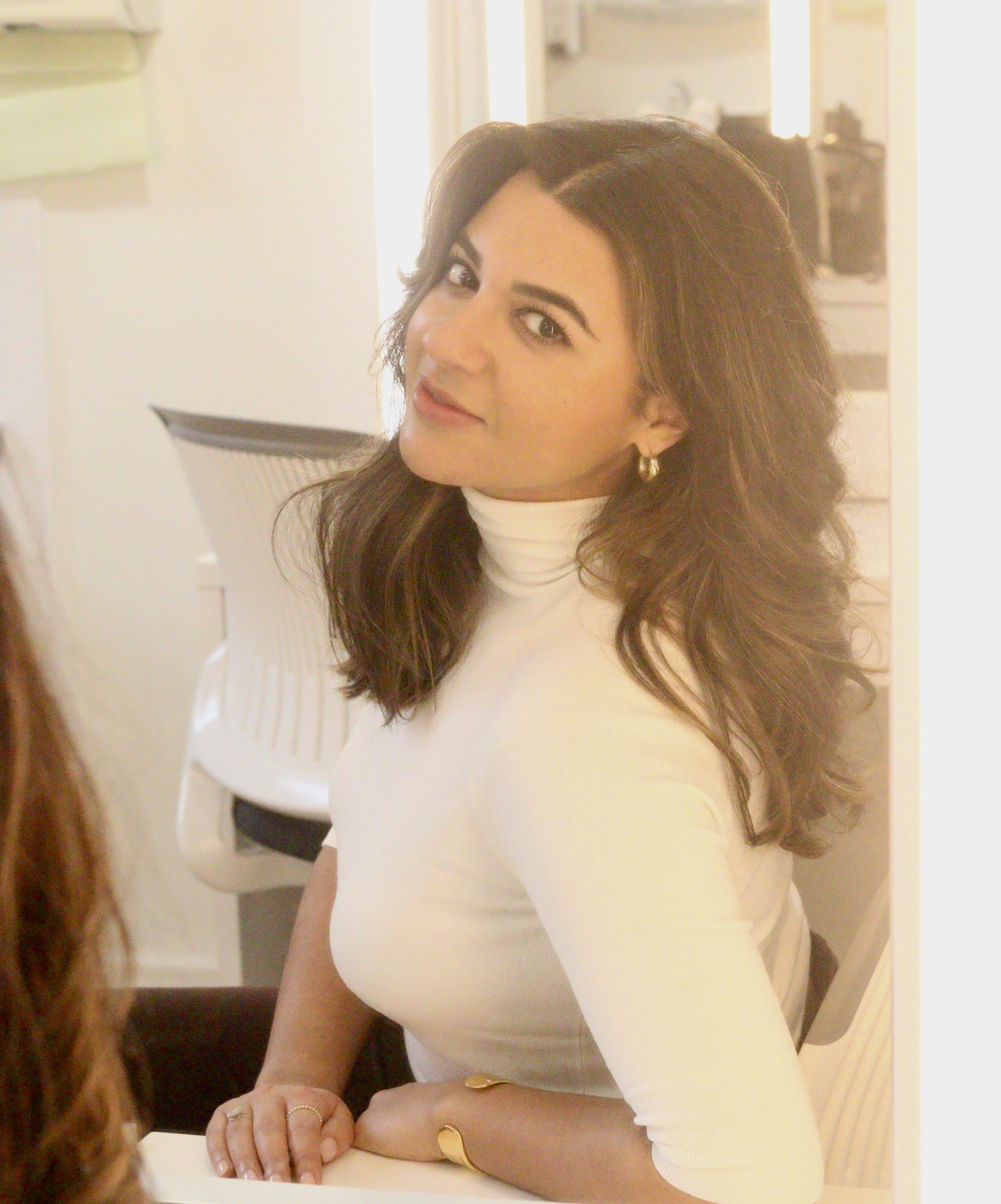
- Born: 1991 (age 34–35); Cairo, Egypt
- Occupation: Opera Singer
- Agent: Harrison Parrott
- Spouse: Pene Pati
- Website: https://www.aminaedris.com

Amina Edris (born 1991) is an Egyptian / New Zealand lyric soprano.

== Education ==
Edris was born in Cairo, Egypt, to parents who worked in the tourism industry. She was introduced to music as a child by her uncle who plays the lute, guitar and Egyptian percussion instruments.

Edris' musical studies began with piano lessons at age seven. The family moved to New Zealand in 2002, where she continued her musical studies in high school. In addition to private voice lessons, she was a member of the Barbershop Quartet and choir, and she played trombone in the school's orchestra, concert band and jazz band.

She initially enrolled in the University of Canterbury in Christchurch, New Zealand, as an Engineering student. After one semester, however, she auditioned and was accepted into the music programme, and began studying with Dame Malvina Major. In 2011, she graduated with her Bachelor of Music degree.

Her studies then brought her to Wales, where she enrolled in the master's degree programme at the Wales International Academy of Voice, studying under Dennis O'Neill. After graduating in 2013 with her Masters in Music, she met her current teacher, Cesar Ulloa, with whom she began private lessons before studying with him at the San Francisco Conservatory of Music as a postgraduate student. She was awarded her postgraduate diploma in 2015.

She was accepted into the Merola Program in the summer of 2015, where she made her role debut as Norina in Don Pasquale.

In 2016, she became an Adler Fellow at the San Francisco Opera. During her two years as a fellow she sang Frasquita in Carmen, Trainbearer in Elektra, Flower/Lady in Waiting in Dream of the Red Chamber, Countess Ceprano in Rigoletto, and Annina in La traviata. She also covered the roles of Karolka and Barna in Jenůfa, Norina in Don Pasquale, Zerlina in Don Giovanni, Musetta in La bohème, and the title role in Manon.

== Career ==
Edris made her professional debut with Opera San José as Susanna in Mozart's The Marriage of Figaro in 2015. In 2017, she sang Tina in the rarely performed opera Flight by Jonathan Dove with Opera Parallèle. In 2018, she made her debut with New Zealand Opera as Adina in L'elisir d'amore, followed by her debut with Washington National Opera as Glycère in Gounod's Sapho.

In 2019, she made her debut in France singing the title role in Manon at Opéra national de Bordeaux substituting for Nadine Sierra, receiving praise from the French press, including Le Monde that called her voice "beautiful and round". The same year, she returned to the San Francisco Opera for her debut in the role of Juliette in Gounod's Roméo et Juliette, followed by her debut at the Grand Théâtre de Genève as Fatime in Les Indes galantes. She returned to the role of Manon in February 2020, when she made her debut at the Paris Opera in a new production by Vincent Huguet.

Her concert repertoire includes Fauré's Requiem, Mahler's Symphony No. 4, Rossinis Petite messe solennelle, J. S. Bach's cantata Jauchzet Gott in allen Landen, BWV 51 and St John Passion, and Vivaldi's Lauda Jerusalem.

Her 2021/22 season began with a role debut as Alice (Robert le diable) at Opéra national de Bordeaux followed by her house and role debut at the Opéra du Rhin as Micaëla (Carmen). Another role and house debut she performed as part of this season was Violetta (La Traviata) at Opéra de Limoges followed by her house debut in the same role at the Canadian Opera Company. In the summer, Amina returned to the role of La Folie (Platée) under the baton of Marc Minkowski at Opéra national de Paris. To end the season, she debuted the role of Adalgisa (Norma) in concert at the Festival d’Aix-en-Provence.

At the start of the 2022/23 season, Ms. Edris performed the role of Cleopatra in the world premiere of John Adams’ opera, Antony and Cleopatra at San Francisco Opera. She then made her second role debut of the season, as Marguerite in Gounod’s Faust in a new production at Detroit Opera. To begin the new year, Ms. Edris made her debut with the Münchner Rundfunkorchester, performing Massenet’s Ariane. She then joined her husband, Pene Pati of Sol3 Mio, in Prague for a Gala concert.

Her 2023/24 season began with a return to the Canadian Opera Company to perform the role of Mimi in Puccini's La bohème. Ms. Edris then made her second role debut of the season, as Liu in Puccini’s Turandot at Teatro di San Carlo in Naples. In the new year she made her debut performing the title-role in a concert performance of Massenet's Thaïs at Opéra de Toulon. She then returned to the Opéra national de Paris to make her role-debut as Beatriz in Thomas Adès' The Exterminating Angel.

In the 2025/26 season, Amina Edris appears in three productions of Les Contes d’Hoffmann: making her Opéra Comique debut singing all four heroines under Pierre Dumoussaud, jumping in as Antonia for her Staatsoper Berlin debut, and performing Antonia for her Opéra national de Lyon debut under Emmanuel Villaume. She also makes a house debut at the Semperoper Dresden as Juliette (Roméo et Juliette). Edris returns to Opéra national de Paris as Micaëla (Carmen) under Keri-Lynn Wilson and debuts at The Metropolitan Opera as Musetta (La bohème) under Roberto Kalb. On the concert stage, she performs as soloist at the Diapason d’Or Gala at Théâtre des Champs-Elysées and appears in recital with tenor Pene Pati and pianist Mathieu Pordoy at Opéra national de Bordeaux. In summer 2026, she returns to New Zealand to sing the title role in Manon with Wellington Opera.

Edris is represented by Harrison Parrott.

== Repertoire ==
Her operatic repertoire spans from baroque to world premieres with a focus on French and Italian repertoire.

Role	Opera
Violetta	La Traviata (Giuseppe Verdi)
Mimì Musetta	La bohème (Giacomo Puccini)
Contessa Susanna	Le Nozze di Figaro (Wolfgang Amadeus Mozart)
Micaëla	Carmen (Georges Bizet)
Juliette	Roméo et Juliette (Charles Gounod)
Manon	Manon (Jules Massenet)
Marguerite	Faust (Charles Gounod)
Antonia	Les Cotes d'Hoffmann (Jaques Offenbach)
Glycère	Sapho (Charles Gounod)
La Folie	Platée (Jean-Philippe Rameau)
Leïla	Les pêcheurs de perles (Georges Bizet)
Alice	Robert le diable (Giacomo Meyerbeer)
Ariane	Ariane (Jules Massenet)
Adalgisa	Norma (Vincenzo Bellni)
Cleopatra	Antony and Cleopatra (John Adams)
Soprano	Mass in C Minor (Wolfgang Amadeus Mozart)
Berthe	Le prophète (Giacomo Meyerbeer)
Adina	L'elisir d'amore (Gaetano Donizetti)
Norina	Don Pasquale (Gaetano Donizetti)
Liù	Turandot (Giacomo Puccini)

== Personal life ==
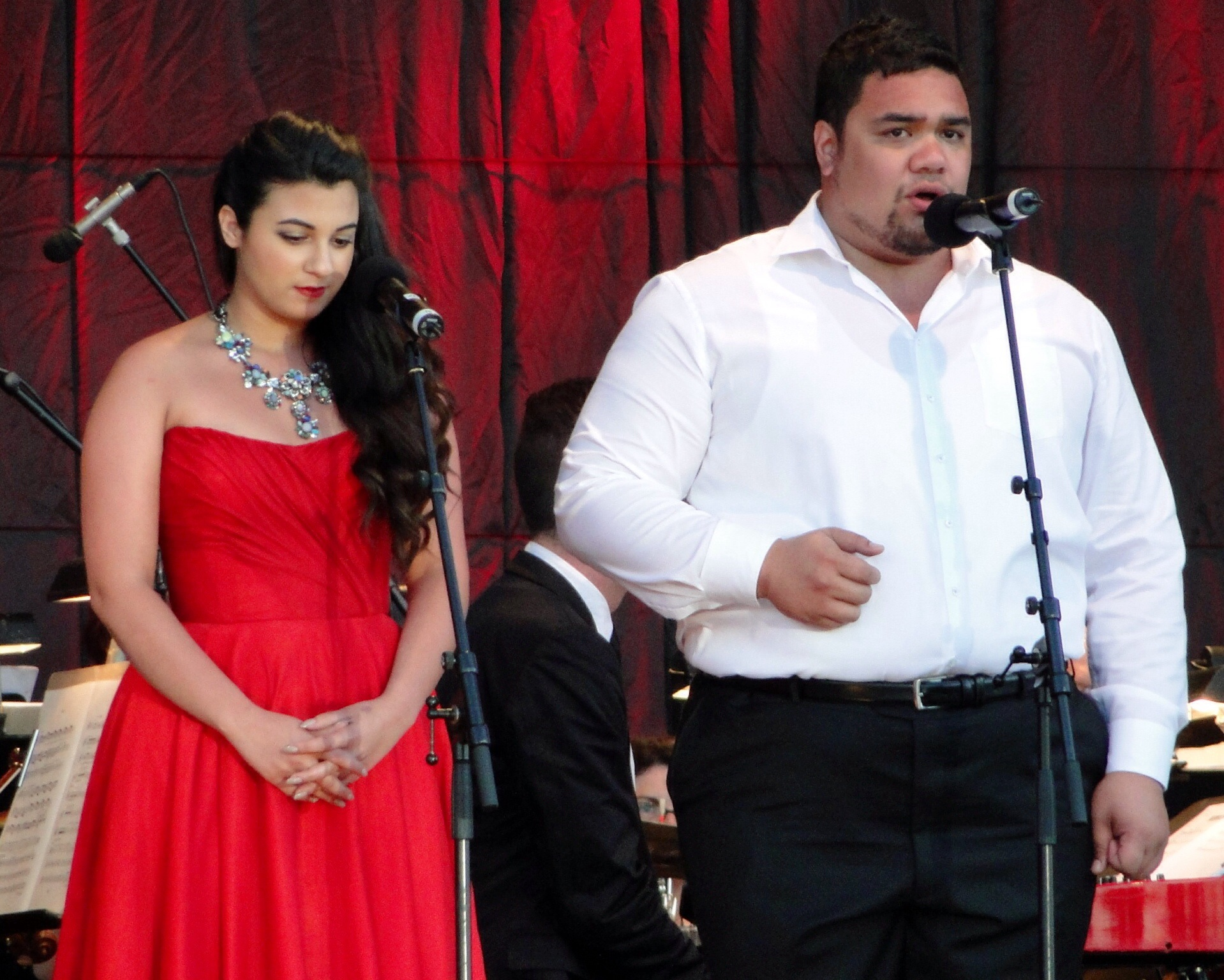
Edris and Pene Pati, 2014

Edris is married to Samoan/New Zealand tenor Pene Pati.

== Awards ==
- First Prize female Singer and Audience Prize, 2018 Concours Bordeaux Medoc Lyrique
- Winner of the Deborah Riedel Award, Joan Sutherland and Richard Bonynge Bel Canto Competition
- Winner, Sydney Eisteddfod McDonald's Operatic Aria Competition
- Winner, Palm Springs Opera Guild Competition 2016

== Recordings ==
- Robert le Diable, Palazzetto Bru Zane, September 23, 2022
- Ariane, Palazzetto Bru Zane (World Premiere Recording), September 8, 2023.
