= New Zealand top 50 albums of 2014 =

This is a list of the top-selling albums in New Zealand for 2014 from the Official New Zealand Music Chart's end-of-year chart, compiled by Recorded Music NZ. The chart includes six albums by New Zealand artists, including two albums by brother-sister duo Broods. The chart also includes 13 albums that featured in the New Zealand top 50 albums of 2013. The 2014 chart was the first to include online streaming as well as sales data.

== Chart ==
Key
‡ – Album of New Zealand origin

Rank	Artist	Title
1	Ed Sheeran	X
2	Sol3 Mio	Sol3 Mio^{‡}
3	Taylor Swift	1989
4	Sam Smith	In the Lonely Hour
5	Various artists	Frozen: Original Motion Picture Soundtrack
6	Lorde	Pure Heroine
7	Coldplay	Ghost Stories
8	Devilskin	We Rise^{‡}
9	Pink Floyd	The Endless River
10	Katy Perry	Prism
11	Arctic Monkeys	AM
12	Beyoncé	Beyoncé
13	Bruno Mars	Unorthodox Jukebox
14	Michael Bublé	To Be Loved
15	Michael Bublé	Christmas
16	Ed Sheeran	+
17	INXS	The Very Best
18	Foo Fighters	Sonic Highways
19	Broods	Evergreen^{‡}
20	Bruce Springsteen	High Hopes
21	Eagles	Selected Works: 1972–1999
22	Pharrell Williams	G I R L
23	Eminem	The Marshall Mathers LP 2
24	Ellie Goulding	Halcyon Days
25	Barbra Streisand	Partners
26	Shihad	FVEY^{‡}
27	Imagine Dragons	Night Visions
28	5 Seconds of Summer	5 Seconds of Summer
29	The Seekers	The Golden Jubilee Album
30	Rudimental	Home
31	One Direction	FOUR
32	Broods	Broods EP^{‡}
33	Lana Del Rey	Ultraviolence
34	George Ezra	Wanted on Voyage
35	Avicii	True
36	The Madden Brothers	Greetings from California
37	The Black Keys	Turn Blue
38	Adele	21
39	Whenua Patuwai	The Soul Sessions^{‡}
40	Various artists	Guardians of the Galaxy: Awesome Mix Vol. 1
41	OneRepublic	Native
42	ABBA	Gold: 40th Anniversary Edition
43	AC/DC	Rock or Bust
44	Lana Del Rey	Born to Die
45	One Direction	Midnight Memories
46	Leonard Cohen	Popular Problems
47	Paloma Faith	A Perfect Contradiction
48	John Legend	Love in the Future
49	Ariana Grande	My Everything
50	Pink	The Truth About Love
