= New Zealand top 50 albums of 2016 =

This is a list of the top-selling albums in New Zealand for 2016 from the Official New Zealand Music Chart's end-of-year chart, compiled by Recorded Music NZ. This list also shows top 20 albums in New Zealand.

== Chart ==
Key
‡ – Album of New Zealand origin

Rank	Artist	Title
1	Adele	25
2	Michael Bublé	Christmas
3	Justin Bieber	Purpose
4	Ed Sheeran	x
5	David Bowie	Nothing Has Changed
6	David Bowie	Blackstar
7	The Koi Boys ^{‡}	Meant To Be
8	Drake	Views
9	Twenty One Pilots	Blurryface
10	Charlie Puth	Nine Track Mind
11	Prince Tui Teka ^{‡}	E IPO: The Very Best of'
12	Beyoncé	Lemonade
13	Six60 ^{‡}	Six60
14	Sol3 Mio ^{‡}	On Another Note
15	Various	Suicide Squad
16	Coldplay	A Head Full of Dreams
17	Rolling Stones	Blue & Lonesome
18	Bruno Mars	24K Magic
19	Rihanna	Anti
20	Leonard Cohen	You Want It Darker
21	Sam Smith	In the Lonely Hour
22	Taylor Swift	1989
23	Broods ^{‡}	Conscious
24	Metallica	Hardwired... to Self-Destruct
25	Norah Jones	Day Breaks
26	Michael Bublé	Nobody but Me
27	Red Hot Chili Peppers	The Getaway
28	Disturbed	Immortalized
29	Elvis Presley	The Wonder of You
30	Prince	The Hits/The B-Sides
31	Sia	This Is Acting
32	Adele	21
33	Frank Ocean	Blonde
34	Prince	The Very Best of Prince
35	Devilskin ^{‡}	Be Like the River
36	The Weeknd	Beauty Behind the Madness
37	Sol3 Mio	Sol3 Mio
38	Guns N' Roses	Greatest Hits
39	Radiohead	A Moon Shaped Pool
40	One Direction	Made in the A.M.
41	Meghan Trainor	Title
42	Ellie Goulding	Delirium
43	Fleetwood Mac	25 Years – The Chain
44	Leonard Cohen	The Essential Leonard Cohen
45	Bob Marley and the Wailers	Legend
46	Ariana Grande	Dangerous Woman
47	Troye Sivan	Blue Neighbourhood
48	Tracy Chapman	Greatest Hits
49	Flume	Skin
50	Fat Freddy's Drop ^{‡}	Bays

== Top 20 Albums by New Zealand artists ==
Rank	Artist	Title
1	The Koi Boys	Meant To Be
2	Prince Tui Teka	EIPO: The Very Best Of
3	Six60	Six60
4	Sol3 Mio	On Another Note
5	Broods	Conscious
6	Devilskin	Be Like the River
7	Sol3 Mio	Sol3 Mio
8	Fat Freddy's Drop	Bays
9	Anika Moa	Songs for Bubbas 2
10	Various	Poi E: The Story of Our Song
11	Various	Stir It Up: Aotearoa Tribute to Bob Marley
12	Broods	Evergreen
13	Anika Moa	Songs for Bubbas 1
14	Lorde	Pure Heroine
15	Six60	Six60
16	Hollie Smith	Water or Gold
17	Dave Dobbyn	Harmony House
18	Aaradhna	Brown Girl
19	Marlon Williams	Marlon Williams
20	Shapeshifter	Stars
