= Pene Pati =

New Zealand opera tenor (born 1987)

- Born: 1987 (age 38–39); Apia, Samoa
- Occupation: Operatic tenor

Pene Pati (born 1987) is a Samoan-born New Zealand operatic tenor.

He has been singing on international stages since 2017 and has had a successful career, with some calling him one of the most prominent young opera artists. His tone is often compared to that of Luciano Pavarotti and his style in French opera as in Italian bel canto is appreciated.

He is a Warner Classics recording artist, and his self-titled debut recording was praised by numerous critics upon its release in March 2022. He has since released 2 additional albums, Nessun Dorma (2024), and Serenata a Napoli (2025).

== Biography ==
=== Childhood ===
Pene Pati's family emigrated from Samoa to Māngere, a suburb of Auckland, in 1989 where he spent his childhood and youth, singing with his family, then in a choir linked to the rugby team to which he belonged at college. He enjoyed singing despite not knowing much about opera composers, and his teacher encouraged him to persevere in the field.

In 2011, he was invited by tenor Dennis O'Neill to study in Cardiff, UK, to acquire good bel canto technique. There he also met the soprano Kiri Te Kanawa, whose foundation supported his training as a young tenor.

His career then went through several stages, first in New Zealand, where he lived for a long time in South Auckland. There, he performed with his brother Amitai, also a tenor, and a baritone cousin, Moses Mackay, as part of the trio Sol3 Mio (styled SOLΞ MIO), all three of Samoan origin. The band's self-title debut album featured a lyrical version of many popular and traditional songs, which also included famous opera arias such as "Nessun dorma" from Turandot. The album was the best-selling recording in New Zealand in 2014 and 2015, and the second in 2016, also winning first prize at the annual New Zealand Music Awards twice in a row.

The band released their second album, On Another Note, on 9 October 2015 on Universal Music Group. The album debuted at number one on the New Zealand Albums Chart.

=== International career ===
After winning several awards, including the second prize and the audience prize at Plácido Domingo's Operalia competition in 2015, the second prize at the Neue Stimmen competition, and the Bel Canto prize Joan Sutherland and Richard Bonynge as well as the Montserrat Caballé Prize in Spain, Pati tackled his first solo roles on the opera stage. He received a scholarship from the San Francisco Opera in 2013 and decided, after the Sol3 Mio experience, to finally approach opera. In 2017, he made his operatic debut as he played the Duke of Mantua in Rigoletto and critics immediately praised his performance, pointing out that he was still a young student of San Francisco Opera's Adler Program and already a revelation in the role.

He had another success with his role as Roméo in Roméo et Juliette, less than two years later, replacing the originally planned tenor Bryan Hymel. It was in the role of Percy in Anna Bolena that Pati made his debut in 2018 on European stages, at the Opéra de Bordeaux where he returned as Roméo in 2020 alongside Nadine Sierra. In Paris, his double debut was in 2021, as Nemorino in the Elisir d'amore at the Paris Opera, then, while he had sung Alfredo in La traviata in Amsterdam the day before, he replaced Jean-François Borras at the Opéra-Comique as Roméo. Now in high demand for lyric tenor roles, Pati also made his debut in the first quarter of 2022 successively at the Vienna State Opera as Percy in Anna Bolena, as Edgardo in Lucia di Lammermoor at the Teatro di San Carlo in Naples, as Nicias in Thaïs at the Théâtre des Champs-Élysées in Paris. During the summer, despite the fact that he contracted COVID on the eve of the Aix-en-Provence Festival, he performed as Amenophis in Rossini's Moïse et Pharaon, directed by Tobias Kratzer.

In the fall of 2022, he sang the Duke of Mantua again in Rigoletto at the Rouen Opera House in September, then, for the first time, Faust in the La damnation de Faust at the Opéra de Monte-Carlo in November on the occasion of Monaco's National Day and on the occasion of a tribute to Raoul Gunsbourg. In December he sang the title role in Mozart's Mitridate, re di Ponto at the Berlin State Opera conducted by Marc Minkowski (also recorded for DVD).

In March 2023, at the Bordeaux Opera, he took on the role of Ferdinand in Donizetti's La favorite, where he gave one of his first performances in France in 2020 in Gounod's Roméo et Juliette, and reprised the role of Rodolfo in Puccini's La bohème performed at the Théâtre des Champs-Élysées in June 2023. In an interview with the online magazine Concert Classic, Pati underlined his desire to embody a "less smooth" Rodolfo, adding: "I would like to emphasise that he is an artist, a poet, which is not trivial, and that he does not fall in love with Mimi, on a whim."

Pati started his 2024/25 season with his role debut as Faust in Gounod's Faust at the Paris Opera. He made his house debut with the Royal Opera in December as Rodolfo in La bohème, and his house debut at the Metropolitan Opera in January 2025, performing as the Duke of Mantua in Rigoletto. He also made his house debut at the Bavarian State Opera and Lyric Opera of Chicago, performing Rodolfo, and made his debut at the Salzburg Easter Festival, singing Mendelssohn's Elijah. He also performed the role in San Francisco, as he made a return to that opera house. He made his debut as Werther(title role) in a semi-staged version with the L'orchestre de Chambre de Genève, and performed in recitals and concerts throughout Europe. He performed in the world premiere of Fazıl Say's world-premiere, Mozart ve Mevlana which was also recorded by Warner and released in 2025. In the summer of 2025, he returned to the Festival d'Aix-en-Provence to make his debut as Nadir in Les pêcheurs de perles, conducted by Marc Minkowski, followed by his debut at the Salzburg Festival, performing in Mozart's Mitridate, and his debut at the Arena di Verona, performing the Duke in Rigoletto.

He made his New York recital debut on 24 September 2025 at the Park Avenue Armory accompanied by pianist Ronny Michael Greenberg. New York Times critic Corinna da Fonseca-Wollheim wrote that the concert "showcased his voluptuous lyric tenor and a true chamber musician’s sensitivity to the color and nuances of language".

== Recordings ==
- Pene Pati – self titled debut album, Warner Classics-Erato 2022
- Nessun Dorma – second solo album, Warner Classics-Erato 2024
- Serenata a Napoli, an album of Neapolitan songs, Warner Classics-Erato 2025
- Mozart: Requiem – Say: Mozart ve Mevlana, Mozart's Requiem and a world premiere by Fazil Say, Mozart ve Mevlana, Warner Classics-Erato, 2025

== DVD ==
- Mitridate, re di Ponto, C Major, 2022

== Personal life ==
Pati is married to the soprano Amina Edris. In 2026, they finished a sold-out show in Wellington.

== Awards ==
- Joan Sutherland & Richard Bonynge Foundation Bel Canto Award 2012
- Operalia in 2015, the Audience Prize and Second Prize
- Neue Stimmen in 2015, Second Prize
- International Opera Awards, 2022, Opera Magazine Readers Award (public vote)
- Opus Klassik in 2022, Newcomer of the Year Award
- Te Tumu Toi Laureate in 2025
- Opus Klassik Winner for Solo Recording Singing in 2025
- Chevalier de l'ordre des Arts et des Lettres (2026)
