= Julia Lezhneva =

Russian opera singer

- Юлия Лежнева
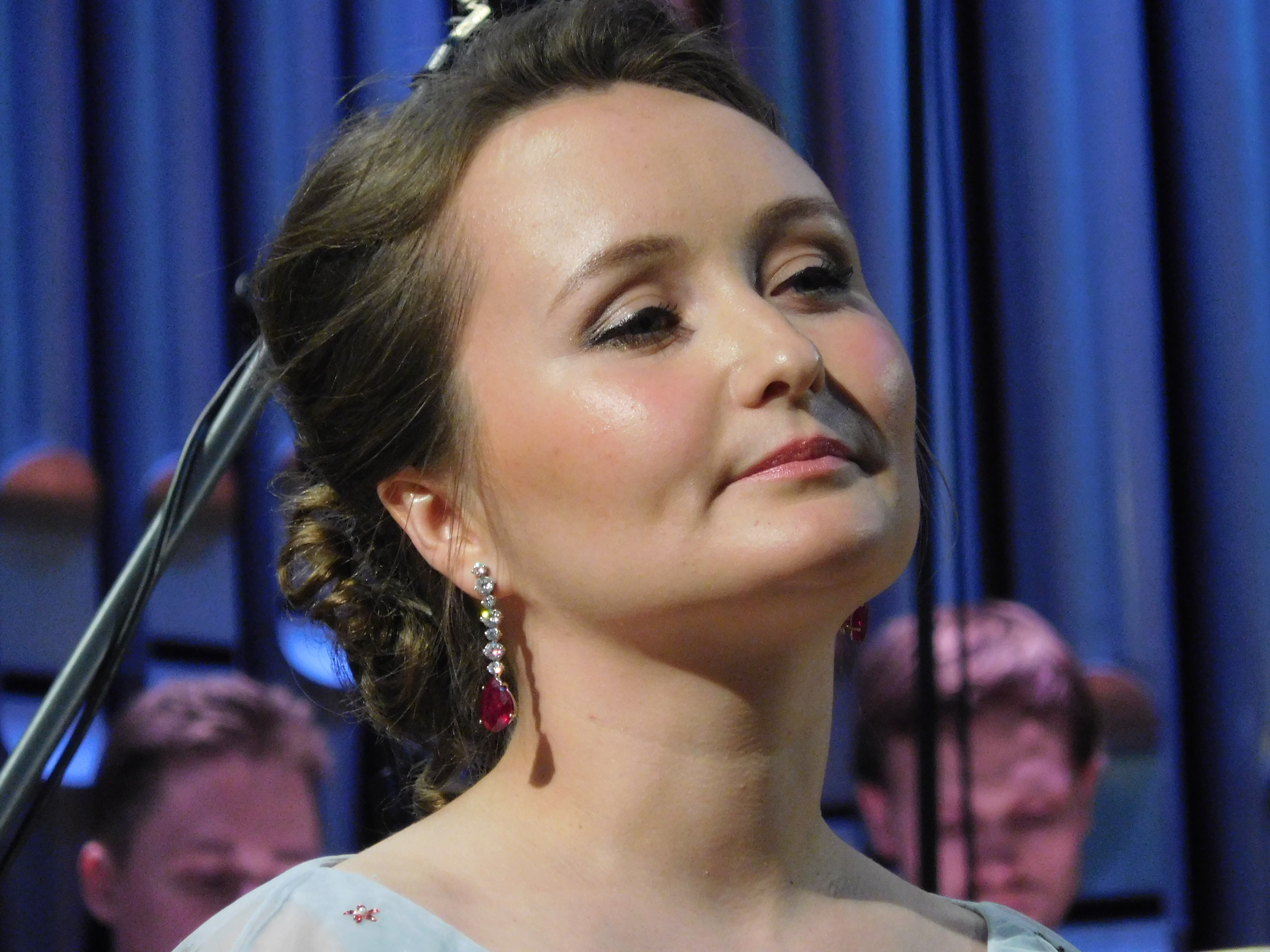
- Lezhneva at Mozart Gala Concert in Moscow, 30 May 2018
- Born: 5 December 1989 (age 36); Yuzhno-Sakhalinsk, Soviet Union
- Occupation: Opera singer (soprano)
- Years active: 2005–present
- Website: julialezhneva.com

Julia Mikhaylovna Lezhneva (Russian: Юлия Михайловна Лежнева; born 5 December 1989) is a Russian operatic soprano and recitalist, specializing in soprano and coloratura mezzo-soprano material of the 18th and early 19th century. She studied with Tamara Cherkasova, Irina Zhurina, Elena Obraztsova, Dennis O'Neill and Yvonne Kenny.

== Early life and education ==
Julia Lezhneva was born in Yuzhno-Sakhalinsk (Sakhalin island), Russia, into a family of geophysicists. In 2004, she graduated with distinction from the Gretchaninov Music School in Moscow. In June 2008, she received an honours degree for her vocal studies and a diploma for piano at the Moscow Conservatory Academic Music College. She pursued her studies from 2008 until summer 2010 at the Cardiff International Academy of Voice under Dennis O'Neill with the support of the Kempinski Arts Support Programme initiated by Marylea Van Daalen. Lezhneva there participated in masterclasses of Richard Bonynge, Carlo Rizzi, Kiri Te Kanawa, Ileana Cotrubaș, and Rebecca Evans. She attended masterclasses with Elena Obraztsova in St. Petersburg in 2007, and with Alberto Zedda at the Accademia Rossiniana in Pesaro in 2008. She also attended masterclasses with Thomas Quasthoff during the 2009 Verbier Festival.

In August 2009 Lezhneva became the youngest winner of the Mirjam Helin International Singing Competition, winning first prize during its sixth competition. Among her other awards is the Russian 'Triumph' award for her contribution to culture and art. She performed in concerts at such international festivals as the Salzburg Mozartwoche Festival (with conductor Marc Minkowski) and Rossini Opera Festival in Pesaro (with conductor Alberto Zedda and tenor Juan Diego Flórez).

== Career ==
=== Season 2009 - 2010: Vivaldi's Ottone; Classical Brits and Salzburg ===
Following her British debut in Liverpool in February 2009, Lezhneva made her London debut on 13 May 2010, at the age of 20, singing Elena's Final Rondo from Rossini's La donna del lago at the Classical Brit Awards at the Royal Albert Hall. Dame Kiri Te Kanawa, recipient of the evening's Lifetime Achievement award, personally introduced her as her protégée. Operatic tenor Dennis O'Neill, director at the Cardiff International Academy of Voice, where Lezhneva has studied since September 2008, said:

We at the International Academy of Voice at Cardiff University are delighted that our President Dame Kiri Te Kanawa has chosen to present Julia as her protégé. It will launch Julia's career on a global level and we are proud that our work here is also being recognised as the institution to have contributed to the advanced preparation and development of this new world-class artist.

=== Season 2010 - 2011: Rossini CD, Tour and Les Huguenots - with Marc Minkowski ===
Naïve released Lezhneva's first solo recording in spring 2011, Rossini arias with Marc Minkowski and Sinfonia Varsovia. The CD won the Diapason d'Or de l'Année "Jeune talent". It was the Gramophone Editor's Choice for July 2011 and the German MDR "CD des Jahres 2011".

Other engagements that season included concert performances of Fiordiligi in Mozart's Così fan tutte with Les Musiciens du Louvre, a debut at La Monnaie as Urbain in a new production of Meyerbeer's Les Huguenots conducted by Minkowski, Stravinsky's Le Rossignol and Tchaikovsky's Iolanta at the Salzburg Festival with Ivor Bolton conducting the Mozarteum Orchestra Salzburg, Mozart's Mass in C Minor under Giovanni Antonini also at the Salzburg Festival, and an American debut in a performances of the Mozart's Requiem with Louis Langrée and the Mostly Mozart Festival Orchestra at the Lincoln Center.

=== Season 2011 - 2012: Tamerlano in Salzburg and Vivaldi's L'Oracolo ===
This season saw Lezhneva's debut with Cleveland Orchestra conducted by Franz Welser-Möst performing the Mozart's Great Mass in C minor. She appeared in concerts throughout Europe. Lezhneva performed Elena's aria from Rossini's La donna del lago during the 2012 Victoires de la musique classique ceremony. She returned to the Salzburg Festival for the third consecutive season, singing the role of Asteria in Handel's Tamerlano at the Großes Festspielhaus with Marc Minkowski conducting Les Musiciens du Louvre.

=== Season 2012 - 2013: Handel's Il Trionfo, Il Barbiere and Alleluia CD ===
The season saw further projects with Il Giardino Armonico – Lezhneva's new Decca solo album Alleluia was released in March 2013 and she performed in numerous solo concerts dedicated to the CD programme throughout Europe. Lezhneva sang the role of Piacere in a concert version of Handel's Il trionfo del Tempo e del Disinganno with René Jacobs conducting the Freiburger Barockorchester in a multi-city European tour. She performed Rosina in Rossini's The Barber of Seville on 14 June 2013, at the Théâtre des Champs-Élysées, conducted Roger Norrington.

=== Season 2013 - 2014: Handel's Alessandro and Pergolesi CD ===
Lezhneva sang the role of Rossane in a concert version Handel's Alessandro with George Petrou conducting the Armonia Atenea on the ensemble's tour to the Bucharest Atheneum, Concertgebouw Amsterdam, Paris Salle Pleyel and Theater an der Wien. She performed a recital with pianist Mikhail Antonenko at the Quincena Festival on 6 August 2013 and continued performing recitals during that season at venues which included St. Petersburg Great Philharmonic Hall, Moscow Pushkin Museum of Fine Arts (December Nights Festival), Vic L'Atlantida, Pamplona Teatro Gayarre, Girona Auditorium. January 2014 saw her performing the soprano solo in Pergolesi's Stabat Mater with I Barocchisti, conducted by Diego Fasolis at the Essen Philharmonie, Festspielhaus Baden-Baden, Concertgebouw in Amsterdam and the KKL.

=== Season 2014 - 2015: Recital at the Bolshoi, Debut at the Royal Opera House and 'Handel' CD ===
Lezhneva started the season with Handel's Alessandro in concert version at the Tchaikovsky Concert Hall. The performance was followed by a recital at the Bolshoi Theatre. In addition to her live performances she recorded Handel, a new solo album with Il Giardino Armonico. The album was released in October 2015 on the Decca label.

=== Season 2015 - 2016: Handel tour and Six Operas ===
Lezhneva's opera performances included Zerlina in Don Giovanni on the Royal Opera House's on Japan tour in September 2015; Laodice in Hasse's Siroe in Kraków, Moscow and Amsterdam in October 2015; Asteria in Handel's Tamerlano at the Amsterdam Concertgebouw and Barbican Hall in November 2015; Almirena in Handel's Rinaldo on a concert tour with Il Pomo d'Oro in February 2016; Desdemona in Rossini's Otello at the Liceu in February 2016 (her house debut); and Fiordiligi in Mozart's Così fan tutte at the Hessisches Staatstheater Wiesbaden in May 2016.

== Discography ==
As of 30 November 2011, Lezhneva is an exclusive DECCA solo artist.

- Bach: Mass in B minor. Label: Naïve Records
- Rossini Arias. Label: Naïve Records
- Vivaldi: Ottone in villa – Verónica Cangemi, Sonia Prina, Julia Lezhneva, Topi Lehtipuu, Roberta Invernizzi; Il Giardino Armonico, Giovanni Antonini (conductor). Label: Naïve Records RV729
- Handel: Alessandro. Label: Decca Classics
- Vivaldi: L'oracolo in Messenia. Label: Virgin Classics
- Alleluia - Vivaldi, Handel, Porpora, Mozart (four motets), with Il Giardino Armonico, Giovanni Antonini Label: Decca Classics
- Stabat Mater (Pergolesi), Laudate pueri, Confitebor tibi domine. duet album with Philippe Jaroussky: Erato/Warner Classics
- Siroe (Hasse). World premiere recording, with Max Emanuel Cenčić and Franco Fagioli, released by Decca Classics.
- G. F. Handel's great early works written during his trip to Italy (La Resurrezione, Il Trionfo del Tempo e del DIsinganno, Dixit Dominus, Salve regina, Apollo e Daphne, Rodrigo, Agrippina), with Il Giardino Armonico / Giovanni Antonini - DECCA Classics, 2015

== Awards ==
- Diapason d'Or de l'Année 'Young Artist': Rossini Arias CD
- Opernwelt 'Young Singer of the Year', 2011 (Urbain, the Page - G. Meyerbeer's 'Les Huguenots')
- Opera of the Year (Opera Awards): ALESSANDRO CD
- Stanley Sadie Handel Recording Prize: ALESSANDRO CD
- Echo Klassik: ALLELUIA CD
- International Classical Music Awards Winner: Pergolesi CD (with Philippe Jaroussky)
- Helpmann Awards (Best Solo Classical Performance of the Year) - Australia, for the performance at the Hobart Baroque Festival

== Further sources ==
- "Julia Lezhneva, la nouvelle Callas". Lefigaro.fr. 3 April 2011.
- Andy Gill. "Album: Julia Lezhneva, Rossini (Naïve)". The Independent.
- Michael Merschmeier. "CD, Julia Lezhneva, Rossini : Der Theaterverlag". Kultiversum.de (in German).
- "Ottone in Villa | Classical review | Music". The Guardian. 2015-11-23.
- Carlin, Francis (2011-06-15). "Les Huguenots, La Monnaie, Brussels". FT.com.
- "Julia Lezhneva | IMG Artists". Archived from the original on 2012-12-31.
- "Keine empfängliche Seele blieb davon unberührt". Archiver.is.
- "Ein Fest der Stimmen - Klassik - Badische Zeitung". Badische-zeitung.de. 2013-01-02.
- "На концерте Юлии Лежневой и оркестра «Il Giardino Armonico". Belcanto.ru. 2012-12-19.<
- ""Il Giardino Armonico" и Юлия Лежнева в Антверпене". Belcanto.ru.
- "Юлия Лежнева на фестивале «Под покровом музыки". Belcanto.ru.
