= Cardiff International =

Cardiff International may refer to:

- Cardiff International Academy of Voice
- Cardiff International Airport, now known as Cardiff Airport
- Cardiff International Arena, an event venue in Cardiff city centre
- Cardiff International Film Festival
- Cardiff International Sports Stadium, a stadium in Leckwith
- Cardiff International Sports Village
  - Cardiff International Pool
  - Cardiff International White Water
