= New Zealand top 50 albums of 2013 =

This is a list of the top-selling albums in New Zealand for 2013 from the Official New Zealand Music Chart's end-of-year chart, compiled by Recorded Music NZ. Twelve of the albums were of New Zealand origin. The top album, Sol3 Mio by Sol3 Mio, was released just five weeks before the chart was compiled.

== Chart ==
Key
‡ – Album of New Zealand origin

Rank	Artist	Title
1	Sol3 Mio	Sol3 Mio^{‡}
2	Lorde	Pure Heroine^{‡}
3	Bruno Mars	Unorthodox Jukebox
4	Pink	The Truth About Love
5	Lorde	The Love Club EP^{‡}
6	Ed Sheeran	+
7	Fat Freddy's Drop	Blackbird^{‡}
8	One Direction	Midnight Memories
9	Fleetwood Mac	25 Years: The Chain Box Set
10	Macklemore and Ryan Lewis	The Heist
11	Michael Bublé	To Be Loved
12	Katy Perry	PRISM
13	Eminem	The Marshall Mathers LP 2
14	Mumford & Sons	Babel
15	Taylor Swift	Red
16	Shapeshifter	Delta^{‡}
17	Adele	21
18	Daft Punk	Random Access Memories
19	Of Monsters and Men	My Head Is an Animal
20	Imagine Dragons	Night Visions
21	Susan Boyle	Home for Christmas
22	fun.	Some Nights
23	Ellie Goulding	Halcyon
24	Michael Buble	Christmas
25	Led Zeppelin	Celebration Day
26	Patsy Riggir	Beautiful Lady: The Very Best of Patsy Riggir^{‡}
27	Les Misérables cast	Les Misérables: Highlights from the Motion Picture Soundtrack
28	One Direction	Take Me Home
29	Charley Pride	40 Years of Pride
30	Rudimental	Home
31	Jackie Thomas	Jackie Thomas
32	Rihanna	Unapologetic
33	Passenger	All the Little Lights
34	Lana Del Rey	Born To Die
35	Fleetwood Mac	Rumours: 35th Anniversary Edition
36	Various	The Great Gatsby: Music from Baz Luhrmann's Film
37	Suzanne Prentice	The Very Best of Suzanne Prentice: 1973 - 2013^{‡}
38	will.i.am	#willpower
39	Justin Timberlake	The 20/20 Experience
40	Six60	Six60^{‡}
41	James Blunt	Moon Landing
42	David Bowie	The Next Day
43	Emeli Sande	Our Version of Events
44	Flume	Flume
45	Bruno Mars	Doo-Wops & Hooligans
46	Birdy	Birdy
47	Stan Walker	The Complete Collection^{‡}
48	Blacklistt	Blacklistt
49	Richard Clayderman	Romantique
50	Stan Walker	Inventing Myself^{‡}
