= Grace (Moses Mackay album) =

2023 album by Moses Mackay

Studio album by Moses Mackay
- Released: 28 April 2023
- Genre: Classical crossover; pop; soul
- Length: 38:45
- Label: Momoose Records
- Producer: Moses Mackay

Singles from Grace
- 1. "Some Sorta Sensation" Released: 31 March 2023; 2. "Embers of Fire" Released: 28 April 2023

Grace is the debut studio album by New Zealand classical crossover musician Moses Mackay of the band Sol3 Mio. The album was released on 28 April 2023, and debuted at number one in New Zealand.

== Production ==
Unlike Mackay's albums with Sol3 Mio, Grace is composed of original songs, written by Mackay himself, who wanted to portray another side of himself to his work with Sol3 Mio. Mackay dedicated the album to his grandmother, who died when he was young. The song "Grace" was written by Mackay when he was 17, in memory of her.

The album was recorded at Furaha Studios in Los Angeles over a period of three months. The album was written without a genre in mind, but incorporates elements of classical crossover and soul.

== Release and promotion ==
In December 2022, Mackay performed a special concert in collaboration with Ludwig Treviranus at the Auckland War Memorial Museum, where he performed material from Grace. The first single from the album was "Some Sorta Sensation", on 31 March 2023, which was promoted with a music video shot in Los Angeles. "Embers of Fire" was released as a single on 28 April, the same day of the album's release.

== Critical reception ==
Corrine Rutherford of muzic.net.nz gave the album five stars, describing it as "an album in which you sit and appreciate the beauty which unfolds", and praising Mackay's vocal abilities.

== Track listing ==
All tracks are written by Moses Mackay.

Grace track listing
No.	Title	Length
1.	"Avon"	4:37
2.	"Rain a Comin'"	3:07
3.	"Some Sorta Sensation"	3:31
4.	"Embers of Fire"	5:25
5.	"Back to You"	3:39
6.	"Scent of a Woman"	4:14
7.	"Maurice the Cleaner"	3:21
8.	"Farewell of an Irishman"	2:00
9.	"Grace"	4:17
10.	"Made My Bed (For You Ma)"	4:40
Total length:		38:46

== Credits and personnel ==
- Moses Mackay – bass (1, 3), engineer, guitar (8), piano (1, 4, 6, 9–10), percussion (7), producer, songwriter, vocals
- Jack Haigh – guitar (5)
- Felipe Milk – drums (2, 5, 7), guitar (2), horn (2, 7)
- Peter Schwier – mastering engineer, mixer
- Damiano Della Torre – keyboards (2–3, 7), piano (2–3, 5, 7)
- Matthias Mackay – Management

== Charts ==
Weekly chart performance for Grace
Chart (2023)	Peak position
New Zealand Albums (RMNZ)	1
