= Opera Barga Festival =

Italian music event

The Opera Barga Festival is an annual opera festival held in July in the town of Barga, Italy, founded in 1967 by Peter Hunt and Gillian Armitage together with Peter Gellhorn as musical director and Lorenzo Malfatti, head of didactics. Its performances take place in the late 18th century theatre, Teatro dei Differenti which seats 289. (Between 1982 and 1998, the theatre was taken over by the town administration and closed for renovations.)

The main artistic aim of the festival is to perform works from the Baroque era - in addition to modern operas - and, since its inception, it has staged more than 40 operas, many being heard for the first time in modern times. The performers are young musicians taking part in the festival's summer school. Past participants have included the Welsh operatic tenor Dennis O'Neill, and the bass-baritone, John Del Carlo.

The Festival is currently run by Nicholas Hunt and Giancarlo Morganti, with the musical counsel of Massimo Fino. In recent years it has produced "Gli equivoci nel sembiante" (1780), Alessandro Scarlatti's first opera, performed also at Castel St. Elmo in Naples and in Lubiana (2012), La Caduta di Gierusalemme (1788) by Giovanni Paolo Colonna, first Italian staged performance in modern times (2013), Il Bajazet by Francesco Gasparini (1719), First ever performance in modern times (2014) - and Handel's pasticcio Catone, a first stage performance following the concert performance in March 2015 in London during the London Handel Festival. These last productions were conducted by Carlo Ipata and performed by his Auser Music Orchestra. The singers were selected via auditions held in Pisa in February/March. In 2015 the performers in the opera also took part in a master class held by Roberta Invernizzi, along with five other singers selected during the auditions who were instead invited to perform in a baroque concert.

The Opera Barga Festival also promotes contemporary music. For the last two years it has hosted the Inaudita Project, a composer workshop held by Francesco Filidei and another composer (2014 - Yann Robin, 2015 - Frank Bedrossian) with the collaboration of ensembles specialising in contemporary performance, in 2014 Contempoartensemble and in 2015 Ensemble Multilaterale, who coproduced the performance and shall commission a work by the winner of this years competition, Emanuele Palumbo. The commission was awarded by a Jury consisting of the two composers, Yann Robin, the artistic director of the Ensemble Multilaterale and the four musicians who performed the works.

The Musica nei Borghi project run by Opera Barga in collaboration with Simone Bernardini and the Ensemble Le Musiche, produces a series of concerts that are performed in various corners of the Councils of Barga and Bagnone featuring famous classical works alongside lesser-known pieces, as a way of gratifying but at the same time stimulating audiences.

Vivaldi's operas play an important role in this festival. In 2005, his unknown opera, Motezuma, was due to have been performed. The score had been discovered in Kyiv, Ukraine, as part of the collection of the Sing-Akademie zu Berlin which had been looted towards the end of World War II. Due to a complex copyright dispute, a German court issued an injunction to prevent the performance, and substitute music from other Vivaldi operas was presented along with the original text.

== See also ==
- List of opera festivals
