= Jerome Grey =

American singer, songwriter, musician, and composer (born 1947)

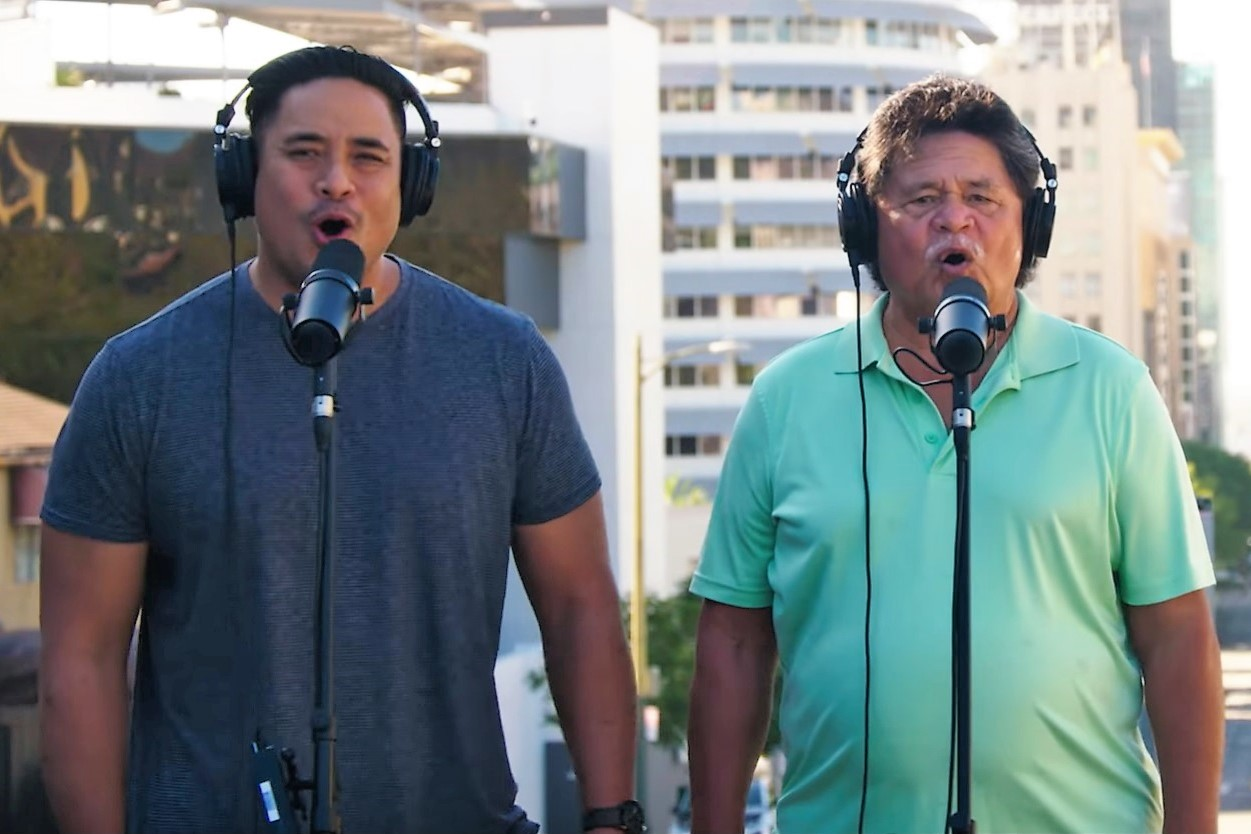
- Tinifu Loa Grey and Jerome Faʻanana Grey (right) sing for the 2020 United States census

Background information
- Born: March 23, 1947 (age 78); Apia, Western Samoa
- Origin: Anaheim, California, US
- Occupations: Singer; songwriter; musician; publisher
- Spouse: Emily
- Website: jeromegreymusic.com/about-jerome

Fa'anana Jerome Grey (born March 23, 1947) is a Samoan-American singer, songwriter, musician, and composer.

== Early life and education ==
Grey was educated at Chanel College in Apia.

== Career ==
Jerome Grey is a Samoan musician based in California. His song "We Are Samoa" was popular and became an unofficial anthem for the country.

Among the musicians he has worked with are Seminary Uesele and Harry Sinapi, collectively known as the Samoan Three.

He released recordings on New Zealand-based Hibiscus Records. His first single was "Olaga O Samoa". The Samoa Three, the group he started in 1971 was a popular trio who played contemporary, oldies and ballads including covers of Frank Sinatra, Tony Bennett, Nat King Cole and Sammy Davis. They were best known for their versatility in cultural songs, from Spanish to Latin, Hawaiian, Tahitian and Fijian.

With Aleki Fuimaono and Harry Miller as the Ava Band, the Ava LP was released in 1979 on Bluewater Records, produced by Frank Day and executive producer Tom Moffatt. The LP We Are Samoa followed in 1980, recorded in Hawaii and in Hollywood at Conway Records.

In 1973, he was awarded the matai title of Fepuleai.

In January 2007, Grey suffered a mild stroke while working at Mai Tai in Long Beach, California. After four months he was back to work, slowly improving.

In August 2021, he was named as "Polynesia's Artist of the Decade" by the Asia Pacific Cultural Center in Tacoma, Washington. In July 2022, the Pacific Music Awards announced that he would receive their 2022 lifetime achievement award.

== Personal life ==
His eldest son, Tinifu Loa Grey, is a singer, songwriter, and musician. His youngest son, Taumata, is a songwriter and lead guitarist for Common Kings. His daughter, Sisa Grey, is an actress.

== Discography ==
=== Albums ===
- We Are Samoa – Jerome Grey Productions / Reminisce Music Publishing (1980)
- Footprints (compact disc)
- Coconut Woman – Jerome Grey Productions / Reminisce Music Publishing (1989)

=== Extended plays ===
- Jerome Grey at the Intercontinental, Songs of Samoa – Hisbiscus Records HE.6

=== The Ava Band ===
- Ava – Bluewater Records SLP 633 (1979)
- We Are Samoa – Bluewater Records SLP 733 (1980)
