= On Another Note =

Studio album by Sol3 Mio
- Released: 9 October 2015
- Recorded: Abbey Road Studios, London
- Genre: Operatic pop
- Label: Universal

Sol3 Mio chronology
Sol3 Mio (2013)	On Another Note (2015)	A Very MΞRRY Christmas (2017)

On Another Note is the second studio album by New Zealand musical trio Sol3 Mio. It was released on 9 October 2015 by Universal Music Group. The album debuted at number 1 on the New Zealand Albums Chart.

== Track listing ==
1. "Stella"
2. "Mamma"
3. "That's Amore"
4. "L'Alba Separa Dalla Luce L'Ombra"
5. "I See Fire"
6. "Shenandoah"
7. "Santa Lucia"
8. "Che Gelida Manina (From La Bohème)"
9. "Jamaica Farewell"
10. "Edelweiss"
11. "Marechiare"
12. "Volare"
13. "Delilah"
14. "Jerusalem"
15. "Fix You" (Bonus Track)
16. "Dance with My Father" (Bonus Track)

== Charts and certifications ==
=== Weekly charts ===
Chart (2015/16)	Peak position
Australian Albums (ARIA)	45
New Zealand Albums (RMNZ)	1

=== Year-end charts ===
Chart (2015)	Position
New Zealand Albums (RMNZ)	6

Chart (2016)	Position
New Zealand Albums (RMNZ)	6

=== Certifications ===
Region	Certification	Certified units/sales
New Zealand (RMNZ)	2× Platinum	30,000^{^}
^{^} Shipments figures based on certification alone.

== See also ==
- New Zealand top 50 albums of 2015
- List of number-one albums from the 2010s (New Zealand)
