= Wales Academy of Voice and Dramatic Arts =

Coordinates: 51.505°N 3.166°W

Logo of the Wales International Academy of Voice

The Wales International Academy of Voice (Welsh: Academi Llais Ryngwladol Cymru) was established by its founder, the Welsh tenor Dennis O'Neill CBE, to provide advanced voice, music and drama coaching to young professional opera singers from all over the world in the early stages of their careers. It was opened in 2007 as the Cardiff International Academy of Voice and was funded by Cardiff University. Following Cardiff University's withdrawal of funding in 2010, the University of Wales Trinity Saint David took over the partnership in June 2011 under the new name of the Wales International Academy of Voice.

== History ==
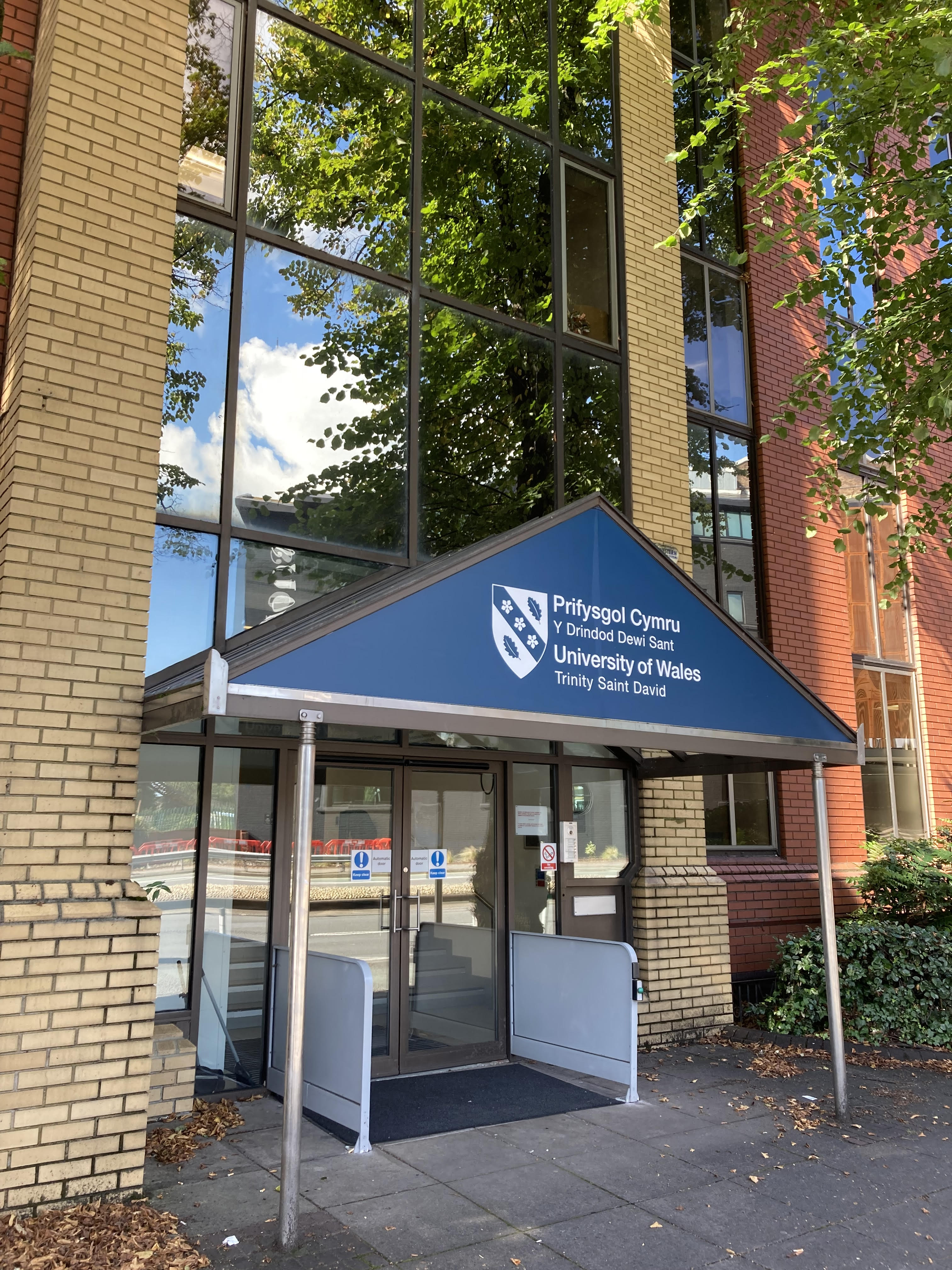
Wales Academy of Voice and Dramatic Arts in Cardiff

The Academy opened in January 2007 with its first intake of students on year-long courses which began in the Autumn of each year from 2008 to 2009. The courses involved 30 weeks of instruction via individual coaching and master classes as well as student participation in the Opera Barga and Wexford festivals. All vocal recitals by the Academy's students and many of its master classes have been open to the public. The Academy's many notable visiting instructors have included Carlo Rizzi, Antonio Pappano, Richard Bonynge, Della Jones, Rebecca Evans, Ileana Cotrubas, Dame Anne Evans and Sir Jonathan Miller.

In May 2010 Cardiff University announced that the Academy would close because of a lack of funds.

In May 2011 Trinity Dewi Sant announced that the Academy would be re-launched in June 2011 under the name of Wales International Academy of Voice.

== Notable alumni ==
- Julia Lezhneva, soprano
- Mary-Jean O'Doherty, soprano

== See also ==
- Royal Welsh College of Music & Drama
- Cardiff University School of Music
- Welsh Singers Competition
- Cardiff Singer of the World
