= Sol3 Mio =

New Zealand musical trio

SOLΞ MIO
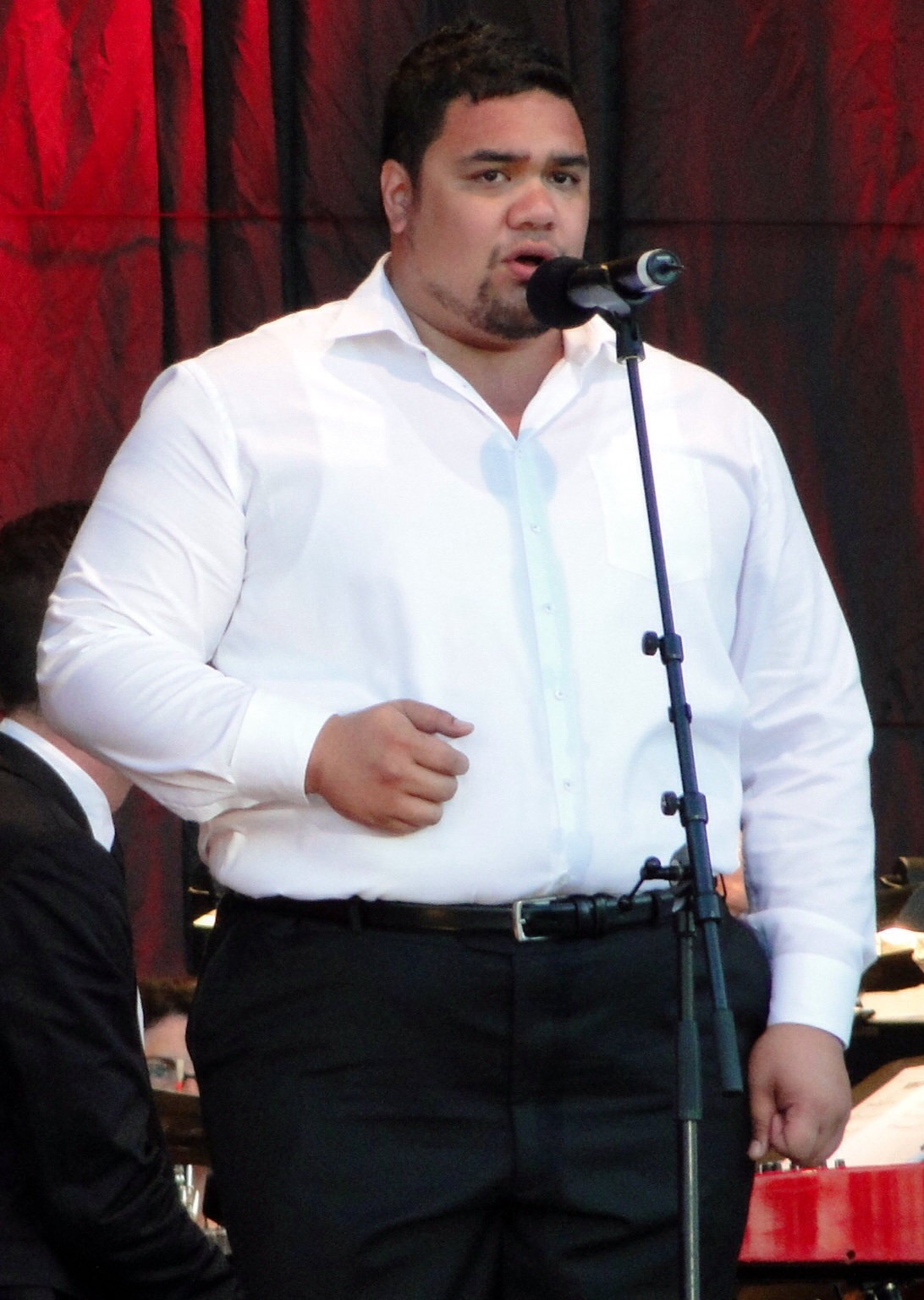
- Pene Pati

Background information
- Origin: Auckland, New Zealand
- Genre: Operatic pop
- Years active: 2012–present
- Label: Universal Music
- Members: Moses Mackay; Pene Pati; Amitai Pati
- Website: sol3mio.com

SOL3 MIO (stylised as SOLΞ MIO) is a New Zealand musical trio consisting of Moses Mackay, Pene Pati and Amitai Pati. Of Samoan descent and classically trained, Moses is a baritone, and the Pati brothers are operatic tenors.

== Albums and tours ==
The group's self-titled debut album, featuring an operatic take on a range of traditional and popular songs, was the highest selling album in New Zealand in 2014 and 2015, and the second in 2016. The album is certified 8× platinum and won the named award twice in a row at the annual New Zealand Music Awards.

In 2015 the group released a cover of Ed Sheeran's The Hobbit soundtrack song "I See Fire" in support of New Zealand's participation in the 2015 Rugby World Cup. The group's second album, On Another Note, was released in October 2015 and is certified 3× platinum. At the NZ VMA's, the album won the highest selling album of 2016, being the third year in a row the group won the award.

In November 2017, the group released a Christmas album titled A Very MΞRRY Christmas featuring covers of a number of classic Christmas songs as well as two original pieces written and produced by Moses. The album is certified Gold and was their third consecutive album to debut at the top of the music charts.

Their annual tours, Christmas in the Vines, sees the group perform at wineries across the country. In more recent years, the success of these tours has seen it being extended past Christmas, subsequently having the name altered to 'Summer at the Beach', and 'Summer in the Park'. Every year the group announces a new charity they are sponsoring while continuing working with them in NZ and internationally. Among the charities they have sponsored have been the Dream Chaser Foundation, The Fred Hollows Foundation, and the Red Cross.

== History ==
Before the group was formed, 2008 saw Moses, 18, and Pene, 20, providing the backing vocals for the tour of Andrea Bocelli. In 2010 Moses, 20, and Amitai, 21, were among five that sung the backing vocals for George Benson's An Unforgettable Tribute to Nat King Cole tour.

After individually being hand picked by Dennis O’Neill to further their music studies at the Wales International Academy of Voice, the forming of the group was an idea thought of by the three in an attempt to fundraise the hundred and thousands of dollars they would need for all three of them to move to the UK indefinitely and afford the master's degree. In 2012, together with their families, they hired a school hall and performed to a half full audience. A few short months later saw them perform their first sold-out headlining show at Auckland Town Hall and they were signed to Universal Music the following day.

In 2015 they were named Top Group of the Year by the Variety Artists Club of New Zealand, and again in 2016 at the Pacific Music Awards. In 2017 Moses played DJ Otis in Robert Tapert's Pleasuredome starring alongside actress Lucy Lawless. During this time, Pene and Amitai were working closely with the San Francisco Opera also starring in lead roles.

== Personal life ==
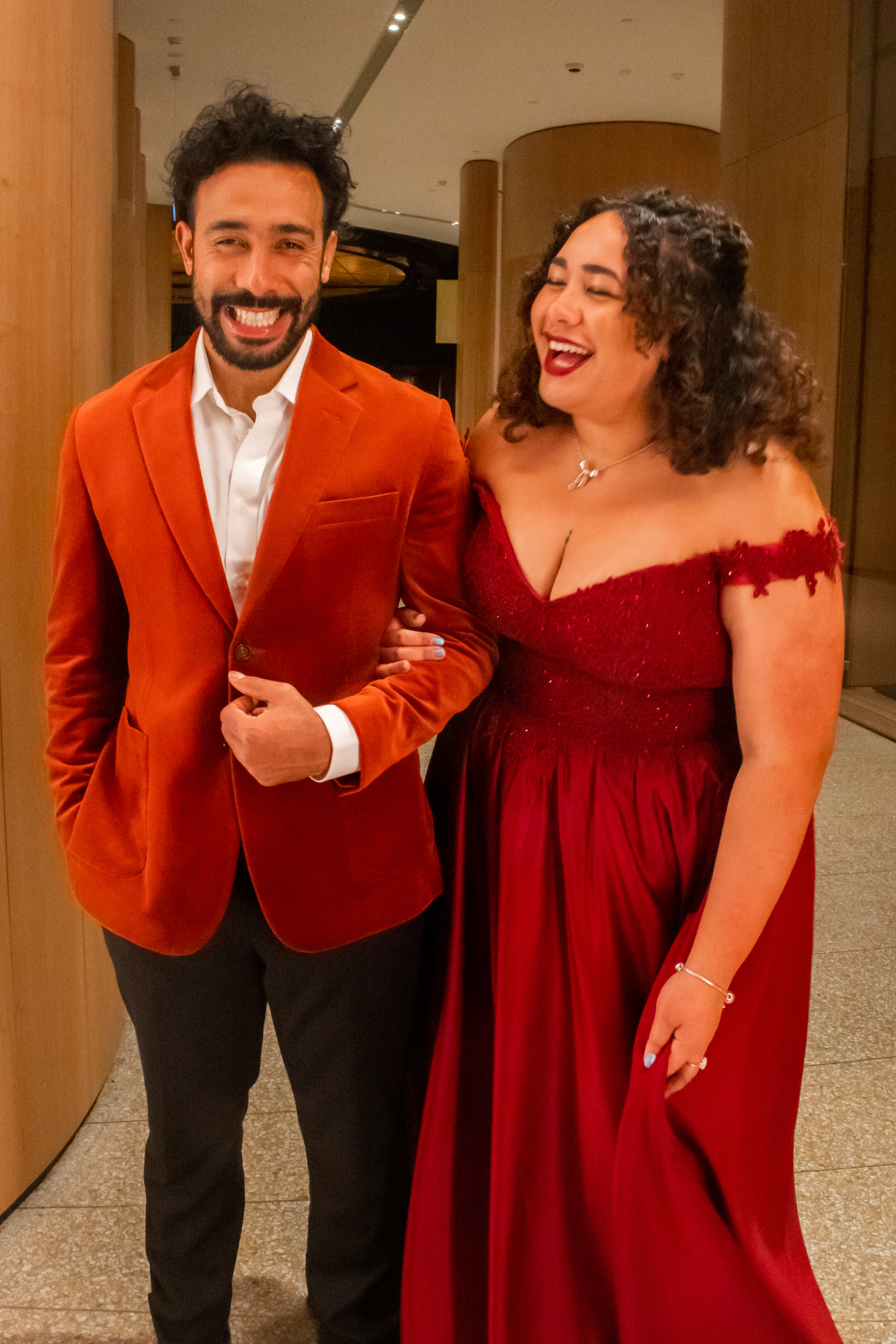
Moses Mackay and his sister, Anasetasia

Pene and Amitai Pati are brothers, and have a distant family connection with Moses Mackay. The three discovered their family connections coincidentally, being involved with music groups whilst they were all studying at the University of Auckland.

Moses Mackay attended Rosmini College on Auckland's North Shore, graduating in 2007. Moses was a keen sportsman and musician in college, and following his older brother being Head Boy in 2004, Moses was also Head Boy in his final year. Moses is one of four, with an older brother Marley, and younger brother and sister Matthias and Anasetasia. Moses' main residence is in his hometown but frequently travels around the world.

Pene and Amitai Pati both attended Aorere College in Manukau, South Auckland. Pene graduated in 2005, and Amitai in 2007. Pene and Amitai are two of four, having an older sister Torres, and a sister in between the two, Fa'anenefu. Their main residence is in San Francisco, US. In January 2016 Pene Pati married Egyptian-born singer Amina Edris at a private ceremony at Villa Maria after proposing to her, at the same winery, on stage at the group's annual Christmas in the Vines tour in December 2014.

== Discography ==
=== Studio albums ===
Title	Album details	Peak chart positions			Certifications
Title	Album details	NZ	AUS	UK	Certifications
SOLΞ MIO	Released: 15 November 2013; Label: Universal Music Group; Formats: CD, digital download	1	6	44	RMNZ: 8× Platinum
On Another Note	Released: 9 October 2015; Label: Universal Music Group; Formats: CD, digital download	1	45	—	RMNZ: 3× Platinum
A Very MΞRRY Christmas	Released: 10 November 2017; Label: Universal Music Group; Formats: CD, digital download	1	—	—	RMNZ: Platinum
Coming Home	Released: 12 November 2021; Label: Universal Music Group; Formats: CD, digital download	2	—	—	—
Pene Pati (solo album)	Released: 25 March 2022; Label: Warner Classics; Formats: CD, digital download	—	—	—	—
Grace (Moses Mackay solo album)	Released: 28 April 2023; Label: Momoose Records; Formats: CD, digital download	1	—	—	—

== See also ==
- List of number-one albums from the 2010s (New Zealand)
- New Zealand top 50 albums of 2013
