= Dennis Marsh =

New Zealand singer

Dennis Marsh MNZM
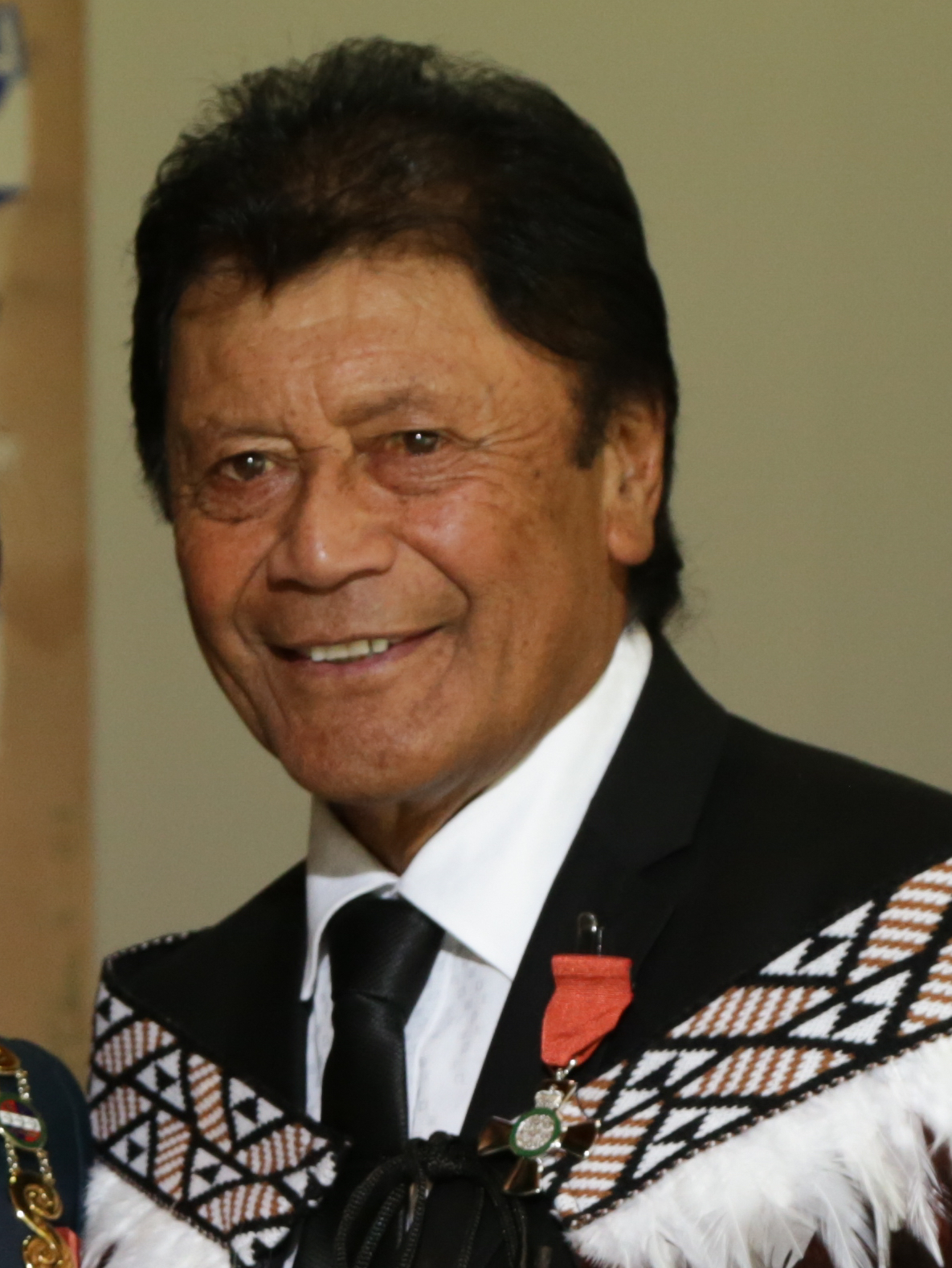
- Marsh in 2020

Background information
- Born: 22 February 1951 (age 75); Te Kūiti, New Zealand
- Origin: Auckland, New Zealand
- Genres: Country, gospel
- Occupations: Singer, guitarist, television presenter
- Instrument: Guitar
- Years active: 1984–present
- Website: Dennis Marsh

Dennis Te Uhi Marsh MNZM (born 22 February 1951) is a New Zealand country music singer and television presenter, best known for his series of popular albums in the 2010s and for hosting the country music TV show My Country Song. He is New Zealand's best selling country music artist.

== Background ==
Marsh was born in Te Kūiti, New Zealand in 1951 and has Ngāpuhi and Ngati Hine iwi affiliations. He moved to Auckland to pursue a career as a carpenter, but became involved with Christian music, studied theology and lead a youth ministry. In 1984 Marsh became involved with country music and began performing around New Zealand. He won a number of local awards, and eventually release his debut album, For You, in 1989.

Marsh has since released 29 albums, including two which reached No. 1 on the New Zealand albums chart, four gold albums and six platinum albums. He has won numerous country music awards, including being honoured as the 2011 Country Music Legend at the National Country Music Awards, and inducted into the Golden Guitar Awards Hands of Fame, also in 2011.

In 2013, Marsh hosted the Māori Television country music showcase series My Country Song. This was followed by a compilation album, The Best of My Country Song and a live album, My Country Song – The Showcase Concert, both of which featured songs from Marsh.

In October 2019, Marsh received the Benny Award from the Variety Artists Club of New Zealand, the highest honour for a NZ entertainer. In the 2020 New Year Honours, Marsh was appointed a Member of the New Zealand Order of Merit, for services to music and fundraising.

== Discography ==
=== Albums ===
Year	Title	Peak chart positions	Certification
Year	Title	NZ	Certification
1989	For You	—	
1990	Your Choice	—	
1991	Hobo (in a Silk Shirt)	—	
1991	Lucky Star	—	
1992	Feelings	—	
1993	Dad	—	
1994	Out of Mexico	—	
1996	Out of Nashville	—	
1997	Faith	—	
1998	Faded Love	—	
2000	Out of New Zealand	23	
2001	Christmas in New Zealand	—	
2002	To Get To You	—	
2003	Live in Concert	—	
2004	Memories of New Zealand	—	
2005	Dennis Marsh	—	
2006	Tequila Sunrise	—	
2007	Walking Through My Mind	—	
2008	Land of the Long White Cloud	—	
2008	Don't Take it to Heart	—	
2009	Legend in My Time	—	
2011	Maori Songbook	1	RMNZ: Platinum
2011	Through the Years: The Very Best of Dennis Marsh	13	RMNZ: Gold
2012	Sounds of the Pacific	6	RMNZ: Gold
2013	Country Songbook	1	
2013	Christmas from the Heart	13	
2015	Lest We Forget	1	RMNZ: Gold
2015	Maori Songbook 2	9	
2017	I Believe	4	
2018	Backyard Party	2	RMNZ: Gold
"—" denotes a recording that did not chart or was not released in that territory.

== Awards ==
Year	Nominee / work	Award	Result
1997	Dennis Marsh – Out of Nashville	New Zealand Music Awards – Best Country Album	Nominated
1998	Dennis Marsh – Faith	New Zealand Music Awards – Best Gospel Album	Nominated
2002	Dennis Marsh – Faded Love	New Zealand Music Awards – Best Country Album	Nominated
2007	Dennis Marsh	National Country Music Awards – Best Selling Country Music Album of the Year	Won
2007	Dennis Marsh	Australian Country Recording Awards – Overseas Artist Award	Won
2008	Dennis Marsh	National Country Music Awards – Country Music Male Artist of the Year	Won
2009	Dennis Marsh	National Country Music Awards – Country Music Male Artist of the Year	Won
2009	Dennis Marsh	Top Male Vocalist – Variety Artists Club of New Zealand Awards	Won
2011	Dennis Marsh	National Country Music Awards – Country Music Legend	Won
2011	Dennis Marsh	Golden Guitar Awards – Hands of Fame	Won
2013	Dennis Marsh	National Country Music Awards – Country Music Male Artist of the Year	Won
2016	Dennis Marsh - Maori Songbook 2	New Zealand Music Awards – Best Maori Album	Nominated
2019	Dennis Marsh	Benny Award Variety Artists Club of New Zealand	Won
