= Dennis O'Neill (tenor) =

Welsh opera singer (born 1948)

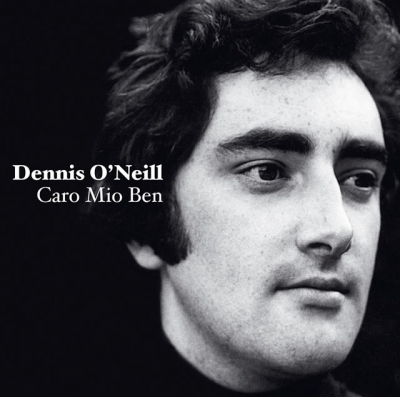
Album cover of Caro Mio Ben (1986)

O'Neill singing Caro Mio Ben (attributed to Tommaso Giordani), recorded in 1986

Dennis O'Neill CBE OStJ FLSW FTCL ARCM (born 25 February 1948) is a Welsh operatic tenor and recording artist.

== Early life ==
Dennis O'Neill was born in Pontarddulais, to Welsh and Irish parents. He studied privately with Professor Frederic Cox (Principal of the Royal Northern College of Music) in Manchester and then in London. At the age of 19 he spent the summer as an apprentice singer at the Opera Barga Festival in Tuscany, which confirmed his ambition to become an opera singer. Later, after a Royal Society of Arts award, he returned to Italy to study with Ettore Campogalliani in Mantua and Luigi Ricci in Rome.

== Career ==
In his time, Dennis O'Neill has been connected with the Royal Opera House, Covent Garden, London and the Welsh National Opera, Cardiff, Wales. He has given regular guest performances at the Metropolitan Opera New York, in Chicago, San Francisco, Zurich, Paris, Brussels, Vienna, Verona, Munich and Australia.

In the opera world, O'Neill is perhaps best known as a Verdi exponent. He performs song recitals and oratorios, especially the tenor part of the Verdi Requiem. In 2005 he was awarded the Verdi Medal by the Amici di Verdi. O'Neill is committed to the education of younger opera singers, and in Spring 2007 he became the director of the Cardiff International Academy of Voice.

O'Neill's recording career includes many solo albums and operas. He has performed on video film with Kiri te Kanawa and the conductor Georg Solti.

A generation before his fellow-Welshman Bryn Terfel, O'Neill was a regular face on British TV. He has presented two TV shows, Dennis O'Neill (1987) and Dennis O'Neill and Friends (1989), amongst other TV performances, such as the title role in Faust and Alfred in Die Fledermaus.

In 2006 O'Neill performed as Eleazar in La Juive (The Jewess) in a Royal Opera concert in the Barbican concert hall, London. It was his 43rd visit to the Royal Opera House. In 2000 he was appointed a CBE.

In 2014, O'Neill was elected a Fellow of the Learned Society of Wales.
