= Sol3 Mio (album) =

Studio album by Sol3 Mio
- Released: November 15, 2013
- Recorded: London, 2013
- Genre: Operatic pop
- Label: Universal
- Producer: Nick Patrick

Sol3 Mio chronology
Sol3 Mio (2013)	On Another Note (2015)

Sol3 Mio (stylised as SOLΞ MIO) is the self-titled debut studio album by New Zealand musical trio Sol3 Mio. It was released on 15 November 2013 by Universal Music Group. The album debuted at number 1 on the New Zealand Albums Chart, and as of 7 July 2014, has spent sixteen non-consecutive weeks at number 1. It has since been certified 8× platinum by Recorded Music NZ for shipments exceeding 120,000 copies.

== Background ==
Sol3 Mio was recorded in London in 2013. It was produced by Nick Patrick and consists of 14 covers of opera, musical and popular classics, including two Christmas songs. The album was released on 15 November 2013 and has been certified 8× platinum by Recorded Music NZ for shipments exceeding 120,000 copies. Despite being released at the end of 2013, the album sold so well that it became the best-selling album of the year in New Zealand, beating out fellow New Zealand singer Lorde's Pure Heroine. The album also went on to become the second best-selling album of the year for 2014 in New Zealand, behind Ed Sheeran's x. In Australia, the album peaked at number 6 on the ARIA Albums Chart in 2014. In the UK, it peaked at number 44 on the UK Albums Chart.

== Track listing ==
No.	Title	Lyrics	Music	Length
1.	"'O sole mio"	Giovanni Capurro	Eduardo di Capua	2:47
2.	"The Rose"	Amanda McBroom	Amanda McBroom	3:52
3.	"My Way"	Paul Anka	Claude François, Jacques Revaux	2:58
4.	"Ten Guitars"	Gordon Mills	Gordon Mills	2:59
5.	"Maria"	Stephen Sondheim	Leonard Bernstein	2:59
6.	"Bring Him Home"	Alain Boublil	Claude-Michel Schönberg	3:38
7.	"Tell My Father"	Jack Murphy	Frank Wildhorn	4:06
8.	"Yellow Bird"	Alan and Marilyn Bergman	Norman Luboff	2:42
9.	"Songbird"	Christine McVie	Christine McVie	3:11
10.	"Au fond du temple saint (The Pearl Fishers' Duet)"	Eugène Cormon, Michel Carré	Georges Bizet	5:19
11.	"Nessun Dorma"	Giuseppe Adami, Renato Simoni	Giacomo Puccini	2:48
12.	"We Are Samoa"	Jerome Grey	Jerome Grey	3:31

== Charts and certifications ==
=== Weekly charts ===
Chart (2013–14)	Peak position
Australian Albums (ARIA)	6
New Zealand Albums (RMNZ)	1
UK Albums (Official Charts)	44

=== Year-end charts ===
Chart (2013)	Position
New Zealand Albums (RMNZ)	1

Chart (2014)	Position
New Zealand Albums (RMNZ)	2

Chart (2015)	Position
New Zealand Albums (RMNZ)	14

Chart (2016)	Position
New Zealand Albums (RMNZ)	35

=== Certifications ===
Region	Certification	Certified units/sales
New Zealand (RMNZ)	8× Platinum	120,000^{^}
^{^} Shipments figures based on certification alone.
