= The All-American Rejects discography =

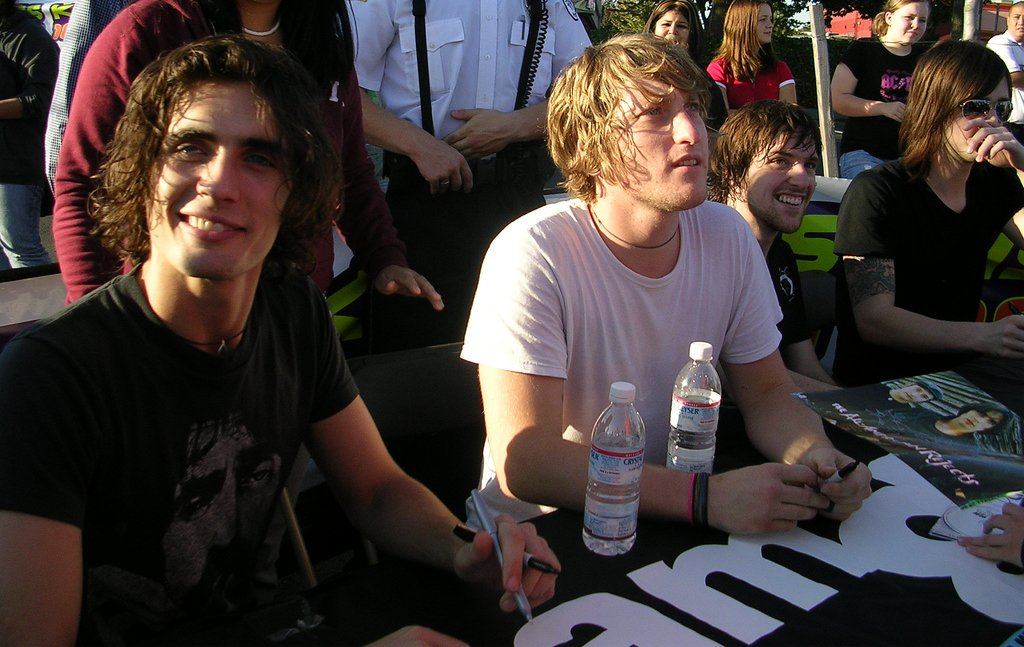
- The band in 2005
- Studio albums: 5
- Extended plays: 7
- Singles: 22
- Video albums: 4
- Music videos: 21

American rock band the All-American Rejects have released five studio albums, 22 singles, 21 music videos, 4 video albums, and 7 extended plays.

The All-American Rejects formed in 1999, releasing their debut self-titled album through Doghouse Records in October 2002. The album was later reissued by DreamWorks Records in 2003, along with their first single "Swing, Swing". The All-American Rejects was certified platinum by the RIAA after reaching number nine on Billboard's Top Independent Albums chart and number 25 on the Billboard 200. "Swing, Swing" peaked at No. 60 on the Billboard Hot 100, No. 8 on the Hot Modern Rock Tracks chart, and No. 13 in the United Kingdom Singles chart.

In 2005, the All-American Rejects released their second album, Move Along, which placed at number six on the Billboard 200. The album was certified two times platinum by the RIAA, featuring three successful singles: "Dirty Little Secret", "Move Along", and "It Ends Tonight". The singles all peaked in the top 15 of the Billboard Hot 100 and Pop 100 charts, with "Dirty Little Secret" receiving a triple platinum certification from the RIAA.

In 2008, the All-American Rejects released "Gives You Hell", bringing their best chart performance in the Billboard Hot 100 and now defunct-Pop 100, at number four and two respectively. Later in 2008, the band released their third album, When the World Comes Down, which debuted at number 15 on the Billboard 200 and was later certified RIAA gold. Both the single and album experienced success in Australia and New Zealand in February 2009, with "Gives You Hell" peaking at No. 3 on the ARIA Singles Chart and When the World Comes Down peaking at No. 19 on the RIANZ Albums Chart. Another single, "I Wanna", was also a hit in Australia and was certified Gold by the ARIA.

The band's fourth studio album, Kids in the Street, was released March 26, 2012, with its lead single, "Beekeeper's Daughter", peaking at No. 24 on the Bubbling Under Hot 100 Singles chart. Two further singles followed—"Kids in the Street" and "Heartbeat Slowing Down"—but both failed to chart. Their 2017 single, "Sweat", became the group's first entry on the Hot Rock Songs chart. The band is set to release their fifth album, Sandbox, on May 15, 2026.

== Studio albums ==
List of studio albums, with selected chart positions and certifications
Title	Album details	Peak chart positions										Sales	Certifications (sales thresholds)
Title	Album details	US	AUS	AUT	CAN	GER	IRL	JPN	NZ	SCO	UK	Sales	Certifications (sales thresholds)
The All-American Rejects	Released: October 15, 2002; Re-released: February 4, 2003; Label: Doghouse, DreamWorks (re-release); Formats: CD, CS, DL, LP	25	—	—	—	—	—	86	—	44	50	US: 1,010,000	RIAA: Platinum; BPI: Silver; MC: Platinum
Move Along	Released: July 12, 2005; Label: Interscope; Formats: CD, CS, DL, LP	6	—	—	3	—	—	204	31	39	45	US: 2,000,000	RIAA: 3× Platinum; BPI: Gold; MC: Platinum; RMNZ: Gold
When the World Comes Down	Released: December 16, 2008; Label: DGC, Interscope; Formats: CD, DL, LP	15	35	39	3	35	81	100	19	53	48	US: 422,000	RIAA: Platinum; BPI: Silver; RMNZ: Gold
Kids in the Street	Released: March 26, 2012; Label: DGC, Interscope; Formats: CD, DL, LP	18	65	—	—	—	87	120	—	34	34		
Sandbox	Released: May 15, 2026; Label: Slick Shoes; Formats: CD, DL, LP	—	—	—	—	—	—	—	—	—	—		
"—" denotes releases that did not chart or were not released in that territory.

== Extended plays ==
List of extended plays with release details
Title	EP details
The Blue Album^{†}	Released: 2000; Label: Self-released; Formats: CD
Same Girl, New Songs	Released: 2001; Label: Self-released; Formats: CD
The Bite Back EP	Released: December 13, 2005; Label: Interscope; Formats: DL
Gives You Hell: The Remixes	Released: February 3, 2009; Label: DGC, Interscope; Formats: DL
The Wind Blows: The Remixes	Released: June 2, 2009; Label: DGC, Interscope; Formats: DL
I Wanna: The Remixes	Released: August 11, 2009; Label: DGC, Interscope; Formats: DL
Flatline EP	Released: November 13, 2012; Label: DGC, Interscope; Formats: DL
Send Her to Heaven	Released: July 16, 2019; Label: Epitaph; Formats: Vinyl, DL

Notes: ^{†} Does not have an official name.

== Singles ==
List of singles, with selected chart positions and certifications, showing year released and album name
Title	Year	Peak chart positions										Certifications	Album
Title	Year	US	US Pop	AUS	AUT	CAN	GER	IRL	NZ	SCO	UK	Certifications	Album
"Swing, Swing"	2002	60	17	— (Note: "Swing, Swing" did not enter the Australian ARIA Albums Chart but peaked at number 16 on the ARIA Hitseekers Chart.)	—	—	—	—	—	10	13	BPI: Silver	The All-American Rejects
"The Last Song"	2003	—	—	—	—	—	—	—	—	71	69		The All-American Rejects
"Time Stands Still"	2003	—	—	—	—	—	—	—	—	—	—		The All-American Rejects
"Dirty Little Secret"	2005	9	4	73	—	—	—	47	—	13	18	RIAA: 6× Platinum; BPI: Platinum; RMNZ: 2× Platinum	Move Along
"Move Along"	2006	15	9	73	—	7	—	—	—	39	42	BPI: Silver; RMNZ: Platinum	Move Along
"It Ends Tonight"	2006	8	8	52	—	39	—	—	39	42	66		Move Along
"Gives You Hell"	2008	4	1	3	7	4	15	16	18	9	18	RIAA: Diamond; ARIA: Platinum; BPI: Platinum; RMNZ: 3× Platinum	When the World Comes Down
"The Wind Blows"	2009	— (Note: "The Wind Blows" did not enter the Billboard Hot 100, but peaked at number 13 on the Bubbling Under Hot 100 Singles extension chart.)	34	—	—	—	—	—	—	—	—		When the World Comes Down
"I Wanna"	2009	92	28	15	42	—	45	—	—	84	84	ARIA: Gold	When the World Comes Down
"Beekeeper's Daughter"	2012	— (Note: "Beekeeper's Daughter" did not enter the Billboard Hot 100, but peaked at number 24 on the Bubbling Under Hot 100 Singles extension chart.)	38	—	—	—	—	—	—	96	132		Kids in the Street
"Kids in the Street"	2012	—	—	—	—	—	—	—	—	—	—		Kids in the Street
"Heartbeat Slowing Down"	2012	—	— (Note: "Heartbeat Slowing Down" did not enter the Pop Airplay chart, but peaked at number 39 on the Adult Pop Airplay chart.)	—	—	—	—	—	—	—	—		Kids in the Street
"There's a Place"	2015	—	—	—	—	—	—	—	—	—	—		Non-album singles
"Sweat"	2017	—	— (Note: "Sweat" did not enter the Pop Airplay chart, but peaked at number 29 on the Adult Pop Airplay chart.)	—	—	—	—	—	—	—	—		Non-album singles
"Send Her to Heaven"	2019	—	—	—	—	—	—	—	—	—	—		Send Her to Heaven
"Me vs. the World"	2020	—	—	—	—	—	—	—	—	—	—		Non-album singles
"Flagpole Sitta"	2024	—	—	—	—	—	—	—	—	—	—		Non-album singles
"Sandbox"	2025	—	—	—	—	—	—	—	—	—	—		Sandbox
"Easy Come, Easy Go"	2025	—	— (Note: "Easy Come, Easy Go" did not enter the Mainstream Top 40, but peaked at number 17 on the Alternative Airplay chart.)	—	—	—	—	—	—	—	—		Sandbox
"Search Party!"	2025	—	—	—	—	—	—	—	—	—	—		Sandbox
"Eggshell Tap Dancer"	2025	—	—	—	—	—	—	—	—	—	—		Sandbox
"Get This"	2025	—	— (Note: "Easy Come, Easy Go" did not enter the Mainstream Top 40, but peaked at number 19 on the Alternative Airplay chart.)	—	—	—	—	—	—	—	—		Sandbox
"King Kong"	2026	—	—	—	—	—	—	—	—	—	—		Sandbox
"I've Been Everywhere"	2026	—	—	—	—	—	—	—	—	—	—		Non-album single
"—" denotes a title that was not released or did not chart in that territory.

=== Promotional singles ===
Title	Year	Peak chart positions	Album
Title	Year	US Rock DL	Album
"My Paper Heart" (Note: Promotional discs of "My Paper Heart", "Top of the World" and "Real World" were sent only to modern rock stations in the United States.)	2003	—	The All-American Rejects
"Top of the World"	2006	—	Move Along
"Mona Lisa (When the World Comes Down)" (Note: "Mona Lisa (When the World Comes Down)", "Someday's Gone", and "Walk Over Me" were released as digital singles prior to the release of their respective albums.)	2008	—	When the World Comes Down
"Real World"	2009	—	When the World Comes Down
"Someday's Gone"	2012	49	Kids in the Street
"Walk Over Me"	2012	—	Kids in the Street
"—" denotes a title that was not released or did not chart in that territory.

== Videography ==
=== Video albums ===
List of video albums, with selected chart positions and certifications
Title	Album details	Peak chart positions	Certifications
Title	Album details	US Video	Certifications
Live from Oklahoma... The Too Bad for Hell DVD!	Released: September 30, 2003; Label: DreamWorks; Format: DVD-V	—	RIAA: Gold
Live at the Wiltern LG DVD	Released: April 20, 2006; Label: Interscope; Format: DVD-V	—	
Tournado	Released: July 17, 2007; Label: Interscope; Format: DVD-V	7	
Schooled	Released: August 5, 2007; Label: Office Max; Format: DVD-V	—	

=== Music videos ===
Year	Song	Director	Ref.
2002	"Swing, Swing"	Marcos Siega	
2003	"The Last Song"	Charles Jensen	
2003	"Time Stands Still"	Meiert Avis	
2003	"My Paper Heart"	Atom Rothlein; Jeff Richter	
2005	"Dirty Little Secret"	Marcos Siega	
2006	"Move Along"	Marc Webb	
2006	"Top of the World"	Brandon Driscoll Luttringer	
2006	"It Ends Tonight"	Wayne Isham	
2008	"Mona Lisa (When the World Comes Down)"	Unknown	
2008	"Gives You Hell"	Marc Webb	
2009	"The Wind Blows"	Rich Lee	
2009	"I Wanna" (UK version)	Rich Lee	
2009	"I Wanna" (US version)	Paul Hunter	
2011	"Someday's Gone"	Jon Danovic	
2012	"Beekeeper's Daughter"	Isaac Rentz	
2012	"Kids in the Street"	Jon Danovic	
2012	"Walk Over Me"	Jon Danovic	
2015	"There's a Place"	Catherine Hardwicke	
2017	"Sweat" / "Close Your Eyes"	Jamie Thraves	
2019	"Send Her to Heaven"	Parker Croft	
2019	"Gen Why? (DGAF)"	Unknown	
2024	"Flagpole Sitta"	Unknown	
2025	"Sandbox"	Joseph Kahn	
2025	"Easy Come, Easy Go"	Justin Le Burgos	
2025	"Easy Come, Easy Go"	Andy Knight	
2025	"Easy Come, Easy Go"	Johnathan Rosenthal	

== Other appearances ==
Year	Song	Album
2006	"Can't Take It" (El Camino Prom Wagon Mix)	Snakes on a Plane: The Album
2007	"The Future Has Arrived"	Meet the Robinsons
2007	"Night Drive" (Acoustic)	Punk Goes Acoustic 2
2007	"It Ends Tonight" (Acoustic)	MTV Presents Laguna Beach: Summer Can Last Forever
2008	"Jack's Lament"	Nightmare Revisited
2009	"Real World"	Transformers: Revenge of the Fallen - The Album
2009	"Sierra's Song"	Soundtrack 90210
2010	"The Wind Blows" (Skrillex Remix)	Download to Donate for Haiti
2010	"The Poison"	Almost Alice
2010	"Move Along" (Live)	Warped Tour 15th Anniversary Celebration
