= Audra Mae =

American singer and songwriter (born 1984)

- Born: Audra Mae Butts; February 20, 1984 (age 42); Oklahoma City, Oklahoma, U.S.
- Genres: Folk rock; soul; EDM
- Occupations: Singer; songwriter
- Instruments: Vocals; guitar; piano
- Label: SideOneDummy

Audra Mae Butts (born February 20, 1984) is an American singer and songwriter from Oklahoma City, Oklahoma. Since arriving in California in 2007, she has signed a publishing deal with Warner/Chappell, and sang Bob Dylan's "Forever Young" on the television series Sons of Anarchy. In 2009, she signed to Los Angeles–based indie label SideOneDummy Records.

== Career ==
=== Early life and family ===
Audra Mae was born in Oklahoma to Christopher Butts and Alondra Lynn Havens. Her parents later divorced. She has a younger sister Amanda (born 1986), and a younger half-brother Youssef (born 2000) from her mother's second marriage.

She is the great-great-niece of Judy Garland, and a great-granddaughter of Garland's sister, Dorothy Virginia Gumm, making her a first cousin twice removed of Liza Minnelli and Lorna Luft.

=== 2009: Haunt EP ===
She released a digital EP Haunt on October 20, 2009, and then went on the road as part of Chuck Ragan's Revival Tour. That year, Audra also wrote a song for Britain's Got Talent runner up Susan Boyle's début album. "Who I Was Born to Be" was the only original track on Susan Boyle's chart-topping, 9 million- selling I Dreamed a Dream album. Audra Mae has performed as a member of The Upright Cabaret.

=== 2010–2012: The Happiest Lamb and Audra Mae and the Almighty Sound ===
The Happiest Lamb was released on May 18, 2010. The album was recorded with her friends including stand-up bassist Joe Ginsberg, guitarist Jarrad Kritzstein, pianist Frank Pedano and drummer Kiel Feher, who have played live with her in a series of residencies around the L.A. area. Together with Ferras Alqaisi she wrote "Good News", which was one of the songs that competed in Unser Song für Deutschland, the German selection process to select the song that Lena Meyer-Landrut will sing at the Eurovision Song Contest 2011. "Good News" also serves as the title track of Meyer-Landrut's eponymous 2011 album.

Audra Mae and the Almighty Sound was released on February 13, 2012. The album featured main and background vocals, percussion, production and composition work from Mae and also credited many other artists, including up-right bassist Joe Ginsberg, electric and rhythm guitarist Jarrad Kritzstein and organ and piano playing by Frank Pedano. In 2012, her cover of Whitesnake's "Here I Go Again" was featured in two episodes of The Good Wife, "Another Ham Sandwich" and "Live from Damascus." She also is featured on Flo Rida's track, "Run," with Redfoo of LMFAO, and on All American Rejects "Kids in the Street" released March 2012.

=== Since 2013 ===
Mae provided background vocals for The All-American Rejects (who also originated in Oklahoma) in their fourth studio album, Kids in the Street. She can be heard in "Fast & Slow", "Kids in the Street", and "Beekeeper's Daughter" In 2013, she was featured in 3 Avicii songs that were featured on his album True. The songs are "Addicted to You", "Shame on Me", and "Long Road To Hell". Avicii announced that "Addicted to You" would receive a full single release on April 7, 2014. She is featured in one of Jon Bellion's songs called "Luxury," which was released on September 2, 2014. Mae also co-wrote the songs "Somebody Loves Somebody" and "Breakaway" for Celine Dion, which were featured on Dion's album Loved Me Back to Life.

American country artist Miranda Lambert recorded Mae's "Little Red Wagon" for her 2014 album, Platinum, and released it as the album's third single in January 2015. It became a Top 10 hit on the Billboard Hot Country Songs chart, peaking at number 5. In 2015 she teamed up with Avicii once again to sing the cover by Avicii of "Feeling Good" by Nina Simone.

In February 2018, Mae released the album Love, Audra Mae, called "a love letter to the music of her ancestry, the loyal fans who've touched her heart and the enchantments of romances never forgotten."

On December 5, 2019, Mae performed songs she created with EDM artist Avicii at the Avicii Tribute Concert for Mental Health. All proceeds from this concert contributed to the Tim Bergling Foundation.

Audra Mae is one of the featured vocalists on the collection The Songs of Bacharach and Costello, singing several songs written jointly by Burt Bacharach and Elvis Costello.

== Toured with ==
- 2009 – Chuck Ragan
- 2009 – Kevin Seconds
- 2009 – Frank Turner
- 2009 – Jim Ward
- 2010 – Good Old War
- 2010 – Stephen Kellogg
- 2011 – Nick 13
- 2011 – Lucero
- 2012 – Matt Nathanson
- 2012 – The All-American Rejects
- 2012 – Cory Branan

== Discography ==
=== Studio albums ===
Title	Details
The Happiest Lamb	Released: May 18, 2010; Label: SideOneDummy Records; Format: Digital download, CD
Audra Mae and The Almighty Sound	Released: February 13, 2012; Label: SideOneDummy Records; Format: Digital download, CD
Love, Audra Mae	Released: February 20, 2018; Label: Audra Mae Records; Format: Digital download, CD

=== Extended plays ===
Title	Details
Haunt	Released: October 20, 2009; Label: SideOneDummy Records; Format: Digital download

=== Singles ===
==== As featured artist ====
Single	Year	Peak chart positions										Certifications	Album
Single	Year	AUS	AUT	DEN	FRA	GER	NL	NZ	SWE	SWI	UK	Certifications	Album
"Addicted to You" (Avicii featuring Audra Mae)	2014	5	3	40	10	6	5	27	11	5	14	GLF: 3× Platinum; ARIA: 4× Platinum; BPI: Platinum; BVMI: 3× Gold; IFPI AUT: Gold	True

=== Guest vocals ===
Year	Title	Album	Artist
2011	"Come Around" "Valentine"	Covering Ground	Chuck Ragan
2011	"Forever Young"	Songs of Anarchy: Music from Sons of Anarchy Seasons 1-4	Audra Mae and the Forest Rangers
2011	"Everyday People"	Songs of Anarchy: Music from Sons of Anarchy Seasons 1-4	Audra Mae and the Forest Rangers
2011	"The Unclouded Day"	Songs of Anarchy: Music from Sons of Anarchy Seasons 1-4	Audra Mae and the Forest Rangers
2011	"We Are Not Broken"	Same Something Different	Jake Walden
2011	"For Alice"	Same Something Different	Jake Walden
2012	"Run"	Wild Ones	Flo Rida feat. Redfoo
2012	"Beekeeper's Daughter"	Kids in the Street	The All-American Rejects
2012	"Kids in the Street"	Kids in the Street	The All-American Rejects
2012	"Fast & Slow"	Kids in the Street	The All-American Rejects
2013	"How I Feel"	The Perfect 10	Flo Rida
2013	"Addicted to You"	True	Avicii
2013	"Shame On Me"	True	Avicii
2013	"Long Road To Hell"	True	Avicii
2014	"Tree"	Idris Elba Presents mi Mandela	Idris Elba
2014	"Luxury"	The Definition	Jon Bellion
2015	"Feeling Good"	Feeling Good	Avicii
2015	"Shotgun"	Non-album single	Sean McConnell
2015	"I Got You"	Love & The Death of Damnation	The White Buffalo
2015	"The Future"	White Lies & Melodies	Mustered Courage
2016	"He Is The Same" (featuring Audra Mae)	The Human Condition	Jon Bellion
2019	"Heavy With Hoping"	Good Faith	Madeon

=== Songwriting credits ===
Title	Year	Artist(s)	Album	Written with
"Who I Was Born to Be"	2009	Susan Boyle	I Dreamed a Dream	Johan Fransson, Tim Larsson, Tobias Lundgren
"State of Mind"	2010	Zascha Moktan	State of Mind	—N/a
"Sing You Home"	2011	Xenia	Sing You Home	Johan Fransson, Tim Larsson, Tobias Lundgren
"Contact High"	2011	Allen Stone	Allen Stone	Allen Stone, Andrew Rose
"Sleep"	2011	Allen Stone	Allen Stone	Allen Stone, Andrew Rose
"Good News"	2011	Lena Meyer-Landrut	Good News	Ferras Alqaisi
"I'm Not Coming Home"	2012	Julian Ovenden	If You Stay	Johan Fransson, Tim Larsson, Tobias Lundgren
"Break Away"	2012	Ivy Quainoo	Ivy	Johan Fransson, Tim Larsson, Tobias Lundgren
"Dear John"	2013	Zak Waters	Lip Service	Zak Waters, Jarrad Kritzstein
"Shame on Me"	2013	Avicii	True	Avicii, Arash Pournouri, Sterling Fox
"Long Road to Hell"	2013	Avicii	True	Avicii, Arash Pournouri, Alex Seaver
"Somebody Loves Somebody"	2013	Celine Dion	Loved Me Back to Life	Johan Fransson, Tim Larsson, Tobias Lundgren
"Little Red Wagon"	2014	Miranda Lambert	Platinum	Joe Ginsberg
"Said and Done"	2014	Zak Waters	Now // Later	Zak Waters, Jarrad Kritzstein
"Heartbeat Song"	2015	Kelly Clarkson	Piece by Piece	Kara DioGuardi, Jason Evigan, Mitch Allan
"Eyes Wide Open"	2015	Sabrina Carpenter	Eyes Wide Open	Jerrod Bettis, Meghan Kabir
"Two Young Hearts"	2015	Sabrina Carpenter	Eyes Wide Open	Ben Berger, Ryan McMahon
"On Fire"	2015	Stefanie Heinzmann	Chance of Rain	Joacim Persson, Johan Alkenäs, Niclas Molinder
"Woman (Oh Mama)"	2015	Joy Williams	Venus	Joy Williams, Matt Morris
"Ossigeno"	2015	Francesco Sarcina	Femmina	Ermal Meta, Kevin Kadish, Nick Monson
"Can't Take Back the Bullet"	2015	Hey Violet	I Can Feel It	Casey Moreta, Chris Sernell, Jason Blume, Miranda Miller, Nia Lovelis, Rena Lovelis
"Water"	2015	Pentatonix	Pentatonix	Kevin Olusola, Kirstin Maldonado
"Take Me Home"	2015	Pentatonix	Pentatonix	Kevin Olusola, Kirstin Maldonado
"Light in the Hallway"	2015	Pentatonix	Pentatonix	Scott Hoying, Mitch Grassi
"Even Angels Cry"	2015	Reece Mastin	Change Colours	Reece Mastin, Michael Paynter, Michael Delorenzis
"Rebel Hearts"	2015	Hilary Duff	Breathe In. Breathe Out.	Hilary Duff, Christopher J. Baran, Skyler Stonestreet, Kara DioGuardi
"Shotgun"	2015	Christina Aguilera	Non-album single	Christina Aguilera, Sean McConnell
"The Real Thing"	2015	Christina Aguilera	Non-album single	Jackie Tohn
"What If It's You" (performed by Hayden Panettiere)	2015	Nashville Cast	The Music of Nashville: Season 4, Volume 1	Lily Elise, Scott Effman
"Swept Away" (performed by Lennon Stella and Jessy Schram)	2016	Nashville Cast	The Music of Nashville: Season 4, Volume 2	Jarrod Gorbel, Blake Sennett
"Running with the Wild Things"	2016	Against the Current	In Our Bones	Chrissy Costanza, Dan Gow, Will Ferri, Tom Schleiter
"Ugly"	2016	Fantasia	The Definition Of...	Nicolle Galyon
"Like Lightning"	2016	Idina Menzel	Idina	Idina Menzel, Eric Rosse
"Drivin' Around"	2017	Little Big Town	The Breaker	Kameron Alexander, David Embree, Todd Spadafore
"Honest"	2017	The Chainsmokers	Memories...Do Not Open	Andrew Taggart, Sean Douglas
"Didn't I"	2017	Kelly Clarkson	Meaning of Life	Andre Davidson, Sean Davidson, Katie Pearlman
"Fall in Line" (featuring Demi Lovato)	2018	Christina Aguilera	Liberation	Christina Aguilera, Jon Bellion, Mark Williams, Raul Cubina, Jonny Simpson
"Power"	2018	Joy Crookes	Influence	Joy Crookes, Alex Hope
"New"	2019	Ben Platt	Sing to Me Instead	Ben Platt, Andrew Wells
"Language"	2019	Tori Kelly	Inspired by True Events	Tori Kelly, Justin Tranter
"Heavy with Hoping"	2019	Madeon	Good Faith	Madeon
"These Wings"	2019	Claire Richards	My Wildest Dreams	Johan Fransson, Tim Larsson, Tobias Lundgren
"Do or Die"	2020	Wild Rivers	Songs to Break Up to	Khalid Yassein
"Stone Cold"	2020	Kree Harrison	Chosen Family Tree	Hailey Whitters, Skylar Wilson
"Chosen Family Tree"	2020	Kree Harrison	Chosen Family Tree	Kree Harrison, Fancy Hagood, Skylar Wilson
"Just Like a River Does"	2020	Birdy	Piano Sketches	Birdy, Sam Ellis
"Pick Up Your Feelings"	2021	Jazmine Sullivan	Heaux Tales	Jazmine Sullivan, Denisia "Blu June" Andrews, Brittany "Chi" Coney, Kyle Coleman, Michael Holmes
"Dead Man Runnin"	2022	Seulgi	28 Reasons	Yaakov "Yash" Gruzman, Shaun Frank
