= Kids in the Street =

Kids in the Street may refer to:

- Kids in the Street (The All-American Rejects album), 2012 album by The All-American Rejects
  - "Kids in the Street" (song), title track from the album
- Kids in the Street (Justin Townes Earle album), 2017

== See also ==
- Kids on the Street, 1996 album by the Cherry Poppin' Daddies
