= Live from Oklahoma... The Too Bad for Hell DVD! =

Video by the All-American Rejects
- Released: September 30, 2003
- Recorded: May 30, 2003
- Venue: Brady Theater (Tulsa, Oklahoma)
- Length: 60:05
- Label: DreamWorks
- Director: Atom Rothlein
- Producer: Melissa Voyagis; Jennifer Rothlein

The All-American Rejects chronology
Live from Oklahoma... The Too Bad for Hell DVD! (2003)	Live at the Wiltern LG DVD (2006)

Live from Oklahoma... The Too Bad for Hell DVD! is the first video release by American rock band the All-American Rejects, recorded at the Brady Theater in Tulsa, Oklahoma on May 30, 2003, and released on September 30, 2003.

== Reception ==
The video received mixed reviews from critics. AllMusic saw the overall production as "sloppy and technically inferior affair that's as charisma-free as the band it highlight", with its "overly dark concert footage" and "murky audio completes the lackluster audiovisual package", but said that the videos for "Swing, Swing" and "The Last Song" rounded out the DVD perfectly. Punknews.org were more positive in their review, saying "This DVD proves the band is really, really tight for the majority of their 45 minute set. The vocal harmonies are dead-on, the extra bells and whistles are perfectly timed, and the band just plays really, really tightly", with the only flaw being lead guitarist Nick Wheeler's solo on the song "Your Star", calling it "horribly cringe-worthy, but it's really the only blemish of the set."

DVD Talk applauded the production of the DVD, but saw the "Lost in Stillwater" documentary extra as "OK, but not great" as it featured "some blurred images and video 'wash out'".

== Concert setlist ==
No.	Title	Length
1.	"Intro"
2.	"Don't Leave Me"
3.	"One More Sad Song"
4.	"My Paper Heart"
5.	"Happy Endings"
6.	"Time Stands Still"
7.	"Too Far Gone"
8.	"Why Worry"
9.	"Your Star"
10.	"Swing, Swing"
11.	"The Last Song"

Bonus features
No.	Title	Length
1.	"Swing, Swing" (music video)	3:29
2.	"The Last Song" (music video)	4:35
3.	"Lost in Stillwater"	9:59

== Certifications ==
Region	Certification	Certified units/sales
United States (RIAA)	Gold	50,000^{^}
^{^} Shipments figures based on certification alone.
