= Your Star =

Your Star may refer to:

== Songs ==
- "Your Star", a song by Evanescence from their second studio album, The Open Door.
- "Your Star", a song by The All-American Rejects from their self-titled album, The All-American Rejects.
