= Shotgun (Christina Aguilera song) =

Promotional single by Christina Aguilera with the Nashville Cast
- Released: April 21, 2015
- Genre: Country, country pop
- Length: 3:18
- Label: Lionsgate Television
- Composers: Christina Aguilera, Sean McConnell, Audra Mae
- Producer: Buddy Miller

"Shotgun" is a song recorded by American singer Christina Aguilera with the Nashville Cast. It was featured on episode "The Storm Has Just Begun" of the third season of Nashville. The song was released on April 21, 2015, as a promotional single for Nashville. A country pop ballad about a long-lasting love, for Aguilera herself the song examines the theme of relationships and partners who "have stood the test of time."

"Shotgun" received positive reviews from music critics. Aguilera sang the song at the 50th Annual Academy of Country Music Awards, accompanied by Rascal Flatts. Their performance segued into "Riot" from the country trio's Rewind album. The promotional single debuted at number fourteen on Billboard's Bubbling Under Hot 100, as well as at number seven on the Country Digital Songs chart.

== Background and release ==
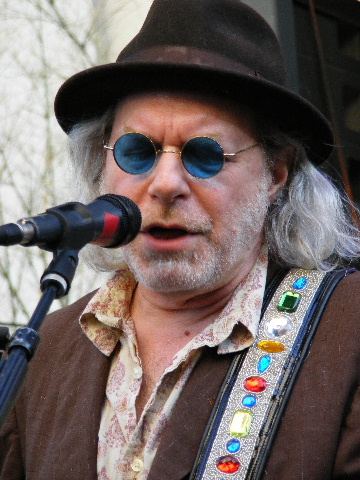
Country musician Buddy Miller produced the song.

"Shotgun" is a downtempo country pop ballad, and a second song by Christina Aguilera recorded for the ABC musical drama series Nashville (the first one being "The Real Thing"). Digital Spy's editor Lewis Corner called it a "slow and rousing" ballad and the exact opposite of "The Real Thing", which was a "jaunty pop-rock bop". The singer portrayed Jade St. John, the ex-fiancée of former record label boss Jeff Fordham, over three episodes of the series. Speaking to ABC News, Aguilera described her character:

"Jade St. John is a pop star, but her first love is in country and she really wants to make a country album. And as she's passing by town with her tour, she really takes the opportunity to sort of experience Nashville and make some contacts for herself. But really she's just a huge fan of country and she just wants to dive right in."

"I really love the song. It speaks to long-lasting love, the roads it takes, the turns it makes and how it lasts forever. When I perform it, I really think of that older couple who have been through it all and who have stood the test of time with the changes that their relationship goes through."

— Aguilera about the meaning of the song.

Co-written by Aguilera, Sean McConnell and Audra Mae, and produced by Buddy Miller, "Shotgun" is a love song about the strength of an emotional relationship and its stability. A long-term love affair is compared to riding shotgun in a car and then taking over its wheel ("When you're tired, I'll grab the wheel / And you take over when I'm done / Love is taking turns / Riding shotgun"). In the chorus Aguilera sings: "It's a hard road honey, and there ain't nobody I'd rather be next to." For the artist herself the song examines two partners who have stood the "test of time" as their relationship goes through different life stages.

The song was released on April 21, 2015, as a promotional single meant to support Aguilera's appearance in the series, and its snippet leaked on April 10. Although both "Shotgun" and "The Real Thing" officially premiered as digital singles, neither song appears on The Music of Nashville: Season 3, Volume 2 album due to label rights (Aguilera being a RCA artist, and the soundtrack being released under Big Machine Records).

== Critical reception ==
"Shotgun" received critical acclaim. Music Times editor Carolyn Menyes praised both Aguilera as a "powerhouse diva" and the song for its "stripped down, banjo-filled" sound. Zuzanna Janicka from The Rockferry ranked "Shotgun" among Aguilera's "best unknown songs", explaining: "Three years after 'Just a Fool' was released Aguilera recorded something better: a song that's restricted vocally but even more emotional. A simpler, quieter song, a thriving one." Cosmopolitan's Rebecca Rose expressed her curiosity about whether Aguilera will "keep venturing into other music genres", and added: "one thing is for sure — I'm going to play [the song] on repeat basically forever."

== Live performance ==
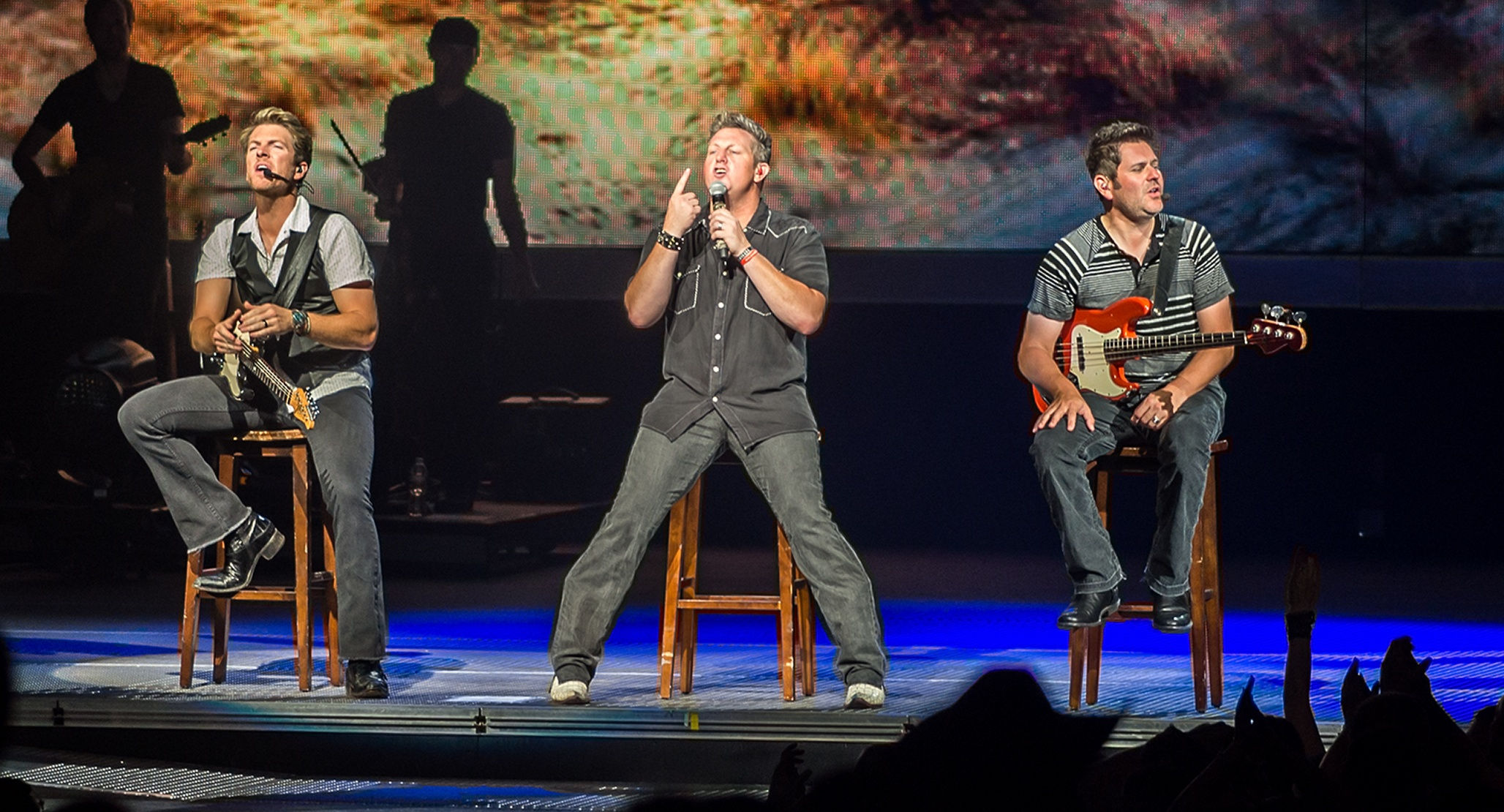
Aguilera sang "Shotgun" with Rascal Flatts at the 2015 Academy of Country Music Awards.

Aguilera performed the "stripped-down" song with the Columbus-based country group Rascal Flatts at the 50th Annual Academy of Country Music Awards. Journalist Carolyn Menyes thought the rendition showed a "softer side" of the singer and elaborated: "Through the lens of her character Jade St. John, Aguilera turns her throaty vocals into a twang alongside a male accompaniment, and it's effective as a country single." The performance segued into the band's song "Riot" — forming a medley — and featured a small choir. The Source thought Aguilera and Rascal Flatts paired "surprisingly well", and the Taste of Country editor Rebekah Bell hailed it as a "stellar" performance. Billboard noted that the artistic delivery was commended by the audience.

== Charts ==
"Shotgun" debuted at number 28 on the US Hot Country Songs, becoming Aguilera's first entry on the chart. It also debuted at number 14 on the Bubbling Under Hot 100, and it managed to sell 30,000 copies before it was taken down from iTunes that week.

Chart (2015)	Peak position
US Bubbling Under Hot 100 (Billboard)	14
US Country Digital Songs (Billboard)	7
US Hot Country Songs (Billboard)	28
US Digital Song Sales (Billboard)	43

== Release history ==
Region	Date	Format	Label
United States	April 21, 2015	Digital download	Lionsgate Television ABC Studios

== Sean McConnell version ==
Sean McConnell, who co-wrote the song, recorded his own version of it, also titled "Shotgun". The folk rock cover features Audra Mae and was released on October 2, 2015, by 333 Entertainment.
