= Who I Was Born to Be =

Song by Susan Boyle

from the album I Dreamed a Dream
- Released: 23 November 2009
- Genre: Adult Contemporary
- Length: 4:08
- Label: Syco/Columbia
- Composers: Johan Fransson, Tim Larsson, Tobias Lundgren
- Lyricist: Audra Mae
- Producer: Steve Mac

"Who I Was Born to Be" is the first original song recorded by Susan Boyle. Appearing on her multi-platinum debut album I Dreamed a Dream, the song has become a staple in Boyle's repertoire. This song's lyrics describe Boyle's decades-long dream of becoming a professional singer. The lyrics have become associated with Boyle, who titled her autobiography "The Woman I Was Born to Be".

== History ==
The lyrics were written by singer-songwriter Audra Mae, grandniece of Judy Garland. In an interview with MTV Audra Mae stated, "I knew it needed to be a song that made sense for her to sing, so I went online and researched her and her life and found out how she got to be where she is, and it came from that." "I knew it needed to be something that she could be proud to sing," Mae explained. "Almost like a mantra — and I'm thrilled she liked it enough to put it on the album." The instrumental was composed by Johan Fransson, Tim Larsson, and Tobias Lundgren.

== Performances ==
Among her most notable performances of "Who I Was Born to Be", Boyle's first live performance of this song was on 7 December 2009 in London before an audience for the taping of her television special I Dreamed a Dream: The Susan Boyle Story. "Who I Was Born to Be" was used as the theme song for the anime Welcome to the Space Show which was released in 2010. Boyle performed the song on The Oprah Winfrey Show in Chicago on 19 January, 2010. On 10 July 2011 she performed it in front of a live audience of 58,000 in the Shanghai Grand Stadium for China's Got Talent viewed by a 560 million television audience. In recent years Boyle performed "Who I Was Born to Be" in an appearance at the end of the touring musical I Dreamed a Dream in the U.K. March-October 2012 and during her Susan Boyle in Concert tour of Scotland in July 2013. In August 2013 Boyle performed the song during the opening ceremonies of the 2013 Special Olympics held at the Royal Crescent in Bath.
