= Platinum (Miranda Lambert album) =

Studio album by Miranda Lambert
- Released: June 3, 2014
- Genre: Country
- Length: 58:15
- Label: RCA Nashville
- Producer: Frank Liddell; Chuck Ainlay; Glenn Worf

Miranda Lambert chronology
Four the Record (2011)	Platinum (2014)	The Weight of These Wings (2016)

Singles from Platinum
- 1. "Automatic" Released: February 17, 2014; 2. "Somethin' Bad" Released: May 19, 2014; 3. "Little Red Wagon" Released: January 12, 2015; 4. "Smokin' and Drinkin'" Released: June 22, 2015

Platinum is the fifth studio album by American country music singer and songwriter Miranda Lambert. It was released on June 3, 2014, by RCA Nashville.

Lambert wrote or co-wrote eight of the album's 16 tracks while working with a host of session musicians and songwriters, as well as guest performers Little Big Town, The Time Jumpers, and Carrie Underwood. The album was produced by Frank Liddell, Chuck Ainlay, and Glenn Worf.

Platinum debuted at number one on the Billboard 200, becoming Lambert's first to top the chart, while selling 180,000 copies in its first week. It received widespread critical acclaim and earned Lambert a Grammy Award for Best Country Album as well as a CMA Award and ACM Award in the same category. The album was certified platinum for sales of one million copies in the United States.

== Writing and recording ==
Lambert wrote or co-wrote eight of the album's 16 tracks. The album features collaborations with Little Big Town ("Smokin' and Drinkin'") and The Time Jumpers ("All That's Left"), as well as a duet with Carrie Underwood on "Somethin' Bad". It was recorded in sessions at Cyclops Sound in Los Angeles, Dave's Room in Hollywood, and the Nashville-based studios Ronnie's Place, Ben's Studio, Sound Stage Studios, St. Charles Studio, and The House.

== Release and promotion ==
Platinum was released by RCA Nashville on June 3, 2014. It debuted at number one on both the Billboard 200 and Top Country Albums charts while selling 180,000 copies in the United States, becoming the highest first-sales week of Lambert's career. It was also her first album to reach the top of the Billboard 200, and marked her fifth consecutive number-one debut on the Top Country Albums, making her the first artist in the history of the chart to start her career with five number-one albums. It debuted at number one on the Canadian Albums Chart with first-week sales of 9,300 copies. On February 1, 2016, it was certified platinum by the Recording Industry Association of America (RIAA). By September 2016, the album had sold 850,000 copies in the US.

Four singles were released in promotion of the album: the lead single "Automatic", the top-20 hit "Little Red Wagon", "Smokin' and Drinkin'", and "Somethin' Bad". Lambert debut the latter song with Underwood at the 2014 Billboard Music Awards on May 18, 2014, and performed it again on June 4, during the CMT Music Awards. In support of Platinum, she embarked on a concert tour of North America in mid 2014, featuring Justin Moore and Thomas Rhett as her opening acts.

== Critical reception ==
Professional ratings
Aggregate scores
Source	Rating
Metacritic	86/100
Review scores
Source	Rating
AllMusic	4.5/5 stars
American Songwriter	4/5 stars
Cuepoint (Expert Witness)	A
Entertainment Weekly	A
The Guardian	4/5 stars
Los Angeles Times	3.5/4 stars
PopMatters	7/10
Rolling Stone	4/5 stars
Spin	7/10
USA Today	3/4 stars

Platinum was met with widespread critical acclaim. At Metacritic, which assigns a normalized rating out of 100 to reviews from mainstream publications, the album received an average score of 86, based on 11 reviews.

In a review published by Cuepoint, Robert Christgau hailed Platinum as the year's most daring and consummate big-budget record, featuring "apolitical de facto feminism at its countriest". The New York Times critic Jon Caramanica found it "vivacious, clever and slickly rowdy", showing Lambert had finally become "a sophisticated radical, a wry country feminist and an artist learning to experiment widely but also with less abrasion". Stephen Thomas Erlewine from AllMusic said the record was shrewdly produced with Lambert's attempts at modern pop songs sequenced ahead of the more authentic country material, while Will Hermes wrote in Rolling Stone that Lambert incorporated both traditional and alternative elements from country into her homespun, feminine perspective. Spin magazine's Dan Hyman was less enthusiastic, singling out the collaborations on "Smokin' and Drinkin'" and "Something Bad" as contrived appeals to pop audiences on what was an otherwise consistent and carefully crafted record.

At the end of 2014, Platinum was voted the 12th-best album of the year in the Pazz & Jop, an annual poll of American critics published by The Village Voice. Christgau, the poll's creator, named it the year's second best record in his year-end list for The Barnes & Noble Review. The album was also ranked fifth and nineteenth best by Rolling Stone and Spin, respectively. At the 2014 CMA Awards, it won in the "Album of the Year" category. It also earned Lambert the Best Country Album award at the 57th Grammy Awards in 2015.

== Track listing ==
No.	Title	Writer(s)	Length
1.	"Girls"	Nicolle Galyon, Natalie Hemby, Jimmy Robbins	3:35
2.	"Platinum"	Miranda Lambert, Galyon, Hemby	3:11
3.	"Little Red Wagon"	Audra Mae, Joe Ginsberg	3:24
4.	"Smokin' and Drinkin'" (featuring Little Big Town)	Hemby, Luke Laird, Shane McAnally	5:30
5.	"Priscilla"	Galyon, Hemby, Robbins	3:26
6.	"Automatic"	Lambert, Galyon, Hemby	4:07
7.	"Bathroom Sink"	Lambert	4:05
8.	"Old Shit"	Brent Cobb, Neil Mason	2:45
9.	"All That's Left" (featuring The Time Jumpers)	Dixie Hall, Tom T. Hall	3:11
10.	"Gravity Is a Bitch"	Lambert, Scotty Wray	3:08
11.	"Babies Makin' Babies"	Galyon, Hemby, Robbins	2:56
12.	"Somethin' Bad" (duet with Carrie Underwood)	Chris DeStefano, Brett James, Priscilla Renea	2:49
13.	"Holding on to You"	Lambert, Jessi Alexander, Ashley Monroe	4:32
14.	"Two Rings Shy"	Lambert, Brandy Clark, Heather Little	3:18
15.	"Hard Staying Sober"	Lambert, Hemby, Laird	4:28
16.	"Another Sunday in the South"	Lambert, Alexander, Monroe	3:50
Total length:			58:15

== Personnel ==
=== Musicians ===
- Brad Albin – upright bass on "All That's Left"
- Jessi Alexander – background vocals
- Richard Bennett – banjo, bouzouki, acoustic guitar, electric guitar, tiple
- Jams Byous – background vocals
- Matt Chamberlain – drums, percussion
- Dr. G.K. Drakoulias – background vocals
- Glen Duncan – fiddle, acoustic guitar, mandolin
- Fred Eltringham – percussion
- Karen Fairchild – background vocals on "Smokin' and Drinkin'"
- Larry Franklin – fiddle and background vocals on "All That's Left"
- Paul Franklin – steel guitar on "All That's Left"
- Nicole Galyon – background vocals
- Vince Gill – electric guitar and background vocals on "All That's Left"
- Warren Givens – background vocals
- Ranger Doug Green – acoustic guitar and background vocals on "All That's Left"
- Mallary Hope Whitener – background vocals
- Jedd Hughes – electric guitar, baritone guitar
- John Barlow Jarvis – keyboards, piano, synthesizer
- Carolyn Dawn Johnson – background vocals
- Jay Joyce – dobro, acoustic guitar, electric guitar, keyboards, mandolin, Hammond organ, synthesizer
- Miranda Lambert – lead vocals
- Stephanie Lambring – background vocals
- Greg Leisz – acoustic guitar, steel guitar
- Heather Little – background vocals
- Audra Mae – background vocals
- Gene Miller – background vocals
- Ashley Monroe – background vocals
- Eddie "Scarlito" Perez – acoustic guitar, electric guitar
- Marty Raybon – background vocals
- Andy Reiss – electric guitar on "All That's Left"
- Mike Rojas – piano, synthesizer
- Mando Saenz – harmonica
- Kimberly Schlapman – background vocals on "Smokin' and Drinkin'"
- Randy Scruggs – acoustic guitar, electric guitar, national steel guitar, slide guitar
- Dawn Sears – vocals on "All That's Left"
- Kenny Sears – fiddle and background vocals on "All That's Left"
- Aubrie Sellers – background vocals
- Gwen Sebastian – background vocals
- Joe Spivey – fiddle and background vocals on "All That's Left"
- Chris Stapleton – background vocals
- Harry Stinson – background vocals
- Phillip Sweet – background vocals on "Smokin' and Drinkin'"
- Jeff Taylor – accordion, piano, and background vocals on "All That's Left"
- Billy Thomas – drums on "All That's Left"
- Carrie Underwood – vocals on "Somethin' Bad"
- Jimi Westbrook – background vocals on "Smokin' and Drinkin'"
- Glenn Worf – bass guitar, upright bass

=== Production ===
- Chuck Ainlay – Engineer, Mixing
- Dave Bianco – Engineer
- Paul Cossette – Assistant
- Brittany Hamlin – Production coordination
- Kam Luchterhand – Assistant
- Gavin Lurssen – Mastering
- Randee St. Nicholas – Photography
- Matt Rausch – Engineer
- Leslie Richter – Assistant
- Brandon Schexnayder – Assistant
- Matt Wheeler – Engineer

== Charts ==
=== Weekly charts ===
Chart (2014–15)	Peak position
Australian Albums (ARIA)	8
Canadian Albums (Billboard)	1
UK Country Albums Chart	2
US Billboard 200	1
US Top Country Albums (Billboard)	1

=== Year-end charts ===
Chart (2014)	Position
US Billboard 200	30
US Top Country Albums (Billboard)	8

Chart (2015)	Position
US Billboard 200	76
US Top Country Albums (Billboard)	15

=== Decade-end charts ===
Chart (2010–2019)	Position
US Billboard 200	174
US Top Country Albums (Billboard)	43

== Certifications ==
Region	Certification	Certified units/sales
United States (RIAA)	Platinum	1,000,000^{‡}
^{‡} Sales+streaming figures based on certification alone.
