= Little Red Wagon (song) =

Single by Miranda Lambert

from the album Platinum
- Released: January 12, 2015
- Recorded: 2013–14
- Genre: Country rock
- Length: 3:24
- Label: RCA Nashville
- Songwriter(s): Audra Mae; Joe Ginsberg
- Producer(s): Frank Liddell; Chuck Ainlay; Glenn Worf

Miranda Lambert singles chronology
"Somethin' Bad" (2014)	"Little Red Wagon" (2015)	"Smokin' and Drinkin'" (2015)

Music videos
- "Little Red Wagon" on YouTube

"Little Red Wagon" is a song written by Audra Mae and Joe Ginsberg, and originally recorded by Mae on her 2012 album Audra Mae and the Almighty Sound. It was covered by Miranda Lambert on her fifth studio album Platinum, and was released as its third single in January 2015.

The titular line of the song, "You can't ride in my little red wagon, the front seat's broken and the axle's dragging" is a reference to a popular call and response song in American children's camps. The song's origins are difficult to trace, and there are many variations, but the song at least dates back to the 1970s.

== Recording ==
Lambert said that she first heard of the song when John Eddie, with whom she had been touring at the time, recommended that she listen to an Audra Mae album. Upon hearing the song, Lambert wanted to record it, and asked Mae for permission to do so.

== Critical reception ==
Giving it a B+, Jon Freeman of Country Weekly wrote that "it's still fun to hear her back in spitfire mode". He praised the "strong use of dynamics" in the production, but thought that the lyrics were "on the silly side of cheeky".

== Commercial performance ==
"Little Red Wagon" debuted at number 60 on the Billboard Country Airplay chart for the week dated January 10, 2015. It also debuted at number 49 on the U.S. Billboard Hot Country Songs chart for the week of August 23, 2014, several months before being released as a single. The song peaked at No. 5 on Hot Country Songs chart for chart dated March 28, 2015, and No. 55 on the Billboard Hot 100 the same week. As of July 2015, the song has sold 432,000 downloads in the US.

== Music video ==
The music video was directed by Trey Fanjoy and premiered on March 11, 2015. In the video, Lambert is shown checking into a remote motel surrounded by desert. She is shown walking her pet dog, lounging beside the pool, and sitting on one of the motel beds while the motel's housekeeper and receptionist are seen dancing while on the job. The video ends with Lambert leaving in her airstream brandishing a belt that reads 'Mrs. Shelton,' a reference to her marriage with Blake Shelton.

== Chart performance ==
=== Weekly charts ===
Chart (2015)	Peak position
Canada (Canadian Hot 100)	56
Canada Country (Billboard)	22
US Billboard Hot 100	55
US Country Airplay (Billboard)	16
US Hot Country Songs (Billboard)	5

=== Year-end charts ===
Chart (2015)	Position
US Country Airplay (Billboard)	77
US Hot Country Songs (Billboard)	60

== Certifications ==
Region	Certification	Certified units/sales
United States (RIAA)	Platinum	1,000,000^{‡}
^{‡} Sales+streaming figures based on certification alone.
