= Smokin' and Drinkin' =

Single by Miranda Lambert featuring Little Big Town

from the album Platinum
- Released: June 22, 2015
- Recorded: 2013–14
- Genre: Country
- Length: 3:51 (radio edit); 5:30 (album version)
- Label: RCA Nashville
- Songwriter(s): Natalie Hemby; Shane McAnally; Luke Laird
- Producer(s): Frank Liddell; Chuck Ainlay; Glenn Worf

Miranda Lambert singles chronology
"Little Red Wagon" (2015)	"Smokin' and Drinkin'" (2015)	"Vice" (2016)

Little Big Town singles chronology
"Girl Crush" (2014)	"Smokin' and Drinkin'" (2015)	"Pain Killer" (2015)

"Smokin' and Drinkin'" is a song recorded as a duet by American country music artist Miranda Lambert and American country music group Little Big Town. It was released to radio on June 22, 2015 as the fourth and final single from Lambert's fifth studio album Platinum (2014). The song was written by Natalie Hemby, Shane McAnally and Luke Laird.

== Commercial performance ==
"Smokin' and Drinkin'" debuted at number 55 on the Billboard Country Airplay chart for the week ending July 4, 2015. It also debuted at number 38 on the U.S. Billboard Hot Country Songs chart for the week of November 22, 2014, before it was released as a single. It reached a peak of number 33 on the Billboard Country Airplay chart, becoming her lowest-peaking single release since 2009's "Dead Flowers" also failed to reach the top 20. The song has sold 132,000 copies in the US as of September 2015.

== Music video ==
The music video was directed by Paul Miller and it featured Lambert, Westbrook, Fairchild, Sweet and Schlapman performing the song at the 2014 CMA Awards.

== Charts ==
Chart (2015)	Peak position
Canada Country (Billboard)	46
US Hot Country Songs (Billboard)	32
US Country Airplay (Billboard)	33
