= The All-American Rejects (album) =

Studio album by the All-American Rejects
- Released: October 15, 2002
- Recorded: 2001
- Studios: Mission Sound (Brooklyn, New York); Headgear Studio (Williamsburg, Brooklyn, New York)
- Genres: Pop-punk; alternative rock; pop rock; power pop; emo pop
- Length: 42:54
- Labels: Doghouse; DreamWorks (re-release)
- Producer: Tim O'Heir

The All-American Rejects chronology
Same Girl, New Songs (2001)	The All-American Rejects (2002)	Move Along (2005)

Singles from The All-American Rejects
- 1. "Swing, Swing" Released: December 2, 2002; 2. "The Last Song" Released: April 21, 2003; 3. "Time Stands Still" Released: July 14, 2003

The All-American Rejects is the debut studio album by American rock band the All-American Rejects, originally released October 15, 2002, by Doghouse Records before being re-released on February 4, 2003, by DreamWorks Records. It was the band's only album as a duo, as rhythm guitarist Mike Kennerty and drummer Chris Gaylor joined the band soon before the album was released.

== Production and promotion ==
The band duo of Tyson Ritter and Nick Wheeler recorded the album in 2001 after being signed by the independent label Doghouse Records. Sessions were held at Mission Sound and Headgear Studio, Brooklyn, New York City, with producer and engineer Tim O'Heir. He mixed the album at Mission Sound; it was mastered by Emily Lazar at The Lodge in New York City. The other two band members Mike Kennerty and Chris Gaylor joined the band only after Ritter and Wheeler's first single "Swing, Swing” had already been recorded.

In October, the band went on tour with CKY. They later released The All-American Rejects on October 15, 2002. It was promoted with two release shows, and two acoustic in-store performances. The following month, the band went on tour with Motion City Soundtrack and Northstar. The album attracted the attention of DreamWorks Records, who signed the All-American Rejects to them and re-released their LP in early 2003, when it gained commercial success; earning a gold certification in Canada and a platinum certification in the United States. On January 28, 2003, the band performed on The Late Late Show. In April 2003, the band filmed a music video for "The Last Song" in Los Angeles, California. In May 2003, the band went on a tour of Canada, with Flashlight Brown. On June 11, the band appeared on The Tonight Show with Jay Leno. Between mid-July and early August, the group appeared on the Warped Tour. On July 21, the band performed on Total Request Live. Following Warped Tour, the band appeared at the Terremoto Festival. On September 30, the band appeared on MuchOnDemand. In November, they went on tour of the UK with Motion City Soundtrack and Limbeck.

The All-American Rejects was released as a CD, a vinyl LP pressed in orange (also pressed in a limited amount of red and blue) and a cassette tape exclusively in Indonesia.

== Singles ==
The band's debut single "Swing, Swing" was released on December 2, 2002, when they were joined by two new members; Mike Kennerty on rhythm guitar and Chris Gaylor on drums - months after recording the album. "Swing, Swing" peaked at #8 on the Billboard Modern Rock Tracks in the United States and #13 on the UK Singles Chart respectively, gaining the band media attention on both sides of the Atlantic, a music video followed its release on January 7, 2003. The second single "The Last Song" was released on April 21, 2003 and charted on the US Billboard Modern Rock Tracks at #29 and the UK Singles Chart at #69, a music video followed its release a month later.

The band's third and final single from the album "Time Stands Still" was released on July 14, 2003, but gained no commercial success. A music video directed by Meiert Avis followed its release in August. The album's opening track "My Paper Heart" was later released in late 2003 as a promotional single - a music video made up of footage from the band's Live from Oklahoma... The Too Bad for Hell DVD! as well as their "Lost in Stillwater" documentary was released to help promote it.

== Critical reception ==
Professional ratings
Review scores
Source	Rating
AllMusic	4/5 stars
Blender	1/5 stars
Common Sense Media	4/5 stars
IGN	7/10
LAS Magazine	Favorable
Melodic	4/5 stars
Now	1/5 stars
PopMatters	(average)
Rolling Stone	3/5 stars
Spin	A−

The All-American Rejects received mixed reviews from music critics. Spin magazine gave it a grade of A−.

AllMusic stated that the All-American Rejects are "A talented band destined for great things" and that "[The band] are capable songwriters, accomplished vocalists, and skilled instrumentalists. Guitar-driven and underpinned with a humane-sounding drum machine cranking out frenetic backbeats, each cut on this self-titled debut brims with harmonies that recall the early Who and classic Beach Boys. Kaj Roth of Melodic stated that the pop rock duo had "plenty of good vibes and catchy uptempo powerpop that will force the rain to take a hike and let the sun shine through", and favoured the song "Your Star"; saying it has "A superb groove that will make you ride a horse on the rodeo" and that "'Time Stands Still' will make the flowers bloom in the middle of winter."

Elizabeth Bromstein of Now magazine was more negative towards the sound of the album and gave it a rating of 1 out of 5 stars, quoting "As if their horrifyingly overdone pop-punk thing weren't bad enough, The All-American Rejects seem intent on embodying their name. Every last song on this record deals with lost love and loneliness. Incorporating the odd classic rock or 80s pop element doesn't improve things. In fact, it makes it worse, since it feels like they've crammed everything they know in here."

The album was included at number 49 on Rock Sound's "The 51 Most Essential Pop Punk Albums of All Time" list. BuzzFeed included the album at number 35 on their "36 Pop Punk Albums You Need To Hear Before You F——ing Die" list. Alternative Press ranked "Swing, Swing" at number 19 on their list of the best 100 singles from the 2000s.

== Track listing ==
All songs written by the All-American Rejects (Tyson Ritter & (Nick Wheeler).

No.	Title	Length
1.	"My Paper Heart"	3:49
2.	"Your Star"	4:21
3.	"Swing, Swing"	3:53
4.	"Time Stands Still"	3:31
5.	"One More Sad Song"	3:04
6.	"Why Worry"	4:16
7.	"Don't Leave Me"	3:28
8.	"Too Far Gone"	4:05
9.	"Drive Away"	3:00
10.	"Happy Endings"	4:25
11.	"The Last Song"	5:00
Total length:		42:47

Japanese / UK bonus track/ Amazon USA CD
No.	Title	Length
12.	"The Cigarette Song"	3:36
Total length:		46:23

== Personnel ==
Personnel per booklet.

The All-American Rejects

- Tyson Ritter – vocals, bass
- Nick Wheeler – guitars, drums, keyboards, programming

Production and design

- Tim O'Heir – producer, engineer, mixing
- Emily Lazar – mastering
- The All-American Rejects – art direction
- Asterik Studio – illustrations, layout
- Erin Thompson – object photography

== Charts ==
=== Weekly charts ===
Weekly chart performance for The All-American Rejects
Chart (2003)	Peak position
Canadian Albums (Nielsen SoundScan)	64
Japanese Albums (Oricon)	86
Scottish Albums (Official Charts)	44
UK Albums (Official Charts)	50
US Billboard 200	25
US Heatseekers Albums (Billboard)	8
US Independent Albums (Billboard)	9

=== Year-end charts ===
Year-end chart performance for The All-American Rejects
Chart (2003)	Position
US Billboard 200	75

== Certifications ==
Certifications and sales for The All-American Rejects
Region	Certification	Certified units/sales
Canada (Music Canada)	Gold	50,000^{^}
United Kingdom (BPI)	Silver	60,000^{*}
United States (RIAA)	Platinum	1,000,000^{^}
^{*} Sales figures based on certification alone.^{^} Shipments figures based on certification alone.

== Release history ==
Release dates and formats for The All-American Rejects
Country	Date	Format	Label
United States	October 15, 2002 (original)	CD; digital download	Doghouse
Australia	January 17, 2003	CD; digital download	DreamWorks
United States	February 4, 2003 (re-release)	CD; digital download	DreamWorks
United Kingdom	March 3, 2003	CD; digital download	Polydor
United States	December 9, 2008	Vinyl LP	DreamWorks
