= Time Stands Still (The All-American Rejects song) =

Single by The All-American Rejects

from the album The All-American Rejects
- Released: July 14, 2003
- Recorded: 2001
- Genre: Pop rock
- Length: 3:30
- Label: DreamWorks; Doghouse
- Songwriters: Nick Wheeler; Tyson Ritter
- Producer: Tim O'Heir

The All-American Rejects singles chronology
"The Last Song" (2003)	"Time Stands Still" (2003)	"Dirty Little Secret" (2005)

Music video
- "Time Stands Still" on YouTube

"Time Stands Still" is a song by American rock band The All-American Rejects, released as the third and final single from their self-titled debut studio album on July 14, 2003.

== Background and composition ==
“Time Stands Still” was written by Nick Wheeler and Tyson Ritter. "It's about a chick, pretty much," Ritter explained, "It's pretty much about my ex-girlfriend and the ins and outs of the relationship. It's about me wishing that nothing would change from that honeymoon period, the first six or seven months," he said before adding, "For me, it's like three!”

"It's that time when nothing matters with your lady because it's all good," Ritter continued. "And nothing gets you down, nothing at all." Wheeler later said the composition of the song is "About 96-beats-per-minute and it's in the key of C major."

== Reception ==
=== Critical reception ===
The song received mixed reviews from music critics. MTV compared the track to the band's previous singles "Swing, Swing" and "The Last Song", saying it "focused more on the good times, before the bad ones arose". Sputnikmusic commented saying "[The acoustic guitar] disrupts the mood of the chorus and ultimately, the entire song. The bridge is a bit of a minor key and is pretty catchy which saves some of the song. The piano outro is decent, but it doesn't fit with the rest of the song and therefore sounds bad."

=== Chart performance ===
Despite promotion, the song failed to chart in any territory.

== Music video ==
The music video for "Time Stands Still" was directed by Meiert Avis and shot in early August 2003 in Los Angeles and was released later that month. It revolves around lead vocalist and bassist of the band Tyson Ritter arriving for band rehearsals via Jeep at a warehouse where the other members are already practicing and performing the song.

The video also sees Ritter arrive at the warehouse at different points in time several times where his surroundings reverse back in time while he goes forward and seeing another version of himself rehearsing before merging into [that] version of him. Towards the end of the video, Ritter unmerges from himself as times goes backwards for him and his surroundings proceed forward, before ending back at the start of the video.

== Track listing ==
CD promo
No.	Title	Length
1.	"Time Stands Still"	3:30
2.	"Time Stands Still" (callout hook)	0:10

== Release history ==
Country	Date	Format	Label
United States	July 14, 2003	CD promo	Universal Music Group

== See also ==
- "Way Away", a 2003 song by another pop-punk band Yellowcard with the music video has similar premise.
- "Just Like You", a 2003 song by Canadian rock band Three Days Grace with the music video has similar premise.
