= Heartbeat Slowing Down =

Single by The All-American Rejects

from the album Kids in the Street
- Released: October 15, 2012
- Recorded: 2011
- Length: 4:44
- Label: DGC; Interscope
- Songwriters: Nick Wheeler; Tyson Ritter
- Producer: Greg Wells

The All-American Rejects singles chronology
"Kids in the Street" (2012)	"Heartbeat Slowing Down" (2012)	"There's a Place" (2015)

"Heartbeat Slowing Down" is a song by American rock band The All-American Rejects, released as the third and final single from their fourth studio album Kids in the Street on October 15, 2012.

== Background ==
"Heartbeat Slowing Down" was written by Nick Wheeler and Tyson Ritter. The band referred to the song as "The most powerful song [they] have ever written." British singer-songwriter Mika also provides choirboy vocals to the track.

Wheeler explained, "We had to push each other to think outside of the box and leave our comfort zone. Because we know how to write a catchy song. We could write a B-rate version of 'Gives You Hell' and 'Move Along', for 'Heartbeat's Slowing Down' we definitely pushed each other to really make this something special. And I do think it's the best song on the record." He later said in an interview with Artistdirect that the track "[Uproots] some feelings and it's kind of an apology to somebody in the past."

In an interview with zZounds.com, Ritter also said that the track is his favorite from Kids in the Street and that "It's sort of the bookmark of the record. It really is a turning point where this sort of grand sound comes out through this ballad that is a bleeding heart for the record. I think it's one of our greatest songs that we've ever written as a band."

== Music video ==
A teaser for the music video for "Heartbeat Slowing Down" was released via The All-American Rejects official YouTube channel on October 16, 2012. A lyric video was posted on the band's official YouTube channel on November 9, 2012. Since the release of the teaser, the video has not been released and is thought to have been scrapped.

== Track listing ==
Digital download

1. "Heartbeat Slowing Down" – 4:44
2. "Heartbeat Slowing Down" (Zak Waters remix) – 4:18

== Charts ==
Chart (2013)	Peak position
US Adult Pop Airplay (Billboard)	39

== Release history ==
Country	Date	Format	Label
United States	October 15, 2012	Mainstream radio	Interscope
United States	January 22, 2013	Zak Waters remix	Interscope
