= The Last Song (The All-American Rejects song) =

Single by The All-American Rejects

from the album The All-American Rejects
- Released: April 21, 2003
- Recorded: 2001
- Genre: Pop-punk; power pop; alternative rock
- Length: 5:00 (album version); 4:12 (edit)
- Label: DreamWorks; Doghouse
- Songwriters: Nick Wheeler; Tyson Ritter
- Producer: Tim O'Heir

The All-American Rejects singles chronology
| "Swing, Swing" (2002) | "The Last Song" (2003) | "Time Stands Still" (2003) |

Music video
- "The Last Song" on YouTube

"The Last Song" is a song by American rock band The All-American Rejects, released as the second single from their self-titled debut studio album on April 21, 2003.

== Background and composition ==
"The Last Song" was written by Nick Wheeler and Tyson Ritter. According to Ritter, after breaking up with his girlfriend, he "got inspired to write something that wasn't about an all-girl topic", he explained, "[it's] about leaving your town and making something of yourself. Every other song [on the band's self-titled debut] is about one girl, so to put a song on the album that wasn't about her, that made it a little extra special."

"The Last Song" begins with the sound of a radio in mid-tune, followed by a string arrangement that slips into a chugging guitar line with the help of an electronic segue. Ritter doesn't really know how or why he and Wheeler came up with the distinct structure that's unlike anything else on the album. "it just comes out of nowhere," and "when two songwriters get into the studio, you don't know what the hell is going to come out. It's just one of the many surprises, like stuttering electronic beats, flourishes of majestic organs and a dance-inspired thump, that pepper the album."

Ritter also commented that "The Last Song" is his favorite song off of the band's debut album.

== Reception ==
=== Critical reception ===
The song received mixed reviews from music critics. musicOMH stated "'The Last Song' is very much the slice of teen heartache that 'Swing, Swing' was. It lacks, however, the catchy hook or sing-along chorus. The band chug their way through a pop-punk ditty that simply won't match their previous success, and, unfortunately, that only fans will remember the track seems a distinct likelihood."

Rockfeedback rated the song 3 out of 5 stars and reviewed saying that the song is "convenient" and "[the band's] Pretty In Pink-soundtrack, signature-riffage is evident yet again on the Rejects' "The Last Song"; poppy, melodic, 80's fun, scattered with tales of rejection, break-up and sceptical self-analysis. This is four minutes of unstoppably lurching melodies and soppy, accompanying lyrics This may be the last thing I write for love' simply curdling the sickly sweet taste in your mouth. Another hit no doubt. CityLife describes the track as "About half way between Busted and Limp Bizkit on the "turn that bloody racket down" scale." and commented saying "After the slow, considered start it quickly descends into something much more apt for fans of the skate punk sound. But at the same time it manages to maintain a respectable feel."

=== Chart performance ===
"The Last Song" spent eight weeks on the Billboard Modern Rock Tracks chart in the United States from May 24 to July 12, 2003, as well as one week on the UK Singles Chart in November, 2003.

== Music video ==
The music video for "The Last Song" was directed by Charles Jensen and shot in April 2003 in Pasadena, California and was released the following month on May 13. It involves the band first driving around an abandoned city, then performing the song in the middle of the Rose Bowl Stadium without an audience. Shots of each band member - appearing to be enjoying the isolation - are overlapped through the video; lead guitarist Nick Wheeler is seen in a grocery store - roaming the aisles with a trolley and putting any food he can gain to it - and consuming some of the groceries, while rhythm guitarist Mike Kennerty and drummer Chris Gaylor leisure in a golf park in easy chairs with refreshments and lead vocalist and bassist Tyson Ritter ditches his car for a convertible and performs doughnuts in a parking lot. Towards the end of the video, people appear at the locations of where each band member is, all looking bewildered to what they are doing.

According to Ritter, the plot of the video is about "leaving home to encompass a much broader concept: the rest of the world leaving them. It's a dream come true for every child who's ever imagined they were the last ones on Earth. Without anyone to stop them."

"I race a car around like hell, and do doughnuts in the parking lot," he continues, "It's this badass car, like a '73 cherry-red convertible Ford Mustang. I couldn't believe it ... I got to tear ass in a hot rod. I worked with a stuntman, but my dad used to drag cars, so I know how to drive all right, so he just let me do what I want. It was crazy, man. I couldn't believe the DreamWorks reps let me do that, 'cause I was doing some crazy shit. It was awesome."

== Track listing ==
All tracks are written by Nick Wheeler and Tyson Ritter.

UK CD single
| No. | Title | Length |
|---|---|---|
| 1. | "The Last Song" (edit) | 4:12 |
| 2. | "Time Stands Still" (bedroom demo version) | 3:32 |
| 3. | "Why Worry" (bedroom demo version) | 5:17 |
| 4. | "The Last Song" (video) | 4:35 |

UK 7" vinyl
| No. | Title | Length |
|---|---|---|
| 1. | "The Last Song" (edit) (side A) | 4:12 |
| 2. | "Time Stands Still" (bedroom demo version) (side B) | 3:33 |

US CD promo
| No. | Title | Length |
|---|---|---|
| 1. | "The Last Song" (edit) | 4:10 |
| 2. | "The Last Song" (full-length version) | 4:23 |

UK CD promo
| No. | Title | Length |
|---|---|---|
| 1. | "The Last Song" (edit) | 4:12 |
| 2. | "The Last Song" (album version) | 5:00 |

== Charts and awards ==
=== Weekly charts ===
| Chart (2003) | Peak position |
|---|---|
| Scotland (OCC) | 71 |
| UK Singles (OCC) | 69 |
| US Alternative Airplay (Billboard) | 29 |

=== Awards ===
| Year | Awards ceremony | Award | Results |
|---|---|---|---|
| 2004 | Music Video Production Association | Best Pop Video | Nominated |

== Release history ==
| Region | Date | Format | Label |
|---|---|---|---|
| United States | April 21, 2003 | Modern rock radio | DreamWorks |
| United Kingdom | November 10, 2003 | CD single; 7" vinyl | DreamWorks |
