= Beekeeper's Daughter =

Single by The All-American Rejects

from the album Kids in the Street
- Released: January 31, 2012
- Recorded: 2011
- Genre: Alternative rock; power pop
- Length: 3:33
- Label: DGC; Interscope
- Songwriter(s): Nick Wheeler; Tyson Ritter
- Producer(s): Greg Wells

The All-American Rejects singles chronology
"I Wanna" (2009)	"Beekeeper's Daughter" (2012)	"Kids in the Street" (2012)

Music video
- "Beekeeper's Daughter" on YouTube

"Beekeeper's Daughter" is a song by American rock band the All-American Rejects, released as the lead single from their fourth studio album Kids in the Street on January 31, 2012.

== Background and composition ==
"Beekeeper's Daughter" was written by Nick Wheeler and Tyson Ritter, according to the latter, it captures a tumultuous time while Ritter was living in Los Angeles after wrapping two years of touring behind the band's 2008 album When the World Comes Down.

"'Beekeeper's Daughter' is a story about a guy who thinks he can get away with anything and always have a girl there waiting for him," Ritter says. "He never backs down from that opinion. At the end of it, he's even stronger and more snide and thinks he's invincible no matter what. He's an asshole, but at that point in my life, I was kind of an asshole. As we were making Kids in the Street, I went from that to being a completely humbled guy who's looking at his reflection saying, ‘Wow, what have I done?' It may make me not seem very likeable, but it was important that I be truthful and really open up on this album about what I've been through."

The song is a mid-tempo track blending pop and rock sounds in an infectious hook. Tyson sings expressively, backed up by a fun melody and an upbeat chorus "that gets stuck in your head." Ritter explained, "Music, somewhat ‘festive atmosphere’, fits well with the meaning of lyrics. The ending of the song is funny and original too!" Wheeler added how got to use a talk box on the track, "I'm surprised anybody let me do that," he notes, "but I got a talk box back on the radio, which is cool."

== Reception ==
The song received mixed reviews from music critics. Billboard stated "Although the lyrics fall in line with the Rejects' usual emotional sensitivities, the band's sound has moved from earlier, more driving tracks like "Swing, Swing" and "Move Along" to a glossier power-pop sound here. Ritter finds himself confused, facing a common "leave or stay" dilemma with his lover. But while the lyrics have Ritter searching for answers, the melodies confidently amble through the song's sugary hook. "Beekeeper's Daughter" may lack the raw, earnest energy of earlier Rejects work, but it's a fun and memorable romp that brings out the best of their pop side."

Stitched Sound were slightly more positive, saying "'Beekeeper's Daughter' has a feel-good vibe to it that has Tyson Ritter's unique, well crafted voice wonderfully meshed into the song. The lyrics “You’re a pretty little flower/ I’m a busy little bee” basically scream out adorable. Not to mention that the more orchestrated bridge leading into the chorus is extremely catchy and something we haven't heard from The All-American Rejects in the past." Clark Chronicle were also positive, saying "'Beekeeper's Daughter' is one of [the band's] most enjoyable and successful songs in comparison to their more serious songs from previous albums. The All-American Rejects have once again fulfilled their expectations with an upbeat, fun song that anyone can listen to."

== Music video ==
A music video for "Beekeeper's Daughter", directed by Isaac Rentz, was shot in late January 2012 and released on February 2 onto Vevo. It evolves around the band's front-man Tyson Ritter acting carefree while walking through a city after just being rejected by his girlfriend while various pedestrians - some dressed distinctively - take part in dance routines along his way. The video also features a cameo appearance from American singer and entertainer Wayne Newton.

=== Reception ===
Critically, Promo News said "Isaac Rentz delivers a touch of old Hollywood magic in his song-and-dance promo for All-American Rejects’ 'Beekeeper's Daughter'. With dancing construction workers, street muggers and camp cops, it's about as theatrical as you can get", while MTV described the video as "A big, buzzy clip, brimming with dancing she-devils, cheerleaders, cops, ticker tape, a mariachi band and Mr. Newton (to name just a few). And while everything in the video elicits a thrill, it's Newton's cameo that takes the cake."

"This was the first video where, when we got [the treatment], everyone said 'yes' and I said 'yes ... but could we please have some of this?' And I proceeded to sort of expel every fantastic idea I could think of," frontman Tyson Ritter explained. "From, like, a hipster fight - beards versus mustaches, a lot of plaid, had to be like 'West Side Story' - to some she-devils. Everything we could ever sort of think of for a video that was impractical is in this one. And the whole thing is floating on a through-line of a man walking through his day, experiencing every random encounter from every random walk of life," he continued. "And at the very end, there's a big parade with Wayne Newton."

== Appearances in popular culture ==
"Beekeeper's Daughter" is featured in an episode of American teen drama 90210, which also features an appearance of the band performing the song.

== Track listing ==
Digital download

- "Beekeeper's Daughter" - 3:33

== Charts ==
Chart (2012)	Peak position
Scotland (OCC)	96
UK Singles (Official Charts Company)	132
US Bubbling Under Hot 100 Singles (Billboard)	24
US Adult Pop Airplay (Billboard)	30
US Pop Airplay (Billboard)	38
US Rock Digital Songs (Billboard)	22

== Release history ==
Country	Date	Format	Label
United States	January 31, 2012	Digital download	Interscope
Worldwide	February 14, 2012	Digital download	Interscope
United Kingdom	March 26, 2012	Digital download	Polydor
