= Kids in the Street (The All-American Rejects album) =

Studio album by the All-American Rejects
- Released: March 26, 2012
- Recorded: April–June 2011
- Studio: The Village Recorder (Los Angeles, California); Rocket Carousel Studio (Los Angeles, Califiornia)
- Genre: Alternative rock; power pop
- Length: 43:12
- Label: DGC; Interscope
- Producer: Greg Wells

The All-American Rejects chronology
When the World Comes Down (2008)	Kids in the Street (2012)	Sweat EP (2017)

Singles from Kids in the Street
- 1. "Beekeeper's Daughter" Released: January 31, 2012; 2. "Kids in the Street" Released: March 13, 2012; 3. "Heartbeat Slowing Down" Released: October 15, 2012

Kids in the Street is the fourth studio album by American rock band the All-American Rejects, released March 26, 2012, by Interscope Records. It is their final studio album released on the label, and was their last studio album for 14 years.

== Composition and recording ==
The All-American Rejects began writing their fourth studio album in mid 2010. During this time the band's songwriters Nick Wheeler and Tyson Ritter went on numerous retreats to their secluded house in Chicago, a writing strategy used for their previous albums. Recording began in April 2011 and wrapped up in June, with mixing commencing the following August and concluding in early September.

"Self-discovery is such an important thing," lead vocalist and bassist Tyson Ritter explained, "I feel like in music you're a virtual Magellan as you discover new, vast territories, sonically and lyrically. If you're not discovering something new, you're not doing it right. I knew we needed to find a different place, and I guess in this accidental sort of...I don't know man, in the journey I found a different way and a new voice for our music and even a new voice for me to sing with."

During an interview with Billboard, Ritter says he had no idea he was going to experience so much life in the three years between the band's last record and this one. “I went from the floor to standing up, and I think the whole record reflects that thematically,” he continued that he acknowledged he fell quickly into an unintentional "a quarter-life crisis" with "women and excess, getting into trouble, pouring too much Jameson's into the ol' noggin, a lot of people I could've done without", he added, "Of course it was destructive, but it wasn't really intentional. I was just having fun. It WAS fun, and coming out of it...thank God for the piano. Really, the music helped me out of it through this cathartic experience of writing the songs."

“We started out having two songwriters, Nick [Wheeler] and I. We’ve always just put together collections of songs to compose a record. We would take writing trips, where we’d write five songs at once, in a house in Chicago. That’s been how our songs have seemed cohesive as records [in the past]. This record actually had a story. We realized we weren’t putting together a collection of songs for the first time, but we were actually putting together a record that told a story”, Ritter explained ""Our goal on this record was to push ourselves into making a sound that was original, beyond, I guess, the other records that we've created as far as not limiting ourselves to just the four-piece rock band instrumentation of two guitars, bass and drums," Ritter explains. "I think when we stepped up to a big wall of keyboards for the first time, I was just like a kid in a candy store."

"[The] music climate has changed so much for bands, especially bands with guitars in their hands... our contemporaries, our colleagues, have burnt themselves out, it seems," frontman Tyson Ritter told Billboard during an interview on the set of the music video shoot for "Beekeeper's Daughter". "The great thing about our position as a rock band on a major label, we've had this confused place for so long, that 10 years later, we're still sort of making people scratch their heads going, 'Why am I still loving this band?'" Wheeler added "We're still a rock band. There's still guitars all over this thing. We just found a few different ways to use them, different ways to make guitars not sound like guitars. The songs were there, so we had to take the time to experiment and use all our time and energy in the studio just figuring out how to paint this picture."

In an interview with AbsolutePunk regarding the sound of the album, rhythm guitarist Mike Kennerty stated "Pop radio is literally just pop music now. There’s no guitars to be found, so we kind of saw that coming. It’s a different place and we made a different record. It’s not like a singles record, it’s actually a record. That was our concentration from when we were recording. We knew we were making a fucking record. Fuck the normal system of singles and all that stuff. Obviously, it’s going to get worked by the label, but we wanted to make something we were proud of as a record, first and foremost, and we did that."

The entire album was produced by Grammy Award-nominated producer Greg Wells, who is known for his work with Adele, Katy Perry, and OneRepublic, among many others. "Greg was the first producer we've worked with who really spoke my language, which translated into the sound of the album," Ritter commented. "If you really want to know what Kids in the Street sounds like, it sounds like The All-American Rejects finally got their shit together and wrote a record that was going to keep them around."

== Promotion and release ==
During an interview with MTV in October 2011, Ritter confirmed that the band's fourth album will be released on February 7, 2012. "It’s going to be the year of the Rejects," he teased. "[Our album release] is going to coincide with the Mayan end of the world thing, so the last song you’ll die to will be one of ours."

The All-American Rejects later announced the title of their fourth album, Kids in the Street, on December 16, 2011, and that the album's release date had been pushed back to March 27, 2012. They later revealed that Kids in the Street would be released worldwide on March 26, 2012 and unveiled the cover art on February 6.

=== Singles ===
On December 3, 2011, the All-American Rejects shot a music video for the album's opening track "Someday's Gone" and offered it for free download two days later. The song was released as a promotional single for paid download on March 20, 2012.

The lead single "Beekeeper's Daughter" premiered in the American teen drama 90210 on January 31, 2012, and featured an appearance from the band as themselves playing the song, before being digitally released on the same day. A music video followed its release on February 2.

The title track of Kids in the Street was released as the album's second single on March 13, 2012 a music video followed its release on April 16. The band later released the track "Walk Over Me" as a promotional single, a music video followed its release on June 27, 2012.

The All-American Rejects confirmed in an interview with Fuse News in October 2012 that the song "Heartbeat Slowing Down" would be remixed and released as the next single off Kids in the Street, it premiered on mainstream radio in the United States on October 15. A teaser for the music video was released on October 16, 2012, via the band's official YouTube channel. Since the release of the teaser, the video has not been released and is thought to have been scrapped.

== Critical reception ==
Professional ratings
Aggregate scores
Source	Rating
Metacritic	62/100
Review scores
Source	Rating
AbsolutePunk	8/10
AllMusic	4/5 stars
Artistdirect	5/5 stars
Bloody Disgusting	8/10 stars
The Boston Phoenix	2/4 stars
Entertainment Weekly	B
Metromix	3.5/5 stars
Rolling Stone	3/5 stars
Sputnikmusic	3/5 stars
USA Today	3.5/4 stars

At Metacritic, which assigns a weighted average rating out of 100 to reviews from mainstream critics, the album received an average score of 62, based on 10 reviews, which indicates "generally favorable".

Alternative Press wrote in a preview, "With everything from freewheeling bar rock and funked-up pop to crystalline, nostalgic '80s rock and brush- and string-heavy jazz... it's easily their most ambitious - and praiseworthy - effort to date." Rolling Stone said the band is "still mining teenage dramatics for buoyant, chant-along tunes", but it admired the tracks "Bleed into Your Mind" and "Affection" as a sign of "cracking through [the band's] own arrested development".

Retailer HMV commented, "The band have matured their exuberant sound with a cohesive record that unfolds into a story. Big guitar hooks and soaring melodies still remain, alongside huge drums that bludgeon through sing-a-long choruses that the band are renowned for", while Big Cheese said, "there's a candid attitude to the jumpy beats of 'Beekeeper's Daughter' and a maturity to 'Fast and Slow'. Meanwhile, title track 'Kids in the Street' offers a synch-infused look at childhood naivety and the slow and lurid beats of 'Heartbeat Slowing Down' are seductive."

Artistdirect felt that the band had released "their best album yet... It's a rock record without any boundaries, just the way rock 'n' roll should be." Entertainment Weekly were more negative, saying that the album had "Too many tracks cloaked in unnecessary hoopla, suffocating the best songs' breezy sweetness that makes blasts of pure blissful oxygen like 'Someday's Gone' and 'Beekeeper's Daughter' extra satisfying, but like most internal battles, Kids in the Street ends in a stalemate", Bloody Disgusting stated, "Without a doubt, this record exhibits a much wider sphere of influence for the band. It seems to call on many differing areas of rock n' roll, which is especially inspiring for a pop-rock release such as this one. The sounds of ninety's garage, 60s style rock, and even ska are all present on the record, with some songs resembling the work of bands such as Jet and All Time Low" and that guitarist Nick Wheeler's skills were much more "dynamic" compared to the band's previous albums.

USA Today said "Three years after Gives You Hell, the All-American Rejects sound like somebody put them through hell instead." and that Kids in the Street "Works its way back to sanity" as the album proceeds, but praised the songs "Beekeeper's Daughter", "Kids in the Street" and "Affection" for their realism. AbsolutePunk stated that the album "has something for everyone" and is a mixture of the band's previous LPs and "It's this pacing and experimentation with time signatures that really make each track stand out."

Consequence of Sound called the album "uninspired, '80s-laced material, doomed to exile from Clear Channel for being spearheaded by a band whose following finally began dismissing PostSecret as the double-blind social networking pity party it became".

== Chart performance ==
The album debuted at number 18 on the US Billboard 200 chart, with 18,000 copies in its first-week of sales. It also debuted at number 34 on the UK Albums Chart, making it the band's highest-charting album there.

== Track listing ==
All tracks are written by Tyson Ritter and Nick Wheeler.

No.	Title	Length
1.	"Someday's Gone"	3:25
2.	"Beekeeper's Daughter"	3:33
3.	"Fast and Slow"	4:00
4.	"Heartbeat Slowing Down"	4:44
5.	"Walk Over Me"	3:59
6.	"Out the Door"	3:39
7.	"Kids in the Street"	4:45
8.	"Bleed Into Your Mind"	2:43
9.	"Gonzo"	5:06
10.	"Affection"	4:44
11.	"I for You"	2:34
Total length:		43:12

US deluxe edition bonus tracks
No.	Title	Length
12.	"Drown Next to Me"	6:52
13.	"Someday's Gone" (demo)	3:55
14.	"Bleed Into Your Mind" (demo)	2:42
15.	"Do Me Right" (demo)	3:35
Total length:		60:14

US iTunes deluxe edition / Australian / New Zealand / UK bonus tracks
No.	Title	Length
12.	"Drown Next to Me"	6:52
13.	"Someday's Gone" (demo)	3:55
14.	"Bleed Into Your Mind" (demo)	2:42
15.	"Do Me Right" (demo)	3:35
16.	"Kids in the Street" (demo)	4:53
Total length:		65:07

International bonus tracks
No.	Title	Length
12.	"Drown Next to Me"	6:52
13.	"Someday's Gone" (demo)	3:55
14.	"Bleed Into Your Mind" (demo)	2:42
15.	"Do Me Right" (demo)	3:35
16.	"Fast and Slow" (demo)	3:58
Total length:		64:14

Japanese bonus tracks
No.	Title	Length
12.	"Drown Next to Me"	6:52
13.	"Someday's Gone" (demo)	3:55
14.	"Bleed Into Your Mind" (demo)	2:42
15.	"Do Me Right" (demo)	3:35
16.	"Fast and Slow" (demo)	3:58
17.	"Gives You Hell" (live from the Roundhouse, London)	3:31
Total length:		67:45

UK iTunes bonus tracks
No.	Title	Length
12.	"Drown Next to Me"	6:52
13.	"Someday's Gone" (demo)	3:55
14.	"Bleed Into Your Mind" (demo)	2:42
15.	"Do Me Right" (demo)	3:35
16.	"Fast and Slow" (demo)	3:58
17.	"Kids in the Street" (demo)	4:53
18.	"Dirty Little Secret" (live Engine Room session)	3:27
19.	"Beekeeper's Daughter" (live Engine Room session)	3:33
20.	"Move Along" (live Engine Room session)	3:56
21.	"I for You" (live Engine Room Session)	2:29
Total length:		82:32

== Personnel ==
Credits adapted from booklet.

=== The All-American Rejects ===
- Tyson Ritter – vocals, bass guitar, piano, keyboards
- Nick Wheeler – lead guitar, programming, drum corp (track 4), additional percussion
- Mike Kennerty – rhythm guitar
- Chris Gaylor – drums, drum corp (track 4), additional percussion

=== Additional musicians ===
- Greg Wells – piano, keyboards, programming
- Alex Kandel – additional vocals
- Kevin Saulnier – piano (track 10)
- Willy Wells – bass (track 10), gang vocals (tracks 2, 6)
- Lenny Castro – percussion
- Audra Mae – additional vocals (tracks 2, 3, 7)
- Alex Kandel – additional vocals (track 1)
- MIKA – additional vocals (track 4)
- Elizaveta – additional vocals (track 8)
- Zack Ritter – additional vocals (track 2)
- Joel McNeely – orchestra arrangements
- Ron Blake – horns (track 1)
- Francisco Torres – horns (track 1)
- The All-American Rejects – gang vocals (tracks 2, 6)
- The Mac – gang vocals (tracks 2, 6)
- Julianne Lackey – gang vocals (tracks 2, 6)
- Nick Fishbaugh – gang vocals (tracks 2, 6)
- Sean Caragher – gang vocals (tracks: 2, 6)
- Florida – gang vocals (tracks: 2, 6)
- Jackie Petrie – gang vocals (tracks: 2, 6)
- Natalie Besharat – gang vocals (tracks 2, 6)

=== Production ===
- Greg Wells – production, mixing (tracks: 11, 12)
- Serban Ghenea – mixing
- Ian MacGregor – recording engineer
- Chris Owens – assistant recording engineer
- John Hanes – mixing engineer
- Phil Seaford – assistant mixing engineer
- Nick Wheeler – production (track 11)
- Jeremiah "Florida" Langdon – guitar tech
- John Oreshnick – drum tech
- Sean Caragher – monitor engineer

=== Design and cover art ===
- Jon Danovic – photography
- Brennan Maxwell – photography
- Jon Danovic – creative
- Ianthe Zevos – creative
- Mamelok Papercraft – mask design

== Charts ==
Chart performance for Kids in the Street
Chart (2012)	Peak position
Australian Albums (ARIA)	65
Canadian Albums (Nielsen SoundScan)	49
Irish Albums (IRMA)	87
Japanese Albums (Oricon)	120
Scottish Albums (OCC)	34
UK Albums (OCC)	34
US Billboard 200	18
US Top Alternative Albums (Billboard)	8
US Top Rock Albums (Billboard)	10
US Top Tastemaker Albums (Billboard)	5

== Release history ==
Release dates and formats for Kids in the Street
Country	Date	Format	Label
Australia	March 26, 2012	CD; digital download	DGC; Interscope
Canada	March 26, 2012	CD; digital download	DGC; Interscope
Europe	March 26, 2012	CD; digital download	DGC; Interscope
New Zealand	March 26, 2012	CD; digital download	DGC; Interscope
United Kingdom	March 26, 2012	CD; digital download	Polydor
United States	March 26, 2012	CD; digital download	DGC; Interscope
United Kingdom	May 1, 2012	12" vinyl	Polydor
United States	May 1, 2012	12" vinyl	DGC; Interscope
