= Sean McConnell =

American singer-songwriter

- Origin: Athol, Massachusetts
- Genres: Country; folk; roots music
- Occupation: Singer-songwriter
- Instruments: Vocals; guitar
- Years active: 2000–present
- Labels: Rounder

Sean McConnell is an American folk and country singer-songwriter.

== Biography ==
McConnell was born in Athol, Massachusetts to two folk singers who played in local venues in the Boston area. His family moved to Georgia when he was eleven years old, and while there he began playing guitar and writing his own songs. McConnell attended Middle Tennessee State University in Murfreesboro, Tennessee, where he performed regionally and continued songwriting.

McConnell released his debut album on his own label in 2000, when he was 15 years old, and went on to self-issue five more full-lengths and three EPs between 2003 and 2014. Concomitantly with this, McConnell entered into a publishing deal with Warner-Chappell, writing songs for artists such as Meat Loaf, Tim McGraw, Martina McBride, Buddy Miller, David Nail, Rascal Flatts, Jason Castro, Scotty McCreery, Jimmy Wayne, Phil Stacey, Brothers Osborne, Plain White T's, Eli Young Band, and Brad Paisley, as well as for the television show Nashville.

McConnell's releases under his own name, including the 2009 album Saints, Thieves, Liars, drew the attention of the Texas red dirt music scene while he was still living in Nashville. McConnell wrote songs for, and performed on the albums of, Texas musicians Wade Bowen and the Randy Rogers Band, and opened for Bowen on a nationwide tour.

McConnell signed with Rounder Records in 2016, and a self-titled album, the first not released on his own imprint, was released in July of that year. The album was produced by Ian Fitchuk and Jason Lehning.

== Discography ==
Albums

- Here in the Lost and Found (2000)
- 200 Orange St (2003)
- Faces (2005)
- Cold Black Sky (2006)
- Saints, Thieves, Liars (2009)
- Midland (2012)
- Sean McConnell (2016)
- Undone (2017)
- Secondhand Smoke (2019)
- A Horrible Beautiful Dream (2021)
- Skin (2025)

EPs

- Tell The Truth (2007)
- The Walk Around (2009)
- The B-Side Session (2014)
