= Kids in the Street (song) =

Single by The All-American Rejects

from the album Kids in the Street
- Released: March 13, 2012
- Recorded: 2011
- Genre: Alternative rock; power pop
- Length: 4:46
- Label: DGC; Interscope
- Songwriters: Nick Wheeler; Tyson Ritter
- Producer: Greg Wells

The All-American Rejects singles chronology
"Beekeeper's Daughter" (2012)	"Kids in the Street" (2012)	"Heartbeat Slowing Down" (2012)

Music video
- "Kids in the Street" on YouTube

"Kids in the Street" is a song by American rock band The All-American Rejects, released as the second single from their fourth studio album of the same name on March 13, 2012.

== Background ==
"Kids in the Street" was written by Nick Wheeler and Tyson Ritter. In a "track-by-track" video showing the band talking about each song from their fourth studio album, Ritter says, "This song is the theme of the record. It's this callback to a moment in your life where you were so dumb, but so smart at the same time. The candle of naivety was burning down like that, but the candle of cynicism was yet to be lit."

== Reception ==
The song received generally positive reviews from music critics. Bloody Disgusting reviewed the track as "Immediately catchy" and that it "Makes great use of synth riffs and nostalgic imagery", while Pop Crush said "The Rejects offer a nostalgic look back to a more innocent time on "Kids in the Street" - the ambitious, nearly five-minute-long song presents a frenetic pop beat paired with loopy synths created during a day of experimentation in the studio." Rock NYC posted a review saying "The All-American Rejects are back with their poppy good fun. Although sporting a weird accent the song is contagious and twittery."

Homeless Tracks said "The song is similar in tone to "Beekeeper's Daughter", in that it is darker than previously released music by the group. "Kids in the Street" features complicated drum rhythms inspired by a Garage-band loop, dominant synths, and electric guitars. The vocals feel somewhat subdued, but the instrumentation is more than ambitious enough to account for that. The disparity between vocals and instruments can create a level of frustration for the listener, however, although this tension actually adds a lot to the song", While Artistdirect quoted "The band hits a timeless chord on the standout title track. Over a hulking beat from drummer Chris Gaylor, Ritter paints a whimsical picture of childhood memories back when you could be a real kid in the street. All of the elements converge for a cinematic love letter to better days."

== Music video ==
A music video for "Kids in the Street", directed by Jon Danovic, was shot in February 2012 and released April 16 onto Vevo. It revolves around younger versions of each band member attending a house party as the video shows their nostalgic time and expediences while present (possibly based on true events) as well as The All-American Rejects themselves in real-time age performing the song with glow-in-the-dark instruments in a small, dimly-lit room.

=== Reception ===
Elliott Batte, writing for Stereoboard, said, "The video captures the theme of the album, which the band describes as 'lyrically and musically nostalgic', and stars younger versions of the band members themselves and features a classic no-holds-barred performance from the multi-platinum group in a surrealistic, neon, windswept vision of their past."

== Track listing ==
Digital download

- "Kids in the Street" - 4:46

== Release history ==
Country	Date	Format	Label
United States	March 13, 2012	Digital download	Interscope
