= Swing, Swing =

2002 single by the All-American Rejects

Single by the All-American Rejects

from the album The All-American Rejects
- Released: November 25, 2002
- Genre: Emo; pop-punk; power pop; alternative rock
- Length: 3:53
- Label: DreamWorks; Doghouse
- Songwriters: Nick Wheeler; Tyson Ritter
- Producer: Tim O'Heir

The All-American Rejects singles chronology
"Swing, Swing" (2002)	"The Last Song" (2003)

Music video
- "Swing, Swing" on YouTube

"Swing, Swing" is a song by American rock band the All-American Rejects, released as their debut single from their self-titled debut studio album on November 25, 2002. The song peaked at number 60 on the US Billboard Hot 100, number eight on the Billboard Modern Rock Tracks chart, and number 13 on the UK Singles Chart.

== Background ==
"Swing, Swing" was written by Nick Wheeler and Tyson Ritter. According to Ritter, the song was written in his grandparents' cabin in his hometown of Stillwater in Oklahoma when he came up with the chorus one weekend morning. "My ex-girlfriend and I had a rough relationship, and that was written when it sucked real bad," Ritter explained, "I liked this other chick, so that's what the second verse is about, moving on to a hotter chick - no I'm just kidding. Moving on to another girl... or just moving on."

The song was also one of the last to be written and recorded for the duo's self titled debut album "It was over and done with a year ago," Ritter said of the misery-inducing relationship that also inspired many other tear-jerking pop songs, such as "My Paper Heart" and "Don't Leave Me." "But I got a great record out of it... as far as lyrics. I didn't have to think too hard."

== Reception ==
=== Critical reception ===
The song received generally positive reviews from music critics. Rockfeedback, who rated the track 3 out of 5 stars, reviewed the song as "Very polished, insanely catchy, and heart-on-sleeve this record is. Dramatically expressive lyrics ('Did you think that I would cry, on the phone...?', 'My heart is crushed by a former love!'), ultra-glossy production and a ridiculously infectious chorus: you wouldn't bet against them." Contactmusic.com said "The melody is appealing and its pop punk sounds like something from Simple Plan or Blink 182. The lyrics are slightly baffling with 'swing, swing, swing from the tangles of' - a classic example."

MusicOMH regarded "Swing, Swing" as "top form" and commented with "These small-town American, fun rockers are hard to dislike. Swing Swing swings along pleasantly enough, developing from an organ intro to a good-natured, old-style rock out that does just what you expect it to. Rock, that is", while City Life praised the track as "imaginative" and that "The use of a church organ gives way to a totally catchy - if formulaic - college rock anthem. Vocals are typically American high-pitched angst, while the simple "Swing-Swing" chorus should guarantee favourable radio play on both sides of the Atlantic."

=== Chart performance ===
Upon release, "Swing, Swing" gained attention on Los Angeles modern rock radio station KROQ-FM and WXRK in New York City. When The All-American Rejects was re-released in early 2003, "Swing, Swing" gained more commercial success; peaking at number eight on the US Billboard Modern Rock Tracks chart, number 60 on the US Billboard Hot 100, and number 13 on the UK Singles Chart. It is the band's highest-charting single in the UK. "Swing, Swing" was digitally released in 2005, reaching number 75 on the Billboard Hot Digital Songs chart. It also briefly returned to the UK Singles Chart in April 2009 at number 99.

== Music video ==
The music video for "Swing, Swing" was directed by Marcos Siega. It involves the band performing the song in a small trailer park while scenes of a young couple going through their relationship are overlapped through the video - eventually ending with them breaking up.

== Awards ==
Year	Awards ceremony	Award	Results
2003	MTV Video Music Award	Best New Artist	Nominated

== Track listing ==
All tracks are written by the All-American Rejects.

CD single
No.	Title	Length
1.	"Swing, Swing" (album version)	3:54
2.	"The Cigarette Song" (acoustic version)	3:36
3.	"Too Far Gone" (bedroom demo version)	4:02
4.	"Swing, Swing" (music video)	3:29

7-inch vinyl
No.	Title	Length
1.	"Swing, Swing" (side A)	3:54
2.	"Too Far Gone" (bedroom demo version) (side B)	4:02

== Charts ==
=== Weekly charts ===
Chart (2003)	Peak position
Australia Hitseekers (ARIA)	16
Europe (Eurochart Hot 100)	43
Scottish Singles Sales (Official Charts)	10
UK Singles (Official Charts)	13
US Billboard Hot 100	60
US Mainstream Top 40 (Billboard)	17
US Modern Rock Tracks (Billboard)	8
US Top 40 Tracks (Billboard)	30

Chart (2009)	Peak position
UK Singles (Official Charts)	99

=== Year-end charts ===
Chart (2003)	Position
US Mainstream Top 40 (Billboard)	68
US Modern Rock Tracks (Billboard)	29

== Certifications ==
Region	Certification	Certified units/sales
United Kingdom (BPI)	Silver	200,000^{‡}
^{‡} Sales+streaming figures based on certification alone.

== Release history ==
Region	Date	Format(s)	Label(s)	Ref.
United States	November 25, 2002	Alternative radio	DreamWorks; Doghouse	
United States	March 17, 2003	Contemporary hit radio	DreamWorks; Doghouse	
United States	March 24, 2003	Hot adult contemporary radio	DreamWorks; Doghouse	
Australia	April 28, 2003	CD	DreamWorks; Doghouse	
United Kingdom	July 21, 2003	7-inch vinyl; CD	DreamWorks; Doghouse	
