= Jesus East =

Studio album by Black Cab
- Released: 2006
- Genre: Indie rock
- Length: 47:10
- Label: Interstate 40 Music
- Producer: Magoo

Black Cab chronology
| Altamont Diary (2004) | Jesus East (2006) | Call Signs (2009) |

Professional ratings
Review scores
| Source | Rating |
|---|---|
| The Age | 3.5/5 stars |
| The Sunday Age | 4/5 stars |
| Sydney Morning Herald | 4/5 stars |

Jesus East is the second album by Melbourne electronica band Black Cab, released in 2006. The album was described as "sitar-drenched, blending Indian instruments (looped and droning) with driving rock’n’roll and country guitar stylings".

Band member Andrew Coates explained: "The album's two musical signposts are the Beatles' sitar-drenched "Tomorrow Never Knows" and German Krautrock duo Neu!. We kind of had this theme which was George Harrison goes to an ashram in India and comes back to Germany via the autobahn. It really was the rough idea of what we were trying to do music-wise, and everything came from there."

The album included a spoken-word section by former Rolling Stones tour manager Sam Cutler, whose voice had also appeared on the band's previous album, Altamont Diary in soundbites taken from a documentary film about the ill-fated 1969 free concert at Altamont Speedway in California headlined by the Stones.

"You have to remember we were 'celebrating' the biggest bummer of his life, a period he’d consigned to history," band member Andrew Coates told the mess+noise website. "But he was coming down to Victoria for the Rainbow Serpent festival so we arranged to meet up." Cutler agreed to contribute a spoken-word piece to the Jesus East album, which was then in production.

"It was like a bad interview," guitarist James Lee recalled. "We were coaxing him, but it was going nowhere. So we put the backing track loops on, gave him the mic again, and he did it all in one take." Mess+noise reported: "The result was 'Valiant', the second-last track on Jesus East. In it, Cutler—now in his mid-60s—reminisces about the glory days of the Grateful Dead entourage (famously known as 'Deadheads'): their unity, sense of shared spirit and open-mindedness. He also expresses his disillusion about today’s music scene. 'Nowadays, it doesn’t feel to me like there’s that community of spirit when I go to music shows. For a start, everyone’s doing different drugs,' he laments. Towards the end of the piece Cutler advises 'young people today' to 'go for what is real ... look at your own heart and your own spirit ... follow your own master'. The song polarises Cab fans, says Coates. 'Some people really hate that song, some geezer raving about the Grateful Dead ... They’re like, 'Who is he?' "

== Track listing ==
(all songs by Andrew Coates, James Lee)

1. "Hearts on Fire" — 6:09
2. "Jesus East" — 4:14
3. "Another Sun" — 5:27
4. "Underground Star" — 3:18
5. "13 Days" — 6:34
6. "Surrender" — 4:08
7. "Randy Sez" — 1:57
8. "Simple Plan" — 3:24
9. "Valiant" — 7:02
10. "The Path" — 4:51

== Personnel ==
- James Lee — guitars
- Andrew Coates — vocals, arrangements, programming

=== Additional musicians ===
- Anthony Paine — bass
- Richard Andrew — drums
- Alex Jarvis — guitars
- Ashley Naylor —guitars
- Steve Law — keys
- Sam Cutler — spoken word ("Valiant")
- Hermant Kumar — tablas
- Rudhey Gupta — sitar
- Sayaka Yabuki — vocals ("13 Days")
