= Ronnie Schneider =

American music manager (1943–2023)

Ronald Schneider
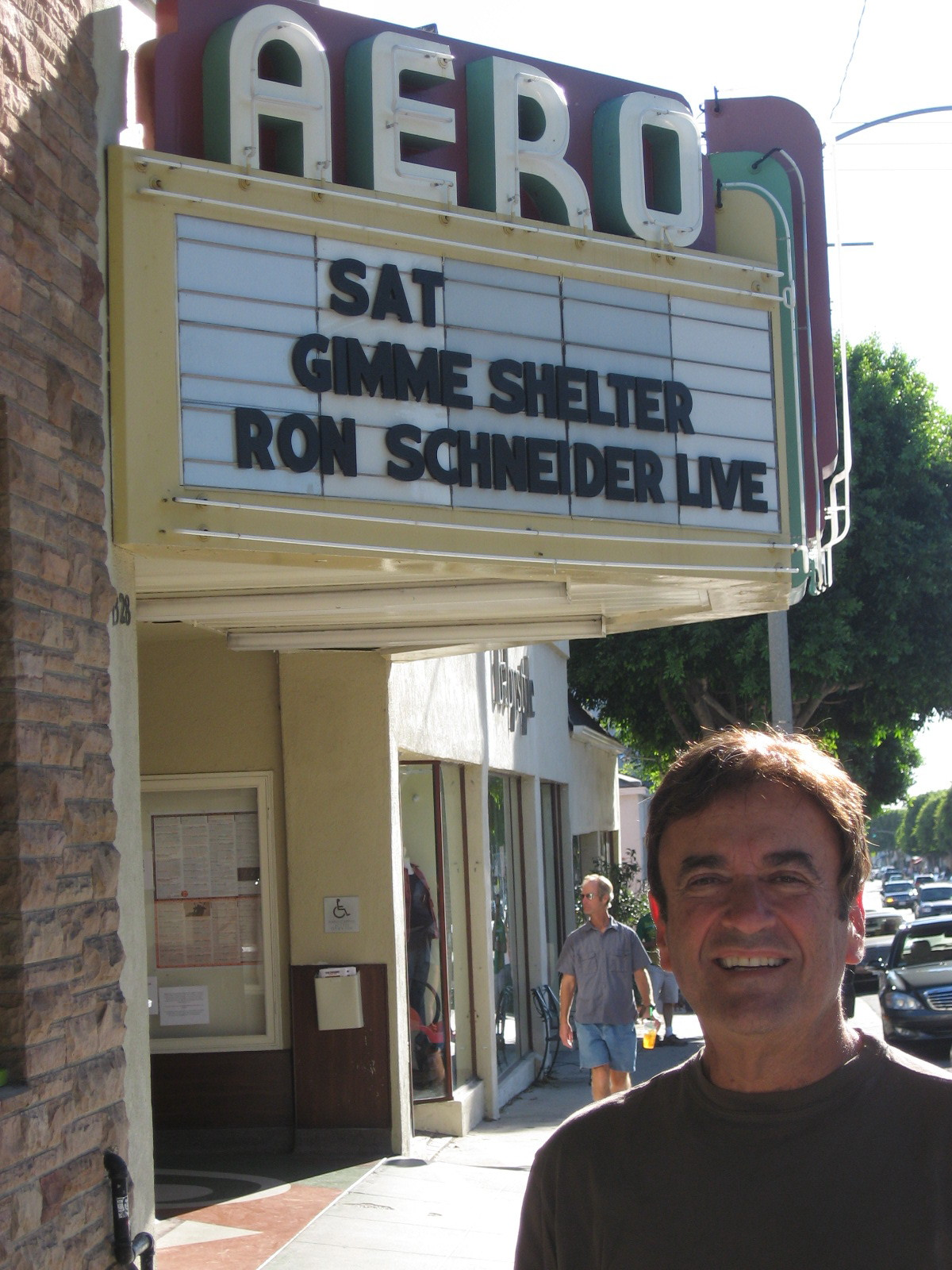
- Schneider at a screening of Gimme Shelter in 2007

Background information
- Born: October 20, 1943; Newark, New Jersey, U.S.
- Died: October 15, 2023 (aged 79) Los Angeles, California, U.S.
- Genre: Rock music
- Occupations: Business manager, producer, web developer
- Years active: 1965-2023
- Label: ABKCO
- Website: meandtherollingstones.com

Ronald Schneider (October 20, 1943 – October 15, 2023) is best known for being the business presence at the center of pivotal 1960s events including the Altamont Free Concert, the dissolution of The Beatles and the reorganization of their business arm, Apple Corps. Schneider managed the early US tours of The Rolling Stones while simultaneously dealing with the financial affairs of some of the biggest names in Rock and Roll history including the Stones, the Beatles, Neil Sedaka, Sam Cooke, Nancy Wilson, Bobby Vinton, Herman's Hermits and The Shirelles.

== Early life and career ==
Schneider’s family moved to Miami when he was seven, and spent his formative years there. He attended the University of Miami, where he majored in business.

Schneider is the nephew of Allen Klein, the entertainment accountant whose clients included some of the biggest names in popular music at the time. On the advice of his mother, Schneider drove to New York City on his summer breaks from college and interned at his "Uncle Allen's" business, ABKCO Records. His first contact with his Uncle's client-base came when he was assigned to work with Sam Cooke and Bobby Vinton.

Following his graduation from the University of Miami in 1965, Schneider returned to New York and met The Rolling Stones on a press cruise around Manhattan organized by Klein's company. After a lunch meeting, Klein told Schneider that he wanted someone to accompany the Rolling Stones on tour to represent the Klein Company at the box office. Schneider, who had just a few months earlier been dancing to this new song, "Satisfaction" in Miami clubs, was now to be "on the road" with The Rolling Stones and collecting the receipts at the box office on behalf of Klein.

== Rock and roll management ==
Schneider assumed the responsibility for managing the tour finances for The Rolling Stones USA tour, establishing a working relationship that resulted in his handling the next tour in 1966, and eventually, in 1969, taking over sole responsibility for The Rolling Stones' 1969 USA Tour after Klein was fired by the Stones organization. Schneider also managed the Stones European Tour in 1970. Klein was, according to Sam Cutler’s 2008 memoir unceremoniously fired by Keith Richards and Road Manager Sam Cutler in 1969 on Mick Jagger's orders, Jagger being occupied with the filming of the Ned Kelly in Australia at the time.

== New business model for touring bands ==
Prior to the 1969 tour, the local promoters paid the touring bands a flat fee and then brought in their local talent plus talent they managed to complete the show. The Rolling Stones told Schneider that for this tour they wanted to put on the entire production and bring a complete music package to their fans. Neither Schneider nor the Stones had any money at the time to fund this endeavor so Schneider had to come up with a new business model and that meant the band getting a piece of the gross box office and demanding a 50% advance, which funded the shows.

Schneider’s role involved securing box office receipts on behalf of the band. In this way, the band itself (and Schneider, whose interests were aligned with those of the band) was in control of all the money related to a tour. On behalf of the Rolling Stones, Schneider centralized the control, ownership and management of ancillary rights, licensing and the marketing of posters, T-shirts, programs and other concert related materials—-vastly improving the group’s revenue base while touring.

The Rolling Stones were perhaps the most financially successful band at that time largely due to Schneider’s efforts to "professionalize" and gain control (on behalf of himself and the band, as an equity partner of the band) of the financial affairs of their tour. This model was later copied by many acts, and set the stage for the big money stadium shows of the 1970s and 1980s.

Prior to the Stones 1969 US tour, Schneider was occupied executing the orders of his Uncle Allen in the reorganization of The Beatles’ Apple Corps. While Klein made all of the headlines, Schneider was the Klein Company representative on the ground working with the Beatles to get costs and income under control—but was often mistaken by the media for his uncle.

== Altamont, producing Gimme Shelter ==
Acting on behalf of The Rolling Stones, Schneider hired the Maysles Brothers to film The Rolling Stones' Madison Square Garden Concert for promotional purposes. This led to filming the free outdoor concert The Rolling Stones gave at the Altamont Raceway Park in Northern California in early December 1969 which became the film Gimme Shelter for which Schneider was credited as executive producer. This acclaimed concert documentary horrified participants and viewers alike. Capturing the scene of a man (Meredith Hunter) brutally stabbed to death by the Hells Angels, it remains one of the most successful concert films ever made. Schneider also appears in several key scenes in the movie, negotiating the choice of location for the concert, attempting to get adequate security for the show, and notably, escaping by helicopter with The Rolling Stones as the scene spun out of control.

== Other movies ==
Prior to producing Gimme Shelter, Schneider worked on behalf of ABKCO and Klein to produce the Herman's Hermits movie Mrs. Brown, You've Got a Lovely Daughter (1968) based on the group's hit song. For Metro-Goldwyn-Mayer, Schneider produced Spaghetti Westerns including The Silent Stranger (1968) and independently, Get Mean (1975).

== Later life and career ==
In 1974, Schneider founded the American Concert Association, a corporation that brought to colleges top rock acts like Richie Havens, Steppenwolf and Sly and the Family Stone.

In 1987, Schneider acted as associate producer for the Cinemax Sessions specials featuring jazz greats Sarah Vaughan, Dizzy Gillespie, Herbie Hancock, Chuck Mangione, Don Cherry and Maynard Ferguson.

From 1988 to 1995, he was involved in various film productions and mentored promising artists through his company Eurolink, maintaining offices in London, Berlin, Vienna and Prague.

In 1995, he built a website for the only store in the United States that represented the Louvre and other prominent French Museums—"La Boutique Musee". From here, he established relationships with computer programming talent from Netscape, Silicon Graphics, Sony, Silicon Reef and independent computer animation specialist and database/search engine creators.

In 1997, he was the executive producer of a television pilot for children Kidazzle which made use of children’s energy. "Transforming fighting into thinking".

In 1998, Schneider completed negotiations for one of his musicians to perform on the soundtrack of The Thin Red Line, a film starring John Travolta and Sean Penn.

Through 1999, Schneider built the website for Yearsyounger Homeopathic Products. He also performed consulting services concerning Y2K for The Arlington Institute, a think tank representing the US government in Arlington County, Virginia as well as consulting services for Oasis TV, and Treat Entertainment/Anderson Publishing (Wal-Mart affiliate).

2000 - Comptroller executive for Pentagon, Inc., the Internet presence for Virgin Megastores.

2001 - On going financial consulting for entertainment business endeavors. Co-Founder of The Exchange, an entertainment networking group of over 300 members.

Presently — Published memoir: Out of Our Heads, The Rolling Stones, The Beatles and Me.

died on October 15, 2023 in Los Angeles, California, five days before his 80th birthday.
