= Baird Bryant =

American filmmaker (1927–2008)

- Born: December 12, 1927; Columbus, Indiana
- Died: November 13, 2008 (aged 80); Hemet, California
- Education: Deep Springs College; Harvard University
- Occupation: Filmmaker
- Parent(s): Dr. William Bryant, Daisy née Mortimer

Wenzell Baird Bryant (December 12, 1927 – November 13, 2008) was an American filmmaker. He was well known in documentary circles for his hand-held ability to almost instantaneously capture live action as it was happening. Hired as the cameraman on Gimme Shelter, the Albert and David Maysles film of The Rolling Stones 1969 American Tour, Baird caught on camera the fatal stabbing of concertgoer Meredith Hunter by Hells Angels member Alan Passaro at the Altamont Free Concert in December 1969.

== Biography ==
Born in Columbus, Indiana, his parents were Dr. William Bryant, a surgeon, and Daisy née Mortimer. On his mother's side, he is a descendant of the Revolutionary War patriot Famous Mortimer and also of the Revolutionary War heroine Charlotte Est Wenzell.

Bryant attended Deep Springs College in Big Pine, California, and graduated from Harvard University. In the 1950s, he lived in Paris and was a writer, living with William S. Burroughs, Allen Ginsberg and Jack Kerouac. Bryant wrote Play This Love with Me (1955). Fluent in French, he also wrote the first English translation of Pauline Réage's erotic novel Story of O.

He began his filmmaking career in the early 1960s shooting The Seducers (1962), Greenwich Village Story (1963), The Cool World (1963) and Celebration at Big Sur (1971).

Bryant worked on Easy Rider in late February 1968 as part of the first crew that was hastily assembled to cover Mardi Gras in New Orleans with several 16 mm film hand-held cameras. He filmed the famous LSD scene with Peter Fonda on a statue in a cemetery. On account of the behaviour of Dennis Hopper, filming was "chaotic" at that point, and several of the crew had quit. "I showed up with my camera, and nobody else was there." A new crew was hired for the production of the road movie on 35 mm movie film.

He also worked on the Academy Award-winning film Broken Rainbow (1985), a documentary about the Navajo, and Heart of Tibet (1991), a film about the Dalai Lama. He was a practicing Tibetan Buddhist, and followed Chögyam Trungpa when he introduced Tibetan Buddhism to the west in Boulder, Colorado.

Bryant died at the age of 80 in Hemet, California, on November 13, 2008.
