= Gimme Shelter (1970 film) =

American documentary

- Original film poster
- Directed by: Albert and David Maysles; Charlotte Zwerin
- Produced by: Porter Bibb
- Starring: The Rolling Stones
- Cinematography: Albert and David Maysles
- Edited by: Ellen Hovde; Charlotte Zwerin
- Production companies: Maysles Films; Penforta
- Distributed by: Cinema V (United States and Canada); 20th Century Fox (International)
- Release date: December 6, 1970
- Running time: 91 minutes
- Country: United States
- Language: English
- Box office: $1.6 million

Gimme Shelter is a 1970 American documentary film directed by Albert and David Maysles and Charlotte Zwerin chronicling the last weeks of the Rolling Stones' 1969 US tour which culminated in the disastrous Altamont Free Concert and the killing of Meredith Hunter. The film is named after "Gimme Shelter", the lead track from the group's 1969 album Let It Bleed. Gimme Shelter was screened out of competition as the opening film of the 1971 Cannes Film Festival.

== Context ==
This counterculture era documentary is associated with the Direct Cinema movement of the 1950s and 1960s. It was directed by the Maysles Brothers who are strong figures of the era, as well as Charlotte Zwerin. The movement revolves around the philosophy of being a "reactive" filmmaker, recording events as they unfold naturally and spontaneously rather than investigating the subject matter through documentary techniques such as interviews, reconstruction and voiceover.

== Production ==
The film depicts some of the Madison Square Garden concert later featured on the 1970 live album, Get Yer Ya-Ya's Out! The Rolling Stones in Concert, as well as Charlie Watts and a donkey filmed on the M6 motorway near Birmingham, England during a photography session for the album cover. It also shows the Stones at work in Muscle Shoals, Alabama recording "Brown Sugar" and "Wild Horses", and footage of Ike and Tina Turner opening for the Stones at their Madison Square Garden concert, to Mick Jagger's comment, "It's nice to have a chick occasionally."

The Maysles brothers were selected by tour manager Ronnie Schneider (nephew of ABCKO's Allen Klein) on the recommendation of cameraman Haskell Wexler, after DA Pennebaker/Richard Leacock (Bob Dylan's Don't Look Back), then Robert Downey, Sr. were approached but found to be unavailable. The Maysles joined the tour at the Baltimore date to plan their filming strategy for the 3 New York shows planned to end the tour on November 27 and 28.

The original agreement was for 30–45 minutes of footage for a possible TV special that evolved as the band agreed to appear at a festival in West Palm Beach on the 30th. They then committed to play the free San Francisco show the following weekend and use the days in between to record at Muscle Shoals studios in Alabama. The Maysles agreed to continue filming and extend the TV special to 60 minutes. In the week after Altamont, they realized that a cameraman had unwittingly captured the stabbing of Meredith Hunter by Hells Angel Alan Passaro. The city of San Francisco agreed to drop any potential charges against the band in exchange for a copy of the footage and charged Passaro with murder. He was later acquitted by jurors who saw Hunter, whose autopsy revealed methamphetamine in his blood, as the aggressor. It was on the flight to deliver the film that a deal was struck to develop a movie for theatrical release.

Much of the film chronicles the behind-the-scenes deal-making that took place to make the free Altamont concert happen, including much footage of well-known attorney Melvin Belli negotiating by telephone with the management of the Altamont Speedway. The movie also includes a playback of Hells Angels leader Ralph "Sonny" Barger's famous call-in to radio station KSAN's "day after" program about the concert, wherein he recalls, "They told me if I could sit on the edge of the stage so nobody could climb over me, I could drink beer until the show was over."

=== Altamont Free Concert ===
The focus then turns to the 1969 concert itself at the Altamont Speedway, the security for which was provided by the Hells Angels (armed with pool cues). As the day progresses, with drug-taking and drinking by the Angels and members of the audience, the mood turns ugly. Fights break out during performances by the Flying Burrito Brothers and Jefferson Airplane; Grace Slick pleads with the crowd to settle down. When Mick Jagger arrives to the grounds via helicopter, he is punched in the face by an unruly fan while making his way to his trailer.

At one point, Jefferson Airplane lead male singer Marty Balin is knocked out by a Hells Angel; Paul Kantner attempts to confront "the people who hit my lead singer" in response, announcing: "Hey, man, I'd like to mention that the Hells Angels just smashed Marty Balin in the face, and knocked him out for a bit. I'd like to thank you for that." Hells Angel "Sweet William" Fritsch, sitting on stage, grabs a microphone and replies: "You're talking to my people. Let me tell you what's happening. You, man, you are what's happening!" Slick herself warns the Angels after they continue hitting people: "You don't hassle with anybody in particular. You gotta keep your bodies off each other unless you intend love. People get weird, and you need people like the Angels to keep people in line. But the Angels also— You know, you don't bust people in the head for nothing. So both sides are fucking up temporarily; let's not keep fucking up!" Jerry Garcia and Phil Lesh arrive, but the Grateful Dead opt not to play after learning of the incident with Balin from Santana drummer Michael Shrieve. (Santana and Crosby, Stills, Nash, and Young also performed at the concert but are not shown in the movie.)

The Stones are shown appearing onstage that evening and perform "Sympathy for the Devil" as the tension continues to build. During the next song, "Under My Thumb", a member of the audience, 18-year-old Meredith Hunter, attempted, with other crowd members, to force his way onto the stage, and as a result was struck by the Hells Angels guarding the band. Hunter then drew a revolver before being attacked by Hells Angel Alan Passaro and was killed by at least six stab wounds. Hunter's stabbing was captured on film by at least one of the many camera operators filming the documentary, and appeared in the final cut of the film. According to Albert Maysles, the stabbing was filmed by Baird Bryant; other sources have also credited Eric Saarinen. The film sequence clearly shows the dark silhouette of a handgun in Hunter's hand against the crocheted vest of his girlfriend, Patty Bredehoft, as Passaro enters from the right, grabs and raises Hunter's gun hand, turns Hunter around, and stabs him at least twice in the back before pushing Hunter off camera.

The credited camera operators for Altamont included a young George Lucas. At the concert, Lucas' camera jammed after shooting about two and a half minutes of film. None of his footage was incorporated into the final cut.

== Critical reception ==
The Monthly Film Bulletin wrote:

A film of appalling confusion, in which even the songs have been so erratically recorded in sixteen-track stereo that Jagger's words offer little intelligibility ... Rather, as many of the people at Altamont must have felt at the time, it is Woodstock through distorting mirrors, a vision of darkness descending on a society intent on self-destruction. Somewhat unfairly, Gimme Shelter shows the Stones more as instigators than as commentators: Jagger's characteristic strutting at Madison Square Garden, his elbows flapping like the wings of a chicken, seems unfortunately to preface his curious costume at Altamont – the finery of a court jester whose jokes have started going too far. The balance is only partially restored by the Maysles' own footage of Jagger and Charlie Watts staring through hooded eyes at the screen of the editing bench, squirming with the rest of us. For them too, Altamont seems to have remained an inexplicable catastrophe. For them too, Gimme Shelter must seem like a historical record that couldn't be ignored even if one would prefer that it had never been made.

As of 2026, the film holds a score of 93% on Rotten Tomatoes based on 30 reviews, and a 91% on the "Popcornmeter" with 5,000+ ratings. The website's critical consensus reads "Equal parts essential and chilling, Gimme Shelter provides a spine-tingling look at how the Rolling Stones' music paralleled the end of the counterculture movement."

On Metacritic, the film has a weighted average score of 85 out of 100 based on 12 critic reviews, indicating "universal acclaim".

In a 1971 review for The Miami News, Susan Brink wrote that it was a "beautiful, honest film."

== Songs performed ==
The Rolling Stones

- "Jumpin' Jack Flash"
- "(I Can't Get No) Satisfaction"
- "You Gotta Move"
- "Wild Horses" (in studio at Muscle Shoals)
- "Brown Sugar"
- "Love in Vain"
- "Honky Tonk Women"
- "Street Fighting Man"
- "Sympathy for the Devil"
- "Under My Thumb"
- "Gimme Shelter" (live version, over closing credits)

Ike and Tina Turner

- "I've Been Loving You Too Long" (at Madison Square Garden)

Jefferson Airplane

- "The Other Side of This Life" (at Altamont)

Flying Burrito Brothers

- "Six Days on the Road" (at Altamont)

== See also ==
- List of American films of 1970
- Summer of Soul (2021)
- Festival (1967)
