= The Rolling Stones American Tour 1969 =

1969 concert tour by the Rolling Stones

- Tour by the Rolling Stones
- The tour poster by David Edward Byrd
- Location: Europe; North America
- Start date: 7 November 1969
- End date: 6 December 1969
- No. of shows: 24

the Rolling Stones concert chronology
- Hyde Park Festival 1969; American Tour 1969; European Tour 1970

The Rolling Stones' 1969 Tour of the United States took place in November 1969. With Ike & Tina Turner, Terry Reid, and B.B. King (replaced on some dates by Chuck Berry) as the supporting acts, rock critic Robert Christgau called it "history's first mythic rock and roll tour", while rock critic Dave Marsh wrote that the tour was "part of rock and roll legend" and one of the "benchmarks of an era." In 2017, Rolling Stone magazine ranked the tour among The 50 Greatest Concerts of the Last 50 Years.

== History ==
This was the Rolling Stones' first US tour since July 1966, with the absence partly due to drug charges and subsequent complications. Instead of performing in small- and medium-size venues to audiences of screaming girls, the band was playing to sold-out arenas with more mature crowds that were ready to listen to the music. They used a more sophisticated amplification system, and lighting was overseen by Chip Monck. It was Mick Taylor's first tour with the band; he had replaced Brian Jones that June, shortly before Jones's death, and had performed only one gig (the free concert in Hyde Park) with them before the tour.

Some rehearsals for this tour occurred in the basement of Stephen Stills' Laurel Canyon home.

The tour began on 7 November with a warm-up show at Colorado State University, and then proceeded generally west to east, often playing two shows a night. The tour's second stop, at The Forum in Los Angeles, attracted national media attention as the outing's formal opening. Shows sometimes ran past midnight, and the Rolling Stones' performance lasted about 75 minutes. Terry Reid, B.B. King (replaced on some dates by Chuck Berry), and Ike & Tina Turner were the supporting acts; audiences were typically in their seats for three hours, including long delays between acts, before the Rolling Stones materialized on stage.

On 23 November, the band appeared on The Ed Sullivan Show. "Gimme Shelter" opened the show. The show closed with "Love in Vain" and "Honky Tonk Women." The band mimed to prerecorded tracks and Jagger sang live. The performance was recorded at the CBS studios in Los Angeles and edited into the show to appear like they were in New York.

In his review of the shows on 27 and 28 November at New York City's Madison Square Garden, Francis X. Clines of The New York Times characterized the tour as "the major rock event of the year." Ike & Tina Turner were a fan favorite, and they reportedly upstaged the Rolling Stones. Janis Joplin joined the Turners on stage for an impromptu performance of "Land of 1000 Dances" at one of the Madison Square Garden shows.

Another well-known show from the tour was the second concert in Oakland, California on 9 November, which was captured on Live'r Than You'll Ever Be, one of the first-ever live bootleg recordings.

The final show of the tour as initially planned was on 28 November in New York City, but 30 November in West Palm Beach, Florida was added as a gesture to the organiser. The band also organised and headlined the free concert at Altamont on 6 December, which was tacked on at the end of the tour as a response to the high ticket prices of the tour itself.

Tour manager Sam Cutler introduced the Rolling Stones as "the greatest rock and roll band in the world", a title he had first bestowed upon them at their concert in London's Hyde Park the previous July. The tour set lists were derived mostly from 1968's Beggars Banquet album and the forthcoming Let It Bleed. The performance itself featured the Stones showmanship that would become familiar: Charlie Watts businesslike drumming leavened by an occasional wry smile, Bill Wyman's undertaker persona on bass, the guitar interplay of Mick Taylor with Keith Richards, and most of all Mick Jagger's prancing, strutting, leering and preening in front of the crowd. "Ah think I've busted a button on my trousers, I hope they don't fall down" he teased the audience. "You don't want my trousers to fall down, now do ya?" At one point in some shows, Jagger motioned for the audience to rush past ushers to the edge of the stage; of the group's reaction to the crowd's fervor, a spokesman said, "They loved it."

The US was in political turmoil at the time, and some militant groups tried to portray the tour as a call for radical political action, especially in light of the Rolling Stones' 1968 track "Street Fighting Man". The Rolling Stones themselves had no such interest, and while on tour Mick Jagger publicly rebuffed a request for support from the Black Panthers. Stones media appearances during the tour featured typical banter of the time on other issues; while other members of the group affected boredom, Jagger gave non-sequitur responses to cultural questions, and said of New York, "It's great. It changes. It explodes."

The tour sold over $1 million worth of tickets, with ticket prices ranging from $3.00 to $8.00. This tour represented a new financial model for rock acts pioneered by Ronnie Schneider, the sole producer and financial manager of the tour. Schneider was the nephew of Allen Klein, who had been recently fired by Keith Richards and Sam Cutler.

Neither Schneider nor the Stones had any money at the time to fund this endeavor so Schneider had to come up with a new business model and that meant the band getting a piece of the gross box office and demanding a 50% advance, which funded the shows.

Schneider's role involved securing box office receipts on behalf of the band. In this way, the band itself (and Schneider, whose interests were aligned with those of the band) was in control of all the money related to a tour. On behalf of the Rolling Stones, Schneider centralized the control, ownership and management of ancillary rights, licensing and the marketing of posters, T shirts, programs and other concert related materials—-vastly improving the group's revenue base while touring. Many other bands followed suit throughout the 1970s.

The 1970 concert album Get Yer Ya-Ya's Out!, mostly based on the Madison Square Garden shows, documented the tour, as did the Maysles brothers' 1970 documentary Gimme Shelter which, while mostly known for its filming of Altamont, also contains substantial footage of the band's performance during the tour at Madison Square Garden. Gimme Shelter also captures Jagger's famous response to a press-conference question about whether he was "any more satisfied now": "Financially dissatisfied, sexually satisfied, philosophically trying."

== Personnel ==
The Rolling Stones

- Mick Jagger – lead vocals, harmonica
- Keith Richards – guitar, backing vocals
- Mick Taylor – guitar
- Bill Wyman – bass
- Charlie Watts – drums

Additional musicians

- Ian Stewart – piano

Ike & Tina Turner Revue

- Ike Turner
- Tina Turner
- The Ikettes: Esther Jones, Pat Powdrill, Claudia Lenner
- The Kings of Rhythm

== Set list ==
A typical set list for the tour included the following, although there were substitutions (note the presence of "Gimme Shelter" on Live'r Than You'll Ever Be and "Brown Sugar" was performed at Altamont), variations and order switches throughout the tour.

All songs by Mick Jagger and Keith Richards, except where noted.

1. "Jumpin' Jack Flash"
2. "Carol" (Chuck Berry)
3. "Sympathy for the Devil"
4. "Stray Cat Blues"
5. "Love in Vain" (Robert Johnson)
6. "Prodigal Son" (Robert Wilkins)
7. "You Gotta Move" (Fred McDowell/Rev. Gary Davis)
8. "Under My Thumb"
9. "I'm Free"
10. "Midnight Rambler"
11. "Live with Me"
12. "Little Queenie" (Berry)
13. "(I Can't Get No) Satisfaction"
14. "Honky Tonk Women"
15. "Street Fighting Man"

== Tour dates ==
Note: The final scheduled date of the tour was Boston, 29 November 1969. The West Palm Beach International Music and Arts Festival on 30 November and the Altamont Free Concert on 6 December were planned as separate events and added while the tour was in progress. A further four dates were completed in London, United Kingdom during December 1969; these were also separate events to the main tour.

Date	City	Country	Venue	Opening act(s) / event
North America
7 November 1969	Fort Collins	United States	Moby Gymnasium	B.B. King; Terry Reid
8 November 1969 (2 shows)	Inglewood	United States	The Forum	Ike & Tina Turner; B.B. King; Terry Reid
9 November 1969 (2 shows)	Oakland	United States	Oakland–Alameda County Coliseum Arena	Ike & Tina Turner; B.B. King; Terry Reid
10 November 1969	San Diego	United States	San Diego International Sports Center	Ike & Tina Turner; B.B. King; Terry Reid
11 November 1969	Phoenix	United States	Arizona Veterans Memorial Coliseum	Ike & Tina Turner; B.B. King; Terry Reid
13 November 1969	University Park	United States	Moody Coliseum	Chuck Berry; Terry Reid
14 November 1969 (2 shows)	Auburn	United States	Memorial Coliseum	Chuck Berry; Terry Reid
15 November 1969 (2 shows)	Champaign	United States	Assembly Hall	Chuck Berry; Terry Reid
16 November 1969 (2 shows)	Chicago	United States	International Amphitheatre	Chuck Berry; Terry Reid
23 November 1969	New York City	United States	Ed Sullivan Theater	The Ed Sullivan Show
24 November 1969	Detroit	United States	Detroit Olympia	B.B. King; Terry Reid
25 November 1969	Philadelphia	United States	Spectrum	B.B. King; Terry Reid
26 November 1969	Baltimore	United States	Baltimore Civic Center	B.B. King; Terry Reid
27 November 1969	New York City	United States	Madison Square Garden	Ike & Tina Turner; B.B. King; Terry Reid
28 November 1969 (2 shows)	New York City	United States	Madison Square Garden	Ike & Tina Turner; B.B. King; Terry Reid
29 November 1969 (2 shows)	Boston	United States	Boston Garden	B.B. King; Terry Reid
US Festivals
30 November 1969	Jupiter	United States	Palm Beach International Raceway	West Palm Beach International Music and Arts Festival
6 December 1969	Tracy	United States	Altamont Speedway	Altamont Speedway Free Festival
Europe
14 December 1969 (2 shows)	London	England	Saville Theatre	—N/a
21 December 1969 (2 shows)	London	England	Lyceum Ballroom	Procol Harum
