= Pharmacy (disambiguation) =

Pharmacy is the science and technique of preparing and dispensing medicines.

A pharmacy (shop) is also a place where medication is dispensed, or a prescription drug-dispensing operation, most commonly a community pharmacy.

Other meanings include:

- The Pharmacy, Seattle indie rock band
- Pharmacy (Galantis album), 2015
- Pharmacy (Hitorie album), 2022
- Pharmacy (restaurant), the defunct restaurant in Notting Hill, London
- Pharmacy Records, a record label
