= Altamont Diary =

Studio album by Black Cab
- Released: 2004
- Genre: Indie rock
- Length: 38:20
- Label: Interstate 40 Music
- Producer: Woody Annison

Black Cab chronology
Altamont Diary (2004)	Jesus East (2006)

Professional ratings
Review scores
Source	Rating
The Age	3.5/5 stars
The Sunday Age	4/5 stars
Sydney Morning Herald	3.5/5 stars

Altamont Diary is the debut album by Melbourne electronica band Black Cab. Released in 2004, it is a concept album based on the ill-fated 1969 free concert at Altamont Speedway in California headlined by the Rolling Stones.

David Fricke wrote in US Rolling Stone magazine: "With bloodied-fuzz guitars, hellish electronics and sound bites from Gimme Shelter, the Australian duo Black Cab has created a riveting, album-length memorial to the fatal folly of the Rolling Stones' free concert at Altamont Speedway."

Band programmer Andrew Coates said he came up with the idea while living in San Francisco. "In a collectors' shop I found the issue of Rolling Stone magazine that came out after Altamont with a 20-page special. The album grew from there, loosely inspired by the events of a day which ended so badly, the end of the summer of love." He said San Francisco "had already got a bit shitty—the Grateful Dead had moved out of their squat and into the hills, and the Haight-Ashbury was full of street kids and harder drugs. Altamont was like putting all of them into a shitty field and beating them."

Sam Cutler, who only learned of the album in 2006—and subsequently contributed a spoken-word section to the band's follow-up, Jesus East—said: "It was such a bizarre idea that someone would make an album based about a disaster. It's like making an album about famine—not an album of pop songs designed to raise money to alleviate famine, more like an album about what it feels like to starve to death. But I loved it, especially the slightly psycho fearfulness of it. Bits of it made me feel afraid."

== Track listing ==
(all songs by Andrew Coates, James Lee except where noted)

1. "Summer of Love" — 4:51
2. "Its OK" — 2:50
3. "Angels Arrive" — 3:47
4. "Jerry Sez" — 1:18
5. "Good Drugs" — 4:52
6. "Hey People" — 2:28
7. "New Speedway Boogie" (Jerry Garcia, Robert Hunter) — 4:24
8. "A Killing" — 2:12
9. "1970" — 10:41
10. (Untitled track) — 0:50

== Personnel ==
- James Lee — guitars, bass, vocals
- Andrew Coates — vocals, programming

=== Additional musicians ===
- Adam Cunha — bass ("Summer of Love", "New Speedway Boogie")
- Richard Andrew — live drums ("Summer of Love", ""Good Drugs", "1970")
- Glenn Sharp — sitar
- Angela Gilltrap — backing vocals ("Summer of Love")
- Andrew McCubbin — acoustic guitar ("1970", "New Speedway Boogie")
- Woody Annison — additional keyboards
