= Call Signs =

Studio album by Black Cab
- Released: July 2009
- Recorded: March 2008 – May 2009
- Genre: Electronica
- Length: 45:11
- Label: Laughing Outlaw
- Producer: Woody Annison

Black Cab chronology
| Jesus East (2006) | Call Signs (2009) | Games of the XXI Olympiad (2014) |

Professional ratings
Review scores
| Source | Rating |
|---|---|
| The Age | 3.5/5 stars |
| Sunday Herald Sun | 3.5/5 stars |

Call Signs is the third studio album by Melbourne electronica band Black Cab, released in 2009.

The album evokes the atmosphere of the former totalitarian state of East Germany, set to a soundtrack of post-punk and atmospheric electronics. In an interview, the band explained the album's sound was inspired by a rare Black Cab tour of Europe in May 2007. Travelling through the former East Germany in a van, vocalist Andrew Coates and guitarist James Lee were struck by the decrepit villages and rundown cities. At the same time they were reading Stasiland, Anna Funder's 2004 book about the vast state security apparatus that entangled millions of East Germans. Coates explained: "Stasiland really captured the mentality of living at a time when around 50 percent of East Germans contributed intelligence information, often about their neighbours. There was so much distrust and paranoia and it really interested us."

The album featured Died Pretty vocalist Ron Peno on one track, "Ghost Anthems".

The album was given a favorable reception in reviews, described as "a standout album of mood and moment" and "a powerful work of post-punk atmospherics". It featured in the list of the year's best albums by both the Melbourne Sunday Herald Sun and Sydney Morning Herald. and was shortlisted for the Australian Music Prize.

== Track listing ==
(All songs by Andrew Coates and James Lee except where indicated)

1. "Call Signs – 0:23
2. "Church in Berlin" – 4:49
3. "Rescue – 4:45
4. "Fates" – 1:01
5. "Black Angel" – 4:07
6. "Dresden Dynamo" – 3:32
7. "Lost & Falling" – 4:58
8. "Sonnenallee" – 5:59
9. "Wires" – 1:25
10. "Ghost Anthems" (Coates, Lee, Ron Peno) – 3:45
11. "After the War" – 5:01
12. "Wires 2" – 0:30
13. "Sword & Shield" - 4:48

== Personnel ==
- Andrew Coates - vocals, programming, arrangements
- James Lee - electric and acoustic guitar
- Rich Andrew - drums
- Anthony Paine - bass, guitar ("After the War")
- Alex Jarvis - guitar, red witch ("Black Angel")
- Steve Law - keyboards ("Rescue")
- Andy Papp - bass ("Sonnenallee")
- Ron Peno - vocals ("Ghost Anthems")
- Matty Vehl - acoustic piano ("Sword & Shield")
