= Black Cab (band) =

Australian musical group

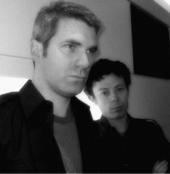

Background information
- Origin: Melbourne, Australia
- Genres: Electronica; drone; alternative rock; indie rock; industrial rock; shoegaze
- Instruments: guitar, bass, drums, electronic programming and treatments
- Years active: 1999–present
- Labels: Interstate 40 Music; Stickman Records; Remote Control Records; Laughing Outlaw
- Members: Andrew Coates; James Lee; Wes Holland
- Past members: Evan Tweedie; Ashley Davis; Richard Andrew; Anthony Paine; Steve Law; Alex Jarvis; Lucy Buckeridge
- Website: Official site

Black Cab is a Melbourne-based drone and electronica group. The band has released six studio albums.

== Biography ==
=== 1999–2008: Altamont Diary and Jesus East ===
Melbourne-based Australian band Black Cab's principal songwriters are guitarist James Lee and vocalist Andrew Coates, who originally performed together in early 1990s industrial rock group Foil. After an initial collaboration in 1999 produced a limited edition 3-track EP entitled Illinois Chapter, Coates moved to San Francisco and began writing what would become the band's first full-length album, Altamont Diary (2004), a concept album loosely based on the Rolling Stones' Altamont Free Concert. The album was recorded gradually over a two-year period and was produced and mixed by Melbourne producer Woody Annison. At that time James Lee was playing in Melbourne bands Registered Nurse and The Fergs. The debut album also featured a number of local Melbourne musicians including Richard Andrew on drums (Registered Nurse, Underground Lovers), Andrew McCubbin and Glenn Sharpe on sitar, as well as Adam Cunha from San Francisco mod rock group Helium Angel. The album Altamont Diary was released in mid-2004. Joining Black Cab for related live shows were Anthony Paine on bass (High Pass Filter), Steve Law (Zen Paradox) and Alex Jarvis (Automatic). Ashley Naylor (Even) also guested at a number of shows during 2005 and 2006.

The live band contributed recordings for what would become the band's second album, Jesus East, which was released in Australia in 2006 on Interstate 40 Music/Pharmacy Records and in Europe in early 2007, courtesy of Hamburg-based indie label Stickman Records. Guest vocals on the track 13 Days were performed by Japanese LA-based vocalist and performance artist Sayaka Yabuki. The album also featured studio recordings from sitar master Radhey Gupta and tabla percussionist Hermant Kumar. The legendary road manager of the Rolling Stones on their fateful 1969 US tour, Sam Cutler, recorded a spoken word for the track "Valiant" where he recalls his time managing and living with the Grateful Dead in the early 1970s. The band toured the Netherlands, Germany and Austria in May 2007 and a limited edition tour EP, Surrender, was released to coincide with the tour and featured remixes of tracks from "Jesus East" by Woody Annison and Steve Law, as well as a number of live recordings from shows in 2006. Many tracks from the Jesus East and Altamont Diary LPs were used in the 2013 feature-length documentary on the life of Australian surfer Wayne Lynch directed by Craig Griffin, Uncharted Waters.

=== 2009–2016: Call Signs and Games of the XXI Olympiad ===
The band's third album, Call Signs, was released in Australia in July 2009 through Sydney label Laughing Outlaw Records. The album was inspired by East German culture and 1970s life under the communist regime and Stasi security apparatus. The album was produced by Woody Annison and featured lyrics and lead vocals by Died Pretty vocalist Ron Peno on the track "Ghost Anthems". The track "Black Angel" was inspired by the life of 1970s singer-songwriter Judee Sill. The album also contained numerous found sounds of 1970s East German spy transmissions and call signs. The album was shortlisted for the 2009 Australian Music Prize.

In 2010 the band released the single "Sexy Polizei" featuring backing vocals from Melbourne songstress Monique Brumby and produced by Melbourne producer Simon Polinski. A year later they released the single "Combat Boots", also produced by Simon Polinski. In July 2011 the band stripped down to a three-piece (James Lee, Andrew Coates and Steve Law) to focus on more electronic-driven music. Steve Law left in 2013 and was replaced by Sand Pebbles drummer Wes Holland on live and electronic drums.

The band's fourth album, Games of the XXI Olympiad, was released in November 2014. Recorded with multiple producers, including former Death in Vegas member Tim Holmes, Simon Polinski and Woody Annison for final mixes and production, the album moved the band's sound firmly towards electronica and was loosely based on the 1976 Summer Olympics in Montreal. Remixes of "Victorious" by Mikey Young and "Sexy Polizei" by Scott Fraser and Timothy J. Fairplay were released in 2015, and the band released a single, "Uniforms", in 2016, featuring additional keyboards and programming from Mikey Young of Eddy Current Suppression Ring and Total Control.

=== 2017–2019: 明 (Akira) ===
In January 2017 the band performed an alternative soundtrack to the 1988 manga classic Akira live at Melbourne's Astor Theatre with taiko master Toshi Sakamoto. This performance formed the basis for a soundtrack album, 明 (Akira), released in August 2017. The album was described as being inspired by Japanese sci-fi anime. The band released "Empire States" in February 2017, featuring the 12-minute single "Empire States" and "Senses Wild", with a remix of "Empire States" by Richard Norris of The Grid. Evan Tweedie (ex-Husky and Dub FX) played with the band on bass in 2018 and 2019 having tracked bass on various new recordings during the course of 2017 and 2018.

=== 2019–present: Rotsler's Rules ===
Black Cab released their sixth album, Rotsler's Rules, on vinyl and digital in May 2022 through Remote Control Records. The album was recorded with Graeme Pogson (GL, Bamboos), mixed by Woody Annison and mastered by Andrei Eremin, with the album's title a tribute to William "Bill" Rotsler, who developed "Rotsler's Rules for Costuming" for cosplay events. The album's second single, "Rotsler's Rules", made Berlin-based Radio Eins' top 100 tracks of 2021.

Former drummer Richard Andrew died on October 30, 2024, after being diagnosed with lung cancer, aged 58.

== Discography ==
=== Albums ===
Title	Details
Altamont Diary	Released: November 2004; Label: Interstate/Pharmacy (INTER005); Format: CD, LP, digital download
Jesus East	Released: 2006; Label: Interstate/Pharmacy (INTER006); Format: CD, LP, digital download
Call Signs	Released: August 2009; Label: Interstate/Inertia (INTER016); Format: CD, LP, digital download
Games of the XXI Olympiad	Released: 5 November 2014; Label: Interstate 40 Music (INTER009); Format: CD, LP, digital download, streaming
明 (Akira)	Released: 4 August 2017; Label: Interstate 40 Music (INTER14); Format: CD, LP, digital download, streaming
Rotsler's Rules	Released: 13 May 2022; Label: Interstate 40 Music (INTER18); Format: LP, digital download, streaming

=== Live albums ===
Title	Details
Live at Newtown Social Club	Released: June 2016; Label: Interstate 40 Music; Format: digital download

=== Singles ===
List of singles, showing year released and album
Title	Year	Album
"Sexy Polizei"	2010	Games of the XXI Olympiad
"Combat Boots"	2011	Games of the XXI Olympiad
"Go Slow"	2013	Games of the XXI Olympiad
"Ender (Forces Remix)"	2015	non-album remix
"Uniforms"	2016	non-album single
"Empire States"	2017	non-album single
"Take It"	2019	non-album single
"Hanna"	2020	Rotsler's Rules
"Rotsler's Rules"	2021	Rotsler's Rules
"Halo"	2021	Rotsler's Rules
"Superheroes"	2022	Rotsler's Rules
"Non-Playable"	2023	non-album single

== Awards and nominations ==
=== Australian Music Prize ===
The Australian Music Prize (the AMP) is an annual award of $30,000 given to an Australian band or solo artist in recognition of the merit of an album released during the year of award. The commenced in 2005.

Year	Nominee / work	Award	Result
2009	Call Signs	Australian Music Prize	Nominated

=== Music Victoria Awards ===
The Music Victoria Awards are an annual awards night celebrating Victorian music. They commenced in 2006.

Year	Nominee / work	Award	Result	Ref.
2022	"Rotsler’s Rules"	Best Victorian Song	Nominated	
