= Killing of Meredith Hunter =

Stabbing death at the 1969 Altamont Free Concert

Coordinates: 37.738°N 121.562°W

- Meredith Hunter, being stabbed in the back by Alan Passaro
- Date: December 6, 1969
- Venue: Altamont Speedway
- Location: Altamont, California, US
- Type: Stabbing
- Perpetrator: Alan Passaro
- Arrests: One
- Trial: December 1970 – January 1971
- Verdict: Not guilty

Meredith Hunter, a young black man, was stabbed and killed at the Altamont Free Concert in California, on December 6, 1969, by Alan Passaro, a member of the Hells Angels outlaw motorcycle gang. The show, the final concert of The Rolling Stones American Tour 1969, was jointly arranged by the Rolling Stones and the Grateful Dead, with the biker gang providing security. The Grateful Dead suggested them for that role, as they had previously provided security for Dead concerts.

Between 250,000 and 300,000 people attended the concert, which included performances by Jefferson Airplane, Santana, Crosby, Stills, Nash & Young, and the Flying Burrito Brothers, in addition to the Rolling Stones. The Grateful Dead had planned to play, but cancelled their set when they saw the violence during the concert. Many in the audience had taken LSD from a tainted batch; the drug had been added to low-cost Gallo Red Mountain wine, which was being consumed freely. The Hells Angels injured several fans with fists or sawed-off pool cues, causing injuries requiring medical attention, and knocked out Marty Balin, lead singer of Jefferson Airplane.

Hunter was at the concert with his girlfriend, Patty Bredehoft. He had taken amphetamines and methamphetamine and was carrying a Smith & Wesson revolver for protection. He became involved in an altercation with the Angels and drew his revolver but then turned to go into the crowd, at which point Passaro jumped on his back and stabbed him multiple times. Other bikers joined in, hitting and kicking him. Hunter died soon afterwards. Passaro was arrested for the killing in March 1970, while in prison on other charges. He admitted he had stabbed Hunter but said it was in self-defense. He was found not guilty.

Hunter's death, caught on camera by Albert and David Maysles, was included in their 1970 film about the tour and concert, Gimme Shelter. It is referenced in two songs: the Grateful Dead's "New Speedway Boogie" – which appeared as the B-side of "Uncle John's Band" (1971) – and Don McLean's 1971 song "American Pie".

== Background ==
=== Meredith Hunter ===
Hunter at the concert shortly before his death

Meredith Curly Hunter Jr., who was black, was born October 24, 1951. After his father left the family in 1952, Hunter was raised by his mother and his sister, Dixie, who was eight years older than him. In 1962 he was imprisoned at a juvenile detention center for five months as an out-of-control youth. Six weeks after he was released, he was returned to detention for a parole violation. In October 1964, at thirteen, he was arrested and imprisoned on three counts of burglary. In January 1966, he was jailed for two counts of burglary; he was again imprisoned in April 1967 on another burglary charge, and then for parole violation the following year. His final term of imprisonment ended in May 1969.

Hunter, nicknamed "Murdock", was a member of the East Bay Executioners street gang. He dealt and used drugs, including cannabis, benzedrine, and crystal meth (by injection). According to the writer Rich Cohen, Hunter "embraced violence with both fists. He was a badass motherfucker, ... known to traffic in amphetamines and carry a gun. ... his temper could click from mellow to crazy just like that".

At the time of the Altamont Free Concert, Hunter was a dapper dresser, with what music critic Joel Selvin describes as "a cool line of patter". He had a white girlfriend, Patty Bredehoft, a seventeen-year-old high school senior from Berkeley. They had only been dating for a few weeks and had previously been to a concert by the Temptations at a club in San Francisco.

=== Hells Angels and the counterculture ===
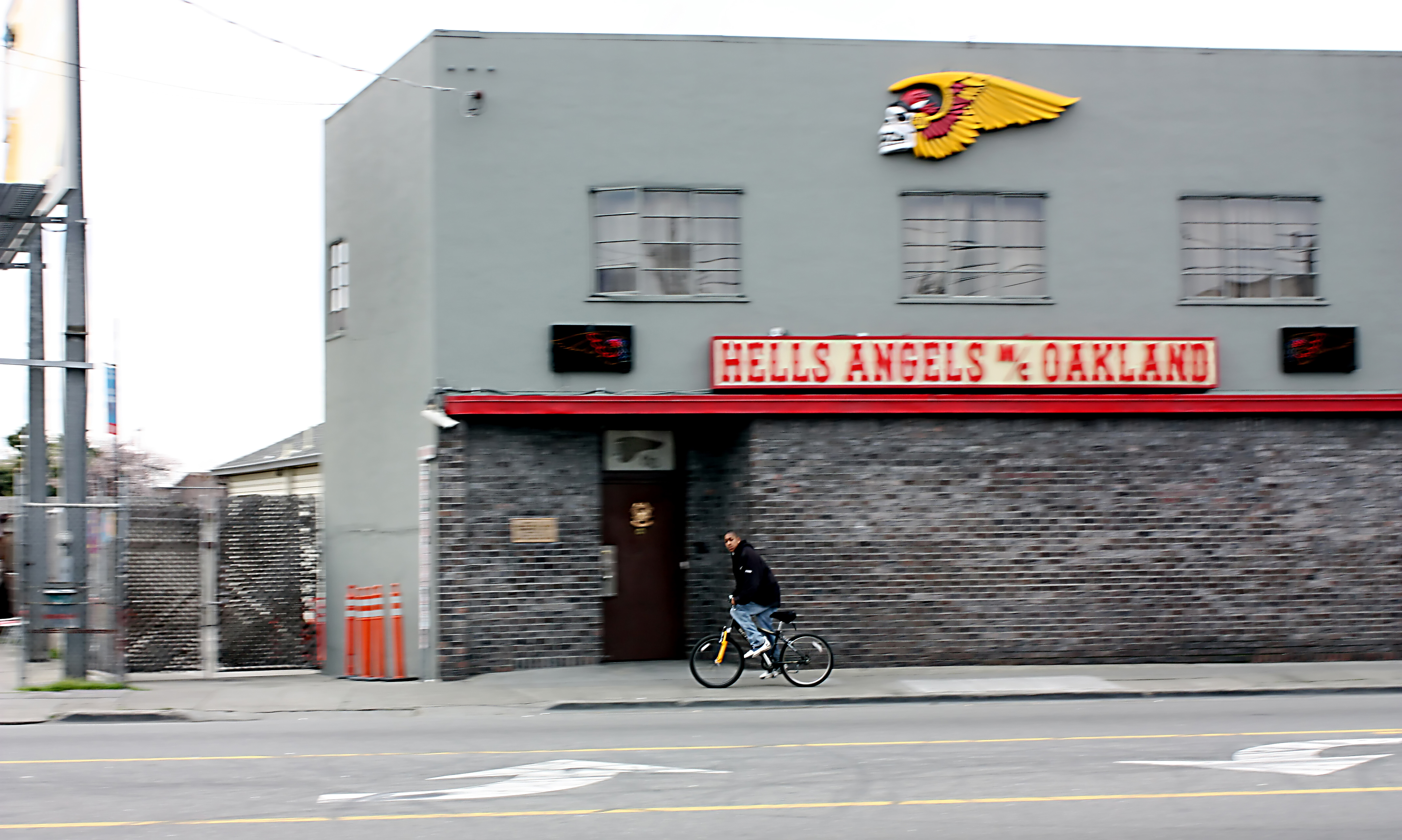
Hells Angels clubhouse in Oakland, California

The Hells Angels are an outlaw motorcycle gang that has been described by the police as a threat to public safety and order. Local groups of Hells Angels are "chapters"; the chapter based in Oakland, California, was formed in 1957 by Sonny Barger, the group's president. In the mid-to-late 1960s, the Hells Angels and the counterculture movement had much in common, including a rejection of authority and conformity. The Angels and members of the counterculture mixed frequently. When the writer Ken Kesey held an LSD (acid) party in October 1966, the Angels were invited. The organization was dealing LSD in San Francisco, distributing 50,000 hits a week by 1965. When San Francisco bands – including the Grateful Dead, Jefferson Airplane, and Big Brother and the Holding Company – held concerts, the Angels were asked to help with safety, crowd control and other arrangements. Grateful Dead manager Rock Scully was among the supporters of the bikers and told the Rolling Stones that "The Angels are really some righteous dudes. They carry themselves with honor and dignity."

=== Alan Passaro ===
Alan Passaro was a white male who was twenty-two years old in December 1969. He wanted to become a lawyer, but after he finished high school in 1967, he went to barber college instead. He got a job as a barber and married his girlfriend; they bought a house in Milpitas, California, and had a son. He joined the San Jose chapter of the Gypsy Joker Motorcycle Club, a group that soon merged with the local Hells Angels chapter.

Passaro was arrested in 1963 on charges of auto theft and was imprisoned at a juvenile facility. He was arrested for car theft again in May 1968 and was found in possession of marijuana; he was given two years' probation. In December 1968, he was arrested for assaulting a police officer, disturbing the peace and resisting arrest, but he was acquitted. The following January he was imprisoned for a parole violation. He was arrested in July 1969 for grand theft, conspiracy and possession of stolen goods, and shortly afterwards was arrested for possession of marijuana; at the time of the Altamont concert, he was on bail from both charges.

=== The Rolling Stones ===
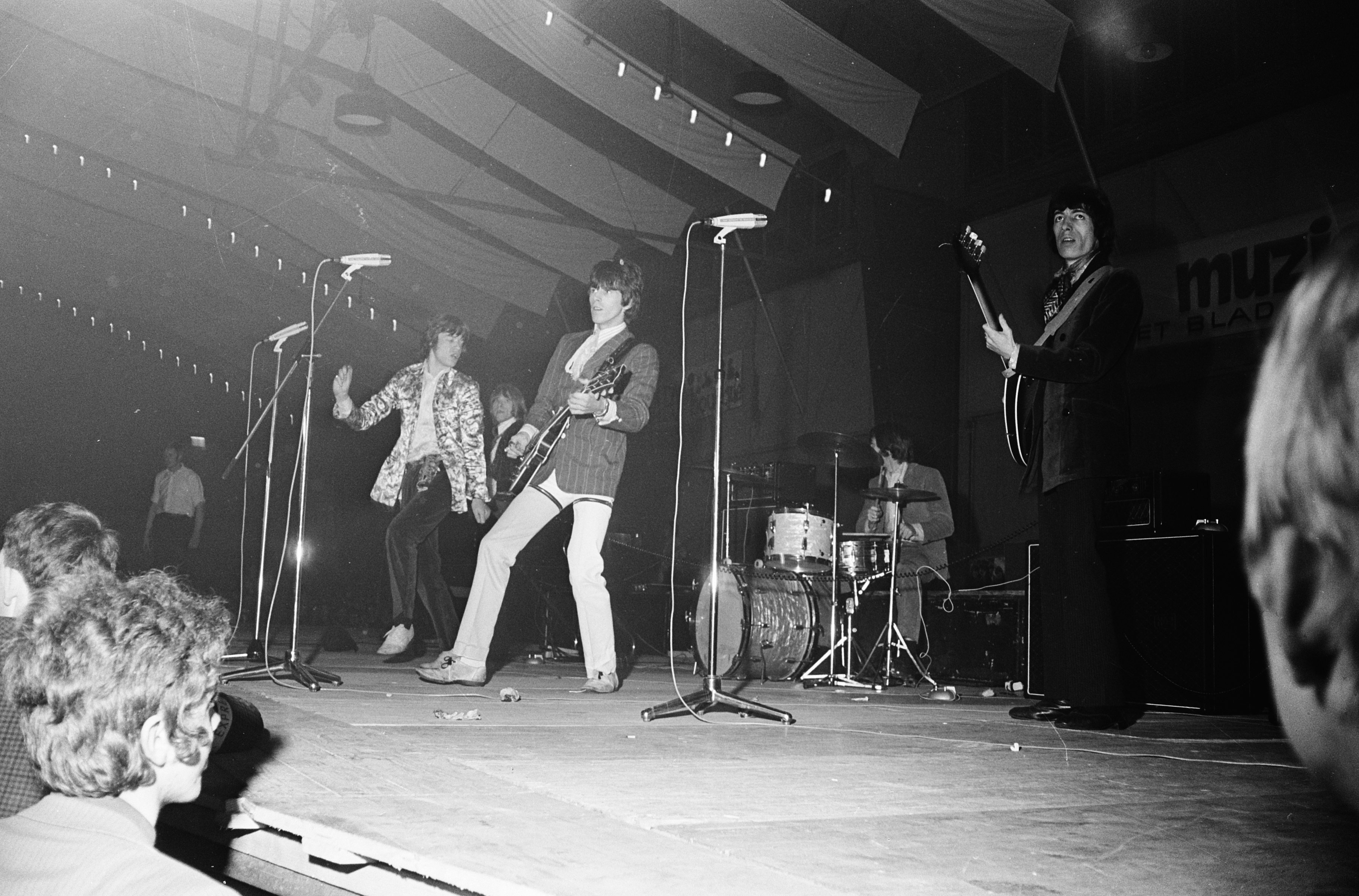
The Rolling Stones in 1967

The Rolling Stones are a British rock band formed in 1962. Although it was internationally popular through the 1960s, by 1969 the band members were nearly bankrupt because their manager, Allen Klein, controlled the band's income tightly and only released a small percentage to them. They decided to select a new manager and tour the US to raise funds.

In July 1969, the group played a free concert in Hyde Park, London, before an audience of up to 500,000 people. (Note: Estimates range from 250,000 to 500,000.) The British branch of the Hells Angels provided security, something that the Rolling Stones guitarist Keith Richards called "beautiful". The British Hells Angels thought of themselves as closely related to their American counterparts, but the two organizations were unrelated and very different. Some of the Angels at the show were senior citizens who spent much of the time socializing, drinking tea, and leaving the security work to the police.

Ronnie Schneider, the band's financial manager on the tour, introduced a new business model that demanded fifty percent of the band's fees from local promoters in advance. According to journalists, he raised ticket prices by fifty percent or sometimes double their normal levels, (Note: Ticket prices ranged from $3.00 to $8.00 (approximately $26 to $53 in 2025).) and the tour sold over $1 million worth of tickets. (Note: $1 million in 1969 equates to approximately $6.7 million in 2025, according to calculations based on the US gross domestic product measure of inflation.) The rise in ticket prices led to criticism in the press, most notably from Ralph J. Gleason, a co-founder of Rolling Stone magazine and a columnist for the San Francisco Chronicle. In the latter publication he wrote:

Paying five, six and seven dollars for a Stones concert at the Oakland Coliseum for, say, an hour of the Rolling Stones seen a quarter of a mile away because the artists demand such outrageous fees that they can only be obtained under these circumstances, says a very bad thing to me about the artist attitude toward the public. It says they despise their own audience.

Schneider rejected the criticism of the price hikes, pointing out that the Rolling Stones were charging only slightly more than bands like Blind Faith and the Doors. Regardless, the column was reprinted in full in Rolling Stone. After Mick Jagger, the lead singer of the Rolling Stones, read the column, the band decided to counter the negative publicity by holding a free concert in San Francisco at the end of their tour.

=== Planning the concert ===
In a discussion with the Rolling Stones, Scully, the Grateful Dead's manager, suggested they put on the free concert at San Francisco's Golden Gate Park. Other bands soon signed to play at the concert, which was organized jointly by the Stones and the Dead, including Jefferson Airplane, Santana, Crosby, Stills, Nash & Young, and the Flying Burrito Brothers. In late November, the application for a license to use the park was denied by the San Francisco city government; at a press conference on November 25, Jagger was asked whether the free concert was going ahead. He told reporters, "It's going to be on December – er – sixth in San Francisco. But it isn't going to be in Golden Gate Park. It's going to be somewhere adjacent to Golden Gate Park and a bit larger."

To offset the costs of staging the concert – and to make a profit – the Stones commissioned Albert and David Maysles to film the concert. They also shot some footage at Madison Square Garden and two other concerts during the tour. The band gave the filmmakers $14,000 to cover the costs of filming at the Garden and $120,000 for the Altamont concert. (Note: $14,000 in 1969 equates to approximately $100,000 in 2025, according to calculations based on the US gross domestic product measure of inflation.)

Three days before the scheduled concert date, the search was continuing for a suitable venue. An offer was made by the owners of the Sears Point Raceway to hold the concert there, and Chip Monck, the stage manager for the event, began to move equipment there as negotiations proceeded. The lighting towers were erected, and the top of a hill on the site was bulldozed to construct a stage. Twenty-four hours before the start of the concert, however, the raceway owners demanded either the distribution rights to the Maysles' film or a $100,000 payment up front, plus another $100,000 to be held in escrow to cover any potential damage to the site. (Note: $100,000 in 1969 equates to approximately $700,000 in 2025, according to calculations based on the US gross domestic product measure of inflation.) Schneider refused to negotiate over the film rights and twenty-four hours before the start of the concert, the negotiations collapsed. Soon after the news broke, businessman Dick Carter offered his venue as an alternative: the Altamont Speedway, a racetrack 40 miles (64 km) east of San Francisco. Carter said he did not want any payment for the use and thought the free publicity would be lucrative enough.

Monck and his team moved the equipment to the new venue and began setting up the lighting towers. With only 24 hours until the concert, they reused the low stage they had built at Sears Point. It was only 3 feet (0.91 m) high, intended to be situated at the top of a slope; at Altamont, it sat at the bottom of a depression. As the stage was so low, a rope was set up in front of it to keep the crowd back, but the rope was knocked down by the surging fans.

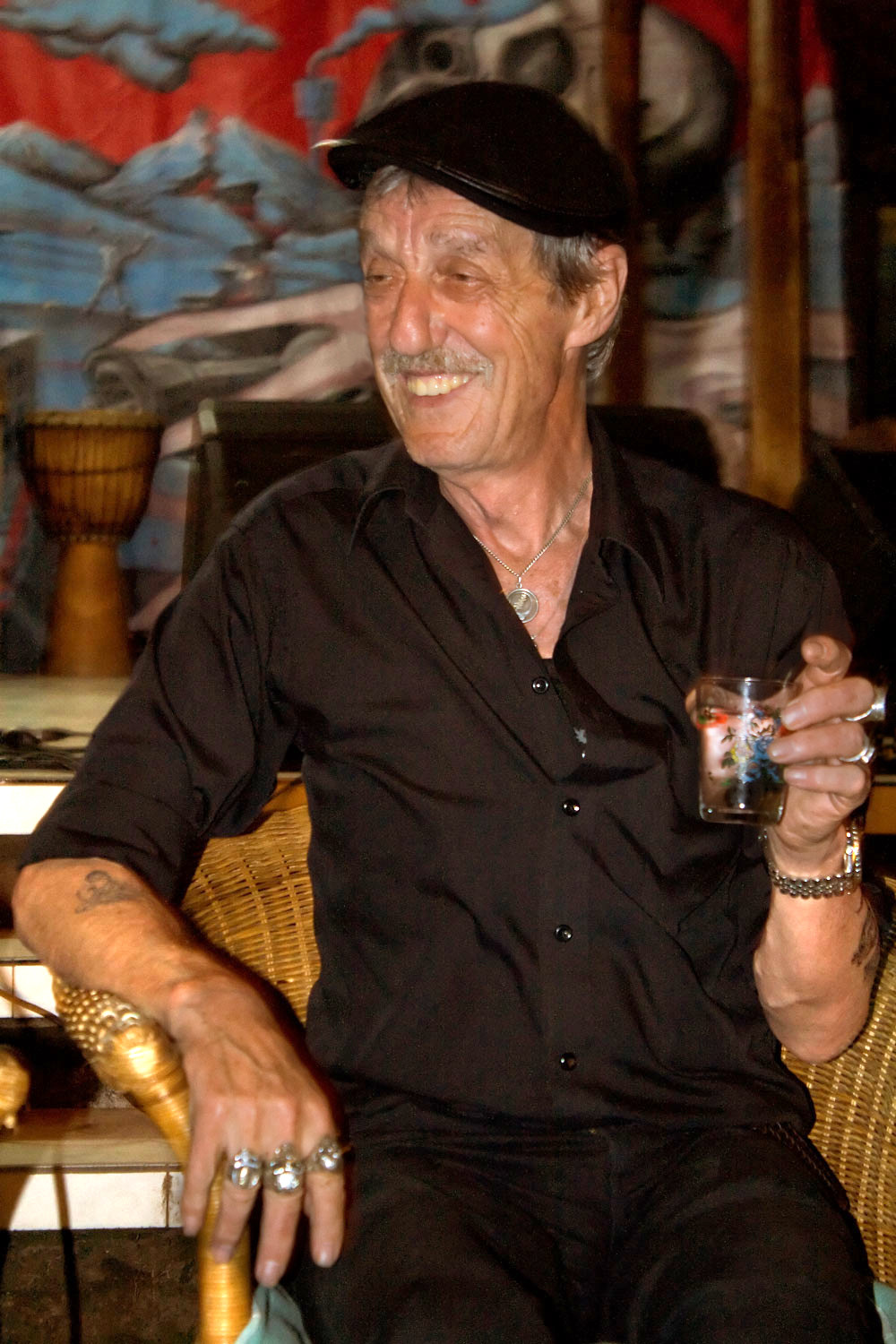
Sam Cutler, the Rolling Stones' 1969 tour manager

Philip Norman, a Rolling Stones biographer, writes that "exactly who first had the idea of hiring Hell's Angels as a security force, no one can remember now". Based on the advice of the Grateful Dead, Sam Cutler, the tour manager for the Stones, met with Pete Knell, a member of the San Francisco chapter of the Hells Angels. (Note: Emmett Grogan of the Diggers – a San Francisco-based anarchistic cooperative – had also suggested the Rolling Stones have an honor guard of "a hundred Angels on hogs escort the Stones. Nobody'll come near the Angels, man. They wouldn't dare.") Cutler described the meeting as "good politics", as "the free concert would be held on their turf". Knell explained that the Angels would not police anything, something Cutler agreed with, saying they had enough police for the event; Cutler and Knell came to an agreement that the Angels would be there and that the bands would provide them with $500 worth of beer. (Note: $500 in 1969 equates to approximately $4,000 in 2025, according to calculations based on the United States Consumer Price Index measure of inflation.) Cutler later said:

The only agreement there ever was, basically, was the Angels, if they were going to do anything, would make sure nobody fucked with the generators, but that was the extent of it. ... But there was no "They're going to be the police force" or anything like that. That's all bollocks, media-generated bullshit.

== Concert violence ==
Silent footage of performances from the concert

A crowd of 250,000 to 300,000 turned up to watch the Altamont concert. As had happened at many of the previous festivals, sellers of various narcotics were among them, including some who were selling a tainted batch of LSD. Also being sold were large quantities of Red Mountain jug wine, some of which had been adulterated with the tainted LSD and sold to unsuspecting buyers who were not aware of the added drug. Few understood that ingesting alcohol and LSD could produce symptoms that Selvin identifies as "erratic, unpredictable behavior, often including violent outbursts". Many in the crowd experienced bad trips on the acid, and 780 cases were reported at the site's medical tent, overwhelming the psychiatric staff who were there for just such incidents.

Violence began once the Hells Angels arrived; pop culture historian Saul Austerlitz describes them as "violent authoritarians in the guise of bikers". A woman who stripped naked and began hugging people was beaten by the Angels. A large man, who had been drinking the acid-spiked wine, also stripped naked and wandered around the crowd. The bikers beat him with sawed-off pool cues, breaking his teeth; he continued to walk around naked, with blood on his face and chest. One man who came to his aid was also beaten by the Angels and needed sixty stitches. Black members of the crowd were attacked with particular viciousness, according to Austerlitz.

Crowd members were not the only ones on whom the Hells Angels meted out violence. Monck, the stage manager, was attacked with a pool cue and lost most of his upper teeth; Marty Balin, the lead singer of Jefferson Airplane, was knocked unconscious by a Hells Angel while onstage. When he regained consciousness and complained about it, the biker again knocked him out. Having witnessed some of the violence unleashed by the Angels, Jerry Garcia of the Grateful Dead told his bandmates: "This show is like some kind of runaway train, and we best get the fuck out of here before it runs into us." They decided not to play and left the venue while the Rolling Stones were playing their set.

=== Hunter stabbing ===
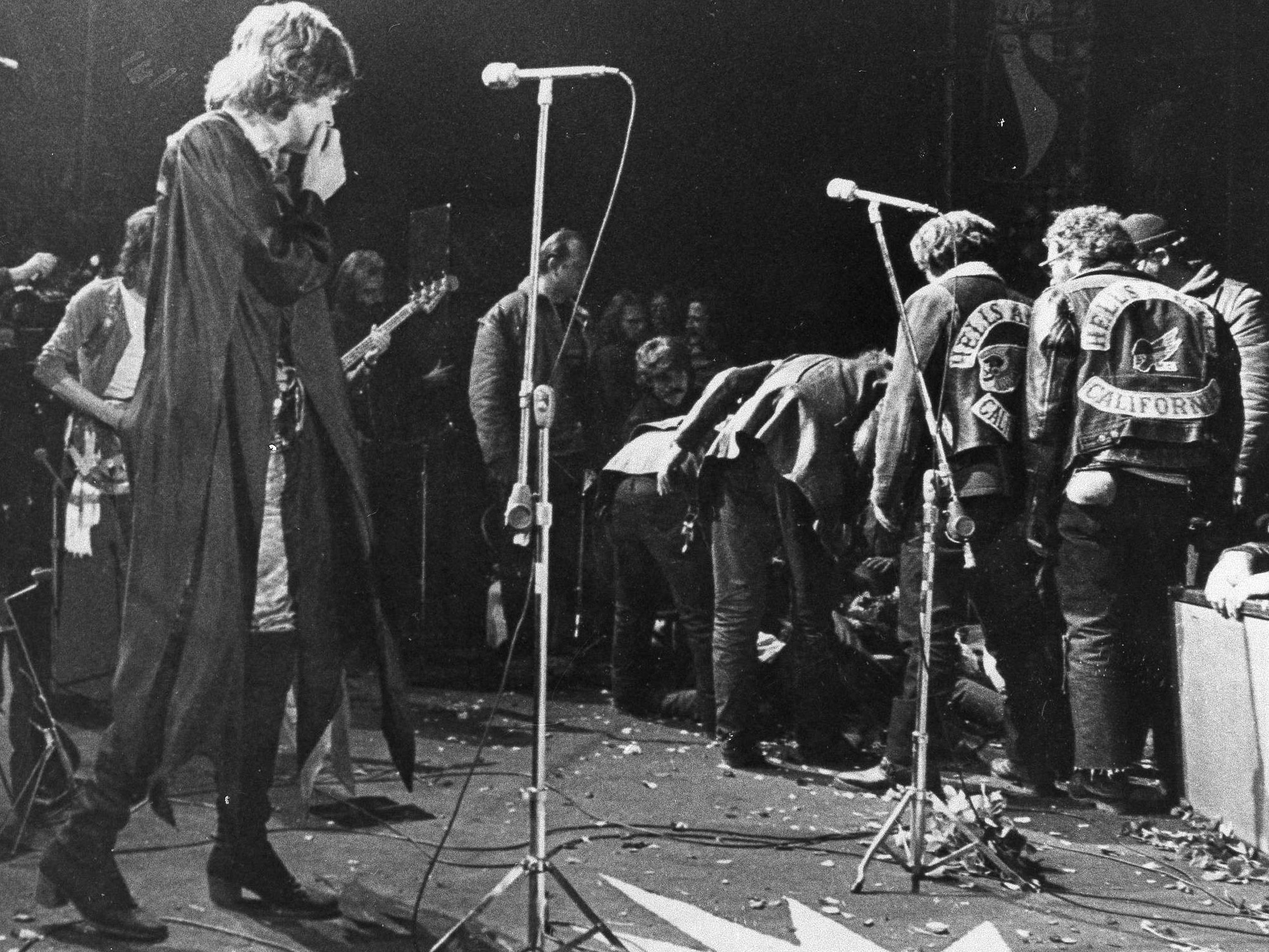
Jagger looks at the Hells Angels after an altercation during the concert

Hunter and Bredehoft traveled to Altamont by car with another couple, his friend Ronnie Brown and Brown's girlfriend, Judy. Hunter's sister Dixie had warned him about the violent racism still prevalent in rural areas, and Hunter took with him a Smith & Wesson revolver for protection. They arrived at Altamont at 2:00–2:30 pm. At some point in the day Hunter ingested moderate amounts of amphetamines and methamphetamine.

It was dark by the time the Rolling Stones took to the stage. The Hells Angels began further violence against the crowd by the time the band got to their third song, "Sympathy for the Devil". It was bad enough that the band stopped playing, and Jagger pleaded with the crowd: “Hey, people. Sisters, brothers and sisters, brothers and sisters. Come on now. That means everybody, just cool out. Will you cool out, everybody?" Richards called out: "Look – that guy there. If he doesn't stop it, man – listen, either those cats cool it, man, or we don't play. Come on." The situation calmed, and the band played what Richards described as "cool-down music": Jimmy Reed's blues number, "The Sun Is Shining".

As the Rolling Stones continued with their set, Hunter was near the front of the crowd, apart from Bredehoft. The mixed-race couple had been given dirty looks by the Hells Angels earlier in the day, and Hunter had been repelled when he tried to climb onto the stage. While the band played "Under My Thumb", Hunter climbed onto a speaker box for a better view, and an Angel grabbed his ear and hair and pulled him down. When Hunter pulled away from the biker, he was punched in the face. Hunter ran into the crowd, pursued by several Angels. He pulled his revolver from his pocket; although he raised it briefly in the direction of the stage, he turned and tried to go back into the crowd. Passaro, seeing the gun, pulled a knife from an ankle sheath and leapt onto Hunter's back, stabbing him multiple times. Several Angels surrounded the prostrate Hunter, kicking and hitting him as he lay dying. He was heard to say, "I wasn't going to shoot you."

The stabbing was not witnessed by the Rolling Stones, although they were aware of an altercation. Richards stopped playing and said into his microphone: "We're splitting. We're splitting if those cats don't stop beating up everyone in sight. I want them out of the way, man." Jagger, on hearing a request from someone in the crowd, called out: "We need a doctor ... now please. Look – could you let the doctor through, please? Somebody's been hurt ..." Cutler, the Stones' tour manager, also took to the microphone to ask the crowd to back away and sit down; he also called for a doctor to attend. Dr. Robert Hiatt heard the message and made his way to the spot. A Hells Angel picked up Hunter – still alive – and put him into Hiatt's arms; Hiatt carried him to the first aid post, where he was put into a station wagon and driven to the main medical tent. There were no facilities to treat Hunter on site, and the doctor at the medical tent realized Hunter was in need of surgery. An ambulance was called, but Hunter died at 6:30 pm, before it arrived. Bredehoft was distraught at the events; an ambulance driver calmed her down, then drove her to her parents' house, where he told them the news. The Rolling Stones did not realize someone had been killed in front of them, and they continued the concert. After they played a further eleven songs, they left the race track by helicopter. (Note: One of the songs they played was "Brown Sugar"; it was a new song from the Rolling Stones and the first time it had been played in public.)

== Aftermath and investigation ==
Hunter's autopsy identified sixteen stab wounds: nine to his head, two in his neck and five in his back. They varied from 2 3/4 to 4 1/4 inches (70 to 108 mm) in depth. He was buried a week after his death at a cemetery in Vallejo, California.

Three days after the concert, police pulled over a car in which Passaro was a passenger. They found bolt cutters, a crowbar, a pistol and Passaro's knife, which showed traces of blood. As he was on bail on theft and drug charges at the time, this was revoked, and he was incarcerated. Police knew from the start that a member of the Hells Angels was responsible for Hunter's death, although they had no way of knowing which of the Angels was responsible. They were informed that the Maysles brothers had filmed the event. Police told them that they needed to view the raw footage as soon as it was processed. David Maysles flew back to California with the film for them to view. From the jacket patches seen on the footage, they realized Hunter's assailant was from the Angels' San Francisco chapter. Police then interviewed chapter president Bob Roberts. He told investigators that Hunter had been on drugs and acting aggressively; he also said that he did not know who the biker was that has been involved in the stabbing, but he handed over Hunter's revolver, which one of the Angels had taken.

Between January 21 and April 30, 1970, Rolling Stone published four articles on the Altamont concert and Hunter's death. (Note: The articles were "Let It Bleed" and "Hype in the News", both published on January 21, 1970; "In the Aftermath of Altamont" published on February 7, 1970; and "What Went Wrong?", published on April 30, 1970.) Selvin believes that the journalists went further than the police investigation, interviewing more witnesses and looking more deeply into the circumstances and the people involved. Detective Sergeant Robert Donovan later said he read an advance copy of the first article (titled "Let it Bleed") several times, particularly the comments from a witness named in the article as "Paul". Police identified the man as Paul Cox, and he – as the first eyewitness they had identified – was interviewed on January 15. A Hells Angel called Julio Ortiz was the first main suspect, but when he showed them which person he was in the Maysles's film, they then began to look at Passaro; he was interviewed in prison on January 23. When shown a still of himself taken from the film, he denied it was him and said he thought it had been a biker from the Los Angeles chapter who was responsible for the killing. Police canvassed other eyewitnesses and showed them photographs taken from the film; several identified Passaro as the person who stabbed Hunter. On March 17, Passaro appeared in a police lineup; Cox identified him as Hunter's killer, although others, including Bredehoft, were unable to identify him. On March 2, Passaro was formally charged with Hunter's murder. The investigation took three months, and police interviewed more than a thousand witnesses.

Passaro's trial started on December 16, 1970, and lasted until January 23, 1971. He changed his appearance to appear more respectable, shaving off his drooping mustache and muttonchop whiskers, getting a haircut and wearing a suit. His lawyer was George Walker, a man of mixed African American and Nordic background who people at the trial thought looked like a Native American. Selvin writes that as he was defending a member of an all-white gang for the murder of a black man, the choice of Walker "was a brilliant play in race politics".

Cox appeared as a witness for the prosecution, but Walker dismantled much of his evidence, highlighting discrepancies between his testimony and the interview he gave to Rolling Stone. The Maysles's film was shown in evidence by the prosecution, but Walker was able to highlight the fact that Hunter was filmed holding a gun, which appeared silhouetted against the light-colored crocheted dress Bredehoft was wearing. Several of the witnesses stated that they saw Hunter draw the gun before Passaro attacked him. Passaro admitted that he stabbed Hunter, but stated he acted in self-defense. The jury deliberated for twelve hours before declaring him not guilty; he shouted, "Yeeeoooowww" as the verdict was given. Passaro was taken back to prison to finish the sentence he was serving at the time of his arrest.

== Legacy ==
While public opinion blamed the Hells Angels for Hunter's death, the bikers blamed the Rolling Stones for making them the target of attacks in the media; they were also upset when the group turned down a demand for money to pay for Passaro's defense. Angered, a biker with a pistol from the New York chapter waited outside a Manhattan hotel where Jagger was thought to be staying, but he was not there. A second attempted attack, intended to kill Jagger with a bomb, targeted his Long Island home. The night of the attempt, a bad storm capsized the boat the bombers were in, and they abandoned the plot. (Note: The information only came to light in the mid-1980s when an informant from the Hells Angels testified on the attempts.)

Passaro returned to his life with the Hells Angels. He spent more time in prison over the years until, in 1985, he was found drowned in Anderson Lake in Santa Clara County. He was carrying $10,000 in cash, and his car, a black Mercedes-Benz, was parked at the lakeside with the keys still inside. Selvin wrote that it is possible that he had been murdered.

In 2003, the Alameda County Sheriff's Office undertook a two-year investigation into the possibility of a second Hells Angel having taken part in the stabbing. Finding insufficient support for this hypothesis, and reaffirming that Passaro acted alone, the office closed the case on May 25, 2005.

The Maysles's film Gimme Shelter was released in 1970. Austerlitz states that, despite the involvement of the Rolling Stones in the production of the film, it "became the accepted account of the day, the official record of history". The Grateful Dead were upset by some of the criticism aimed at them in the articles in Rolling Stone; (Note: Much of the criticism appears in the article "Let It Bleed".) their response was to write "New Speedway Boogie", which appeared as the B-side of "Uncle John's Band". The events at Altamont and Hunter's death are referred to in verse five of Don McLean's 1971 song "American Pie":

So come on: Jack be nimble, Jack be quick!
Jack Flash sat on a candlestick
'Cause fire is the Devil's only friend
Oh, and as I watched him on the stage
My hands were clenched in fists of rage
No angel born in Hell
Could break that Satan spell
And as the flames climbed high into the night
To light the sacrificial rite
I saw Satan laughing with delight
The day the music died

== Notes and references ==
=== Sources ===
==== Books ====
- Austerlitz, Saul (2018a). Just a Shot Away: Peace, Love, and Tragedy with The Rolling Stones at Altamont. New York: Thomas Dunne Books. ISBN 978-1-2500-8319-7.
- Cohen, Rich (2016). The Sun and the Moon and the Rolling Stones. New York: Spiegel & Grau. ISBN 978-0-8041-7923-2.
- Cutler, Sam (2010). You Can't Always Get What You Want: My Life with the Rolling Stones, The Grateful Dead and Other Wonderful Reprobates. Toronto: ECW Press. ISBN 978-1-5502-2932-5.
- Hjort, Christopher (2007). Strange Brew: Eric Clapton and the British Blues Boom, 1965–1970. London: Jawbone Press. p. 249. ISBN 978-1-9060-0200-8.
- Ireland, Brian (2019). Woodstock and Altamont: The Music Festivals that Defined the 1960s. Bedford, Bedfordshire: Wymer Publishing. ISBN 978-1-9127-8219-2.
- Jones, Lesley-Ann (2023). The Stone Age: Sixty Years of the Rolling Stones. John Blake Publishing. ISBN 978-1-7894-6553-2.
- Marsden, William (2006). Angels of Death: Inside the Bikers' Global Crime Empire. London: Hodder & Stoughton. ISBN 978-0-3408-9831-4.
- McKeen, William (2000). Rock and Roll is Here to Stay: An Anthology. New York: Norton. ISBN 978-0-3930-4700-4.
- McNally, Dennis (2002). A Long Strange Trip: The Inside History of the Grateful Dead. New York: Broadway Books. ISBN 978-0-7679-1185-6.
- Norman, Philip (2012). The Stones: The Acclaimed Biography. London: HarperCollins. ISBN 978-0-0074-7706-7.
- Peters, Stephen (1999). What a Long, Strange Trip. New York: Thunder's Mouth Press. ISBN 978-1-5602-5233-7.
- Richardson, Peter (2015). No Simple Highway: A Cultural History of the Grateful Dead. New York: St. Martin's Griffin. ISBN 978-1-2500-8214-5.
- Santelli, Robert (1980). Aquarius Rising: The Rock Festival Years. New York: Dell Publishing. ISBN 978-0-4405-0956-1.
- Schuck, Raymond I.; Schuck, Ray, eds. (2012). Do You Believe in Rock and Roll?: Essays on Don McLean's "American Pie". Jefferson, North Carolina: McFarland. ISBN 978-0-7864-7105-8.
  - Burns, Joseph E. "A Long, Long Time Ago: A Lyrical Interpretation". In Schuck & Schuck (2012), pp. 15–48.
  - Schuck, Ray. "A Line by Line Analysis of a Classic Song". In Schuck & Schuck (2012), pp. 49–75.
- Selvin, Joel (2016). Altamont: The Rolling Stones, the Hells Angels, and the Inside Story of Rock's Darkest Day. New York: Dey St. ISBN 978-0-0624-4425-7.

==== Journals and magazines ====
- Austerlitz, Saul (July 9, 2018b). "Remembering Meredith Hunter, the Fan Killed at Altamont". Rolling Stone. Archived from the original on June 12, 2021.
- Burks, John (February 7, 1970). "In the Aftermath of Altamont". Rolling Stone. Archived from the original on July 3, 2022.
- Smith, David (March 27, 2005). "The Stage of Death". The Sunday Times Magazine. pp. 36–43.
- "The Rolling Stones at Altamont: What Went Wrong?". Rolling Stone. April 30, 1970. Archived from the original on August 4, 2020.
- "The Rolling Stones Disaster At Altamont: Hype in the News". Rolling Stone. January 21, 1970. Archived from the original on August 2, 2022.
- "The Rolling Stones Disaster at Altamont: Let It Bleed". Rolling Stone. January 21, 1970. Archived from the original on September 4, 2022.

==== News ====
- "A Hells Angel Held in Killing". San Francisco Chronicle. March 25, 1970. p. 30 – via Newspapers.com.
- Clines, Francis X. (November 28, 1969). "16,000 at Madison Square Garden Shout With Joy in Reaction to Sounds of Rolling Stones". The New York Times. p. 43.
- Gleason, Ralph (October 19, 1969). "Inequities in the Concerts". San Francisco Chronicle. p. 33 – via Newspapers.com.
- Lee, Henry K. (May 26, 2005). "Altamont 'Cold Case' is Being Closed". San Francisco Chronicle. p. B2 – via Newspapers.com.
- "Rolling Stones Open Tour With West Coast Concert". The New York Times. November 10, 1969. p. 59.

==== Websites ====
- "Consumer Price Index, 1800–". Federal Reserve Bank of Minneapolis.
- Johnston, Louis; Williamson, Samuel H. (2023). "What Was the U.S. GDP Then?". MeasuringWorth.

==== Media ====
Gimme Shelter (DVD). Warner Bros. 1970.
