= Games of the XXI Olympiad (album) =

Studio album by Black Cab
- Released: November 2014
- Genre: Indie rock
- Length: 67:23
- Label: Interstate 40 Music
- Producer: Woody Annison, Black Cab

Black Cab chronology
Call Signs (2009)	Games of the XXI Olympiad (2014)	明 (Akira) (2017)

Professional ratings
Review scores
Source	Rating
The Age	4.5/5 stars
The Australian	4.5/5 stars
Rolling Stone Australia	3.5/4 stars
The Courier-Mail	4/5 stars

Games of the XXI Olympiad is the fourth album by Melbourne electronica band Black Cab. It was released in 2014.

The album continues the theme of their 2009 Call Signs album, which was inspired by Cold War-era East Germany, with the new album themed on the 1976 Montreal Olympics, where a state-sanctioned regimen of performance-enhancing substances produced a generation of chemically superhuman East German athletes. A version of the album was prepared for release in 2012 but was abandoned when the band decided it was neither complete nor very good. Songs were stripped down and extended, in the process transforming "Supermädchen" from four minutes to almost ten.

The album, far more electronica-based than its predecessors, was produced in multiple sessions with different producers and mixers, including Woody Annison, Simon Polinski and former Death in Vegas member Tim Holmes. Two earlier singles, "Combat Boots" (2011) and "Sexy Polizei" (2010) were also included.

== Track listing ==
(all songs by Black Cab)

1. "Opening Ceremony" – 2:32
2. "Supermädchen" – 9:49
3. "Victorious" – 6:34
4. "Performance Center Obertauern" – 3:19
5. "Kornelia Ender" – 4:48 (about Kornelia Ender)
6. "Go Slow" – 6:07
7. "Problem Child" – 4:13
8. "Combat Boots" – 4:41
9. "Little Blue Ones" – 5:56
10. "My War" – 5:42
11. "Sexy Polizei" – 4:07
12. "State Plan 14.25" – 5:07
13. "Closing Ceremony" – 4:27

== Personnel ==
- James Lee – guitar, keyboards
- Andrew Coates – vocals, programming, keyboards
- Wes Holland – live drums

=== Additional musicians ===
- Steve Law – sequences, drones
- Shags Chamberlain – bass, moog
- Richard Andrew – juno, guitar, drums
- Anthony Paine – bass
- Alex Jarvis – guitar
- Dyko – electronic percussion
- Lucy Buckeridge – backing vocals
- Monique Brumby – backing vocals
- Raffaela Jungbauer – spoken word
