= Porter Bibb =

American financier, media producer and writer (1937–2025)

- Born: April 2, 1937; Louisville, Kentucky, U.S.
- Died: January 4, 2025 (aged 87); New York City, U.S.
- Education: Yale University
- Occupation: Investment banker
- Known for: journalist, publisher, film producer, author
- Spouse: Alexandra Penn Bibb

Porter Bibb (April 2, 1937 – January 4, 2025) was an American financier, media producer and writer. He is best known as the first publisher of Rolling Stone magazine.

== Life and career ==
Bibb was born in Louisville, Kentucky on April 2, 1937. He began his career as an investment banker specializing in media, entertainment, and technology ventures. He founded the first investment banking boutique in London in 1962. He worked on the team that began Bankers Trust's investment banking unit in 1977, which completed over 300 media and entertainment transactions in five years. For over 15 years, he was a senior partner and director of investment banking at Ladenburg Thalmann.

He attended Louisville Male High School and was a member of the Athenaeum Literary Association, a school-sponsored literary and social club. There he got to know another club member, Hunter S. Thompson, who would become an influential counterculture journalist.

Bibb convinced Albert and David Maysles to film the 1969 Woodstock Festival despite the bad weather and the withdrawal of Warner Bros.' financial backing. Bibb also convinced The Rolling Stones to perform at the Altamont Free Concert in 1969, and he produced the 1970 documentary film of the event, Gimme Shelter.

As a journalist, Bibb was a White House correspondent for Newsweek magazine, the first publisher of Rolling Stone magazine, and a corporate development director for The New York Times Company. He was the author of several books, including a best-selling biography of Ted Turner (Random House, 1993 and 1997).

He graduated from Yale University with a B.A. in History and earned graduate certificates from the Harvard Business School and London School of Economics.

Bibb was a direct descendant of the first two governors of Alabama: William Wyatt Bibb (1781–1820) and Thomas Bibb (1783–1839).

Bibb died of prostate cancer in New York City, on January 4, 2025, at the age of 87.

== Books authored ==
- CB Bible, Doubleday, 1976
- Disco Inferno: An Illustrated Novel, Dolphin, 1979
- It Ain't As Easy As It Looks: Ted Turner's Amazing Story, Crown, 1993

== Filmography ==
- Gimme Shelter (1970) – associate producer
- Year of the Woman (1973) – producer
