= Under My Thumb =

1966 song by The Rolling Stones

- Japanese single picture sleeve

Song by the Rolling Stones

from the album Aftermath
- Released: 15 April 1966
- Recorded: 6–9 March 1966
- Genre: Rock; soul
- Length: 3:41
- Label: Decca
- Songwriter: Jagger/Richards
- Producer: Andrew Loog Oldham

Aftermath track listing
- 14 tracks Side one: 1. "Mother's Little Helper"; 2. "Stupid Girl"; 3. "Lady Jane"; 4. "Under My Thumb"; 5. "Doncha Bother Me"; 6. "Goin' Home"; Side two: 7. "Flight 505"; 8. "High and Dry"; 9. "Out of Time"; 10. "It's Not Easy"; 11. "I Am Waiting"; 12. "Take It or Leave It"; 13. "Think"; 14. "What to Do"

"Under My Thumb" is a song recorded by the English rock band the Rolling Stones. Written by Mick Jagger and Keith Richards, "Under My Thumb" features a marimba played by Brian Jones. Although it was never released as a single in English-speaking countries, it is one of the band's more popular songs from the mid-1960s and appears on several best-of compilations, such as Hot Rocks 1964–1971. It was included as the fourth track on both the American and United Kingdom versions of the band's 1966 studio album Aftermath.

The group frequently performed "Under My Thumb" on their American Tour 1981 and European Tour 1982 as the opening number at each concert. It was the song being performed by the group at the Altamont Free Concert in December 1969 during which the killing of Meredith Hunter took place.

== Lyrics and music ==
Like many of the songs from the Aftermath period, "Under My Thumb" uses more novel instrumentation than that featured on previous Stones records. Fuzz bass lines were added by Bill Wyman. Marimba riffs, played by Brian Jones, provide the song's most prominent hook.

The song is said to be an examination of a sexual power struggle, in which Jagger's lyrics celebrate the success of finally having controlled and gained leverage over a previously pushy, dominating woman. Savouring the successful "taming of the shrew" and comparing the woman in question to a "pet", a "Siamese cat" and a "squirming dog", the lyrics provoked some negative reactions, especially amongst feminists, who objected to what they took as the suppressive sexual politics of the male narrator. American humanities professor Camille Paglia, for example, reported that her admiration and defence of "Under My Thumb" marked the beginning of a rift between her and the radical feminists of the late 1960s. Jagger later reflected on the track in a 1995 interview with Rolling Stone: "It's a bit of a jokey number, really. It's not really an anti-feminist song any more than any of the others ... Yes, it's a caricature, and it's in reply to a girl who was a very pushy woman". Starting with the 1969 tour, Jagger changed the references of "girl" in the lyric to "woman".

In 2021, Like a Rolling Stone Revisited: Une relecture de Dylan [A Re-reading of Dylan] by Jean-Michel Buizard—a book devoted to Bob Dylan—takes a diversion through "Under My Thumb" and offers a new interpretation of the song, departing from a first-degree reading of it. Buizard describes that in the blues tradition, of which the Stones are the heirs, the guitar is the eternal companion of the bluesman, sometimes even personified, such as Lucille, B. B. King's guitar, to which he dedicated a song (Lucille, 1968). He argues that "Under My Thumb" extends this tradition: "It's never about a real woman, but simply about this instrument that the guitarist has to tame, which probably gets him into trouble at first, but which he finally manages to dominate with his fingertips—under his thumb!"

The Boomtown Rats released a version of this Jagger/Richards song with new lyrics by Bob Geldof, mildly retitled "Under Their Thumb".

== Commercial performance ==
According to the Associated Press and United Press International, "Under My Thumb" was among the most popular songs that the Stones performed during their 1969 appearances at Madison Square Garden and The Forum.

== Critical reception ==
Writing for the Port Angeles Evening News in 1971, critic Randy Peters considered "Under My Thumb" to be a "Stone's classic". In a 1978 retrospective review, music critic John Andrew Prime noted "Under My Thumb" for having "certain twists and turns" which rescued it from "the doldrums". That same year, staff writer Terry Orme wrote for The Salt Lake Tribune that the song reflected the Stones "at their offensive best", stating that the Stones had made important commentary "on the mentality of a culture". Writing for The Boston Globe in 1969, contributing critic William Alford referred to the song as being about "joyously insecure revenge".

An article in the Courier-Journal in 1971 mentioned "Under my Thumb" among Rolling Stones songs that portray the "worst picture[s] of women ... where sexual exploitation reaches unique heights." Writing for the Lincoln Gazette in 1972, musician Dave Downing said stereotyping and oversimplification were "very difficult to avoid" in rock music, calling "Under My Thumb" a "piece of art, not a political doctrine".

== Personnel ==
According to authors Philippe Margotin & Jean-Michel Guesdon:

The Rolling Stones

- Mick Jagger – vocals
- Keith Richards – acoustic guitar, lead guitar, fuzz bass
- Brian Jones – marimba
- Bill Wyman – bass
- Charlie Watts – drums

Additional musicians

- Ian Stewart – piano
- Unidentified musician(s) – finger snaps, hand claps

== Altamont incident ==
The song was being played during the killing of Meredith Hunter at the infamous Altamont Free Concert in 1969. Visibly rattled by the violence in front of the stage, Jagger can be heard to sing, "I pray that it's all right", instead of the usual "It feels all right." The Stones were just finishing up the song when a fight broke out between Hells Angels on the security detail and concert-goers, ultimately culminating in the stabbing of Hunter by Hells Angel Alan Passaro after Hunter pulled out a revolver.

It is a common misconception that Hunter was stabbed while the band was playing "Sympathy for the Devil", which was actually performed earlier in the set. The events appear in the documentary film Gimme Shelter (1970).

== Cover versions ==
"Under My Thumb" has been the subject of multiple cover versions, some of which have charted in the US and UK. The song was subject to covers by Del Shannon and Wayne Gibson in 1966. Shannon's version reached number 129 on the Billboard Bubbling Under Hot 100 chart. Gibson's version failed to chart in 1966, but later charted at number 17 in the UK in 1974 after gaining popularity in the Northern Soul scene.

In response to the Rolling Stones' Redlands bust in 1967, The Who recorded a cover version of "Under My Thumb".

Doom metal pioneers Pentagram released a cover as a single in 1974. American singer and actress Tina Turner covered "Under My Thumb" for her album Acid Queen (1975). It was released on United Artists Records as the fourth and last single in Australia to promote her Australian tour in 1977. Produced by Danny Diante and Spencer Proffer, the single reached No. 80 on the Kent Music Report. "Under My Thumb" was also covered by The Hounds in 1979, with their rendition reaching number 110 on the Billboard Bubbling Under 100 chart. That same year, the Canadian band Streetheart released a disco-hybrid cover version from the album Under Heaven, Over Hell; it peaked at number 20 in 1980 on the RPM singles chart.

In 1988, Sananda Maitreya, then going by Terence Trent D’Arby, performed a cover of the song during an episode of Saturday Night Live. While not part of the album he was promoting, Introducing the Hardline According to Terence Trent D'Arby, it would be included on the B-side to the hit single “Sign Your Name” as well as for an episode of the Peel Sessions.

== Certifications ==
Certifications for "Under My Thumb"
Region	Certification	Certified units/sales
United Kingdom (BPI)	Silver	200,000^{‡}
^{‡} Sales+streaming figures based on certification alone.
