= Pharmacy Records =

- Founder: Richard Andrew
- Distributor(s): MGM Distribution
- Genre: Various
- Country of origin: Australia
- Location: Fitzroy, Victoria
- Official website: Pharmacy Records

Pharmacy Records is an independent record label based in Melbourne, Australia, and run by Richard Andrew of Registered Nurse.

Pharmacy Records is distributed through MGM Distribution in Australia and through Narwhal Records in the UK.

== Notable artists ==
- Black Cab
- The Fergs
- Grand Salvo
- Mississippi Barry
- Registered Nurse
- Silver Ray
- Princess One Point Five
- Tugboat
- Diving Bell

== See also ==
- List of record labels
