= Altamont Free Concert =

1969 music festival in northern California

Altamont Speedway Free Festival
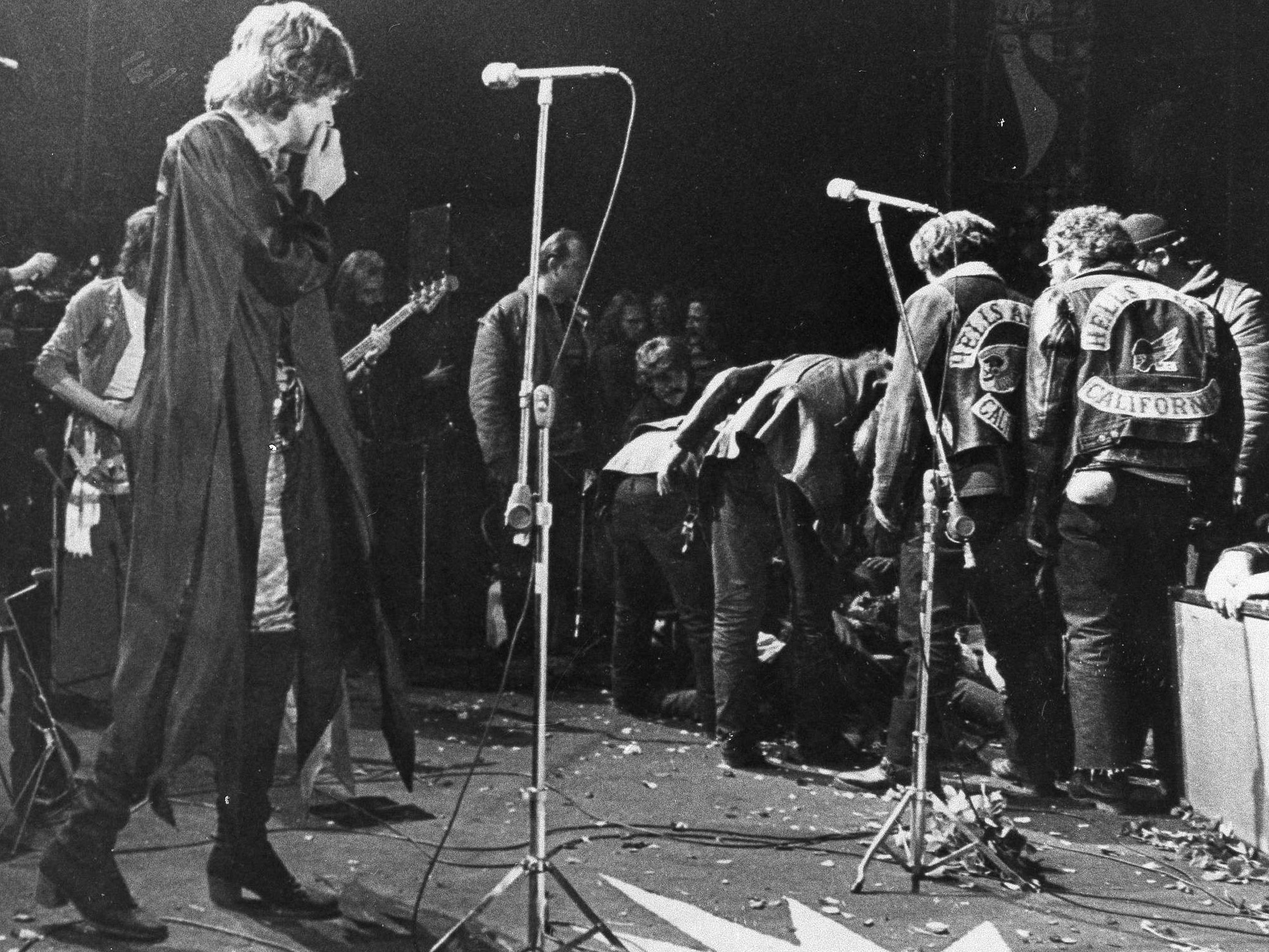
- Mick Jagger stops performing to address Hells Angels
- Genre: Rock and folk, including blues-rock, folk rock, jazz fusion, Latin rock, country rock, and psychedelic rock styles
- Dates: December 6, 1969 (56 years ago)
- Locations: Altamont Speedway, Tracy, California, U.S.
- Coordinates: 37°44′22″N 121°33′40″W
- Founders: Jorma Kaukonen, Spencer Dryden, Grateful Dead
- Attendance: 300,000 (estimated)

Location in California

The Altamont Speedway Free Festival was a counterculture rock concert in the United States, held on Saturday, December 6, 1969, at the Altamont Speedway outside of Tracy, California. Approximately 300,000 attended the concert, with some anticipating that it would be a "Woodstock West". The Woodstock festival had taken place in Bethel, New York, in mid-August, almost four months earlier.

The event is remembered for its use of Hells Angels as security and its significant violence, including the killing of Meredith Hunter and three accidental deaths: two from a hit-and-run car crash, and one from a drowning incident in an irrigation canal. Scores were injured, numerous cars were stolen (and subsequently abandoned), and there was extensive property damage. During the Rolling Stones' headline performance, violence erupted close to the stage, resulting in the fatal stabbing of Hunter, a spectator. MusicRadar noted that the tragedy, captured on film in Gimme Shelter, eclipsed the event and marked a dark ending for the 1960s counterculture. The concert featured performances (in order of appearance) by Santana, Jefferson Airplane, The Flying Burrito Brothers, and Crosby, Stills, Nash & Young (CSNY), with The Rolling Stones taking the stage as the final act. The Grateful Dead were also scheduled to perform after CSNY, but canceled shortly before their scheduled appearance, citing the increasing violence at the venue. "That's the way things went at Altamont—so badly that the Grateful Dead, the prime organizers and movers of the festival, didn't even get to play," wrote staff at Rolling Stone magazine in a detailed narrative on the event, terming it, in an additional follow-up piece, "rock and roll's all-time worst day, December 6th, a day when everything went perfectly wrong."

Filmmakers Albert and David Maysles shot footage of the event and incorporated it into the 1970 documentary film titled Gimme Shelter.

== Background ==
=== Jefferson Airplane's account ===
According to Jefferson Airplane's Spencer Dryden, the idea for "a kind of Woodstock West" began when he and bandmate Jorma Kaukonen discussed the staging of a free concert with the Grateful Dead and Rolling Stones in Golden Gate Park. Referring to the Stones, Dryden said, "Next to the Beatles they were the biggest rock and roll band in the world, and we wanted them to experience what we were experiencing in San Francisco."

As plans were being finalized, Jefferson Airplane were on the road, and by early December they were in Florida, believing the concert plans for Golden Gate Park were proceeding. But by December 4, the plans had broken down, in Paul Kantner's account, because the city and police departments were unhelpful, reflecting the innate antagonism between the hippies of Haight-Ashbury and the authorities. Sears Point International Raceway in Sonoma was then the venue, but its owners wanted $100,000 in escrow from the Rolling Stones.

At the last moment, Dick Carter offered his Altamont Speedway in eastern Alameda County for the festival. Jefferson Airplane flew out of Miami on December 5. Kantner said the location was taken in a spirit of desperation: "There was no way to control it, no supervision or order." According to Grace Slick, "The vibes were bad. Something was very peculiar, not particularly bad, just real peculiar. It was that kind of hazy, abrasive and unsure day. I had expected the loving vibes of Woodstock but that wasn't coming at me. This was a whole different thing."

=== Rolling Stones and the Grateful Dead's account ===
During the Rolling Stones' 1969 U.S. tour, many (including journalists) felt that the ticket prices were far too high. In answer to this criticism, the Rolling Stones decided to end their tour with a free concert in San Francisco.

The concert was originally scheduled to be held at San Jose State University's practice field, as there had recently been a three-day outdoor free festival there with 52 bands and 80,000 attendees. Dirt Cheap Productions was asked to help secure the property again for the Rolling Stones and Grateful Dead to play a free concert. The Stones and the Dead were told the city of San Jose was not in the mood for another large concert and the grounds were out of bounds. Golden Gate Park in San Francisco was next on the list. However, a previously scheduled Chicago Bears–San Francisco 49ers football game at Kezar Stadium, located in Golden Gate Park, made that venue impractical, and permits were never issued for the concert. The venue was then changed to the Sears Point Raceway near Sonoma. However, a dispute with Sears Point's owner, Filmways, arose over a $300,000 up-front cash deposit from the Rolling Stones and film distribution rights, so the festival was moved once again. The Altamont Raceway, just outside of Tracy, was chosen at the suggestion of its owner, local businessman Dick Carter. The concert was to take place on Saturday, December 6; the location was switched on the night of Thursday, December 4.

In making preparations, Grateful Dead manager Rock Scully and concert organizer Michael Lang helicoptered over the site before making the selection, much as Lang had done when the Woodstock Festival was moved at the last moment from Wallkill to Bethel, New York.

The hasty move resulted in numerous logistical problems, including a lack of facilities such as portable toilets and medical tents. The move also created a problem for the stage design; instead of being on top of a rise, which characterized the geography at Sears Point, at Altamont the stage would now be at the bottom of a slope. The Rolling Stones' stage manager on the 1969 tour, Chip Monck, explained that "the stage was one metre high – 39 inches for us – and [at Sears Point] it was on the top of a hill, so all the audience pressure was back upon them". Because of the short notice for the change of location, the stage could not be changed. "We weren't working with scaffolding, we were working in an older fashion with parallels. You could probably have put another stage below it...but nobody had one," Monck said.

Because the stage was so low, members of the Hells Angels motorcycle club, led by Oakland chapter head Ralph "Sonny" Barger, were asked to surround the stage to provide security.

== Security ==
By some accounts, the Hells Angels were hired as security by the management of the Rolling Stones, on the recommendation of the Grateful Dead and Jefferson Airplane (who both had previously used the Angels for security at performances without incident), for $500 worth of beer. This story has been denied by some parties who were directly involved. According to the road manager of the Rolling Stones' 1969 US Tour, Sam Cutler, "the only agreement there ever was ... the Angels would make sure nobody tampered with the generators, but that was the extent of it. But there was no way 'They're going to be the police force' or anything like that. That's all bollocks." The deal was made at a meeting including Cutler, Grateful Dead manager Rock Scully, and Pete Knell, a member of the Hells Angels' San Francisco chapter. According to Cutler, the arrangement was that all the bands were supposed to share the $500 beer cost, "[but] the person who paid it was me, and I never got it back, to this day."

Hells Angels member Bill "Sweet William" Fritsch recalled this exchange he had with Cutler at a meeting prior to the concert, in which Cutler had asked them to provide security:

Fritsch: "We don't police things. We're not a security force. We go to concerts to enjoy ourselves and have fun."
Cutler: "Well, what about helping people out—you know, giving directions and things?"
Fritsch: "Sure, we can do that."

When Cutler asked how they would like to be paid, William replied, "We like beer." In the documentary Gimme Shelter, Sonny Barger states that the Hells Angels were not interested in policing the event, and that organizers had told him that the Angels would be required to do little more than sit on the edge of the stage, drink beer, and make sure there were not any murders or rapes occurring.

In 2009, Cutler explained his decision to use the Angels.

I was talking with them, because I was interested in the security of my band—everyone's security, for that matter. In the country of the blind, the one-eyed man is king. They were the only people who were strong and together. [They had to protect the stage] because it was descending into absolute chaos. Who was going to stop it?

Grateful Dead manager Rock Scully said that if the Angels hadn't been on the stage, "that whole crowd could have easily passed out, and rolled down onto the stage. There was no barrier."

Stefan Ponek, who helped organize the event, hosted a December 7, 1969, KSAN-FM radio broadcast of a four-hour, "day after" post-concert telephone call-in forum, provided the following for the 2000 release (the four-hour recording is included) of the Gimme Shelter DVD:

What we learned in the broadcast was pretty much startling: These guys—the Angels—had been hired and paid with $500 of beer, on a truck with ice, to essentially bring in the Stones and keep people off the stage. That was the understanding, that was the deal. And it seemed like there was not a lot of disagreement over that; that seemed to emerge as a fact, because it became rather apparent that the Stones didn't know what kind of people they were dealing with.

The Gimme Shelter DVD contains extensive excerpts from that broadcast. A Hells Angels member who identified himself as "Pete, from Hells Angels San Francisco" (most likely Pete Knell, president of the San Francisco chapter), says "they offered us $500 worth of beer [to] go there and take care of the stage ... we took this $500 worth of beer to do it." Sonny Barger, who also called into the KSAN forum, states: "We were told by one of the [other Hells Angels] clubs if we showed up down there [and] sat on the stage and drink some beer ... that the Stones manager or somebody had bought for us." In his lengthy call, Barger mentions the beer deal yet again:

I ain't no cop, I ain't never going to ever pretend to be a cop. And you know what, I didn't go there to police nothing, man. They told me if I could sit on the edge of the stage so nobody would climb over me, you know, I could drink beer until the show was over. And that's what I went there to do.

A woman who called in to the program revealed that she had seen at least five fist fights from her vantage point near the stage and that the Angels were involved in all of them. She also described a general uncaring attitude toward people who clearly needed help; a girl who was dragged across the stage by her hair, another who was on a bad acid trip and bystanders kicked and walked on her. She said she felt having the Angels as "security" was an irresponsible move because "we were all in terror of them". When she tried to speak about this at the concert, she was warned to be quiet by the people around her, for fear of being beaten. At this point, KSAN's Scoop Nisker mentioned the bystander effect and the murder of Kitty Genovese.

Emmett Grogan (founder of the radical community-action group the Diggers), who was intimately involved in the organization of the event (especially at the two earlier-planned venues), confirmed the $500 beer arrangement on that same KSAN forum with Ponek.

"Pete" also tells host Ponek that the Angels were hired by Cutler because of some rowdy, anxious on-stage incidents during the Stones' Oakland and Miami concerts weeks earlier. As security guards, Pete said "we ain't into that security", but that they agreed after the beer offer. He also claimed that, other than being told to "just keep people off the stage," Cutler gave the Hells Angels very little specific instructions for stage security: "They didn't say nothing to us about any of that." And although the Angels are not security guards, "If we say we're going to do something, we do it. If we decide to do it, it's done. No matter what, how far we have to go to do it." The similar lack of detailed security instructions by the concert's management was also mentioned by Barger during his telephone call-in.

Altamont Speedway owner Dick Carter had hired hundreds of professional, plainclothes security guards, ostensibly more for the purpose of protecting his property rather than for the safety and well-being of the concertgoers. Barger mentions these guards, as identified by their wearing of "little white buttons" on "civilian clothes".

Political scientist and cultural critic James Miller believes that since Ken Kesey had invited the Hells Angels to one of his outdoor Acid Tests, the hippies had viewed the bikers unrealistically, idealizing them as "noble savages" and thus "outlaw brothers of the counterculture". Miller also maintains that the Rolling Stones may have been misled by their experience with a British contingent of self-described "Hells Angels", a non-outlaw group of admirers of American biker gear who had provided nonviolent security at a free Stones concert earlier that year in Hyde Park, London. Cutler, however, denies ever having had any illusions about the true nature of Californian Hells Angels. "That's another canard foisted on the world by the press", he said, but Rock Scully remembers explaining to the Stones what the "real" Angels were like after watching the Hyde Park concert.

== Situation deteriorates ==
The first act on the stage, Santana, gave a performance that generally went smoothly; however, over the course of the day, the mood of both the crowd and the Angels became progressively agitated and violent. The Angels had been drinking their free beer all day in front of the stage, and most were very drunk. The crowd had also become antagonistic and unpredictable, attacking each other, the Angels, and the performers. A Mick Jagger biographer, Anthony Scaduto, in Mick Jagger: Everybody's Lucifer, wrote that the only time the crowd seemed to calm down to any degree was during a set by the country-rocking Flying Burrito Brothers. However, Denise Jewkes, lead singer of the local San Francisco rock band The Ace of Cups, six months pregnant, was hit in the head by an empty beer bottle thrown from the crowd and suffered a skull fracture. The Angels proceeded to arm themselves with sawed-off pool cues and motorcycle chains to drive the crowd further back from the stage.

After the crowd (perhaps accidentally) toppled one of the Angels' motorcycles, the Angels became even more aggressive, including toward the performers. Marty Balin of Jefferson Airplane jumped off the stage to try to sort out the problem, only to be knocked unconscious by an Angel during the band's set. When Jefferson Airplane guitarist Paul Kantner sarcastically thanked the Angels for knocking the singer out, Angel Bill Fritsch took hold of a microphone and argued with him about it. Grateful Dead had been scheduled to play between Crosby, Stills, Nash & Young, and the Rolling Stones, but after hearing about the Balin incident from Santana drummer Michael Shrieve, they refused to play and left the venue, citing the quickly degenerating security situation.

During Crosby, Stills, Nash & Young's set, Stephen Stills was reported to be repeatedly stabbed in the leg by a "stoned-out" Hells Angel, with a sharpened bicycle spoke.

By the time the Rolling Stones took the stage in the early evening, the mood had taken a decidedly ugly turn as numerous fights had erupted between Angels and crowd members and within the crowd itself.

The Rolling Stones waited until sundown to perform. Stanley Booth stated that part of the reason for the delay was that Bill Wyman had missed the helicopter ride to the venue. When the Stones began their set, a tightly packed group of between 4,000 and 5,000 people were jammed to the very edge of the stage, and many attempted to climb onto it.

== Killing of Meredith Hunter ==
Rolling Stones lead singer Mick Jagger, who had already been punched in the head by a concertgoer within seconds of emerging from his helicopter, was visibly intimidated by the unruly situation and urged everyone to, "Just be cool down in the front there, don't push around." During the third song, "Sympathy for the Devil", a fight erupted in the front of the crowd at the foot of the stage, prompting the Stones to pause their set while the Angels restored order. After a lengthy pause and another appeal for calm, the band restarted the song and continued their set with less incident until the start of "Under My Thumb". At this point, some of the Hells Angels got into a scuffle with Meredith Hunter, age 18, when he attempted to get onstage with other fans. One of the Hells Angels grabbed Hunter's head, punched him, and chased him back into the crowd.

After a minute's pause, Hunter returned to the stage where, according to Gimme Shelter producer Porter Bibb, Hunter's girlfriend Patty Bredehoft found him and tearfully begged him to calm down and move further back in the crowd with her, but he was reportedly enraged, irrational and "so high he could barely walk". Rock Scully, who could see the audience clearly from the top of a truck by the stage, said of Hunter, "I saw what he was looking at, that he was crazy, he was on drugs, and that he had murderous intent. There was no doubt in my mind that he intended to do terrible harm to Mick or somebody in the Rolling Stones, or somebody on that stage."

Following his initial scuffle with the Angels as he tried to climb onstage, Hunter, as seen in concert footage wearing a bright lime-green suit, returned to the front of the crowd and drew a long-barreled .22 caliber revolver from inside his jacket. Hells Angel Alan Passaro, seeing Hunter drawing the revolver, drew a knife from his belt and charged Hunter, stabbing him sixteen times in the head, neck, and back, killing him.

Footage shot by Eric Saarinen, who was on stage taking pictures of the crowd, and Baird Bryant, who climbed atop a bus, appears in the Gimme Shelter documentary. Saarinen was unaware of having caught the killing on film. This was discovered more than a week later when raw footage was screened in the New York offices of the Maysles Brothers. In the film sequence, lasting about two seconds, a two-meter (six-foot) opening in the crowd appears, leaving Bredehoft in the center. Hunter enters the opening from the left. His hand rises toward the stage, and the silhouette of a revolver is clearly seen against Bredehoft's light-colored vest. Passaro is seen entering from the right and delivering two stabs with his knife as he pushes him off-screen; the opening then closes around Bredehoft, concealing the remaining 14 stabbings. Witnesses reported Hunter was stomped on by several Hells Angels while he was on the ground. The gun was recovered and turned over to police. Hunter's autopsy confirmed he was high on methamphetamine when he died. Passaro was arrested and tried for murder in the summer of 1971, but was acquitted after a jury viewed concert footage showing Hunter brandishing the revolver and concluded that Passaro had acted in self-defense.

The Rolling Stones were aware of the skirmish, but not the stabbing ("You couldn't see anything, it was just another scuffle", Jagger tells David Maysles during film editing). But it soon became apparent they could see something of what had happened because the band stopped playing mid-song and Jagger was heard calling into his microphone, "We've really got someone hurt here... is there a doctor?" After a few minutes the band began playing again and eventually completed their set. Jagger told Maysles they all agreed that if they abandoned the show at that point, the crowd would have become even more unruly, perhaps degenerating into a full-scale riot.

In 2003, the Alameda County Sheriff's Office initiated a two-year investigation into the possibility of a second Hells Angel having taken part in the stabbing. Finding insufficient support for this hypothesis, and reaffirming that Passaro acted alone, the office closed the case for good on May 25, 2005.

== Reactions ==
The Altamont concert is often contrasted with the Woodstock Festival that took place less than four months earlier. While Woodstock represented "peace and love", Altamont came to be viewed as the end of the hippie era and the de facto conclusion of late-1960s American youth culture: "Altamont became, whether fairly or not, a symbol for the death of the Woodstock Nation." Rock music critic Robert Christgau wrote in 1972 that "Writers focus on Altamont not because it brought on the end of an era but because it provided such a complex metaphor for the way an era ended." Writing for The New Yorker in 2015, Richard Brody argued that what Altamont ended was "the idea that, left to their own inclinations and stripped of the trappings of the wider social order, the young people of the new generation will somehow spontaneously create a higher, gentler, more loving grassroots order. What died at Altamont is the Rousseauian dream itself.".

The music magazine Rolling Stone, in a 14-page, 11-author article on the event entitled "The Rolling Stones Disaster at Altamont: Let It Bleed" published in their January 21, 1970, issue, stated that "Altamont was the product of diabolical egotism, hype, ineptitude, money manipulation, and, at base, a fundamental lack of concern for humanity". The article covered the many issues with the event's organization and was very critical of the organizers and the Rolling Stones; one writer stated: "what an enormous thrill it would have been for an Angel to kick Mick Jagger's teeth down his throat." Another follow-up piece in Rolling Stone called the Altamont event "rock and roll's all-time worst day". In Esquire magazine, Ralph J. Gleason observed, "The day The Rolling Stones played there, the name [Altamont] became etched in the minds of millions of people who love pop music and who hate it as well. If the name 'Woodstock' has come to denote the flowering of one phase of the youth culture, 'Altamont' has come to mean the end of it."

The film Gimme Shelter was criticized by reviewers such as Pauline Kael and Vincent Canby for portraying the Stones too sympathetically, and for staging a concert for the sole reason that it could be filmed, despite all the problems leading up to it. Salon's Michael Sragow, writing in 2000, said many of the critics took their cues from the Rolling Stone review, which heavily blamed the filmmakers for being part of a "staged event" so that the Rolling Stones could profit from making a "concert" film. Sragow pointed out numerous errors in the Rolling Stone coverage and added that the Maysles did not make "major motion pictures" in the traditional way; instead, a variety of factors contributed to the tragedy.

The Rolling Stones' Keith Richards was relatively sanguine about the show, calling it "basically well-handled, but lots of people were tired and a few tempers got frayed" and "on the whole, a good concert."

The Grateful Dead wrote several songs about, or in response to, what lyricist Robert Hunter called "the Altamont affair", including "New Speedway Boogie" (featuring the line "One way or another, this darkness got to give") and "Mason's Children". Both songs were written and recorded during sessions for the early 1970 album Workingman's Dead, but "Mason's Children" was not included on the album.

Altamont also inspired the Blue Öyster Cult song "Transmaniacon MC" ("MC" means "motorcycle club"), the opening track of their first album.

The incident is mentioned in the film The Cable Guy (1996), in a scene where Jim Carrey's character, Chip Douglas, performs "Somebody to Love" on karaoke: "You might recognize this song as performed by Jefferson Airplane, in a little rockumentary called Gimme Shelter, about the Rolling Stones and their nightmare at Altamont. That night the Oakland chapter of the Hells Angels had their way. Tonight, it's my turn."

In 2004, Australian electronic psych group Black Cab released their debut LP Altamont Diary, a concept album based on the concert and its cultural fallout. The LP features a cover of "New Speedway Boogie".

Altamont is also referenced by Don McLean in the song "American Pie" in the song's fifth verse, the majority of which contains symbols related to Altamont: "Jack Flash", a reference to San Francisco ("Candlestick", though that venue was unrelated to the actual concert), (Sympathy for) "the Devil", an enraged spectator watching something on a stage, and an "angel born in Hell". McLean officially refused to confirm or deny the song's ties to Altamont until he sold his songwriting notes in 2015. Within the context of the song, Altamont served as the culmination of a period that had begun with the plane crash that killed Buddy Holly, Ritchie Valens and the Big Bopper in February 1959, during which "things (were) heading in the wrong direction" and life was "becoming less idyllic."

In 2008, a former FBI agent said that some members of the Hells Angels had conspired to murder Mick Jagger in retribution for the Rolling Stones' lack of support following the concert, and for the negative portrayal of the Angels in the Gimme Shelter film. The conspirators reportedly used a boat to approach a residence where Jagger was staying on Long Island, New York, the plot failing when the boat was nearly sunk by a storm. Jagger's spokesperson has refused to comment on the matter.

Footage of performances from the concert

In January 2022, the Library of Congress shared a 30-minute clip of soundless footage shot from the stage at Altamont. The Library obtained the footage from the Prelinger Archives.

== Set list ==
=== Santana ===
- "Savor"
- "Jin-go-lo-ba"
- "Evil Ways"
- "Conquistadore Rides Again"
- "Persuasion"
- "Soul Sacrifice"
- "Gumbo"

=== Jefferson Airplane ===
- "We Can Be Together"
- "The Other Side of This Life" (During the performance of this song, Marty Balin was struck by a member of the Hells Angels, causing a temporary halt to the music.)
- "Somebody to Love"
- "3/5 of a Mile in 10 Seconds"
- "Greasy Heart"
- "White Rabbit"
- "Come Back Baby"
- "The Ballad of You and Me and Pooneil"
- "Volunteers"

=== The Flying Burrito Brothers ===
- "Lucille"
- "To Love Somebody"
- "Six Days on the Road"
- "High Fashion Queen"
- "Cody, Cody"
- "Lazy Day"
- "Bony Moronie"
- "Close Up The Honky Tonks"
- "Sweet Mental Revenge"

=== Crosby, Stills, Nash & Young ===
- "Black Queen"
- "Pre-Road Downs"
- "Long Time Gone"
- "Down by the River"
- "Sea of Madness"

=== The Rolling Stones ===
- "Jumpin' Jack Flash"
- "Carol"
- "Sympathy for the Devil" (Interrupted by numerous fights near the stage, causing the band to stop and then restart the song.)
- "The Sun Is Shining"
- "Stray Cat Blues"
- "Love in Vain"
- "Under My Thumb" (Stopped following the stabbing of Meredith Hunter, then restarted; after this, the violence subsided for the remainder of the concert.)
- "Brown Sugar" (Debut live performance of the song; the studio version had been recorded only two days earlier in Muscle Shoals, Alabama.)
- "Midnight Rambler"
- "Live with Me" (The scene in the film showing a naked woman attempting to climb onto the stage actually occurs during this song, though it is shown while "Sympathy for the Devil" is played. The performance of the song is also faintly heard in the background as the medical intern talks about Meredith Hunter's death.)
- "Gimme Shelter"
- "Little Queenie"
- "(I Can't Get No) Satisfaction"
- "Honky Tonk Women"
- "Street Fighting Man"

== See also ==
- List of music festivals
- List of historic rock festivals
- Woodstock '99
