= Sympathy for the Devil =

1968 song by the Rolling Stones

- 1973 German single picture sleeve

Song by the Rolling Stones

from the album Beggars Banquet
- Released: 6 December 1968
- Recorded: 4–5, 8–10 June 1968
- Studio: Olympic, London
- Genre: Samba rock
- Length: 6:18 (album version); 4:09 (single version)
- Label: Decca
- Songwriter: Jagger–Richards
- Producer: Jimmy Miller

Audio sample
- file; help

Music video
- "Sympathy for the Devil" on YouTube

"Sympathy for the Devil" is a song by the English rock band the Rolling Stones. The song was written by Mick Jagger and credited to the Jagger–Richards partnership. It is the opening track on the band's 1968 album Beggars Banquet. The song has received critical acclaim and features on Rolling Stone magazine's "The 500 Greatest Songs of All Time" list, being ranked number 106 in the 2021 edition.

== Inspiration ==
"Sympathy for the Devil" is credited to Jagger and Richards, though the song was largely a Jagger composition. The working title of the song was "The Devil Is My Name", having earlier been called "Fallen Angels". Jagger sings in first person narrative as the Devil, who boasts of his role in each of several historical atrocities and repeatedly asks the listener to "guess my name". The singer demands the listener's courtesy towards him, implicitly chastising the listeners for their collective culpability in the listed killings and crimes. In the 2012 documentary Crossfire Hurricane, Jagger stated that his influence for the song came from Baudelaire and from the Russian author Mikhail Bulgakov's novel The Master and Margarita (which had just appeared in English translation in 1967). The book was given to Jagger by Marianne Faithfull and she confirmed the inspiration in an interview with Sylvie Simmons for the magazine Mojo in 2005. The connection to Bulgakov's novel had appeared in print much earlier: in Uptight with the Stones, his 1973 account of the band's 1972 American tour, the novelist Richard Elman wrote that the song was "really just a borrowing from" The Master and Margarita.

Mick Jagger visited Salvador, Bahia, in 1968, where he encountered the traditions of Candomblé and found inspiration, along with Rio de Janeiro, for the song "Sympathy for the Devil". He also visited the hippie village of Arembepe in Bahia, where he was photographed playing a drum. His experiences in Bahia, with its folklore and local culture, were fundamental to the creation of the song, which he described as having a samba-like rhythm and rhythmic structure.

In a 1995 interview with Rolling Stone, Jagger said, "that was taken from an old idea of Baudelaire's, I think, but I could be wrong. Sometimes when I look at my Baudelaire books, I can't see it in there. But it was an idea I got from French writing. And I just took a couple of lines and expanded on it. I wrote it as sort of like a Bob Dylan song." It was Keith Richards who suggested changing the tempo and using additional percussion, turning the folk song into a samba.

Jagger stated in the Rolling Stone interview: "it's a very long historical figure – the figures of evil and figures of good – so it is a tremendously long trail he's made as personified in this piece." By the time Beggars Banquet was released, the Rolling Stones had already caused controversy for sexually forward lyrics such as "Let's Spend the Night Together" and their cover of the Willie Dixon's blues "I Just Want to Make Love to You". There were also claims they had dabbled in Satanism (their previous album, while containing no direct Satanic references in its music or lyrics, was titled Their Satanic Majesties Request). "Sympathy" brought these concerns to the fore, provoking media rumours and fears among some religious groups that the Stones were devil worshippers and a corrupting influence on youth.

The lyrics focus on atrocities in human history from Satan's point of view, including the trial and death of Jesus Christ, The Hundred Years' War, (though the line in question may also refer to European wars of religion) the violence of the Russian Revolution of 1917 and the 1918 execution of the Romanov family during World War I, and World War II. The song was originally written with a line asking who shot John F. Kennedy, but after Robert F. Kennedy's assassination on 5 June 1968, the line was changed to reference both assassinations.

The song may have been spared further controversy when the first single from the same album, "Street Fighting Man", became even more controversial in view of the race riots and student protests occurring in many cities in Europe and in the United States.

== Recording ==
The recording of "Sympathy for the Devil" began at London's Olympic Sound Studios on 4 June 1968; overdubs were done on 8, 9 and 10 June. Personnel included on the recording include Nicky Hopkins on piano, Rocky Dijon on congas and Bill Wyman on shekere. Marianne Faithfull, Anita Pallenberg, Brian Jones, Charlie Watts, photographer Michael Cooper, Wyman, and Richards performed backup vocals. Richards plays bass on the original recording, and also electric guitar. Brian Jones plays a mostly mixed-out acoustic guitar, although in isolated tracks of the studio cut, it is audible playing along with the piano.

In the 2003 book According to the Rolling Stones, Watts commented:

"Sympathy" was one of those sort of songs where we tried everything. The first time I ever heard the song was when Mick was playing it ... and it was fantastic. We had a go at loads of different ways of playing it; in the end I just played a jazz Latin feel in the style that Kenny Clarke would have played on "A Night in Tunisia".

On the overall power of the song, Jagger continued in Rolling Stone:

It has a very hypnotic groove, a samba, which has a tremendous hypnotic power, rather like good dance music. It doesn't speed up or slow down. It keeps this constant groove. Plus, the actual samba rhythm is a great one to sing on, but it's also got some other suggestions in it, an undercurrent of being primitive – because it is a primitive African, South American, Afro-whatever-you-call-that rhythm (candombe).

The backing vocals came about by accident by producer Jimmy Miller and Anita Pallenberg. Pallenberg was in the engineering booth with Miller while Jagger was belting out an early vocal take of the song. According to Pallenberg, Miller was half talking to himself as Jagger sang, saying "Who, who?" He then repeated the words several times as Jagger sang on, and Pallenberg realised how wonderful that all sounded. After the take, she told Jagger what transpired in the booth and suggested that "who who" be used in the song as a backing vocal chant. The Stones then gave it a go and after the first take, "Who who" became "woo-woo", with most of this caught on film by director Jean-Luc Godard for his One Plus One (a.k.a. Sympathy for the Devil) movie.

== Legacy ==
Of the change in public perception the band experienced after the song's release, Richards said in a 1971 interview with Rolling Stone, "Before, we were just innocent kids out for a good time, they're saying, 'They're evil, they're evil.' Oh, I'm evil, really? So that makes you start thinking about evil ... What is evil? Half of it, I don't know how many people think of Mick as the devil or as just a good rock performer or what? There are black magicians who think we are acting as unknown agents of Lucifer and others who think we are Lucifer. Everybody's Lucifer."

Hunter S. Thompson and his attorney Oscar Zeta Acosta kept replaying the song hundreds of times during their drug-induced road trip to Las Vegas in 1971 to maintain focus whilst high. In Thompson's novel, Fear and Loathing in Las Vegas and the film of the same name, the song is referenced several times.

Contrary to a widespread misconception, it was "Under My Thumb" and not "Sympathy for the Devil" that the Stones were performing when Meredith Hunter was killed at the Altamont Free Concert. Rolling Stone magazine's early articles on the incident typically misreported that the killing took place during "Sympathy for the Devil", but the Stones in fact played "Sympathy for the Devil" earlier in the concert; it was interrupted by a fight and restarted, Jagger commenting, "We're always having – something very funny happens when we start that number." Several other songs were performed before Hunter was killed.

"Sympathy for the Devil" is considered the band's "ode to madness" by The Washington Post's Paul Schwartzman. The song has been played more than 800 times by the Rolling Stones during live performances, and appears on their live albums Get Yer Ya-Ya's Out!, Love You Live, and Flashpoint, among others.

=== Lyrics ===
The song's verse "I shouted out, "Who killed the Kennedys?' / When after all, it was you and me." is considered by critic Robert Christgau to be a commentary about how "this is a world where people get killed and all of us, to one extent or another, are implicated in the fact that this is that world." This lyric was noted in 2024 by Schwartzman as being omitted from the song since approximately 2006 in live performance. Christgau believes this was possibly done due to its lack of relevance "to the younger audience".

== Personnel ==
According to authors Philippe Margotin and Jean-Michel Guesdon, except where noted:

The Rolling Stones

- Mick Jagger – lead vocals, hand drum
- Keith Richards – backing vocals, lead guitar, bass
- Brian Jones – backing vocals
- Bill Wyman – backing vocals, shekere
- Charlie Watts – backing vocals, drums

Additional personnel

- Unidentified musician – maracas (Note: Margotin and Guesdon write that, in addition to Wyman's shekere contribution, other maracas appear on the track, but are unsure who contributed them.)
- Nicky Hopkins – piano
- Rocky Dzidzornu – congas, cowbell
- Michael Cooper, Marianne Faithfull, Anita Pallenberg – backing vocals (Note: Authors Andy Babiuk and Greg Prevost write that Faithfull and Pallenberg added backing vocals with the Rolling Stones, while Margotin and Guesdon write the additional vocals were provided by Faithfull and Pallenberg, as well as Jones' new girlfriend, model Suki Potier, and the session's sound engineer, Glyn Johns. However, the footage shot during the recording session by Jean-Luc Godard for his film One Plus One clearly shows that the background vocals, in addition to the band members, are Faithfull and Pallenberg along with photographer Michael Cooper.)

== Charts ==
=== Original version ===
Weekly chart performance for "Sympathy for the Devil"
Chart (1969–2011)	Peak position
Belgium (Ultratop 50 Wallonia)	21
France (SNEP)	100
Netherlands (Dutch Top 40)	14
Netherlands (Single Top 100)	13

=== 2003 remixes ===
==== Weekly charts ====
Weekly chart performance for "Sympathy for the Devil" (2003 remixes)
Chart (2003)	Peak position
Austria (Ö3 Austria Top 40)	27
Belgium (Ultratop 50 Flanders)	42
Belgium (Ultratip Bubbling Under Wallonia)	14
Canada (Nielsen SoundScan)	10
Denmark (Tracklisten)	14
Europe (Eurochart Hot 100)	20
Germany (GfK)	18
Ireland (IRMA)	14
Italy (FIMI)	11
Netherlands (Dutch Top 40)	15
Netherlands (Single Top 100)	10
Norway (VG-lista)	15
Portugal (AFP)	3
Scottish Singles Sales (Official Charts)	11
Spain (Promusicae)	5
Sweden (Sverigetopplistan)	43
UK Singles (Official Charts)	14
UK Dance (Official Charts)	1
US Billboard Hot 100	97
US Dance Club Songs (Billboard)	34
US Dance Singles Sales (Billboard)	1

==== Year-end charts ====
2003 year-end chart performance for "Sympathy for the Devil" (2003 remixes)
Chart (2003)	Position
US Dance Singles Sales (Billboard)	9

2004 year-end chart performance for "Sympathy for the Devil" (2003 remixes)
Chart (2004)	Position
US Dance Singles Sales (Billboard)	7

== Certifications ==
Certifications and sales for "Sympathy for the Devil"
Region	Certification	Certified units/sales
Australia (ARIA)	3× Platinum	210,000^{‡}
Germany (BVMI)	Gold	250,000^{‡}
Italy (FIMI)	Platinum	50,000^{‡}
New Zealand (RMNZ)	2× Platinum	60,000^{‡}
Spain (Promusicae)	Platinum	60,000^{‡}
United Kingdom (BPI)	Platinum	600,000^{‡}
^{‡} Sales+streaming figures based on certification alone.

== Avant-garde film ==
Cover art for DVD release

Sympathy for the Devil is also the title of a 1968 film by Godard, also titled One Plus One. A depiction of the late 1960s American counterculture, the film primarily featured the Rolling Stones in the process of recording the song in the studio. On the filming, Jagger said in Rolling Stone: "[it was] very fortuitous, because Godard wanted to do a film of us in the studio. I mean, it would never happen now, to get someone as interesting as Godard. And stuffy. We just happened to be recording that song. We could have been recording 'My Obsession'. But it was 'Sympathy for the Devil', and it became the track that we used."

During the several days of recording the Stones as they played, a film lamp set up by Godard's crew started a major fire in the studio that caused substantial damage to the studio and laid waste to some of the band's equipment. However, the song's tapes were saved by Miller before he fled the studio, and Godard kept his cameras rolling capturing the fire on film as it roared on.

== Guns N' Roses version ==
"Sympathy for the Devil"

Single by Guns N' Roses

from the album Interview with the Vampire (soundtrack)
- B-side: "Escape to Paris" (by Elliot Goldenthal)
- Released: 12 December 1994
- Studio: Rumbo Recorders (Los Angeles)
- Length: 7:36
- Label: Geffen
- Songwriter: Jagger/Richards
- Producers: Guns N' Roses; Mike Clink; Matthias Gohl

Guns N' Roses singles chronology
"Since I Don't Have You" (1994)	"Sympathy for the Devil" (1994)	"Chinese Democracy" (2008)

Guns N' Roses recorded a cover in 1994 which reached number 55 on the Billboard Hot 100; it was featured in the closing credits of Neil Jordan's film adaptation of Anne Rice's Interview with the Vampire and was included on their Greatest Hits album. This cover is noteworthy for causing an incident involving incoming guitarist Paul "Huge" Tobias, that was partially responsible for guitarist Slash departing from the band in 1996. Slash has described the Guns N' Roses version of the song as "the sound of the band breaking up".

Rhythm guitarist Gilby Clarke, who does not appear on the recording, noted that the recording foreshadowed his departure from the band:

They did that while I was on the road touring for my solo record. [...] I knew that that was the ending because nobody told me about it. Officially I was in the band at that time, and they did that song without me. That was one of the last straws for me, because nobody had said anything to me, and they recorded a song by one of my favorite bands.

This was the band's final single until 2018's "Shadow of Your Love" to feature guitarist Slash and bassist Duff McKagan.

=== Personnel ===
- W. Axl Rose – lead vocals, piano
- Slash – lead and rhythm guitars
- Duff McKagan – bass, backing vocals
- Matt Sorum – drums, percussion
- Dizzy Reed – keyboards
- Paul Huge – rhythm and lead guitars, backing vocals

=== Charts ===
==== Weekly charts ====
Weekly chart performance for "Sympathy for the Devil"
Chart (1994–1995)	Peak position
Australia (ARIA)	12
Austria (Ö3 Austria Top 40)	17
Belgium (Ultratop 50 Flanders)	18
Belgium (Ultratop 50 Wallonia)	40
Canada Top Singles (RPM)	48
Canada Retail Singles (The Record)	9
Denmark (IFPI)	2
Europe (Eurochart Hot 100)	3
Europe (European Hit Radio)	7
Finland (Suomen virallinen lista)	2
France (SNEP)	15
Germany (GfK)	20
Iceland (Íslenski Listinn Topp 40)	4
Ireland (IRMA)	5
Italy (Musica e dischi)	5
Netherlands (Dutch Top 40)	10
Netherlands (Single Top 100)	9
New Zealand (Recorded Music NZ)	13
Norway (VG-lista)	5
Scottish Singles Sales (Official Charts)	8
Spain (AFYVE)	4
Sweden (Sverigetopplistan)	7
Switzerland (Schweizer Hitparade)	15
UK Singles (Official Charts)	9
US Billboard Hot 100	55
US Mainstream Rock Airplay (Billboard)	10

==== Year-end charts ====
1994 year-end chart performance for "Sympathy for the Devil"
Chart (1994)	Position
Sweden (Topplistan)	97

1995 year-end chart performance for "Sympathy for the Devil"
Chart (1995)	Position
Belgium (Ultratop 50 Wallonia)	74
Europe (Eurochart Hot 100)	63
Iceland (Íslenski Listinn Topp 40)	86
Sweden (Topplistan)	88

=== Certifications ===
Certifications for "Sympathy for the Devil"
Region	Certification	Certified units/sales
Japan (RIAJ)	Gold	50,000^{^}
^{^} Shipments figures based on certification alone.
