= Sam Cutler =

English tour manager of rock bands (1943–2023)

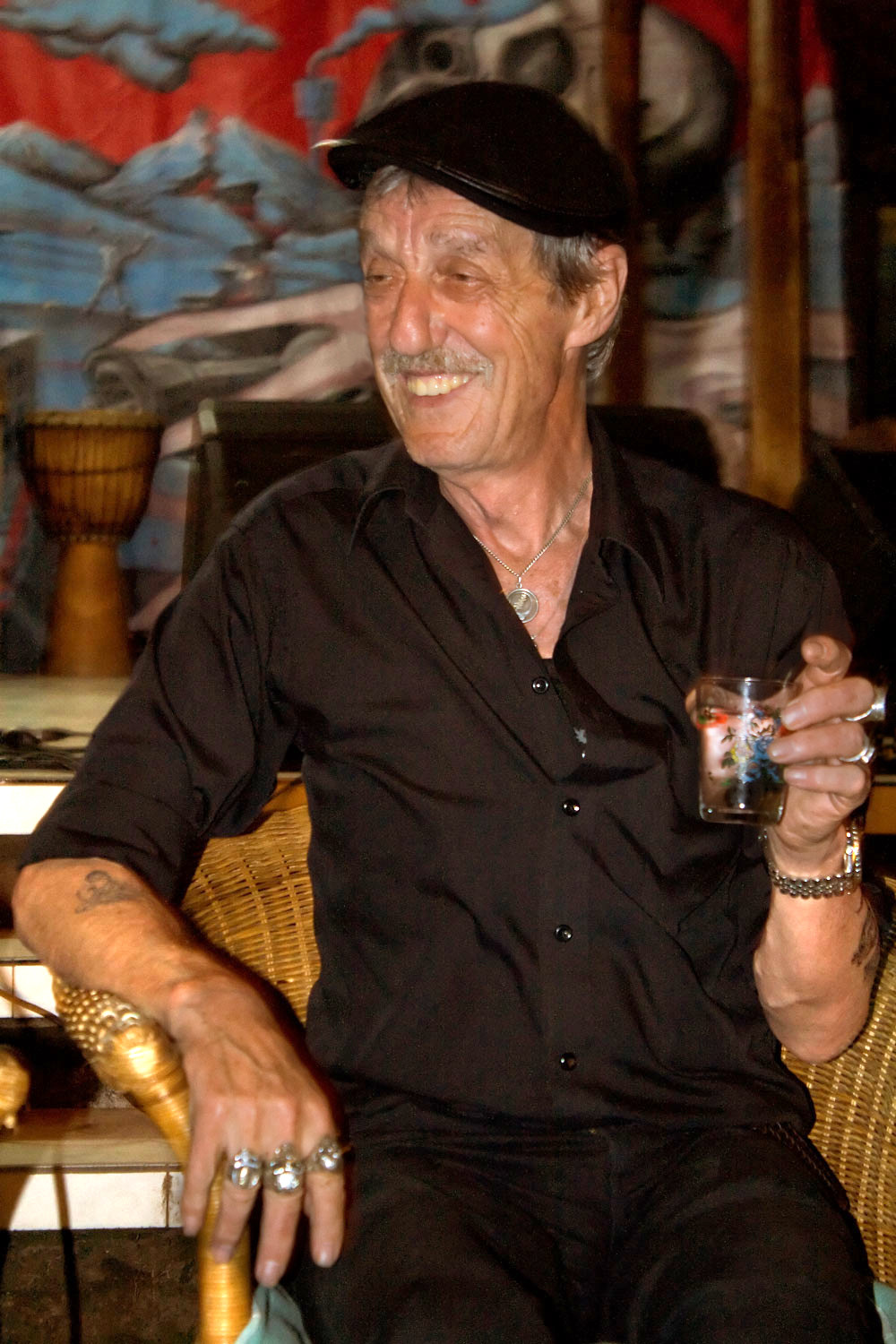

Background information
- Born: 10 March 1943
- Origin: Hatfield, Hertfordshire, England
- Died: 11 July 2023 (aged 80) Queensland, Australia
- Genres: Rock music
- Occupations: Tour manager, band manager
- Years active: 1969–1974
- Formerly of: The Rolling Stones, Grateful Dead, The Band, The Allman Brothers Band, New Riders of the Purple Sage, Sons of Champlin, Mike Bloomfield, Ramblin' Jack Elliott

Sam Cutler (born Brendan Lawrence Lyons; 10 March 1943 – 11 July 2023) was an English tour manager for The Rolling Stones, Grateful Dead, and other acts.

== Early life and career ==
Cutler was born on 10 March 1943. He was an Honours Graduate in Contemporary History (Open University (OU)) and a qualified teacher (University of Cambridge Institute of Education 1963–66). Cutler's OU degree was gained at the end of the 1980s.

Cutler worked for Blackhill Enterprises as stage manager and master of ceremonies on a series of 1960s gigs in the United Kingdom and Europe with different artists, including Pink Floyd, Eric Clapton, The Rolling Stones and Alexis Korner. In 1969, he acted as master of ceremonies at The Rolling Stones concert in Hyde Park, London.

Following the Hyde Park show, Cutler was asked to be the personal road manager to The Rolling Stones during their 1969 Tour of America, which culminated in the Altamont Free Concert where a young African-American man named Meredith Hunter was killed in front of the stage by one of the Hells Angels security team.

Cutler was credited with first uttering The Rolling Stones' famous intro line, "Ladies and Gentlemen, the Greatest Rock and Roll Band in the World...The Rolling Stones!"

== Rock and roll management career ==
Following the events at Altamont, Cutler stayed in the United States to deal with the aftermath, was befriended by Jerry Garcia, and subsequently hired by the Grateful Dead as their tour manager. He went on to become a co-manager of the band (with Jon McIntire and David Parker) and eventually became their agent and tour manager.

Cutler organised the Dead's appearances at a number of events including: the 1970 Festival Express Tour of Canada, The Summer Jam at Watkins Glen and the 1972 European Tour of the Grateful Dead, the musical results of which can be heard on the Dead's triple live album Europe '72.

Through his company, Out of Town Tours, Cutler coordinated the appearances of Grateful Dead, The Band, The Allman Brothers Band, New Riders of the Purple Sage, Sons of Champlin, Mike Bloomfield, Ramblin' Jack Elliott and others.

In 2006, Cutler collaborated with Melbourne (Australia) indie-rock group Black Cab on the track "Valiant" which appeared on the band's 2006 release Jesus East. In the track, Cutler reminisces on his days with the Grateful Dead and preaches advice for the kids of today. Cutler toured around Australia and Asia promoting his book.

== Death ==
Cutler died from cancer in Queensland, on 11 July 2023, at the age of 80.
