= Bridges to Babylon Tour '97–98 =

Video by the Rolling Stones
- Released: December 1998
- Recorded: December 12, 1997
- Venue: TWA Dome, St. Louis, Missouri
- Genre: Rock
- Length: 120:00
- Label: Warner Bros
- Producer: Michael Cohl, John Diaz

The Rolling Stones chronology
Bridges to Babylon (1997)	Bridges to Babylon Tour '97–98 (1998)	Four Flicks (2003)

Bridges to Babylon Tour '97–98 by the Rolling Stones is a concert DVD released in December 1998. It was filmed in the TWA Dome in St. Louis, Missouri, on 12 December 1997 during the Bridges to Babylon Tour 1997–1998. Featuring performances by Dave Matthews and Joshua Redman.

The concert was broadcast as a pay-per-view special. Of the 23 songs played, 4 songs were left off the DVD. "Anybody Seen My Baby?", "Corinna" with Taj Mahal, "All About You" and "The Last Time" were also played. "Waiting on a Friend", "Corinna" and "The Last Time" from this concert were released on the live album No Security.

== Track listing ==
1. Opening
2. "(I Can't Get No) Satisfaction"
3. "Let's Spend the Night Together"
4. "Flip the Switch"
5. "Gimme Shelter"
6. "Wild Horses" (featuring Dave Matthews)
7. "Saint of Me"
8. "Out of Control"
9. "Waiting on a Friend" (featuring Joshua Redman)
10. "Miss You"
11. "Wanna Hold You"
12. Across the bridge (B-stage)
13. "It's Only Rock 'n Roll (But I Like It)"
14. "Like a Rolling Stone"
15. "Sympathy for the Devil"
16. "Tumbling Dice"
17. "Honky Tonk Women"
18. "Start Me Up"
19. "Jumpin' Jack Flash"
20. "You Can't Always Get What You Want"
21. "Brown Sugar"
22. Bows and End credits

== Personnel ==
The Rolling Stones

- Mick Jagger – lead vocals, guitar, harmonica
- Keith Richards – guitars and vocals
- Charlie Watts – drums
- Ronnie Wood – electric guitar, backing vocals

Additional musicians

- Darryl Jones – bass guitar
- Chuck Leavell – keyboards, backing vocals
- Bernard Fowler – backing vocals, percussion
- Lisa Fischer – backing vocals
- Blondie Chaplin – backing vocals, percussion
- Bobby Keys – saxophone
- Kent Smith – trumpet
- Andy Snitzer – saxophone, organ
- Michael Davis – trombone

Special guests

- Dave Matthews – vocals on "Wild Horses"
- Joshua Redman – saxophone on "Waiting on a Friend"
