= Welcome to Shepherd's Bush =

Live album by the Rolling Stones
- Released: 6 December 2024
- Recorded: 8 June 1999
- Venue: Shepherd's Bush Empire
- Genre: Rock
- Length: 90:00 minute
- Label: Mercury
- Producer: The Rolling Stones

The Rolling Stones chronology
Live at the Wiltern (2024)	Welcome to Shepherd's Bush (2024)	Foreign Tongues (2026)

Welcome to Shepherd's Bush is a live album and a concert video by the rock band the Rolling Stones. It was recorded at Shepherd's Bush Empire in London on 8 June 1999. It was released on CD, LP, Blu-Ray, Ultra HD Blu-ray, and digital formats on 6 December 2024.

The album and video document one of the occasional Rolling Stones concerts played at smaller, more intimate venues. About 2,000 people attended the show. By contrast, the Stones' next concert was performed a few nights later at Wembley Stadium for about 70,000 fans.

The show was part of the band's No Security Tour. The opening act was Sheryl Crow, who performs with the Stones on the song "Honky Tonk Women".

The album cover resembles an abstract drawing, with black lines on a grey background, but is actually a street map of the Shepherd's Bush neighborhood, with the location of the concert hall indicated with an arrow.

== Critical reception ==
In Goldmine magazine, Dave Thompson wrote, "... for all their success, the Rolling Stones remain, at heart, a club act, at their best when the audience is crammed against the stage, and the venue is smaller than the average 'major tour' dressing room. Welcome to Shepherd’s Bush is a more than welcome addition to that catalog."

In Rock & Blues Muse, Hal Horowitz said, "There, in front of a star-studded audience... the Stones dug a little, sometimes a lot, deeper in their history, performing tunes that seldom, if ever, made it to stadium shows.... This tour supported 1998s No Security, their then-recent live album of songs that rarely appeared in concerts, so the smaller site worked to further that concept."

In Americana Highways, Jeff Burger wrote, "Like El Mocambo and Wiltern, the Shepherd's Bush show – which came right before two sold-out performances at the 70,000-seat Wembley Stadium – features a star-studded audience and a particularly fired-up band.... Throughout the set, the band seems to have at least as much fun as their audience. Even [Charlie] Watts, who often displays a poker face, can't resist the occasional smile."

== CD Track listing ==
All songs written by Mick Jagger and Keith Richards, except "Route 66" written by Bobby Troup.

Disc 1

1. "Shattered" – 4:19
2. "It's Only Rock 'n Roll (But I Like It)" – 5:38
3. "Respectable" – 3:19
4. "All Down the Line" – 4:09
5. "Some Girls" – 4:52
6. "Melody" – 5:34
7. "I Got the Blues" – 3:27
8. "Brand New Car" – 4:48
9. "Moon Is Up" – 4:58

Disc 2

1. "Saint of Me" – 6:04
2. "Honky Tonk Women" – 4:25
3. Band introductions – 3:58
4. "You Got the Silver" – 4:11
5. "Before They Make Me Run" – 3:33
6. "Route 66" – 3:05
7. "You Got Me Rocking" – 3:25
8. "Tumbling Dice" – 4:24
9. "Brown Sugar" – 5:51
10. "Jumpin' Jack Flash" – 5:11

== Personnel ==
The Rolling Stones

- Mick Jagger – vocals, guitar, harmonica
- Keith Richards – guitar, vocals
- Charlie Watts – drums
- Ronnie Wood – guitar

Additional musicians

- Darryl Jones – bass, backing vocals
- Chuck Leavell – keyboards, backing vocals
- Bobby Keys – saxophone
- Tim Ries – saxophone, keyboards
- Michael Davis – trombone
- Kent Smith – trumpet
- Lisa Fischer – backing vocals
- Bernard Fowler – backing vocals, percussion
- Blondie Chaplin – backing vocals, percussion, acoustic guitar
- Leah Wood – backing vocals on "Before They Make Me Run"

Guest artist

- Sheryl Crow on "Honky Tonk Women"

Production

- Executive producer: Michael Cohl
- Executive producers in charge of production: Stephen Howard, Jake Berry
- Recording: Eurosound Mobiles
- Engineer: Chris Kimsey
- Mixing: Declan Gaffney
- Audio assistant: Charlie Rolfe
- Mastering: Mazen Murad
- LP lacquer cutting: Naweed
- Design: John Moss
- Photography: Dave Hogan, Kevin Mazur
