= No Security Tour =

1999 concert tour by the Rolling Stones

No Security Tour '99
- Tour by The Rolling Stones
- Location: Europe; North America
- Associated album: No Security
- Start date: 25 January 1999
- End date: 20 June 1999
- Legs: 2
- No. of shows: 43
- Box office: US$88.5 million ($167.05 million in 2024 dollars)

The Rolling Stones concert chronology
- Bridges to Babylon Tour (1997–98); No Security Tour (1999); Licks Tour (2002–03)

The No Security Tour was a Rolling Stones concert tour to promote the concert album No Security. The tour spanned over 40 shows in North America and Europe in 1999 and grossed $88.5 million from over a million tickets sold.

== History ==
They decided to do a tour with crowds less than 20,000 after the worldwide enormous Bridges to Babylon Tour with crowds of up to 100,000. The band insisted on smaller venues, with fewer special effects, concentrating on the music and band. The tour supported their new album No Security – a live album of Bridges to Babylon Tour recordings. After rehearsing for twelve days in San Francisco, the No Security Tour began on 25 January 1999 at the Oakland Arena in Oakland, California.

The 1999 European concerts are mistakenly considered as a European leg of the No Security Tour, but it is indeed a new leg to the Bridges to Baylon Tour, mainly consisting of cancelled shows from the 1998 Bridges to Babylon Tour. The stage used in Europe was the classical Bridges to Babylon Tour stage from 1997 and 1998.

In July 2018, the band released "From the Vault: No Security Tour - San Jose '99" on CD/vinyl/DVD/Blu-Ray format. This was followed six years later in December 2024 by "Welcome to Shepherds Bush" on CD/vinyl/DVD/Blu-Ray format chronicling an intimate show in London recorded in June 1999.

== Set list ==
This set list is representative of the performance in Washington, D.C., on 7 March 1999. It does not represent all concerts for the duration of the tour.

1. "Jumpin' Jack Flash"
2. "Live with Me"
3. "Respectable"
4. "You Got Me Rocking"
5. "Honky Tonk Women"
6. "Saint of Me"
7. "Some Girls"
8. "Paint It Black"
9. "You Got the Silver"
10. "Before They Make Me Run"
11. "Out of Control"
12. "Route 66"
13. "When the Whip Comes Down"
14. "Tumbling Dice"
15. "It's Only Rock 'n Roll (But I Like It)"
16. "Start Me Up"
17. "Brown Sugar"
18. "Sympathy for the Devil"

== Shows ==
List of 1999 concerts, showing date, city, country, venue, opening act, tickets sold, number of available tickets and amount of gross revenue
Date	City	Country	Venue	Opening act(s)	Attendance	Revenue
25 January 1999	Oakland	United States	The Arena in Oakland	Bryan Adams	17,864 / 17,864	$2,042,421
27 January 1999	Sacramento	United States	ARCO Arena	Bryan Adams	27,820 / 27,820	$2,892,416
2 February 1999	Denver	United States	McNichols Sports Arena	Bryan Adams	16,722 / 16,722	$1,782,803
4 February 1999	Salt Lake City	United States	Delta Center	Bryan Adams	16,579 / 16,579	$1,753,807
6 February 1999	Sacramento	United States	ARCO Arena	Bryan Adams	(Note: The score data is representative of the two shows in Sacramento, California at the ARCO Arena on 27 January and 6 February respectively.)	
9 February 1999	Anaheim	United States	Arrowhead Pond of Anaheim	Bryan Adams	32,827 / 32,827	$4,095,681
11 February 1999	Anaheim	United States	Arrowhead Pond of Anaheim	Bryan Adams	32,827 / 32,827	$4,095,681
15 February 1999	Minneapolis	United States	Target Center	Jonny Lang	15,352 / 15,352	$1,622,103
17 February 1999	Fargo	United States	Fargodome	Jonny Lang	21,970 / 21,970	$1,510,183
19 February 1999	Milwaukee	United States	Bradley Center	Wide Mouth Mason	17,222 / 17,222	$1,749,164
22 February 1999	Auburn Hills	United States	The Palace of Auburn Hills	Wide Mouth Mason	19,570 / 19,570	$2,283,946
25 February 1999	Toronto	Canada	Air Canada Centre	Big Sugar	17,236 / 17,236	$1,723,445
3 March 1999	Tampa	United States	Ice Palace	The Flys	19,470 / 19,470	$1,799,677
5 March 1999	Sunrise	United States	National Car Rental Center	The Flys	19,085 / 19,085	$2,233,231
7 March 1999	Washington, D.C.	United States	MCI Center	The Corrs	35,713 / 35,713	$3,980,893
8 March 1999	Washington, D.C.	United States	MCI Center	The Corrs	35,713 / 35,713	$3,980,893
11 March 1999	Pittsburgh	United States	Civic Arena	The Corrs	16,717 / 16,717	$1,780,667
15 March 1999	Philadelphia	United States	First Union Center	The Corrs	37,429 / 37,429	$4,293,584
17 March 1999	Philadelphia	United States	First Union Center	The Corrs	37,429 / 37,429	$4,293,584
20 March 1999	Charlotte	United States	Charlotte Coliseum	Goo Goo Dolls	19,540 / 19,540	$2,000,081
22 March 1999	Boston	United States	FleetCenter	Goo Goo Dolls	35,049 / 35,049	$4,403,159
23 March 1999	Boston	United States	FleetCenter	Goo Goo Dolls	35,049 / 35,049	$4,403,159
26 March 1999	Chicago	United States	United Center	Goo Goo Dolls	19,030 / 19,030	$2,267,011
28 March 1999	Hartford	United States	Hartford Civic Center	Goo Goo Dolls	31,200 / 31,200	$3,203,815
29 March 1999	Hartford	United States	Hartford Civic Center	Goo Goo Dolls	31,200 / 31,200	$3,203,815
1 April 1999	Cleveland	United States	Gund Arena	Jonny Lang	20,086 / 20,086	$2,003,327
3 April 1999	Columbus	United States	Value City Arena	Jonny Lang	17,875 / 17,875	$1,772,318
6 April 1999	Kansas City	United States	Kemper Arena	Jonny Lang	17,446 / 17,446	$1,719,610
8 April 1999	Memphis	United States	Pyramid Arena	Jonny Lang	19,631 / 19,631	$1,530,439
10 April 1999	Oklahoma City	United States	Myriad Convention Center	Jonny Lang	14,091 / 14,091	$1,239,191
12 April 1999	Chicago	United States	United Center	Jonny Lang	18,941 / 18,941	$2,277,878
16 April 1999	Paradise	United States	MGM Grand Garden Arena	Sugar Ray	12,566 / 12,566	$2,780,450
19 April 1999	San Jose	United States	San Jose Arena	Sugar Ray	32,943 / 32,943	$3,901,791
20 April 1999	San Jose	United States	San Jose Arena	Sugar Ray	32,943 / 32,943	$3,901,791
29 May 1999	Stuttgart	Germany	Cannstatter Wasen	Ocean Colour Scene	65,197 / 65,197	$3,241,257
31 May 1999	Imst	Austria	Festivalgelaende Brennbichl	Bryan Adams; Zucchero	47,447 / 47,447	$2,337,341
2 June 1999	Groningen	Netherlands	Stadspark	Catatonia	75,000 / 75,000	$3,326,270
4 June 1999	Edinburgh	Scotland	Murrayfield Stadium	Sheryl Crow	44,283 / 44,283	$2,108,748
6 June 1999	Sheffield	England	Don Valley Stadium	Sheryl Crow	32,425 / 35,000	$1,499,331
8 June 1999	London	England	Shepherd's Bush Empire	Sheryl Crow	2000 / 2000	unknown
11 June 1999	London	England	Wembley Stadium	Sheryl Crow	139,962 / 139,962	$7,174,154
12 June 1999	London	England	Wembley Stadium	Sheryl Crow	139,962 / 139,962	$7,174,154
15 June 1999	Santiago de Compostela	Spain	Monte do Gozo	Los Suaves	29,000	—N/a
18 June 1999	Landgraaf	Netherlands	Megaland Landgraf	Rowwen Heze	44,152 / 45,000	$2,001,886
20 June 1999	Cologne	Germany	Müngersdorfer Stadion	BAP	39,746 / 45,000	$2,162,759
Total					1,078,186 / 1,086,863	$88,494,837

== Personnel ==
=== The Rolling Stones ===
- Mick Jagger – lead vocals, guitar, harmonica, keyboards
- Keith Richards – guitars, vocals
- Ronnie Wood – guitars
- Charlie Watts – drums

=== Additional musicians ===
- Darryl Jones – bass, backing vocals
- Chuck Leavell – keyboards, backing vocals
- Bobby Keys – saxophone
- Tim Ries – saxophone, keyboards
- Michael Davis – trombone
- Kent Smith – trumpet
- Lisa Fischer – backing vocals
- Bernard Fowler – backing vocals, percussion
- Blondie Chaplin – backing vocals, percussion, acoustic guitar

== See also ==
- List of highest-grossing concert tours
