= Bridges to Babylon Tour =

1997–98 concert tour by the Rolling Stones

- Tour by The Rolling Stones
- Location: Asia; Europe; North America; South America
- Associated album: Bridges to Babylon
- Start date: 23 September 1997
- End date: 19 September 1998
- Legs: 5
- No. of shows: 102
- Box office: $274 million ($541.23 in 2025 dollars)

The Rolling Stones concert chronology
- Voodoo Lounge Tour (1994–95); Bridges to Babylon Tour (1997–98); No Security Tour (1999)

The Bridges to Babylon Tour was a worldwide concert tour by the Rolling Stones. Staged in support of their album Bridges to Babylon, the tour visited stadiums from 1997 to 1998. It grossed over $274 million, becoming the second-highest-grossing tour at that time, behind their own Voodoo Lounge Tour of 1994–1995. The Bridges to Babylon Tour was followed by 1999's No Security Tour.

== History ==
The tour was announced in a press conference held beneath the Brooklyn Bridge in New York City.

The tour began on 9 September 1997 in Toronto, Ontario, Canada, and comprised fifty-six shows in North America, nine shows in South America, six shows in Japan and thirty-seven shows in Europe. It concluded on 19 September 1998 in Istanbul, Turkey. Five shows were cancelled (in Marseille, Paris, Lyon, Bilbao and Gijón) and five were postponed (in Italy, Ireland and Great Britain).

The production was designed by Mark Fisher, Charlie Watts, Mick Jagger and Patrick Woodroffe. The show opened with a circular central screen exploding with fireworks, from which guitarist Keith Richards emerged playing the classic riff to "(I Can't Get No) Satisfaction". The stage design included a 46 m (150 ft) long telescoping cantilever bridge that extended from the main stage to a 'B' stage in the center of the field.

One of the innovations was a "web vote" – fans who purchased a ticket could vote for a song they wanted to hear. If a song was picked by the web vote 4 shows in a row it became a permanent part of the set list ("Gimme Shelter" was added early on in the tour and "Under My Thumb" came one shy of 4 on 6 occasions, but never was requested for 4 consecutive shows). A few shows had no web vote (for example, in Brazil, where the band performed with Bob Dylan on "Like a Rolling Stone").

This was the band's first tour where a B-stage was featured at most shows (they had used one on the Voodoo Lounge Tour, but only at one show). The band normally played three numbers on the B-stage, with the exception of the final show where only two were played there.

The Bridges to Babylon Tour was the second-highest-grossing tour at the time, behind their own record-breaking 1994–1995 Voodoo Lounge Tour. It was believed 4.577 million people attended the tour over the 102 shows – 2.02 million in Europe, 2.009 million in North America, 348,000 in Argentina and Brazil, and 200,000 in Japan. The tour reached 25 countries and is the second–largest North American tour of all time – second to the Rolling Stones' 2005–2007 A Bigger Bang Tour.

The tour is documented by the live album No Security and a DVD release of the St. Louis, Missouri show. In 1999 the band commenced another tour called the No Security Tour, which played smaller venues and fewer destinations.

Among the opening acts was, in October 1997, Sheryl Crow. "They invited me to go on their private plane…" she recalled. "Three weeks before I went on the tour, my band and I watched the Stones film Cocksucker Blues. It's a riot – it's complete debauchery and there are several scenes where they're practically having orgies on their private 747 back in the early '70s. So I got on their plane and I thought, 'Wow, what a difference! We definitely have changed our tune here, haven't we?'"

"Bridges to Bremen", a double CD / Blu-ray / DVD live album, was released in June 2019.

"Bridges to Buenos Aires", a double CD / Blu-ray / DVD live album, was released on 8 November 2019.

== Set list ==
1. "(I Can't Get No) Satisfaction"
2. "Let's Spend the Night Together"
3. "Flip the Switch"
4. "Gimme Shelter"
5. "Anybody Seen My Baby?"
6. "Saint of Me"
7. "Out of Control"
8. "Miss You"
9. "All About You"
10. "Wanna Hold You"
11. "Sympathy for the Devil"
12. "Tumbling Dice"
13. "Honky Tonk Women"
14. "Start Me Up"
15. "Jumpin' Jack Flash"
16. "You Can't Always Get What You Want"
17. "Brown Sugar"
18. "Waiting on a Friend"

== Shows ==
List of concerts, showing date, city, country, venue, opening act, tickets sold, number of available tickets and amount of gross revenue
Date	City	Country	Venue	Opening act(s)	Attendance	Revenue
North America
23 September 1997	Chicago	United States	Soldier Field	Blues Traveler	107,186 / 107,186	$6,260,000
25 September 1997	Chicago	United States	Soldier Field	Blues Traveler	107,186 / 107,186	$6,260,000
27 September 1997	Columbus	United States	Ohio Stadium	Blues Traveler	60,621 / 60,621	$3,553,069
30 September 1997	Winnipeg	Canada	Winnipeg Stadium	Blues Traveler	34,685 / 40,000	$1,575,160
2 October 1997	Edmonton	Canada	Commonwealth Stadium	Blues Traveler	44,036 / 44,036	$2,033,971
6 October 1997	Madison	United States	Camp Randall Stadium	Blues Traveler	27,087 / 35,000	$1,460,425
8 October 1997	Orchard Park	United States	Rich Stadium	Blues Traveler	30,404 / 35,000	$1,655,588
10 October 1997	Charlotte	United States	Ericsson Stadium	Blues Traveler	54,436 / 54,436	$3,126,945
12 October 1997	Philadelphia	United States	Veterans Stadium	Blues Traveler	56,651 / 56,651	$3,275,572
16 October 1997	East Rutherford	United States	Giants Stadium	Foo Fighters	118,610 / 118,610	$6,823,242
17 October 1997	East Rutherford	United States	Giants Stadium	Foo Fighters	118,610 / 118,610	$6,823,242
20 October 1997	Foxborough	United States	Foxboro Stadium	Sheryl Crow	84,696 / 84,696	$4,839,760
21 October 1997	Foxborough	United States	Foxboro Stadium	Sheryl Crow	84,696 / 84,696	$4,839,760
23 October 1997	Landover	United States	Jack Kent Cooke Stadium	Sheryl Crow	55,654 / 55,654	$3,195,710
26 October 1997	Nashville	United States	Vanderbilt Stadium	Sheryl Crow	45,193 / 45,193	$2,551,578
28 October 1997	Norman	United States	Owen Field	Sheryl Crow	53,327 / 53,327	$3,076,378
30 October 1997	Albuquerque	United States	University Stadium	Sheryl Crow	34,362 / 34,362	$2,075,326
1 November 1997	Fort Worth	United States	Texas Motor Speedway	Smashing Pumpkins; Dave Matthews Band; Matchbox 20	43,496 / 50,000	$3,030,330
7 November 1997	Tempe	United States	Sun Devil Stadium	Third Eye Blind	47,056 / 47,056	$2,699,842
9 November 1997	Los Angeles	United States	Dodger Stadium	The Wallflowers	90,519 / 90,519	$5,338,429
10 November 1997	Los Angeles	United States	Dodger Stadium	The Wallflowers	90,519 / 90,519	$5,338,429
14 November 1997	Oakland	United States	Oakland Alameda County Coliseum	Pearl Jam	186,220 / 186,220	$10,955,527
15 November 1997	Oakland	United States	Oakland Alameda County Coliseum	Pearl Jam	186,220 / 186,220	$10,955,527
18 November 1997	Oakland	United States	Oakland Alameda County Coliseum	Pearl Jam	186,220 / 186,220	$10,955,527
19 November 1997	Oakland	United States	Oakland Alameda County Coliseum	Pearl Jam	186,220 / 186,220	$10,955,527
22 November 1997	Las Vegas	United States	MGM Grand Garden Arena	Jamiroquai	12,750 / 12,750	$2,925,800
25 November 1997	Minneapolis	United States	Hubert H. Humphrey Metrodome	Third Eye Blind	46,265 / 46,265	$2,674,383
28 November 1997	Seattle	United States	Kingdome	Third Eye Blind	42,258 / 42,258	$2,411,261
2 December 1997	Pontiac	United States	Pontiac Silverdome	Third Eye Blind	51,466 / 51,466	$2,801,714
5 December 1997	Miami	United States	Orange Bowl	Smashing Pumpkins; Dave Matthews Band; Third Eye Blind	53,547 / 55,000	$3,680,635
7 December 1997	Orlando	United States	Citrus Bowl	Santana	32,723 / 35,000	$1,817,499
9 December 1997	Atlanta	United States	Georgia Dome	Third Eye Blind	52,232 / 52,232	$3,008,665
12 December 1997	St. Louis	United States	TWA Dome	Kenny Wayne Shepherd; Dave Matthews; Taj Mahal; Joshua Redman	46,474 / 46,474	$2,538,881
5 January 1998	Quebec City	Canada	Colisée de Quebec	Our Lady Peace	11,993 / 11,993	$415,705
14 January 1998	New York City	United States	Madison Square Garden	Fiona Apple	53,626 / 53,626	$6,395,815
16 January 1998	New York City	United States	Madison Square Garden	Fiona Apple	53,626 / 53,626	$6,395,815
17 January 1998	New York City	United States	Madison Square Garden	Fiona Apple	53,626 / 53,626	$6,395,815
23 January 1998	Honolulu	United States	Aloha Stadium	Jonny Lang	54,006 / 60,000	$3,317,190
24 January 1998	Honolulu	United States	Aloha Stadium	Jonny Lang	54,006 / 60,000	$3,317,190
28 January 1998	Vancouver	Canada	BC Place Stadium	Jonny Lang	37,058 / 40,000	$1,472,119
30 January 1998	Portland	United States	Rose Garden	Jonny Lang	35,059 / 35,059	$2,975,914
31 January 1998	Portland	United States	Rose Garden		35,059 / 35,059	$2,975,914
3 February 1998	San Diego	United States	Qualcomm Stadium	Santana	55,507 / 55,507	$3,220,069
7 February 1998	Mexico City	Mexico	Foro Sol	El Tri	88,700 / 88,700	$3,902,244
9 February 1998	Mexico City	Mexico	Foro Sol	El Tri	88,700 / 88,700	$3,902,244
12 February 1998	Houston	United States	Compaq Center	Jonny Lang	23,612 / 23,612	$2,244,058
13 February 1998	Houston	United States	Compaq Center	Jonny Lang	23,612 / 23,612	$2,244,058
Asia
12 March 1998	Tokyo	Japan	Tokyo Dome	—N/a	130,020 / 130,020	$10,025,470
14 March 1998	Tokyo	Japan	Tokyo Dome	—N/a	130,020 / 130,020	$10,025,470
16 March 1998	Tokyo	Japan	Tokyo Dome	—N/a	130,020 / 130,020	$10,025,470
17 March 1998	Tokyo	Japan	Tokyo Dome	—N/a	130,020 / 130,020	$10,025,470
20 March 1998	Osaka	Japan	Osaka Dome	—N/a	69,427 / 69,427	$5,317,800
21 March 1998	Osaka	Japan	Osaka Dome	—N/a	69,427 / 69,427	$5,317,800
South America
29 March 1998	Buenos Aires	Argentina	River Plate Stadium	Viejas Locas; Meredith Brooks	271,766 / 271,766	$14,819,850
30 March 1998	Buenos Aires	Argentina	River Plate Stadium	Las Pelotas; Meredith Brooks	271,766 / 271,766	$14,819,850
2 April 1998	Buenos Aires	Argentina	River Plate Stadium	—N/a	271,766 / 271,766	$14,819,850
4 April 1998	Buenos Aires	Argentina	River Plate Stadium	Las Pelotas; Bob Dylan	271,766 / 271,766	$14,819,850
5 April 1998	Buenos Aires	Argentina	River Plate Stadium	Las Pelotas; Bob Dylan	271,766 / 271,766	$14,819,850
11 April 1998	Rio de Janeiro	Brazil	Praça da Apoteose	Bob Dylan	27,984 / 27,984	$1,253,277
13 April 1998	São Paulo	Brazil	Estádio Ícaro de Castro Mello	Bob Dylan	48,606 / 48,606	$2,591,148
North America
17 April 1998	Syracuse	United States	Carrier Dome	Our Lady Peace	26,047 / 28,000	$1,231,694
19 April 1998	Montreal	Canada	Molson Centre	—N/a	32,097 / 32,097	$1,339,778
20 April 1998	Montreal	Canada	Molson Centre	—N/a	32,097 / 32,097	$1,339,778
23 April 1998	Chicago	United States	United Center	Buddy Guy	18,672 / 18,672	$2,234,920
26 April 1998	Toronto	Canada	SkyDome	Wide Mouth Mason	54,986 / 54,986	$2,222,969
Europe
13 June 1998	Nuremberg	Germany	Zeppelinfeld	Jonny Lang	91,590 / 91,590	$4,366,698
20 June 1998	Werchter	Belgium	Werchter festival ground	Simple Minds	95,104 / 95,104	$4,095,315
21 June 1998	Werchter	Belgium	Werchter festival ground	Simple Minds	95,104 / 95,104	$4,095,315
24 June 1998	Düsseldorf	Germany	Rheinstadion	Dave Matthews Band	59,022 / 59,022	$3,958,940
26 June 1998	Hanover	Germany	Expo Gelaende	Dave Matthews Band	89,963 / 89,963	$4,253,451
29 June 1998	Amsterdam	Netherlands	Amsterdam ArenA	Dave Matthews Band	261,277 / 261,277	$11,094,308
1 July 1998	Amsterdam	Netherlands	Amsterdam ArenA	Dave Matthews Band	261,277 / 261,277	$11,094,308
2 July 1998	Amsterdam	Netherlands	Amsterdam ArenA	Dave Matthews Band	261,277 / 261,277	$11,094,308
5 July 1998	Amsterdam	Netherlands	Amsterdam ArenA	Dave Matthews Band	261,277 / 261,277	$11,094,308
6 July 1998	Amsterdam	Netherlands	Amsterdam ArenA	Dave Matthews Band	261,277 / 261,277	$11,094,308
9 July 1998	Frauenfeld	Switzerland	Pferderennbahn	Dave Matthews Band	59,768 / 59,768	$2,641,315
11 July 1998	Wiener Neustadt	Austria	Flugfeld	—N/a	57,216 / 57,216	$2,497,966
13 July 1998	Munich	Germany	Olympiastadion	Hothouse Flowers	74,588 / 74,588	$4,303,476
16 July 1998	Málaga	Spain	Puerto de Málaga	Hothouse Flowers	34,450 / 40,000	$1,477,476
18 July 1998	Vigo	Spain	Estadio Balaídos	Seahorses	33,116 / 35,000	$1,527,642
20 July 1998	Barcelona	Spain	Estadi Olímpic Lluís Companys	Hothouse Flowers	52,375 / 52,375	$2,464,319
25 July 1998	Saint-Denis	France	Stade de France	Jean-Louis Aubert	76,716 / 76,716	$4,406,313
27 July 1998	Gelsenkirchen	Germany	Parkstadion	Hothouse Flowers	34,610 / 40,000	$2,139,815
29 July 1998	Copenhagen	Denmark	Idraetsparken	Seahorses	47,726 / 47,726	$2,832,622
31 July 1998	Gothenburg	Sweden	Nya Ullevi	Seahorses	56,683 / 56,683	$2,630,783
2 August 1998	Oslo	Norway	Valle Hovin	Seahorses	30,447 / 35,000	$1,522,378
5 August 1998	Helsinki	Finland	Olympic Stadium	Seahorses	45,236 / 45,236	$2,282,011
8 August 1998	Tallinn	Estonia	Song Festival Grounds	Big Country	28,152 / 40,000	$1,134,161
11 August 1998	Moscow	Russia	Luzhniki Stadium	Splean	45,304 / 45,304	$1,513,838
14 August 1998	Chorzów	Poland	Stadion Śląski	Dżem	44,598 / 44,598	$1,440,020
20 August 1998	Zagreb	Croatia	Zagreb Hippodrome	Big Country	76,755 / 76,755	$2,313,386
22 August 1998	Prague	Czech Republic	Sportovní Hala	The Corrs	16,000 / 16,000	—N/a
26 August 1998	Berlin	Germany	Olympiastadion	Big Country	70,900 / 70,900	$4,194,917
28 August 1998	Leipzig	Germany	Festwiese	Big Country	74,348 / 74,348	$3,510,436
30 August 1998	Hamburg	Germany	Trabrennbahn Bahrenfeld	Big Country	90,000 / 90,000	$4,235,411
2 September 1998	Bremen	Germany	Weserstadion	Big Country	32,288 / 40,000	$2,149,934
5 September 1998	The Hague	Netherlands	Malieveld	Big Country	86,000 / 86,000	$3,699,393
8 September 1998	Stockholm	Sweden	Stockholm Globe Arena	Soundtrack of our Lives	15,580 / 15,580	$932,377
10 September 1998	Berlin	Germany	Waldbühne	The Corrs	16,403 / 16,403	$1,560,032
12 September 1998	Mannheim	Germany	Maimarktgelände	The Corrs	85,913 / 85,913	$4,448,942
16 September 1998	Athens	Greece	Olympic Stadium	Xylina Spathia	79,446 / 79,446	$3,859,407
19 September 1998	Istanbul	Turkey	Ali Sami Yen Stadium	—N/a	14,873 / 20,000	$642,999
Total					4,437,567 / 4,518,578	$248,495,791

== Personnel ==
=== The Rolling Stones ===
- Mick Jagger – lead vocals, guitar, harmonica, percussion, keyboards
- Keith Richards – rhythm guitar, vocals
- Ronnie Wood – lead guitar, keyboards
- Charlie Watts – drums

=== Additional musicians ===
- Darryl Jones – bass, backing vocals
- Chuck Leavell – keyboards, backing vocals
- Bobby Keys – saxophone
- Andy Snitzer – saxophone, keyboards
- Michael Davis – trombone
- Kent Smith – trumpet
- Lisa Fischer – backing vocals
- Bernard Fowler – backing vocals, percussion
- Blondie Chaplin – backing vocals, percussion, guitar, keyboards
- Pierre de Beauport – keyboards on "Thief in the Night"

=== Crew ===
- Pierre de Beauport - guitar technician
- Chris Wade-Evans - monitor engineer

== See also ==
- List of highest-grossing concert tours
- List of most-attended concert tours
