= Live at the Wiltern (Rolling Stones album) =

Live album by the Rolling Stones
- Released: 8 March 2024
- Recorded: 4 November 2002
- Venue: Wiltern Theatre (Los Angeles)
- Genre: Rock
- Length: 106:00
- Label: Mercury
- Producer: The Rolling Stones

The Rolling Stones chronology
Hackney Diamonds (2023)	Live at the Wiltern (2024)	Welcome to Shepherd's Bush (2024)

Live at the Wiltern is a live album and a concert video by the English rock band the Rolling Stones. It was recorded on 4 November 2002 at the Wiltern Theatre in Los Angeles. It was released on CD, LP, DVD, and Blu-ray on 8 March 2024.

The Wiltern show was part of the Stones' Licks Tour, in support of their 40th anniversary compilation album Forty Licks. The opening act for the concert was soul singer Solomon Burke.

Live at the Wiltern debuted at number 16 on the Billboard Top Album Sales chart.

== Track listing ==
All songs written by Mick Jagger and Keith Richards except where noted.

CD 1

1. "Jumpin' Jack Flash" – 3:58
2. "Live with Me" – 4:30
3. "Neighbours" – 4:40
4. "Hand of Fate" – 3:56
5. "No Expectations" – 4:41
6. "Beast of Burden" – 5:16
7. "Stray Cat Blues" – 5:11
8. "Dance, Part 1" (Mick Jagger, Keith Richards, Ronnie Wood) – 6:31
9. "Everybody Needs Somebody to Love" (Solomon Burke, Bert Berns, Jerry Wexler) – 5:49
10. "That's How Strong My Love Is" (Roosevelt Jamison) – 3:47
11. "Going to a Go-Go" (Smokey Robinson, Pete Moore, Bobby Rogers, Marv Tarplin) – 3:54
12. Band introductions – 3:22

CD 2

1. "Thru and Thru" – 7:09
2. "You Don't Have to Mean It" – 4:43
3. "Can't You Hear Me Knocking" – 10:20
4. "Rock Me Baby" (B. B. King) – 4:31
5. "Bitch" – 4:02
6. "Honky Tonk Women" – 4:38
7. "Start Me Up" – 4:17
8. "Brown Sugar" – 5:31
9. "Tumbling Dice" – 5:57

== Personnel ==
The Rolling Stones

- Mick Jagger – vocals, guitar, harmonica, percussion
- Keith Richards – guitar, vocals
- Charlie Watts – drums
- Ronnie Wood – guitar, keyboards

Additional musicians

- Darryl Jones – bass
- Chuck Leavell – keyboards
- Bobby Keys – saxophone
- Bernard Fowler – backing vocals, percussion
- Lisa Fischer – backing vocals
- Blondie Chaplin – backing vocals, percussion
- Tim Ries – saxophone, keyboards
- Kent Smith – trumpet
- Michael Davis – trombone
- Jim Keltner – percussion
- Solomon Burke – vocals on "Everybody Needs Somebody to Love"

Production

- Produced by the Rolling Stones
- Mixing: Sam Wheat
- Mastering: Mazen Murad
- Design: John Moss
- Photography: Rankin, Kevin Mazur
