= Live at the Wiltern =

Live at the Wiltern may refer to:

- Live at the Wiltern (All-American Rejects album)
- Live at the Wiltern (CPR album)
- Live at the Wiltern (Florence and the Machine album)
- Live at the Wiltern (Rolling Stones album)
