= List of number-one singles of 1997 (Canada) =

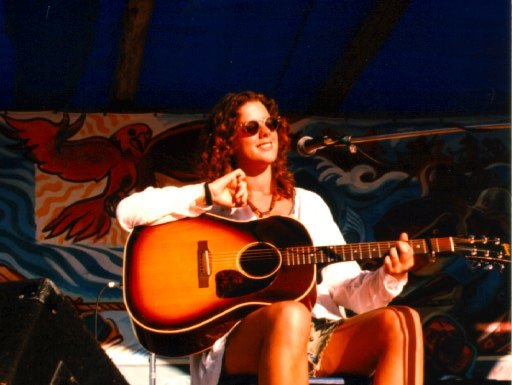
Sarah McLachlan's "Building a Mystery" was the most successful single of 1997 in Canada, peaking atop the RPM chart for eight nonconsecutive weeks.

RPM was a Canadian magazine that published the best-performing singles of Canada from 1964 to 2000. Eighteen different songs rose to number one this year, starting with "Head over Feet" by Alanis Morissette and ending with "Tubthumping" by Chumbawamba. Ten artists reached the top spot for the first time in 1997: Merril Bainbridge, OMC, No Doubt, The Wallflowers, Savage Garden, Our Lady Peace, Hanson, Sarah McLachlan, Sugar Ray, and Chumbawamba. This year, no artist achieved more than one number-one single.

Two songs spent eight weeks at number one in 1997: "Building a Mystery" by Sarah McLachlan and "Tubthumping" by Chumbawamba; the former song was the year's best-performing single. The Rolling Stones earned their ninth number-one single in 1997 with "Anybody Seen My Baby?", having first topped the RPM Singles Chart in November 1965 with "Get Off of My Cloud"; this gave them a 31-year, 11-month spread of number-one hits in Canada.

Alanis Morissette, Our Lady Peace, and Sarah McLachlan were the only Canadian acts to reach number one in their home country this year. American band The Wallflowers stayed at number one for five weeks with "One Headlight", and four acts totalled three weeks at the summit: Sheryl Crow, INXS, Hanson, and Sugar Ray.

Key
† Indicates best-performing single of 1997

== Chart history ==
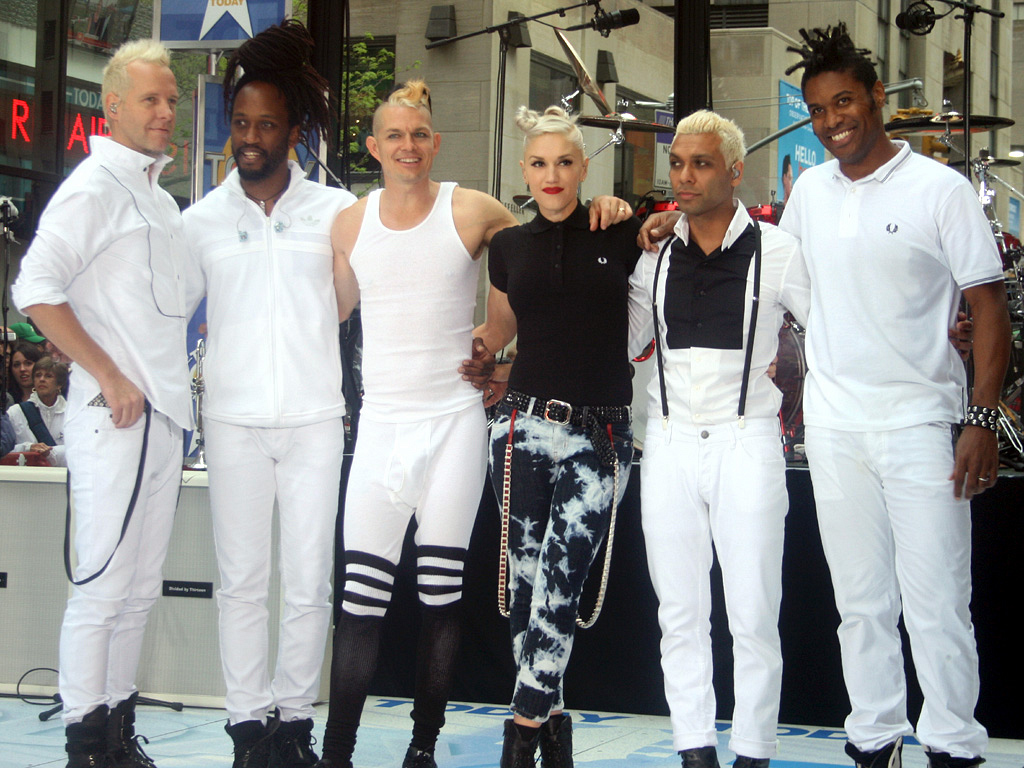
No Doubt reached number one for two weeks with "Don't Speak".

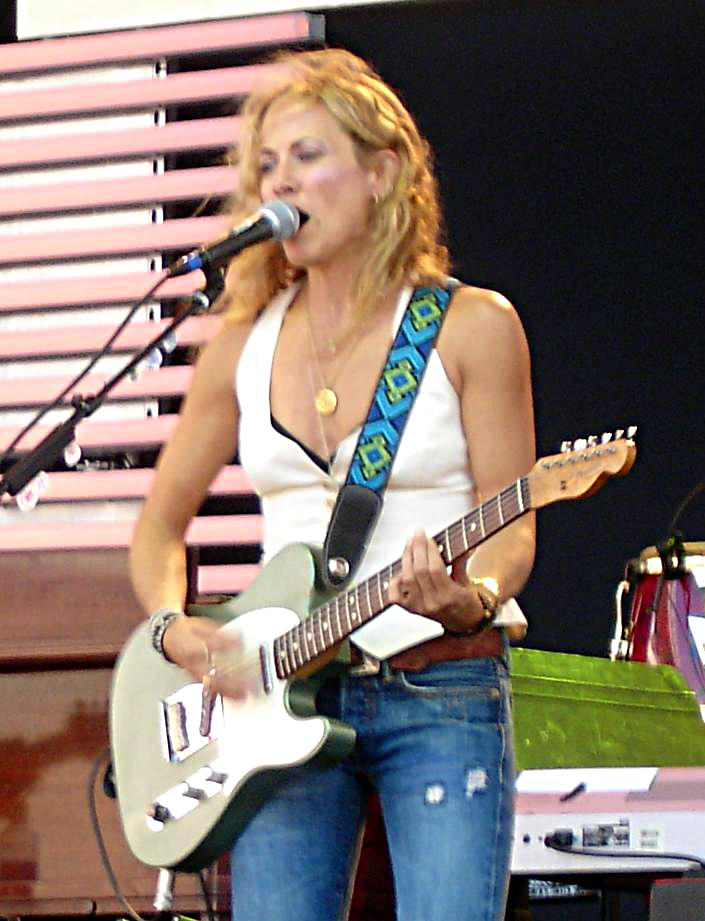
Sheryl Crow's song "Everyday Is a Winding Road" topped the chart for three weeks, giving Crow her fourth Canadian number-one hit.

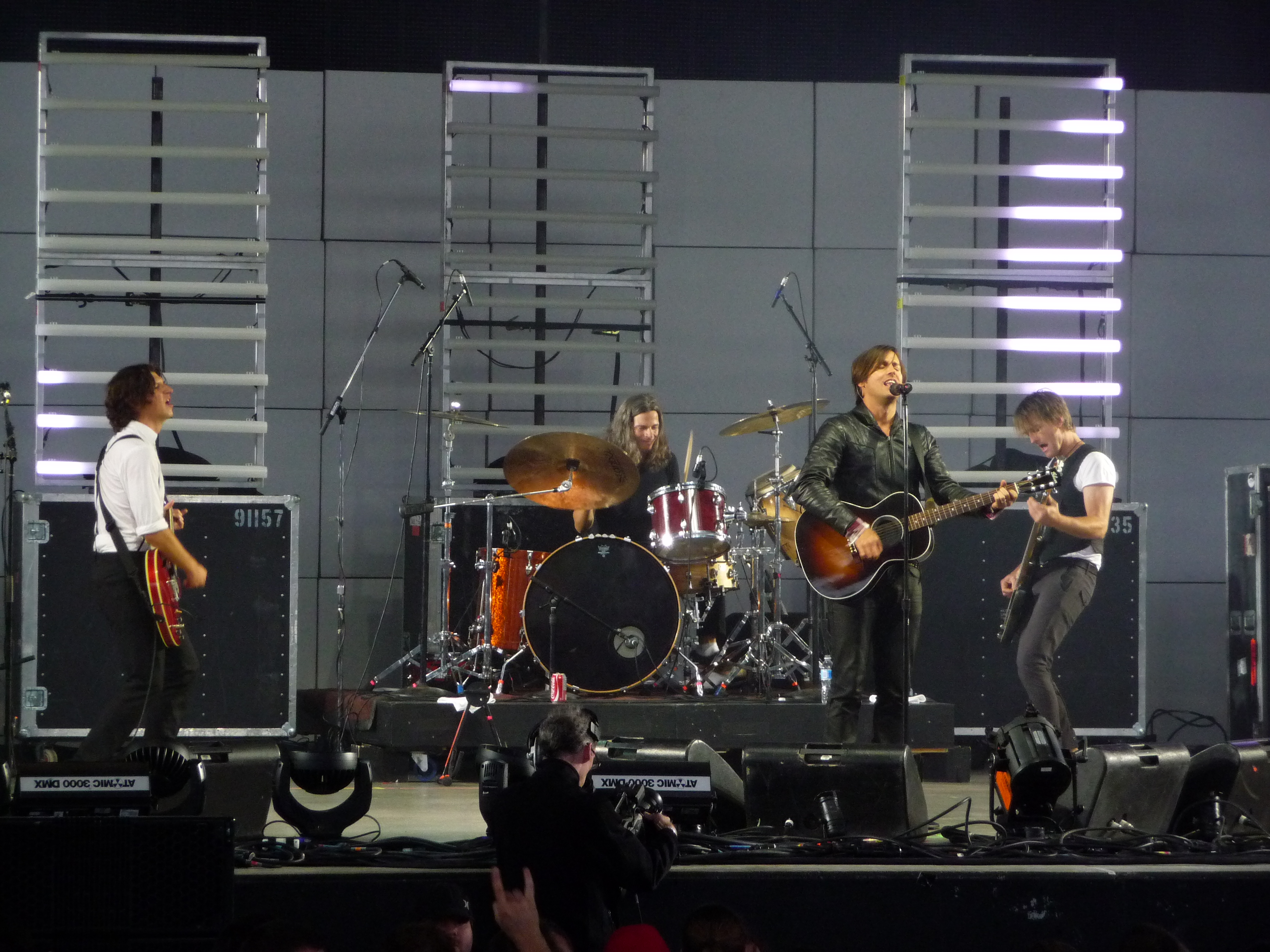
Rock band Our Lady Peace reached number one in their home country in 1997 when "Clumsy" ascended to the top spot in June.

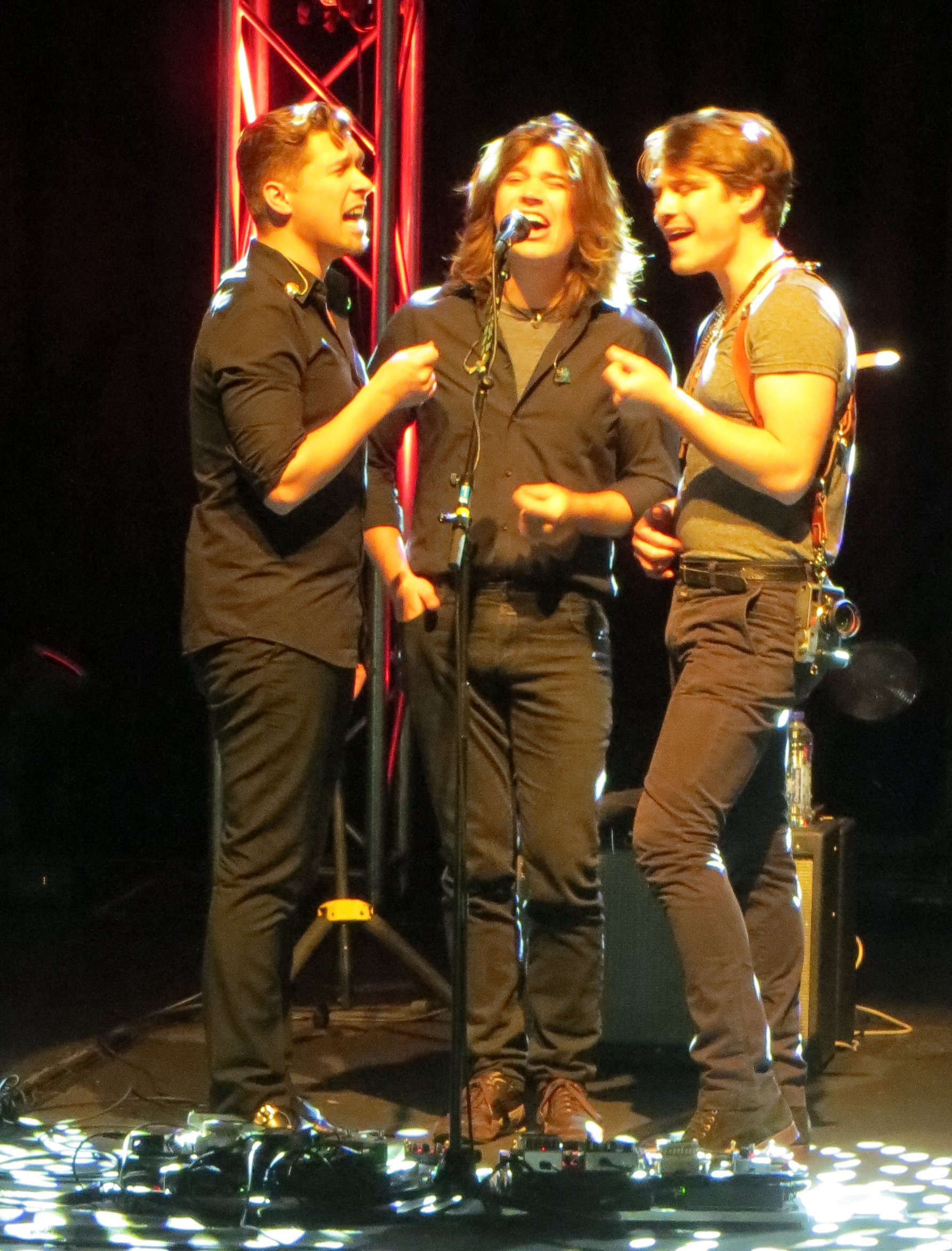
Hanson stayed at number one for three weeks with "MMMBop" in July.

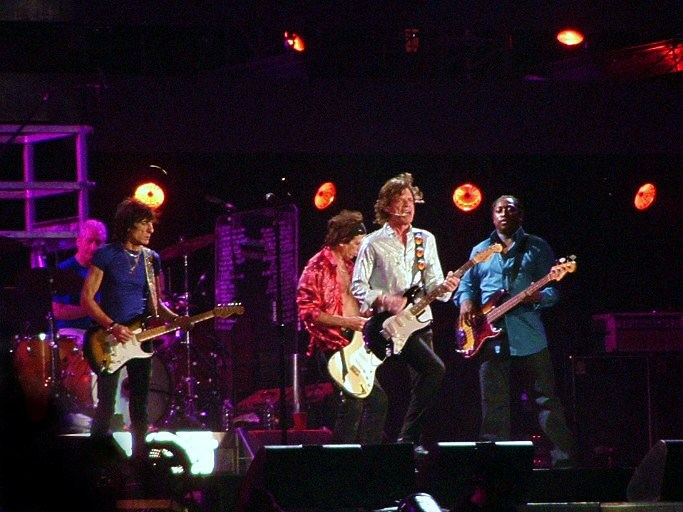
"Anybody Seen My Baby?" gave the Rolling Stones their ninth chart-topper on RPM, 31 years after their first number one.

Issue date	Song	Artist	Reference
6 January (Note: Due to a three-week break in publication over the 1996/1997 Christmas/New Year period, the week of 6 January is inferred.)	"Head over Feet"	Alanis Morissette	
13 January	"Mouth"	Merril Bainbridge	
20 January	"How Bizarre"	OMC	
27 January	"Just Another Day"	John Mellencamp	
3 February	"Just Another Day"	John Mellencamp	
10 February	"Don't Speak"	No Doubt	
17 February	"Don't Speak"	No Doubt	
24 February	"A Long December"	Counting Crows	
3 March	"A Long December"	Counting Crows	
10 March	"Everyday Is a Winding Road"	Sheryl Crow	
17 March	"Everyday Is a Winding Road"	Sheryl Crow	
24 March	"Everyday Is a Winding Road"	Sheryl Crow	
31 March	"One Headlight"	The Wallflowers	
7 April	"One Headlight"	The Wallflowers	
14 April	"One Headlight"	The Wallflowers	
21 April	"One Headlight"	The Wallflowers	
28 April	"One Headlight"	The Wallflowers	
5 May	"Staring at the Sun"	U2	
12 May	"Staring at the Sun"	U2	
19 May	"Elegantly Wasted"	INXS	
26 May	"Elegantly Wasted"	INXS	
2 June	"Elegantly Wasted"	INXS	
9 June	"I Want You"	Savage Garden	
16 June	"I Want You"	Savage Garden	
23 June	"Clumsy"	Our Lady Peace	
30 June	"Clumsy"	Our Lady Peace	
7 July	"Clumsy"	Our Lady Peace	
14 July	"MMMBop"	Hanson	
21 July	"MMMBop"	Hanson	
28 July	"MMMBop"	Hanson	
4 August	"Building a Mystery"†	Sarah McLachlan	
11 August	"Building a Mystery"†	Sarah McLachlan	
18 August	"Building a Mystery"†	Sarah McLachlan	
25 August	"Building a Mystery"†	Sarah McLachlan	
1 September	"Building a Mystery"†	Sarah McLachlan	
8 September	"Building a Mystery"†	Sarah McLachlan	
15 September	"Honey"	Mariah Carey	
22 September	"Honey"	Mariah Carey	
29 September	"Building a Mystery"†	Sarah McLachlan	
6 October	"Building a Mystery"†	Sarah McLachlan	
13 October	"Fly"	Sugar Ray	
20 October	"Fly"	Sugar Ray	
27 October	"Anybody Seen My Baby?"	The Rolling Stones	
3 November	"Fly"	Sugar Ray	
10 November	"Tubthumping"	Chumbawamba	
17 November	"Tubthumping"	Chumbawamba	
24 November	"Tubthumping"	Chumbawamba	
1 December	"Tubthumping"	Chumbawamba	
8 December	"Tubthumping"	Chumbawamba	
15 December	"Tubthumping"	Chumbawamba	
22 December (Note: Due to a three-week break in publication over the 1997/1998 Christmas/New Year period, the weeks of 22 December and 29 December are inferred.)	"Tubthumping"	Chumbawamba	
29 December	"Tubthumping"	Chumbawamba	

== See also ==
- 1997 in music
- List of Billboard Hot 100 number ones of 1997 (United States)
- List of number-one singles from the 1990s (New Zealand)
