= Anybody Seen My Baby? =

1997 single by the Rolling Stones

Single by the Rolling Stones

from the album Bridges to Babylon
- Released: 22 September 1997
- Genre: Rock
- Length: 4:31
- Label: Virgin
- Songwriters: Mick Jagger; Keith Richards; k.d. lang; Ben Mink
- Producers: Don Was; Dust Brothers; the Glimmer Twins

The Rolling Stones singles chronology
"Wild Horses" (1996)	"Anybody Seen My Baby?" (1997)	"Saint of Me" (1998)

Music video
- "Anybody Seen My Baby?" on YouTube

"Anybody Seen My Baby?" is a song by English rock band the Rolling Stones, released as the first single from their 21st British and 23rd American studio album, Bridges to Babylon (1997). It was written by band vocalist Mick Jagger and guitarist Keith Richards, and writing credits were added for k.d. lang and Ben Mink due to the similarities the chorus possesses with lang's 1992 hit "Constant Craving".

"Anybody Seen My Baby?" peaked at number 22 on the UK Singles Chart to become the band's 38th top-40 hit in their home country. It was more successful abroad, topping the RPM 100 Hit Tracks chart in Canada, and reaching the top 20 in several European countries, including Hungary and Spain. In the United States, it peaked at number three on the Billboard Mainstream Rock Tracks chart and number two on the Triple-A chart.

== Background and composition ==
Written by Mick Jagger and Keith Richards, the song also carries writing credits for k.d. lang and Ben Mink. The song is known for its chorus, which sounds strikingly similar to lang's 1992 hit song "Constant Craving". Jagger and Richards claimed to have never heard the song before, only having discovered the similarity prior to the Stones' release. As Richards reported in his autobiography Life, "My daughter Angela and a friend were at Redlands and I was playing the record and they start singing this totally different song over it. They were listening to k.d. lang's 'Constant Craving.' It was Angela and her friend that recognized it." The two gave Lang credit, along with her co-writer Mink. Lang said she was "completely honored and flattered" by receiving the songwriting credit.

Coincidentally, "Anybody Seen My Baby?" is reported to have been the title of a song written and recorded by Brian Jones after leaving the Rolling Stones. "Anybody Seen My Baby?" would go on to be the only track from Bridges to Babylon to appear on the Stones' 2002 career retrospective Forty Licks.

"Anybody Seen My Baby?" features wide-ranging inspirations, including sampling of hip-hop artist Biz Markie, making it the only song by the Rolling Stones to include sampling. Bass and keyboards on the song are performed by Jamie Muhoberac. Waddy Wachtel plays acoustic guitar and Jagger, Richards, and Wachtel play electric guitars. The song has a distinctive R&B feel, driven by Muhoberac's bass.

== Release ==
The song was a worldwide hit in 1997, reaching the top 20 in several European countries, number one on Canada's Top Singles and Alternative 30 charts, and number three on Billboard's Mainstream Rock Tracks chart in the United States.

== Critical reception ==
British magazine Music Week rated the song four out of five, stating that "this is top-form Stones co-written, co-produced and part-played by non-Stones."

== Music video ==
The accompanying music video for "Anybody Seen My Baby?" features American actress Angelina Jolie. She appears as a stripper who leaves mid-performance to wander New York City. Two versions of the video exist, with minor differences between them.

== Live performances ==
The song has only been played a total of 72 times; almost of these performances occurred during the Bridges to Babylon tour. The song was played just one more time in 2016 during the América Latina Olé tour and has not been played since then.

== Personnel ==
Personnel adapted from CD liner notes

The Rolling Stones

- Mick Jagger – lead vocals, guitar
- Keith Richards – guitar, backing vocals
- Ronnie Wood – guitar
- Charlie Watts – drums

Additional musicians

- Blondie Chaplin – backing vocals, shaker
- Bernard Fowler – backing vocals
- Biz Markie – rapping
- Jamie Muhoberac – bass, keyboards
- Waddy Wachtel – electric guitar, acoustic guitar
- Don Was – keyboards

== Charts ==
=== Weekly charts ===
Chart (1997)	Peak position
Australia (ARIA)	58
Austria (Ö3 Austria Top 40)	12
Belgium (Ultratip Bubbling Under Flanders)	2
Canada Top Singles (RPM)	1
Canada Adult Contemporary (RPM)	4
Canada Rock/Alternative (RPM)	1
Europe (Eurochart Hot 100)	18
European Radio Top 50 (Music & Media)	1
Finland (Suomen virallinen lista)	11
Germany (GfK)	24
Hungary (Mahasz)	2
Iceland (Íslenski Listinn Topp 40)	15
Italy (Musica e dischi)	20
Netherlands (Dutch Top 40)	12
Netherlands (Single Top 100)	25
Norway (VG-lista)	14
Scottish Singles Sales (Official Charts)	18
Spain (AFYVE)	4
Sweden (Sverigetopplistan)	18
Switzerland (Schweizer Hitparade)	26
UK Singles (Official Charts)	22
US Adult Alternative Airplay (Billboard)	2
US Heritage Rock (Billboard)	1
US Mainstream Rock (Billboard)	3

=== Year-end charts ===
Chart (1997)	Position
Canada Top Singles (RPM)	19
Canada Adult Contemporary (RPM)	41
Canada Rock/Alternative (RPM)	27
Iceland (Íslenski Listinn Topp 40)	85
Romania (Romanian Top 100)	35
US Mainstream Rock Tracks (Billboard)	39
US Triple-A (Billboard)	27

== Release history ==
Region	Date	Format(s)	Label(s)	Ref.
United Kingdom	22 September 1997	7-inch vinyl; CD; cassette	Virgin	
Japan	29 October 1997	CD	Virgin	

== See also ==
- List of Number one singles on the European Hit Radio chart
- List of RPM number-one singles of 1997 (Canada)
- List of RPM Rock/Alternative number-one singles (Canada)
- "Break My Heart", another song in which a writing credit was given due to a similar chorus
