= Bridges to Babylon =

Studio album by the Rolling Stones
- Released: 29 September 1997
- Recorded: 13 March – July 1997
- Studios: Ocean Way Recording (Los Angeles, California)
- Genre: Rock
- Length: 62:27
- Label: Virgin
- Producers: Don Was, The Glimmer Twins, with Rob Fraboni, Danny Saber, Pierre de Beauport, and The Dust Brothers

The Rolling Stones chronology
Stripped (1995)	Bridges to Babylon (1997)	No Security (1998)

The Rolling Stones studio album chronology
Voodoo Lounge (1994)	Bridges to Babylon (1997)	A Bigger Bang (2005)

Singles from Bridges to Babylon
- 1. "Anybody Seen My Baby?" Released: 22 September 1997; 2. "Saint of Me" Released: 26 January 1998; 3. "Out of Control" Released: August 1998

Bridges to Babylon is the twenty-first British and twenty-third American studio album by the English rock band the Rolling Stones. It was released on 29 September 1997, through Virgin Records. The album contains contributions from a host of producers—Don Was, returning from Voodoo Lounge (1994), as well as the Dust Brothers, Danny Saber, Rob Fraboni and Pierre de Beauport—with all of the tracks also being produced by Mick Jagger and Keith Richards (as "the Glimmer Twins"). The album contains a multitude of musical styles, such as rock and roll, blues, reggae, and electronic music, as a result of Jagger's desire to mix the band's traditional sound with the contemporary styles of the day.

Upon release, Bridges to Babylon sold well and received mostly positive reviews. Its lead single, "Anybody Seen My Baby?", was a worldwide top 40 hit and was successful on US rock and alternative radio. The album reached the top 3 in the US and topped the charts throughout Europe, though it became the band's first (and, to date, only) album to peak outside the top 5 in the UK. Reviewers were divided on the merits of the band's experiments with then-current trends and styles, though certain tracks were consistently singled out for praise. The following Bridges to Babylon Tour ran through 1997 and 1998 and was extremely successful, becoming the second-highest-grossing tour at the time.

== Background and recording ==
Following the Voodoo Lounge Tour from 1994 to 1995, and the album Stripped, the Stones afforded themselves a brief respite before Mick Jagger and Keith Richards began composing new songs together in the summer of 1996, with demos to follow as they met in New York in November and London the following month. Another writing session took place in Barbados in January 1997.

In March 1997, the band arrived in Los Angeles to start the recording sessions at Ocean Way Studios. After many albums recorded in isolated islands, working in a big city allowed for the contribution of various musician friends of the band. Bridges to Babylon was recorded until July, and the four-month production made it one of their most concise periods of recording in years. The sessions were frequently all-nighters that lasted until Richards got tired by the morning.

Although Don Was produced again, Jagger arrived before the other members of the Stones to seek local producers. First were The Dust Brothers, who had impressed Jagger with their work on Beck's Odelay and the Beastie Boys' Paul's Boutique. The Dust Brothers' contributions were initially five, but were reduced to three, which marked the only Stones songs to feature sampling. Danny Saber and Babyface were also brought in by Jagger, though the latter's contributions to the track "Already Over Me" were eventually discarded. Richards was not keen on the idea of working with 'loop gurus', going as far as expelling Saber from the studio once he found him overdubbing guitars. Richards brought in Rob Fraboni for his solo material, and Was made sure to work with Richards and Jagger in separate rooms. Drummer Charlie Watts would relieve the tense environment by working with percussionist Jim Keltner, whom he later drafted for a solo project. By the final week of recording, the Stones were not on speaking terms, with Jagger boycotting sessions arranged by Richards' crew and Watts leaving Los Angeles as soon as he finished his contributions.

During the album's mastering, the chorus of the projected lead single, "Anybody Seen My Baby?", was found to resemble the 1992 hit "Constant Craving" by k.d. lang, a discovery brought to Richards' attention by his daughter Angela. Seeking to avoid possible future legal entanglements, Lang and her co-writer Ben Mink were credited along with Jagger and Richards on the new tune. It reached No. 22 in the UK and also became a US radio rock hit.

A total of nine different musicians played bass on the sessions for the album: Jeff Sarli, Blondie Chaplin, Jamie Muhoberac, Pierre de Beauport, Don Was, Danny Saber, Darryl Jones, Me'shell Ndegeocello, and Doug Wimbish.

== Packaging ==
Once the Rolling Stones had picked Stefan Sagmeister to be the album's art director, Jagger told him to seek inspiration from Babylonian art exhibited at the British Museum. Sagmeister was most impressed by a Lamassu sculpture featuring a lion with a human head and beard and commissioned artist Kevin Murphy to paint a similar Assyrian lion in an attack stance. The first million units of Bridges to Babylon were encased in a specially manufactured filigree slipcase that gave the impression that the lion was embedded into the design. The desert background of the cover was extended throughout the booklet, featuring ruins that were the basis for the stage design of the Bridges to Babylon Tour.

== Release and reception ==
Bridges to Babylon reached No. 6 in the UK, No. 2 in France and No. 3 in the US, where it was certified platinum by the RIAA in November 1997. As of January 2010, it had sold 1.1 million copies in the US. Further singles "Saint of Me" and concert staple "Out of Control" were also minor hits. By this point, the Stones had become a touring phenomenon. The Bridges to Babylon Tour in 1997 consisted of 108 concerts, with an elaborate stage design Jagger aimed to make similar to U2's PopMart Tour. In 2009, Bridges to Babylon was remastered and reissued by Universal Music.

=== Critical reception ===
Professional ratings
Review scores
Source	Rating
AllMusic	2.5/5 stars
Christgau's Consumer Guide	(1-star Honorable Mention)
Entertainment Weekly	B
NME	7/10
Rolling Stone	4/5 stars
The Rolling Stone Album Guide	3/5 stars
Select	3/5 medals
Tom Hull	B+
Uncut	3/5 stars

Bridges to Babylon was released to mixed-to-positive reviews. Rolling Stone writer Mark Kemp found that the majority of the album "come[s] off feral without sounding forced [and] contemporary without succumbing to modern-rock trendiness". Kemp praised the band's collaboration with contemporary producers and the integration of new sounds and styles, while also highlighting the three Richards vocals as "some of the stronger songs" on the record. Paul Moody of the NME praised the "bizarre brilliance" of "Saint of Me", "Thief in the Night", and "Might as Well Get Juiced", citing the record as evidence that the band had "pretty much seen off the curse of age-old pop group reality". Rockpile's Lorraine Gennaro stated the record "has everything Stones fans have come to know and love", highlighting Richards' playing as "still sound[ing] oh-so-sweet". Hits declared that "The Glimmer Twins are back with piss, vinegar and a really megalithic cash-cow tour", finding that "beneath the beasty/flowery cover art of Bridges... rocks an album with magnitude to match". Ken Richardson of Stereo Review considered the album to be the band's best since Tattoo You (1981), arguing that its songs would "remain as vital as Tattoo's touchstones, 'Start Me Up' and 'Waiting on a Friend'".

Ken Tucker of Entertainment Weekly called Bridges to Babylon a "frantic, scattered work", considering the band's attempts to "connect with contemporary styles" to be "shrewd" but "pointless". However, he praised the latter part of the record, describing "Might as Well Get Juiced" as "an oily hymn to dissolution, exhilarating in its bleakness" and declaring the final two tracks to be among "the most heart-slashing work the Stones have ever cut". After panning Voodoo Lounge as "wretched", Select was more positive towards Bridges to Babylon. Writer Andrew Perry praised the album's ballads as "uniformly excellent", while also highlighting Richards' lead vocal appearances and the band's collaborations with the Dust Brothers. Robert Christgau was more lukewarm, giving the album a one-star honorable mention and stating the band "still know[s] how to construct, play, and—sometimes—sing a song". A negative review from the Los Angeles Times derided the record as a "ballad-heavy collection [which] is bland enough in spirit and attitude to make you long for the good old days of gratuitous controversy and sexist swagger".

Retrospective reviews are more mixed. AllMusic's Stephen Thomas Erlewine rated the album positively, commending the band for "work[ing] within its limitations" in regards to incorporating new styles and working with contemporary producers, further stating that the album's biggest strength was its "solid, craftsmanlike songwriting". Revisiting the album in 2018, Tom Hull gave the album a B+, opining that it finds the band "developing a sense of nuance – something they've never had much interest in before, or for that matter much need of." Conversely, Nick DeRiso of Ultimate Classic Rock considered the album to be hampered by "dated experimentation", criticizing the more contemporary material and regarding the record as a whole to be "an utterly bloodless detour away from everything that once made the Rolling Stones interesting in the first place." DeRiso reserved praise for Richards' contributions, praising it as "some of his strongest material", but ultimately felt that they "could not re-balance a recording that simply spent too much time chasing now-outmoded trends."

Rankings of the band's entire discography tend to place Bridges to Babylon near the bottom. The NME ranked it second-to-last, calling it "undoubtedly the nadir in Mick and Keith’s songwriting partnership". Ultimate Classic Rock also ranked the record as the band's second-worst, finding its "'modern' touches" to sound "hopelessly dated", while finding the more traditional rock-and-roll tracks to be "potent" and "intense", yet not "melodically memorable". Louder Sound ranked the album 21st, stating that despite the numerous producers and session musicians, there is "a lot to love" about the record. The album appeared at number 24 on BBC Music Magazine's list, which stated that while the record is "ambitious", it also is "a bit of a muddled identity crisis", though the publication reserved praise for Richards' ballads. Esquire ranked the album as the band's worst, denouncing it as a "schizophrenic album" that unsuccessfully tried integrating the dominant musical styles of the time. Conversely, Rolling Stone included the album on their list of the "100 Best Albums of the '90s", finding that "everything sounds vivified" on the record and that the band were "up for invigoration".

== Track listing ==
All tracks are written by Mick Jagger and Keith Richards, except where noted.

Bridges to Babylon track listing
No.	Title	Writer(s)	Producer(s)	Length
1.	"Flip the Switch"		Don Was; The Glimmer Twins	3:28
2.	"Anybody Seen My Baby?"	Jagger–Richards; K.D. Lang; Ben Mink	Was; Dust Brothers; The Glimmer Twins	4:31
3.	"Low Down"		Was; The Glimmer Twins	4:26
4.	"Already Over Me"		Was; The Glimmer Twins	5:24
5.	"Gunface"		Danny Saber; The Glimmer Twins	5:02
6.	"You Don't Have to Mean It"		Was; Rob Fraboni; The Glimmer Twins	3:44
7.	"Out of Control"		Was; The Glimmer Twins	4:43
8.	"Saint of Me"		Dust Brothers; The Glimmer Twins	5:15
9.	"Might as Well Get Juiced"		Dust Brothers; The Glimmer Twins	5:23
10.	"Always Suffering"		Was; Pierre de Beauport; The Glimmer Twins	4:43
11.	"Too Tight"		Was; The Glimmer Twins	3:33
12.	"Thief in the Night"	Jagger–Richards; de Beauport	Was; The Glimmer Twins	5:15
13.	"How Can I Stop"		Was; The Glimmer Twins	6:53
Total length:				62:27

== Personnel ==
Personnel adapted from CD liner notes

The Rolling Stones

- Mick Jagger – lead vocals (all except 6, 12, 13), guitar (2, 5, 10), harmonica (7, 9), keyboards (8, 9), guitar [wah-wah] (7), shaker (7), acoustic guitar (4, 8)
- Keith Richards – guitar (all except 8, 12), backing vocals (1–4, 7, 10, 11), lead vocals (6, 12, 13), acoustic guitar (12), piano (12), handclaps (1)
- Ronnie Wood – guitar (1–3, 6–8, 11–13), slide guitar (3, 5, 9), pedal steel guitar (10, 11), Dobro (4), baritone guitar (4)
- Charlie Watts – drums (all tracks), backing vocals (10)

Additional musicians

- Darryl Jones – bass guitar (6, 10, 12), backing vocals (10)
- Me'Shell Ndegeocello – bass guitar (8)
- Danny Saber – bass guitar (5, 7), guitar (5), keyboards (5), clavinet (7), "reality manipulations" (7)
- Jeff Sarli – bass guitar (1), acoustic bass (11, 13)
- Don Was – bass guitar (4), keyboards (2, 7), Wurlitzer piano (7, 13)
- Blondie Chaplin – bass guitar (3), backing vocals (all except 5, 9), shaker (2) maracas (3), piano (4, 11, 13), tambourine (1, 10–12)
- Pierre de Beauport – bass six (8), Wurlitzer piano (12), Fender Rhodes piano (12)
- Jamie Muhoberac – bass guitar (2), keyboards (2, 7, 8)
- Doug Wimbish – backing vocals (10), bass guitar (9)
- Waddy Wachtel – electric guitar (1–3, 7, 9, 11), guitar (8, 12, 13), acoustic guitar (2, 10), backing vocals (10)
- Clinton Clifford – piano (6), Hammond B-3 organ (6)
- Billy Preston – organ (8)
- Benmont Tench – Hammond C-3 organ (4), keyboards (4), piano (10), Hammond B-3 organ (10)
- Darrell Leonard – trumpet (3, 6, 12)
- Wayne Shorter – soprano saxophone (13)
- Joe Sublett – baritone saxophone (1), saxophone (3, 6, 12)
- Biz Markie – rapping (2)
- Bernard Fowler – backing vocals (all except 5, 9)
- Jim Keltner – percussion (1, 4–7, 10–13), shaker (3), backing vocals (10)
- Kenny Aronoff – bucket (4)

Production

- The Glimmer Twins – production (all tracks)
- Don Was – production (all except 5, 8, 9)
- The Dust Brothers – production (2, 8 and 9)
- Rob Fraboni – production, mixing (6), engineering
- Danny Saber – production (5)
- Pierre de Beauport – production (10)
- Tom Lord-Alge – mixing
- John X Volaitis – mixing (5)
- Bob Clearmountain – mixing (4)
- Stefan Sagmeister – art direction and design
- Hjalti Karlsson – design
- Max Vadukul – photography
- Kevin Murphy – illustration
- Gerard Howland (Floating Company) – illustration
- Alan Ayers – illustration

== Charts ==
=== Weekly charts ===
1997–1998 weekly chart performance for Bridges to Babylon
Chart (1997–1998)	Peak position
Australian Albums (ARIA)	19
Austrian Albums (Ö3 Austria)	1
Belgian Albums (Ultratop Flanders)	2
Belgian Albums (Ultratop Wallonia)	5
Canadian Albums (Billboard)	2
Danish Albums (Hitlisten)	3
Dutch Albums (Album Top 100)	2
Finnish Albums (Suomen virallinen lista)	3
French Albums (SNEP)	2
German Albums (Offizielle Top 100)	1
Hungarian Albums (MAHASZ)	12
Italian Albums (Musica e Dischi)	6
Japanese Albums (Oricon)	10
New Zealand Albums (RMNZ)	10
Norwegian Albums (VG-lista)	1
Spanish Albums (PROMUSICAE)	2
Swedish Albums (Sverigetopplistan)	1
Swiss Albums (Schweizer Hitparade)	3
UK Albums (Official Charts)	6
US Billboard 200	3

=== Year-end charts ===
1997 year-end chart performance for Bridges to Babylon
Chart (1997)	Position
German Albums Chart	10

1998 year-end chart performance for Bridges to Babylon
Chart (1998)	Position
German Albums Chart	26

== Certifications and sales ==
Certifications and sales for Bridges to Babylon
Region	Certification	Certified units/sales
Argentina (CAPIF)	Platinum	60,000^{^}
Austria (IFPI Austria)	Platinum	50,000^{*}
Belgium (BRMA)	Gold	25,000^{*}
Canada (Music Canada)	Platinum	100,000^{^}
France (SNEP)	2× Gold	200,000^{*}
Germany (BVMI)	Platinum	500,000^{^}
Italy	—	90,000
Japan (RIAJ)	Platinum	200,000^{^}
Mexico (AMPROFON)	Gold	50,000
Netherlands (NVPI)	Platinum	100,000^{^}
Norway (IFPI Norway)	Gold	25,000^{*}
Poland (ZPAV)	Gold	50,000^{*}
Spain (Promusicae)	Platinum	100,000^{^}
Sweden (GLF)	Gold	40,000^{^}
Switzerland (IFPI Switzerland)	Platinum	50,000^{^}
United Kingdom (BPI)	Gold	100,000^{^}
United States (RIAA)	Platinum	1,160,000
Summaries
Europe (IFPI)	Platinum	1,000,000^{*}
Worldwide	—	3,500,000 - 4,000,000
^{*} Sales figures based on certification alone.^{^} Shipments figures based on certification alone.
