= Gimme Shelter =

1969 song by The Rolling Stones

- 1975 French re-release

Song by the Rolling Stones

from the album Let It Bleed
- Released: 28 November 1969
- Recorded: 23 February–2 November 1969
- Genre: Hard rock; blues rock; roots rock
- Length: 4:37
- Label: Decca (UK); London (US)
- Songwriter: Jagger–Richards
- Producer: Jimmy Miller

"Gimme Shelter" (Note: Original pressings of Let It Bleed spelled the title as "Gimmie Shelter", although the current form has been adopted as far more widely recognised.) is a song by the British rock band the Rolling Stones. Written by Jagger–Richards, it is the opening track of the band's 1969 album Let It Bleed. The song covers the brutal realities of war, including murder, rape and fear. It features prominent guest vocals by American singer Merry Clayton.

American author, music journalist and cultural critic Greil Marcus, writing for Rolling Stone magazine at the time of its release, praised the song, stating that the band has "never done anything better". "Gimme Shelter" has placed in various positions on many "best of" and "greatest" lists including that of Rolling Stone magazine. In 2021 "Gimme Shelter" was ranked at number 13 on Rolling Stone's list of the "500 Greatest Songs of All Time".

== Background ==
"Gimme Shelter" was written by the Rolling Stones' lead singer Mick Jagger and guitarist Keith Richards, the band's primary songwriting team. (Note: The Mick Jagger and Keith Richards writing team is commonly referred to as the "Glimmer Twins" and has occasionally been credited as such on releases.) Richards began working on the song's signature opening riff in London while Jagger was away filming Performance with Richards' girlfriend, Anita Pallenberg. In his autobiography Life, Richards revealed that the tension of the song was inspired by his jealousy at seeing the relationship between Pallenberg and Jagger, and his suspicions of an affair between them.

When speaking of Clayton's inclusion in the recording, Jagger stated in the 2003 book According to the Rolling Stones that the Rolling Stones' producer Jimmy Miller thought of having a female singer on the track and told fellow producer Jack Nitzsche to contact one, "The use of the female voice was the producer's idea. It would be one of those moments along the lines of 'I hear a girl on this track – get one on the phone.'"

== Recording ==
The song was recorded in London at Olympic Studios in February and March 1969; the vocals were recorded in Los Angeles at Sunset Sound Recorders and Elektra Studios in October and November that same year. Nicky Hopkins played piano, Jimmy Miller played percussion, Charlie Watts played drums, Bill Wyman played bass, Jagger played harmonica and sang backup vocals with Richards and Merry Clayton. Clayton was summoned from bed around midnight by Nitzsche, Clayton – about four months pregnant – made her recording with just a few takes and then returned home to bed. Guitarist Brian Jones was absent during these sessions, Richards being credited with rhythm and lead guitars on the album sleeve. Upon returning home, Clayton suffered a miscarriage, attributed by some sources to her exertions during the recording.

For the recording, Richards used an Australian-made Maton SE777, a large single-cutaway hollowbody guitar, which he had previously used on "Midnight Rambler". The guitar barely survived the recording before literally falling apart. "[O]n the very last note of 'Gimme Shelter,'" Richards told Guitar World in 2002, "the whole neck fell off. You can hear it on the original take."

Clayton's performance remains the most prominent contribution to a Rolling Stones track by a female vocalist. (The October 2023 release of "Sweet Sounds of Heaven" on their album Hackney Diamonds featured Lady Gaga, whom producer Andrew Watt described as "almost embodying Merry Clayton" on the track.) Clayton's name was mistakenly written 'Mary' on the original release (her given name is "Merry" due to her being born on Christmas Day). Her name is also listed as "Mary" on the 2002 Let It Bleed remastered CD.

== Composition ==
Gimme Shelter
A sample of the first verse

Jagger described the song in an interview with NPR as "a very moody piece about the world closing in on you a bit ... When it was recorded, early '69 or something, it was a time of war and tension, so that's reflected in this tune." The song's inspiration came from Richards seeing people scurrying for shelter from a sudden rain storm. He recalls: "I had been sitting by the window of my friend Robert Fraser's apartment on Mount Street in London with an acoustic guitar when suddenly the sky went completely black and an incredible monsoon came down. It was just people running about looking for shelter – that was the germ of the idea. We went further into it until it became, you know, rape and murder are 'just a shot away'.

As released, the song begins with Richards performing a guitar intro, soon joined by Jagger's lead vocal. After the first verse is sung by Jagger, Clayton enters and they share the next three verses. A harmonica solo by Jagger and guitar solo by Richards follow. Then, with great energy, Clayton repeatedly sings "Rape, murder! It's just a shot away! It's just a shot away!", almost screaming the final stanza. She and Jagger then repeat the line "It's just a shot away" and finish with repeats of "It's just a kiss away". At about three minutes into the song, Clayton's voice cracks under the strain; once during the second refrain on the word "shot", then on the word "murder" during the third refrain, after which Jagger is faintly heard exclaiming "Woo!" in response to Clayton's powerful delivery.

== Live performances ==
"Gimme Shelter" quickly became a staple of the Rolling Stones' live shows. It was first performed sporadically during their 1969 American Tour and became a regular addition to their setlist during the 1972 American Tour. For these live renditions, all vocals were handled by Mick Jagger. These performances are now famous instead for the finely crafted solos by lead guitarist Mick Taylor, who however did not play on the studio recording of the song. The female contributor to the live version of the song was Lisa Fischer from 1989 to 2015, Sasha Allen from 2016 to 2022, and for the 2024 North American tour, Chanel Haynes. Chanel Haynes also stood in on the 2022 European tour for a single performance in Milan on 21 June 2022. In their 2012 50th anniversary tour, the Rolling Stones sang this song with Mary J. Blige, Florence Welch, and Lady Gaga.

Other concert versions appear on the Stones' albums No Security (recorded 1997, released 1998), Live Licks (recorded 2003, released 2004), Brussels Affair (recorded 1973, released 2011), and Hyde Park Live (2013). A May 1995 performance recorded at Paradiso (Amsterdam) was released on the 1996 "Wild Horses" (live) single, on the 1998 "Saint of Me" single (included in the 45-CD 2011 box set The Singles 1971–2006), and again on Totally Stripped in 2016. In 2023, a version of the song, featuring Lady Gaga, was included on their 50th-anniversary live tour album, GRRR Live! – Live at Newark.

== Reception ==
"Gimme Shelter" was never released as a single. Nevertheless, it has been included on many compilation releases, including Gimme Shelter, Hot Rocks 1964–1971, Forty Licks, and GRRR! Greil Marcus, writing for Rolling Stone magazine at the time of "Gimme Shelter"'s release, stated that "[t]he Stones have never done anything better". Pitchfork placed it at number 12 on its list of "The 200 Greatest Songs of the 1960s". Ultimate Classic Rock put the song at number one on their Top 100 Rolling Stones songs and number three on their Top 100 Classic Rock Songs.

It is ranked number 13 on Rolling Stone's 500 Greatest Songs of All Time list. It is also ranked number 1 on the magazine's list of the band's best songs.

== Personnel ==
According to authors Philippe Margotin and Jean-Michel Guesdon:

The Rolling Stones

- Mick Jagger – lead vocals, harmonica
- Keith Richards – backing vocals, lead and rhythm guitars
- Bill Wyman – bass
- Charlie Watts – drums

Additional personnel

- Merry Clayton – lead and backing vocals
- Nicky Hopkins – piano
- Jimmy Miller – güiro, maracas (Note: While Margotin and Guesdon credit güiro and maracas to Miller, authors Andy Babiuk and Greg Prevost write Miller contributed tambourine.)

== In popular culture ==
"Gimme Shelter" has been featured in a variety of films, television shows and commercials. The 1970 documentary film Gimme Shelter, directed by Albert and David Maysles and Charlotte Zwerin, chronicling the last weeks of the Stones' 1969 US tour and culminating in the disastrous Altamont Free Concert, took its name from the song. A live version of the song played over the documentary's credits. The song has appeared in the films Air America, The Fan, Layer Cake, and Flight, and it was used in Martin Scorsese's Goodfellas, Casino and The Departed. In what the New York Times calls "a bit of a troll," the 2026 film Melania begins with a long approach shot of Mar-a-Lago while “Gimme Shelter" plays in the background.

The French filmmaker Michel Gondry directed a video using the song as musical backing, which was released in 1998. The video features a sixteen-year old Brad Renfro, playing a young man escaping with his brother from a dysfunctional home and the abuse they suffered at the hands of their abusive alcoholic father, and then from society as a whole. The Hills of California, a 2024 play by Jez Butterworth, features the track.

The song also appeared in Ladies and Gentlemen: The Rolling Stones, a film of the Stones' 1972 North American Tour, as well as on its 2010 official DVD release. It is further featured on the concert DVD/Blu-ray sets Bridges to Babylon Tour '97–98 (1998), Four Flicks (2003), The Biggest Bang (2013), Totally Stripped (2016), and Havana Moon (2016).

== Certifications ==
Region	Certification	Certified units/sales
Australia (ARIA)	3× Platinum	210,000^{‡}
Denmark (IFPI Danmark)	Gold	45,000^{‡}
Italy (FIMI)	Gold	25,000^{‡}
New Zealand (RMNZ)	3× Platinum	90,000^{‡}
Spain (Promusicae)	Gold	30,000^{‡}
United Kingdom (BPI)	2× Platinum	1,200,000^{‡}
^{‡} Sales+streaming figures based on certification alone.

== Notable cover versions ==
- Merry Clayton, who performed with Mick Jagger on the Rolling Stones version of the song (see above), released a cover of "Gimme Shelter" in 1970 on her first solo album, also titled Gimme Shelter. The song reached No. 63 in Canada.
- American rock band Grand Funk Railroad covered and included it on their fourth studio album, Survival (1971). It was released as a single and reached 61 on the Billboard Hot 100 chart.
- British rock band the Sisters of Mercy recorded their version as the B-side to the single "Temple of Love" in 1983.
- U2 covered the song at the Rock and Roll Hall of Fame benefit concert on 30 October 2009, with Mick Jagger sharing lead vocals with Bono and featuring the Black Eyed Peas members Fergie, singing Merry Clayton's vocal part, and will.i.am, playing piano and synthesizer.
- Paolo Nutini covered the song and was asked by Mick Jagger and Ben Affleck to perform the track for a documentary of the same name on the plight of the millions of people displaced from their homes as a result of fighting in the Sudanese region.

=== Puddle of Mudd recording ===
"Gimme Shelter" is a 2011 single by the American rock band Puddle of Mudd, and a cover of the song. "Gimme Shelter" was released as the lead single from Re:(disc)overed on 2 August 2011, a collection of cover versions of classic rock songs from the 1960s and 1970s and made available digitally on iTunes and Amazon Music with an official music video premiering on the Puddle of Mudd YouTube channel on 17 September 2011. In order to promote the single and the album, on 7 October 2011, the group performed the song live on The Tonight Show with Jay Leno and announced a fall tour.

Following the end of the touring cycle for their 2009 album Volume 4: Songs in the Key of Love & Hate, the band entered Bomb Shelter Studios in Los Angeles in March 2011 to begin working on new music for their next album. According to guitarist Paul Phillips, the band originally intended to write new material but initial attempts to write new original material stalled due to burnout from years of constant touring and recording. Frustrated with the lack of enthusiasm in the new songs, the band decided to pivot to recording cover songs for a full-length studio album. The band spent three consecutive weeks in the studio with producer Bill Appleberry, fully completing the album by early April, in which time "Gimme Shelter" was recorded.

In various interviews, Scantlin and Philips stated that they had previously compiled a list of around 30 songs from the 1970s and 1980s, which they then narrowed down to 14 tracks for the final cut. Phillips explained that the first idea for the band to release a potential cover album first evolved naturally after the group began performing songs like AC/DC's "T.N.T." and "The Joker" by the Steve Miller Band during their live shows just for fun, which he stated that fans seemed to enjoy.

During the recording of "Gimme Shelter", the group recruited additional musicians to contribute to the song; most notably, BC Jean and various other uncredited female backing vocalists were brought in to recreate the haunting vocal parts made famous by Merry Clayton on the original Rolling Stones track. In interviews after the single's release, the band revealed that the recording sessions were deliberately approached with a live, organic methodology with very few takes to capture a raw and unpolished energy, aiming to minimize the use of Pro Tools.

==== Critical reception ====
Critical reception to the song was mixed. Loudwire praised the band's energy and praised the addition of "bluesy female vocal harmonies" and a "dose of attitude". Anne Erickson of Ultimate Classic Rock called the track a "shining example" of the band's reverence for classic rock, praising its "authenticity" and "youthful hard rock edge".

Other critics were less favorable, Stephen Thomas Erlewine from Allmusic noted that while the band executed faithful renditions of classic tracks, their approach to "Gimme Shelter" felt overly literal and lacked reinterpretation. Audio Eclectica listed the cover among its "Worst Cover Songs", citing Scantlin's vocal delivery as "grating".

=== "Putting Our House in Order" project ===
In 1993, a Food Records project collected various versions of the track by the following bands and collaborations, the proceeds of which went to the Shelter charity's "Putting Our House in Order" homeless initiative. The versions were issued across various formats, featuring on some also a live version of the song by the Rolling Stones.

"Gimme Shelter" (pop version – CD and cassette single)

- Voice of the Beehive and Jimmy Somerville
- Heaven 17 with Hannah Jones

"Gimme Shelter" (alternative version – CD single)

- New Model Army and Tom Jones
- Cud and Sandie Shaw
- Kingmaker

"Gimme Shelter" (rock version – CD single)

- Thunder
- Little Angels
- Hawkwind and Samantha Fox

"Gimme Shelter" (dance version – 12" single)

- 808 State and Robert Owens
- Pop Will Eat Itself vs Gary Clail vs Ranking Roger vs the Mighty Diamonds vs the On U Sound System
- Blue Pearl (produced and mixed by Utah Saints)

==== Charts ====
Chart (1993–1994)	Peak position
Australian Singles Chart (ARIA Charts)	214
UK Singles Chart (OCC)	23
