= Saint of Me =

Single by the Rolling Stones

from the album Bridges to Babylon
- B-side: "Anyway You Look at It" (non-album track)
- Released: 26 January 1998
- Recorded: March – July 1997
- Genre: Rock
- Length: 4:11 (Radio edit); 5:15 (Album version)
- Label: Virgin
- Songwriter: Jagger/Richards
- Producers: Don Was, The Dust Brothers, The Glimmer Twins

The Rolling Stones singles chronology
"Anybody Seen My Baby?" (1997)	"Saint of Me" (1998)	"Out of Control" (1998)

Music video
- "Saint of Me" on YouTube

"Saint of Me" is a song by English rock band the Rolling Stones, released as the third single from their 21st British and 23rd American studio album, Bridges to Babylon (1997). It reached number 26 in the UK and number 94 in the US, where it also reached number 13 on Billboard's Mainstream Rock Tracks. To date, "Saint of Me" is the Rolling Stones' last original song to chart on the Billboard Hot 100. A recording from the Bridges to Babylon Tour can be found on the 1998 live album, No Security.

The B-side, "Anyway You Look at It", is a ballad and appears on the compilation Rarities 1971–2003, released in 2005.

== Recording and composition ==
The song is notable for its performers, with Mick Jagger on vocals, acoustic guitar and keyboards, Waddy Wachtel and Ron Wood on electric guitars (Keith Richards is notably absent), Me'Shell Ndegéocello and Pierre de Beauport on bass and six-string bass, respectively, and Billy Preston on organ. Lyrically, the song mentions various people in history who had converted to Christianity, notably St. Paul and St. Augustine; Jagger sings that they will never make a saint out of him.

== Critical reception ==
Alan Jones from Music Week viewed the song as "a fine latterday example of the group which only takes on a heavyweight quality in house mixes by Deep Dish, who retain enough of Jagger's vocals to distinguish it." He added, "With blistering Armand Van Helden mixes of the Stones' last single 'Anybody Seen My Baby?', this will likely augment the usual Stones audience with large numbers of dance fans, ensuring the oldest regularly-charting rock band in the world continue to pass chart muster."

== Track listing ==
1. "Saint of Me" (Radio edit) – 4:11
2. "Anyway You Look at It" – 4:30
3. "Gimme Shelter" (live) – 6:54
4. "Anybody Seen My Baby?" (Bonus Roll) – 5:59

== Personnel ==
Personnel adapted from CD liner notes

The Rolling Stones

- Mick Jagger – lead vocals, keyboards, acoustic guitar
- Ronnie Wood – guitar
- Charlie Watts – drums

Additional musicians

- Pierre de Beauport – bass six
- Blondie Chaplin – backing vocals
- Bernard Fowler – backing vocals
- Jamie Muhoberac – keyboards
- Me'Shell Ndegeocello – bass
- Billy Preston – organ
- Waddy Wachtel – guitar

== Charts ==
Chart performance for "Saint of Me"
Chart (1998)	Peak position
Australia (ARIA)	100
Austria (Ö3 Austria Top 40)	34
Germany (GfK)	68
Netherlands (Single Top 100)	52
UK Singles (OCC)	26
US Billboard Hot 100	94
US Adult Alternative Airplay (Billboard)	7
