= Michael Davis (trombonist) =

American jazz musician (born 1961)

- Born: August 13, 1961 (age 64) San Francisco, California, U.S.
- Origin: San Jose, California, U.S.
- Genres: Jazz
- Instruments: Trombone

Michael Davis (born August 13, 1961) is an American jazz trombonist from San Jose, California.

== Discography ==
=== As leader ===
- 1989 Sidewalk Cafe
- 1991 Heroes
- 1994 Midnight Crossing
- 1997 Absolute Trombone
- 1999 Bonetown
- 2000 Brass Nation
- 2002 New Brass
- 2003 Trumpets Eleven
- 2007 Absolute Trombone II
- 2015 Bone Alone
- 2016 Hip-Bone Big Band
- 2023 Open City

=== As sideman ===
With Linda Eder

- 1991 Linda Eder
- 1997 It's Time
- 2003 Broadway My Way

With Bob Mintzer

- 1990 The Art of the Big Band
- 1991 Departure
- 1993 Only in New York
- 2000 Homage to Count Basie
- 2003 Gently
- 2004 Live at MCG
- 2006 Old School New Lessons
- 2008 Swing Out
- 2012 For the Moment

With The Rolling Stones

- 1995 Stripped
- 1998 No Security
- 2008 Shine a Light

With Philippe Saisse

- 1995 Masques
- 1997 Next Voyage
- 1999 Halfway Till Dawn
- 2009 Philippe Saisse

With Andy Snitzer

- 1994 Ties That Bind
- 1996 In the Eye of the Storm
- 1999 Some Quiet Place
- 2013 The Rhythm

With others

- 1985 Mr. Drums, Buddy Rich
- 1989 Through the Storm, Aretha Franklin
- 1991 All of Me, John Pizzarelli
- 1993 Caché, Kirk Whalum
- 1994 Just for You, Gladys Knight
- 1994 Live from New York, Louie Bellson
- 1994 Picture Perfect Morning, Edie Brickell
- 1994 Push, Bill Evans
- 1995 I Wish It So, Dawn Upshaw
- 1996 Better Than Ever, Julius La Rosa
- 1996 I'll Be Your Baby Tonight, Bernadette Peters
- 1997 Que Pasa, Gato Barbieri
- 1997 Turning Night into Day, Nelson Rangell
- 1998 The Globe Sessions, Sheryl Crow
- 1999 Slowing Down the World, Chris Botti
- 2000 The Door, Keb' Mo'
- 2000 Universal Language, Marc Antoine
- 2001 Alternate Side, Tim Ries
- 2002 Outbreak, Dennis Chambers
- 2003 34th N Lex, Randy Brecker
- 2003 Smile, Lyle Lovett
- 2004 Taking a Chance on Love, Jane Monheit
- 2005 When I'm With You, Chuck Loeb
- 2007 This Is Somewhere, Grace Potter
- 2008 The Rolling Stones Project, Tim Ries
- 2014 No Sad Songs for Me, Carol Fredette
- 2015 Before This World, James Taylor
- 2015 The Hope of Christmas, Ann Hampton Callaway
