= No Security =

Live album by the Rolling Stones
- Released: 2 November 1998
- Recorded: 25 October 1997; 12 December 1997; 4 April 1998; 13 June 1998; 1, 5–6 July 1998
- Genre: Rock
- Length: 67:50
- Label: Virgin
- Producer: The Glimmer Twins

The Rolling Stones chronology
Bridges to Babylon (1997)	No Security (1998)	Forty Licks (2002)

Charlie Watts discussing No Security in 1998

Professional ratings
Review scores
Source	Rating
AllMusic	2.5/5 stars
Rolling Stone	4/5 stars

No Security is a live album by the Rolling Stones released by Virgin Records in 1998. Recorded over the course of the band's 1997–1998 worldwide Bridges to Babylon Tour, it was the band's eighth official full-length live release.

Not wishing to repeat songs from previous live albums Still Life (1982), Flashpoint (1991) and Stripped (1995), the Rolling Stones for the most part chose songs that had never been on a live release, including four from the band's most-recent studio album Bridges to Babylon (1997). Taj Mahal and Dave Matthews appeared as special guests. The tracks were taken from live performances at the Amsterdam Arena, Capitol Theatre (Port Chester, New York) (for MTV's Live from the 10 Spot), TWA Dome (St. Louis), River Plate Stadium (Buenos Aires), and Zeppelinfeld (Nuremberg).

The album was released in November 1998, and the band thereafter embarked on another tour, the No Security Tour, crossing North America for 34 shows in hockey and basketball arenas.

The front cover photo was taken at a show in Wiener Neustadt, Austria, on 11 July 1998. The man was identified as Wolfgang Dusek, an optician from Vienna. The woman is Birgit Lötsch, a tattoo and piercing artist. They were not a couple, just randomly picked out from the crowd, and reportedly got paid 500 dollars each for the picture.

No Security peaked at number 67 on the UK Albums Chart, and at number 34 on the US Billboard 200. It failed to achieve US gold record status, selling more than 300,000 copies. The album was not reissued by UMe when Universal reissued the 1971–2005 back catalog.

== Track listing ==
All tracks are written by Mick Jagger and Keith Richards, with additional writers noted.

No Security track listing
No.	Title	Writer(s)	Length
1.	"Intro"		0:50
2.	"You Got Me Rocking" (Amsterdam Arena, 6 July 1998)		3:26
3.	"Gimme Shelter" (Capitol Theatre, 25 October 1997)		6:22
4.	"Flip the Switch" (Amsterdam Arena, 1 July 1998)		4:12
5.	"Memory Motel" (Amsterdam Arena, 5 July 1998)		6:05
6.	"Corrina" (TWA Dome, 12 December 1997)	Taj Mahal; Jesse Ed Davis	4:17
7.	"Saint of Me" (River Plate Stadium, 4 April 1998)		5:25
8.	"Waiting on a Friend" (TWA Dome, 12 December 1997)		5:02
9.	"Sister Morphine" (Amsterdam Arena, 6 July 1998)	Jagger; Richards; Marianne Faithfull	6:16
10.	"Live with Me" (Amsterdam Arena, 1 July 1998)		3:54
11.	"Respectable" (Amsterdam Arena, 5 July 1998)		3:35
12.	"Thief in the Night" (Zeppelinfeld, 13 June 1998)	Jagger; Richards; Pierre de Beauport	5:37
13.	"The Last Time" (TWA Dome, 12 December 1997)		5:37
14.	"Out of Control" (River Plate Stadium, 4 April 1998)		7:59
Total length:			67:50

Japanese bonus track
No.	Title	Writer(s)	Length
12.	"I Just Want to Make Love to You" (Amsterdam Arena, 1 July 1998)	Willie Dixon	5:19

== Personnel ==
The Rolling Stones

- Mick Jagger – lead vocals, harmonica, and guitar
- Keith Richards – guitar and vocals
- Ronnie Wood – electric and lap slide guitar
- Charlie Watts – drums

Additional musicians

- Darryl Jones – bass guitar, backing vocals
- Chuck Leavell – keyboards, backing vocals
- Pierre de Beauport – Wurlitzer electric piano on "Thief in the Night"
- Bobby Keys – saxophone
- Andy Snitzer – saxophone, keyboards
- Kent Smith – trumpet
- Michael Davis – trombone
- Bernard Fowler – backing vocals, percussion
- Lisa Fischer – backing vocals
- Blondie Chaplin – backing vocals, percussion
- Leah Wood – backing vocals on "Thief in the Night"
- Johnny Starbuck – shaker on "Out of Control"

Special guests

- Dave Matthews – vocals on "Memory Motel"
- Taj Mahal – vocals on "Corinna"
- Joshua Redman – saxophone on "Waiting on a Friend"

Recording credits River Plate Stadium Buenos Aires, 4 April 1998

- Engineering – Ed Cherney and David Hewitt at Remote Recording Services

== Charts ==
Chart performance for No Security
Chart (1998)	Peak position
Austrian Albums (Ö3 Austria)	12
Belgian Albums (Ultratop Flanders)	36
Dutch Albums (Album Top 100)	15
French Albums (SNEP)	7
German Albums (Offizielle Top 100)	5
Japanese Albums (Oricon)	14
Norwegian Albums (VG-lista)	19
Swedish Albums (Sverigetopplistan)	22
Swiss Albums (Schweizer Hitparade)	29
UK Albums (Official Charts)	67
US Billboard 200	34
