= Bobby Keys =

American saxophonist (1943–2014)

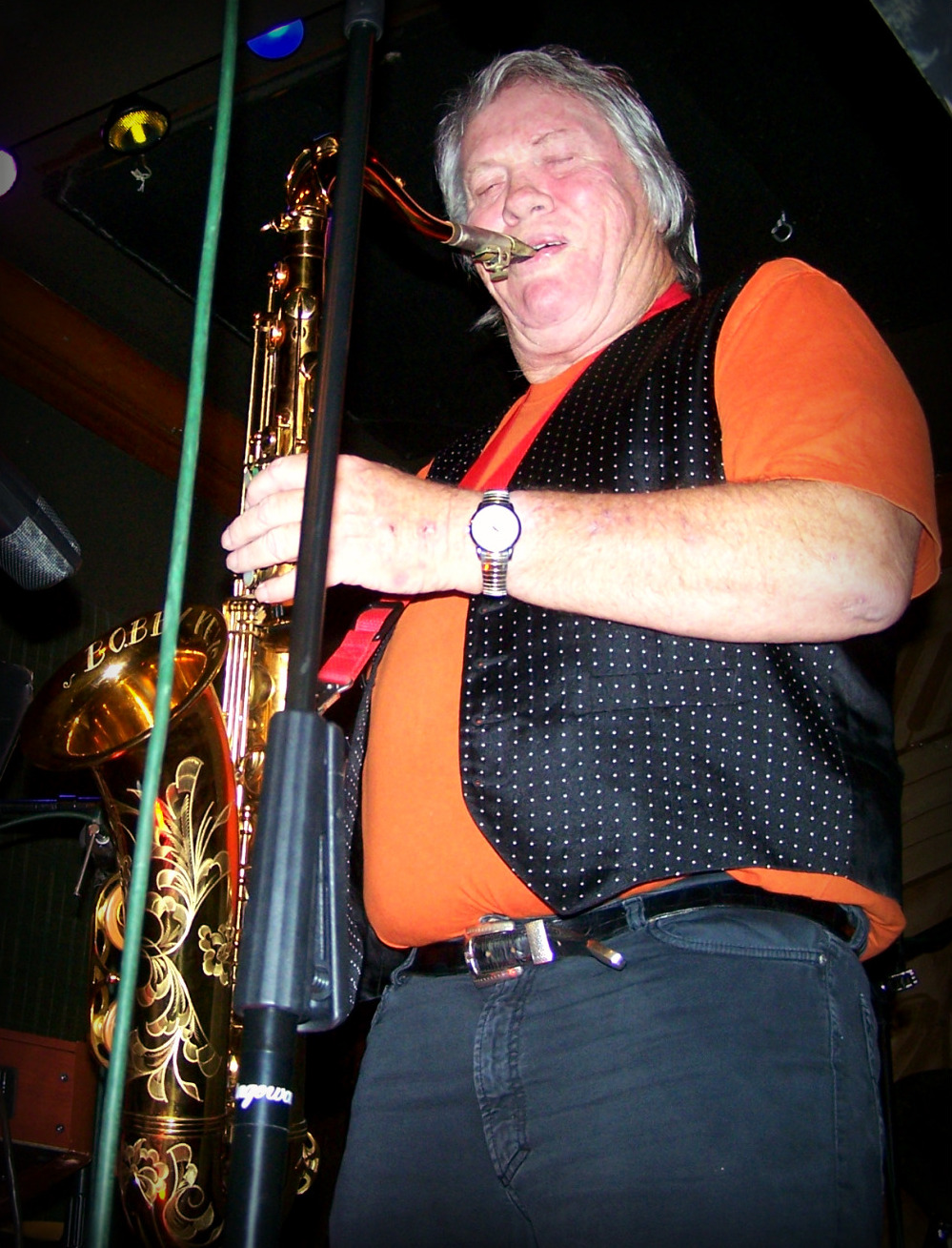
- Keys performing in October 2009

Background information
- Born: December 18, 1943; Slaton, Texas, U.S.
- Died: December 2, 2014 (aged 70) Franklin, Tennessee, U.S.
- Genres: Rock; jazz
- Occupation: Session musician
- Instrument: Saxophone
- Years active: 1956–2014
- Formerly of: Delaney & Bonnie; Plastic Ono Band

Robert Henry Keys (December 18, 1943 – December 2, 2014) was an American saxophonist who performed as a member of several horn sections of the 1970s. He appears on albums by the Rolling Stones, Lynyrd Skynyrd, Harry Nilsson, Delaney & Bonnie and Friends, George Harrison, John Lennon, Ringo Starr, Eric Clapton, Joe Cocker, Joe Ely, and other prominent musicians. Keys played on hundreds of recordings, and was a touring musician from 1956 until his death in 2014.

== Early life ==
Keys was born at Lubbock Army Airfield near Slaton, Texas, where his father, Bill Keys, was in the U.S. Army Air Corps. His mother, Lucy, was 16 when she gave birth to Bobby, her first child. By 1946, Bill Keys got a job for the Santa Fe Railroad in Belen, New Mexico. The family moved to Belen, but young Robert stayed with his grandparents in Slaton, Texas, an arrangement he was quite happy with. Bill and Lucy would have three more children, Gary and twins Debbie and Daryl. Lucy Keys Brubaker went on to become a state senator in New Mexico.

== Career ==
Keys started touring at age fifteen with fellow Texan Buddy Knox. He reportedly played the saxophone on Elvis Presley's 1962 version of "Return to Sender". Keys also stated that he "befriended Buddy Holly, playing with him briefly as a teenager. I kind of weaseled my way into the perimeter of the garage," recalled Keys. "He was the first guy I heard play electric guitar and it impressed the hell out of me."

Keys met the Rolling Stones at the San Antonio Teen Fair while sharing a bill with the group as a member of Bobby Vee's band in 1964. After renewing his acquaintance with the band via Gram Parsons, a mutual friend, Keys made his debut with the Rolling Stones on the Let It Bleed track "Live with Me" in 1969. Keys’ impressive resume as a musician includes his tenor saxophone solo on the 1971 Rolling Stones hit “Brown Sugar". His friendship with Keith Richards was well-known. They were born on the same day. Notably, Keys and Richards threw a television set from the 10th floor of the Continental Hyatt House in West Hollywood, California, during the group's 1972 American tour, as seen in the Stones' unreleased 1972 concert movie Cocksucker Blues. In addition to "Brown Sugar", he was prominently featured on such early 1970s Stones songs as "Can't You Hear Me Knocking", "Rip This Joint" and "Sweet Virginia".

Keys and Mick Jagger also became close in the early 1970s, with Keys serving as best man at Jagger's wedding. Together with Jim Price on trumpet, Keys toured with the Stones from 1970 to 1973. Along with trumpeter Steve Madaio and fellow saxophonist Trevor Lawrence, Keys continued as a touring member for the first half of the 1973 European tour before leaving in Frankfurt, Germany, on September 30. According to legend, Keys was abruptly dismissed by an incensed Jagger after filling a bathtub with Dom Perignon champagne (resulting in a debt to the band that significantly exceeded his entire salary for the tour) and drinking most of it. Although Keys did not dispute the veracity of the incident, he subsequently maintained in his memoir that he left the tour of his own volition to curtail his heroin addiction for the sake of his family. As a result of his strained relationship with Jagger, Keys only guested on some shows of the 1975 and 1978 American tours, missing the 1976 European tour completely.

Richards recalled Keys overcoming Jagger's objections to returning to the band:

Years later, the Stones were rehearsing for another tour. This was 1980-something, and I bought Bobby a ticket and said, "Just get your ass here. When we rehearse "Brown Sugar", just sneak up and do the solo, man." Once we did "Brown Sugar," Bobby hit the solo and then I looked at Mick like, "You see what I mean, Mick?" And Mick looked at me and says, "Yeah, you can't argue with that." Once he just played those few notes, there really was no question. So Mick relented and said, "Okay, let's get Bob back in the band."

Keys shared saxophone duties with Ernie Watts on the 1981 tour, performing on a total of 10 songs out of a 23 song set. Keys was reinstated as the band's main touring saxophonist on the 1982 European Tour, together with Gene Barge. Keys played with the Stones on all subsequent tours up to his death.

Prior to touring with the Stones, Keys played with Delaney & Bonnie and Friends with Eric Clapton and George Harrison in 1969. In particular, during the year 1970 he gave a series of notable performances. Keys started the year working on Clapton's debut solo album, Eric Clapton (1970). With Leon Russell, he supported Joe Cocker on the 48-city Mad Dogs & Englishmen tour; the live album Mad Dogs & Englishmen was released later in the year, followed by a concert movie in 1971. During the tour, Cocker and the band were accompanied by a largely American entourage almost 40 strong, including a choir, friends, wives, children, groupies and a single dog named Canina. After work on George Harrison's All Things Must Pass and more Sticky Fingers tracks, he joined the Rolling Stones for their fall 1970 European tour.

From 1973 to 1975, Keys participated in Lennon's "Lost Weekend" in Los Angeles along with Ringo Starr, Harry Nilsson and Keith Moon; while in Los Angeles, he played on Lennon's albums Walls and Bridges (including a notable solo on the #1 American hit "Whatever Gets You thru the Night") and Rock 'n' Roll. Although Keys' voice is heard on the last known recording session between Paul McCartney and Lennon (widely bootlegged as A Toot and a Snore in '74), he could not recall contributing to the session. He also played the solo on Leo Sayer's 1977 international soft rock hit "When I Need You" from the Endless Flight album.

In 1979, Keys was part of a Rolling Stones spin-off band called The New Barbarians (which also included Ronnie Wood & Keith Richards) that played two concerts in Canada and eighteen shows across the United States in April and May 1979.

In 1989, Keys became the musical director for Wood's new Miami club, Woody's on the Beach. The first week the club opened Keys booked Jerry Lee Lewis, Fats Domino and the Crickets. In the early 1990s Keys was a resident of Miami and had a band with former Stones guitarist Mick Taylor, Nicky Hopkins, Ivan Neville, former Stephen Stills bassist Calvin "Fuzzy" Samuels and others called Tumbling Dice. Although better known as a session musician, Keys released two albums of his own in the 1970s: a self-titled instrumental album on Warner Bros. Records that featured Ringo Starr, George Harrison and Eric Clapton in 1972; and Gimme the Key on Ringo Starr's record label Ring O'Records in 1975.

In 2013 he played with the Rolling Stones at their Glastonbury Festival debut, headlining on June 29. Keys played on their 14 On Fire tour with Roskilde Festival in Denmark being his last concert performance for the Stones.

== Personal life and death ==
Keys was married to Holly Keys. Their children are Amber, Huck, and Jesse Keys, and Keys' step-son Randy Kaune.

Keys died of liver cancer in hospice care at his home in Franklin, Tennessee, on December 2, 2014.

== Selected discography ==
An eponymous solo album was released by Warner Bros. in 1972. He also appears on:

- The Rolling Stones: Let It Bleed, Sticky Fingers, Let It Rock EP (UK), Exile on Main St., Goats Head Soup, Emotional Rescue, Flashpoint, Stripped, No Security, Shine a Light, Live Licks, Sweet Summer Sun, Ladies & Gentleman: The Rolling Stones, No Security San Jose '99, Voodoo Lounge Uncut, Bridges to Bremen, Bridges to Buenos Aires, Steel Wheels Live, A Bigger Bang Live on Copacabana Beach, Licked Live in NYC, Grrr Live!, Live at the Wiltern, Welcome to Shepherd's Bush
- Joe Cocker: Mad Dogs & Englishmen
- George Harrison: All Things Must Pass
- John Lennon: Some Time in New York City, Walls and Bridges, Rock 'n' Roll
- Keith Richards: Talk Is Cheap, Live at the Hollywood Palladium
- Ringo Starr: Ringo, Goodnight Vienna
- Ronnie Wood: 1234, Gimme Some Neck, Mahoney's Last Stand
- B.B. King: B.B. King in London
- Audience: Lunch
- Barbra Streisand: Barbra Joan Streisand
- Carly Simon: No Secrets, Hotcakes
- Chuck Berry: Hail! Hail! Rock 'n' Roll
- Delaney, Bonnie & Friends: The Original Delaney & Bonnie & Friends, On Tour with Eric Clapton
- Donovan: Cosmic Wheels
- Dr. John: The Sun, Moon & Herbs
- Eric Clapton: Eric Clapton
- Faces: Long Player
- Harry Nilsson: Nilsson Schmilsson, Son of Schmilsson, Pussy Cats, Duit on Mon Dei
- Warren Zevon: Warren Zevon
- Humble Pie: Rock On
- Joe Ely: Lord of the Highway, LIVE Chicago 1987!
- John Hiatt: Beneath This Gruff Exterior
- John Martyn: Inside Out
- Kate & Anna McGarrigle: Kate & Anna McGarrigle
- Keith Moon: Two Sides of the Moon
- Leo Sayer: Endless Flight
- Lynyrd Skynyrd: Second Helping
- John Lennon and Paul McCartney: A Toot and a Snore in '74
- John Lennon: Whatever Gets You thru the Night
- Marvin Gaye: Let's Get It On (deluxe edition)
- Sheryl Crow: The Globe Sessions
- Yoko Ono: Fly
- Jim Carroll: Catholic Boy
- Graham Nash: Songs for Beginners
- Carl Carlton & The Songdogs: Love & Respect, Cahoots & Roots - Live From Planet Zod
