= Charlie Watts =

British drummer (1941–2021)

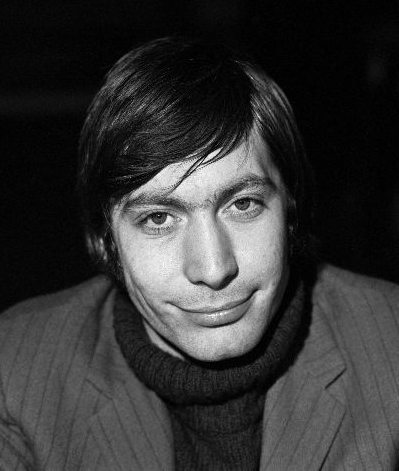
- Watts in 1965
- Born: Charles Robert Watts; 2 June 1941; Bloomsbury, London, England
- Died: 24 August 2021 (aged 80); Chelsea, London, England
- Occupation: Drummer
- Years active: 1958–2021
- Spouse: Shirley Shepherd (m. 1964)
- Children: 1
- Musical career
- Genres: Rock; jazz; blues
- Labels: Decca; Rolling Stones; Virgin
- Formerly of: The Rolling Stones; Blues Incorporated; Rocket 88

Charles Robert Watts (2 June 1941 – 24 August 2021) was an English musician who was the drummer of the Rolling Stones from 1963 until his death in 2021.

Originally trained as a graphic artist, Watts developed an interest in jazz at a young age and joined the band Blues Incorporated. He also started playing drums in London's rhythm and blues clubs, where he met future bandmates Mick Jagger, Keith Richards and Brian Jones. In January 1963, he left Blues Incorporated and joined the Rolling Stones as drummer, while doubling as designer of their record sleeves and tour stages. Watts's first public appearance as a permanent member was in February 1963; he remained with the band for 58 years until his death.

Nicknamed "the Wembley Whammer" by Jagger, Watts cited jazz as a major influence on his drumming style. Aside from his career with the Rolling Stones, Watts toured with his own group, the Charlie Watts Quintet, and appeared in London at Ronnie Scott's Jazz Club with the Charlie Watts Tentet.

In 1989, Watts was inducted into the Rock and Roll Hall of Fame with the Rolling Stones, and in 2004, he was inducted into the UK Music Hall of Fame, also with the Rolling Stones. He has been ranked among the greatest drummers of all time.

== Early life ==
Charles Robert Watts was born on 2 June 1941 at University College Hospital in Bloomsbury, London, to Charles Richard Watts, a lorry driver for the London, Midland and Scottish Railway, and wife Lillian Charlotte (née Eaves), who had been a factory worker. He had a sister, Linda (born 1944), with whom he was close.

As a child, Watts lived in Wembley, at 23 Pilgrims Way. Many of Wembley's houses had been destroyed by Luftwaffe bombs during World War II; Watts and his family lived in a prefab, as did many in the community. Watts would remember little of the Second World War, stating "I heard bombs exploding in the neighbourhood. I remember the mad rush from the house into the air-raid shelters. I was very young. War was something of a game to me – I don't think I ever really and truly got frightened."

In 1946, Watts met neighbour Dave Green, who had moved next door at 22 Pilgrims Way; they became childhood friends, and remained so until Watts's death. Green became a jazz bass player, and recalls that as boys, "we discovered 78rpm records. Charlie had more records than I did ... We used to go to Charlie's bedroom and just get these records out." Watts's earliest records were jazz recordings; he remembered owning 78 RPM records of Jelly Roll Morton and Charlie Parker. Green recalls that Watts also "had the one with Monk and the Johnny Dodds Trio. Charlie was ahead of me in listening and acquisitions." Green and Watts would become bandmates in many of Charlie's jazz projects.

Watts and his family subsequently moved to Kingsbury, where he attended Tylers Croft Secondary Modern School from 1952 to 1956; as a schoolboy, he displayed a talent for art, music, cricket and football. When he and Green were both about thirteen, Watts became interested in drumming:

I bought a banjo, and I didn't like the dots on the neck. So I took the neck off, and at the same time I heard a drummer called Chico Hamilton, who played with Gerry Mulligan, and I wanted to play like that, with brushes. I didn't have a snare drum, so I put the banjo head on a stand.

In 1955, Watts received a £12 drum kit for Christmas, and he practised drumming along to jazz records he collected. After completing secondary school, Watts enrolled at Harrow Art School (now the Harrow campus of the University of Westminster), which he attended until 1960.

== Career ==
=== Jazz bands and Blues Incorporated ===
After leaving art school, he worked as a graphic designer for an advertising company called Charlie Daniels Studios, and also played drums occasionally with local bands in coffee shops and clubs. He and Green began their musical careers together from 1958 to 1959, playing in a jazz band in Middlesex called the Jo Jones All Stars. Watts initially found his transition to rhythm and blues puzzling: "I went into rhythm and blues. When they asked me to play, I didn't know what it was. I thought it meant Charlie Parker, played slow."

In 1961, Watts met Alexis Korner, who invited him to join his band Blues Incorporated. At that time, Watts was on his way to a sojourn working as a graphic designer in Denmark, but he accepted Korner's offer when he returned to London in February 1962. Watts played regularly with Blues Incorporated and maintained a job with the advertising firm Charles, Hobson and Gray.

=== Career with the Rolling Stones ===
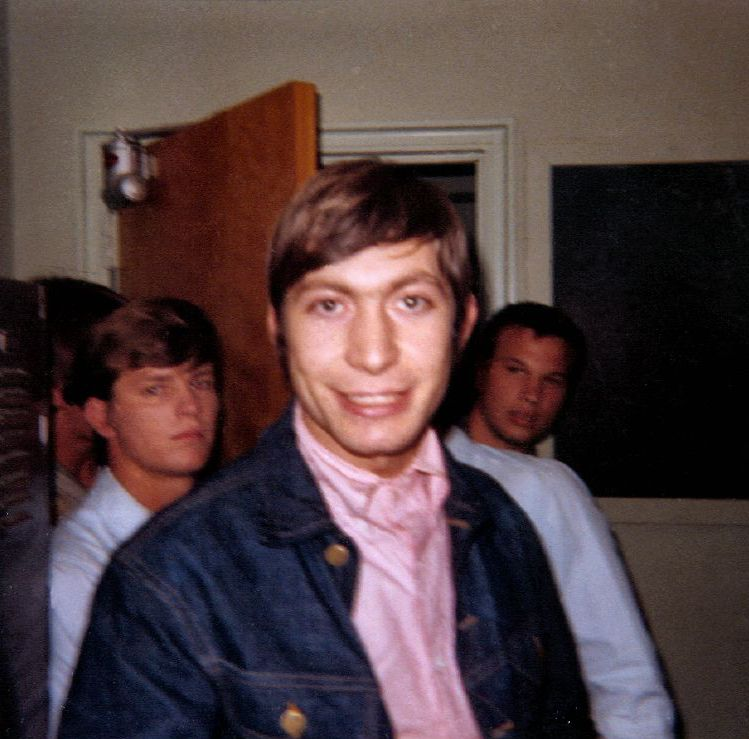
Watts backstage during a Rolling Stones tour on 4 May 1965

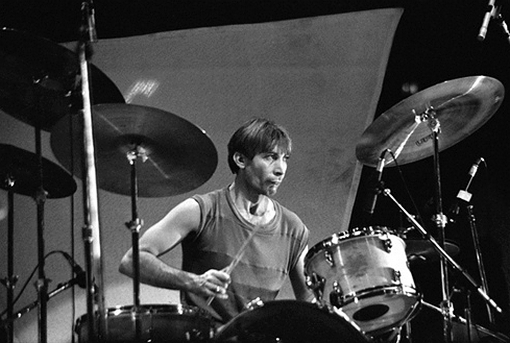
Watts performing with the Rolling Stones in 1981

Watts discussing No Security in 1998

In mid-1962, Watts first met Brian Jones, Ian "Stu" Stewart, Mick Jagger and Keith Richards, who also frequented the London rhythm and blues clubs, but it was not until January 1963 that Watts finally agreed to join the Rolling Stones. Initially, the band could not afford to pay Watts, who had been earning a regular salary from his gigs. His first public appearance as a permanent member was at the Ealing Jazz Club on 2 February 1963. Watts was often introduced as "The Wembley Whammer" by Jagger during live concerts.

Besides his work as a musician, Watts contributed graphic art and comic strips to early Rolling Stones records such as the Between the Buttons record sleeve, and was responsible for the 1975 tour announcement press conference in New York City. The band surprised the throng of waiting reporters by driving and playing "Brown Sugar" on the back of a flatbed truck in the middle of Manhattan traffic. Watts remembered this was a common way for New Orleans jazz bands to promote upcoming dates. Moreover, with Jagger, he designed the elaborate stages for tours, first contributing to the lotus-shaped design of the Tour of the Americas, as well as the Steel Wheels/Urban Jungle Tour, the Bridges to Babylon Tour, the Licks Tour, and the A Bigger Bang Tour.

Watts's last live concert with the band was 30 August 2019 at Hard Rock Stadium in Miami, Florida. He had never missed a single concert throughout his career with the band. Besides Jagger and Richards, he is the only member to have appeared on every album in the Rolling Stones discography.

In October 2023, two years after Watts's death, the Rolling Stones released Hackney Diamonds. The album features two songs on which Watts plays the drums: "Mess It Up" and "Live By The Sword".

=== Activities outside the Stones ===
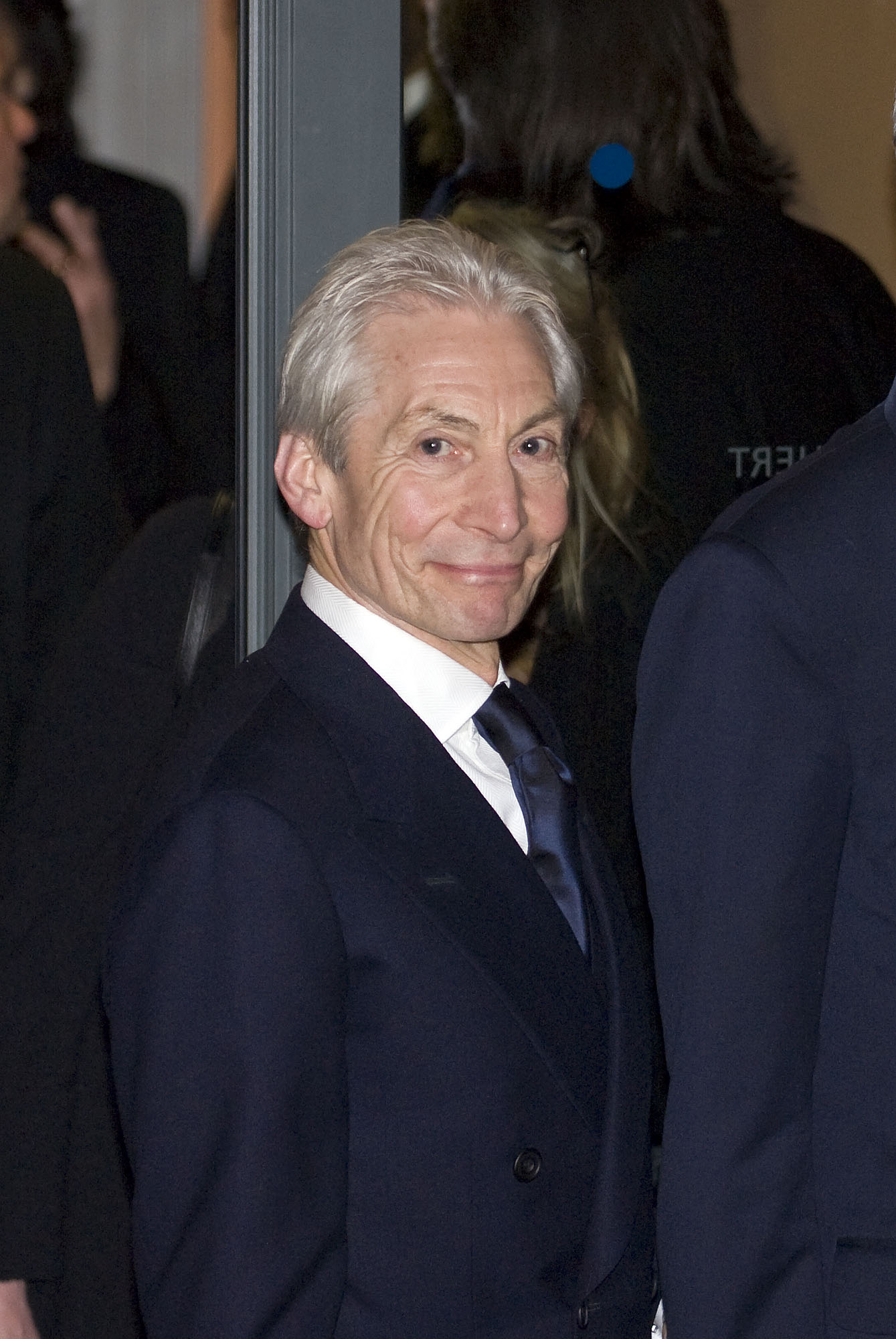
Watts in 2008

Watts was involved in many activities outside his life as a member of the Rolling Stones. In December 1964, he published a cartoon tribute to Charlie Parker titled Ode to a High Flying Bird. Although he made his name in rock, his personal tastes lay principally in jazz.

In the late 1970s, he joined Ian Stewart in the back-to-the-roots boogie-woogie band Rocket 88, which featured many of the UK's top jazz, rock and R&B musicians. In the 1980s, he toured worldwide with a big band – the Charlie Watts Orchestra – that included such names as Evan Parker, Courtney Pine and Jack Bruce, who was also a member of Rocket 88.

In 1991, he organised a jazz quintet as another tribute to Charlie Parker. The year 1993 saw the release of Warm and Tender by the Charlie Watts Quintet, which included vocalist Bernard Fowler. This same group released Long Ago and Far Away in 1996. Both records included a collection of Great American Songbook standards. Following their collaboration on the Rolling Stones' 1997 album Bridges to Babylon, he and drummer Jim Keltner released a techno/instrumental album titled Charlie Watts/Jim Keltner Project. Watts stated that even though the tracks bore such names as the "Elvin Suite" in honour of the late Elvin Jones, Max Roach and Roy Haynes, they were not copying their style of drumming, but rather capturing a feeling by those artists. Watts at Scott's was recorded with his group, "the Charlie Watts Tentet", at the Ronnie Scott's Jazz Club in London.

In April 2009, he began performing with the ABC&D of Boogie Woogie. When asked by pianist Ben Waters to join the ensemble, he quickly agreed; his only demand being that Dave Green play bass, stating, "If Dave does it, I'll do it."

== Personal life and public image ==
On 14 October 1964, Watts married Shirley Ann Shepherd (11 September 1938 – 16 December 2022), whom he had met before joining the Stones in 1963. The couple had one daughter, Seraphina, born in March 1968, who in turn gave birth to Watts's only grandchild, a girl named Charlotte. Watts and Shirley were married for 57 years, until Watts's death in 2021.

Watts lived at Halsdon House near Dolton, a rural village in North Devon, where he owned an Arabian horse stud farm. He also owned a percentage of the Rolling Stones' various corporate entities.

While all the Rolling Stones collected cars, Watts never had a driving licence, preferring to view his cars as beautiful objects. Watts was also a fan of cricket, and had a collection of cricket memorabilia.

=== Touring and band relationships ===
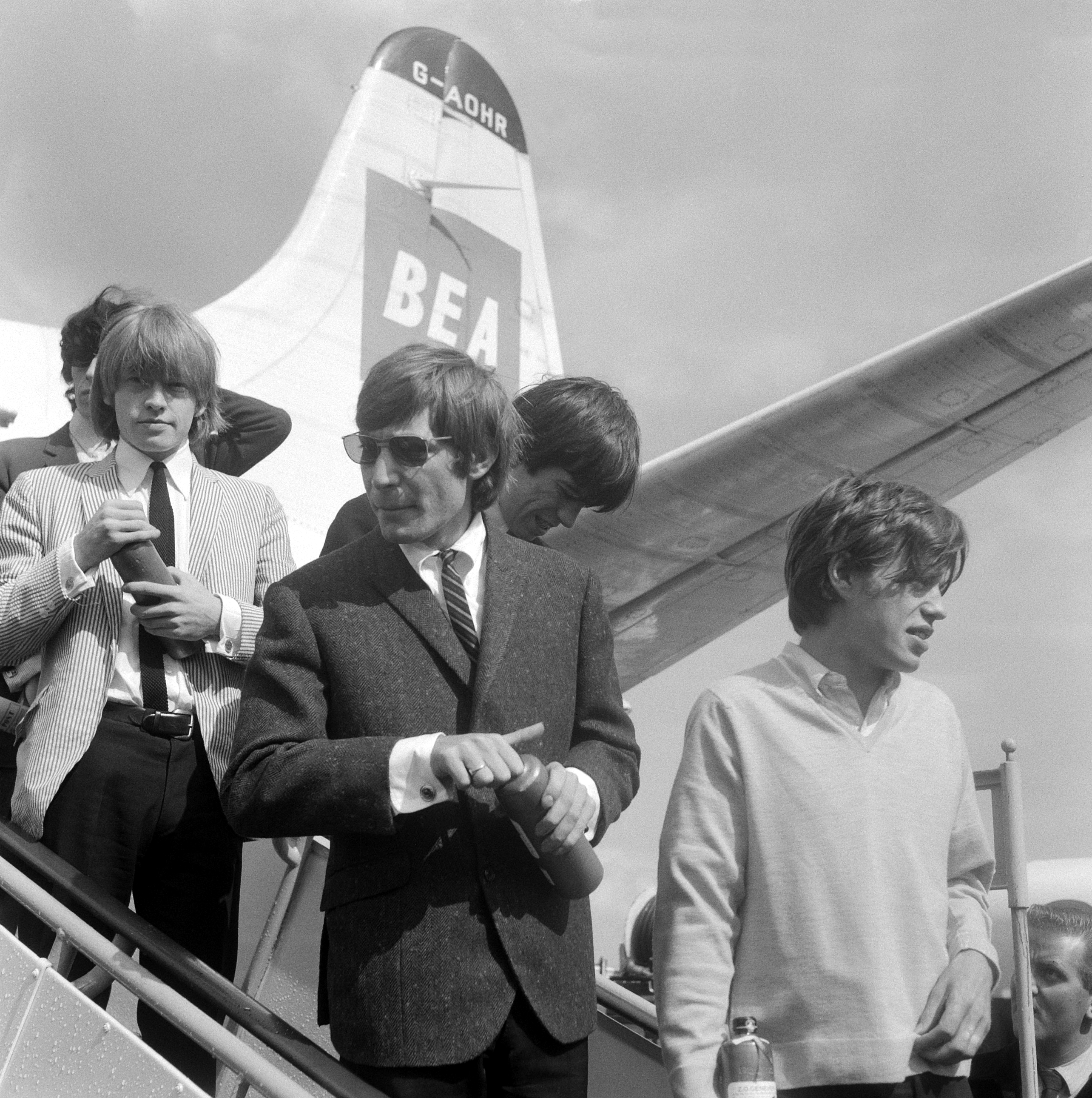
Watts (centre) with the Rolling Stones in Amsterdam, 1964

Watts expressed a love–hate attitude towards touring, stating in 2003 that he "loved playing with Keith [Richards] and the band" but "wasn't interested in being a pop idol sitting there with girls screaming". He left the band after every tour, once stating "I don't actually like touring", citing the time commitment and travel required. In 1989, when the Rolling Stones were inducted into the Rock and Roll Hall of Fame, Watts did not attend the ceremony.

Watts's personal life appeared to be substantially quieter than those of his bandmates and many of his rock-and-roll colleagues; onstage, he seemed to furnish a calm and amused counterpoint to his flamboyant bandmates. Known for his loyalty to Shirley, Watts consistently refused sexual offers from groupies on the road; in Robert Greenfield's STP: A Journey Through America with The Rolling Stones, a documentary of the 1972 American Tour, it is noted that when the group was invited to the Playboy Mansion during that tour, Watts took advantage of Hugh Hefner's game room instead of frolicking with the women. "I've never filled the stereotype of the rock star", he remarked. "Back in the '70s, Bill Wyman and I decided to grow beards, and the effort left us exhausted." In a 1996 interview with Rolling Stone magazine, he said that he had sketched every bed he had slept on while on tour since 1967. By 2001, he had filled 12 to 15 diaries.

One anecdote relates that in the mid-1980s, an intoxicated Jagger phoned Watts's hotel room in the middle of the night, asking, "Where's my drummer?" Watts reportedly got up, shaved, dressed in a suit, put on a tie and freshly shined shoes, descended the stairs, and punched Jagger in the face, saying: "Never call me your drummer again. You're my fucking singer!" Watts expressed regret for the incident in 2003, attributing his behaviour to alcohol.

=== Health ===
In the mid-1980s, Watts's previously moderate use of alcohol and drugs became excessive. "[They were] my way of dealing with [family problems] ..." he said. "I think it was a mid-life crisis. All I know is that I became totally another person around 1983 and came out of it about 1986. I nearly lost my wife and everything over my behaviour."

Despite quitting smoking in the late 1980s, Watts was diagnosed with throat cancer in June 2004. He underwent a course of radiotherapy and the cancer went into remission. "I went into hospital," Watts recalled, "and eight months later Mick said, 'We're going to do a record. But we'll only do it when you're ready.' They were buggering about, writing songs, and when I was ready I went down and that was it, A Bigger Bang. Then I did a two-year tour. It seems that whenever we stop, I get ill. So maybe I should carry on!"

On 5 August 2021, it was reported that Watts had elected to sit out the resumption of the U.S. No Filter Tour due to heart surgery and that Steve Jordan would temporarily replace him on drums.

=== Death and tributes ===
On 24 August 2021, Watts died from squamous-cell carcinoma at the Royal Brompton Hospital in Chelsea, London, at the age of 80, with his family around him.

Watts's former bandmates Jagger, Richards, Wood and Wyman, all paid tribute to him. Many other celebrities and rock musicians paid tribute to Watts on his death, including Paul McCartney, Ringo Starr, Elton John, Brian Wilson, Pete Townshend, Nick Mason, Roger Daltrey, the members of U2, Bryan Adams, Liam Gallagher, Brian May, Roger Taylor, Kenney Jones, Chad Smith, Questlove, Peter Criss, and Max Weinberg. For 10 days, the contents of the Rolling Stones' official website were replaced with a single picture of Watts in his memory.

Two days after his death, Jason Isbell and Brittney Spencer dedicated a cover performance of "Gimme Shelter" to Watts. On 27 August, the band's social media accounts shared a video tribute to Watts consisting of a montage of pictures and film footage. The montage was set to the Rolling Stones' 1974 track "If You Can't Rock Me", which opens with the lines "The band's on stage and it's one of those nights ... / The drummer thinks that he is dynamite, oh yeah". Watts was buried in Devon after a small ceremony. An authorised biography was released in October 2022.

On the first anniversary of Watts's death, Jagger shared what Rolling Stone described as a "moving tribute" on social media, which included a voiceover by Jagger backed with "Till the Next Goodbye". To commemorate what would have been his 82nd birthday, Watts's estate launched official Facebook and Instagram accounts on 2 June 2023, saying in a statement that "Charlie was too modest to embrace social media in his lifetime" and encouraging fans to "celebrate his huge musical contribution to the world of rock 'n' roll, blues and jazz, and the wonderful man known and loved to the millions of fans around the world". In September 2023 his private book collection was set to be put up for auction; his signed first edition of The Great Gatsby was expected to fetch between £200,000–300,000. In January 2024, the Bayeux Museum in France announced that it had paid £16,000 to acquire a lifesize replica of the Bayeux Tapestry from Watts's estate.

== Equipment and style ==
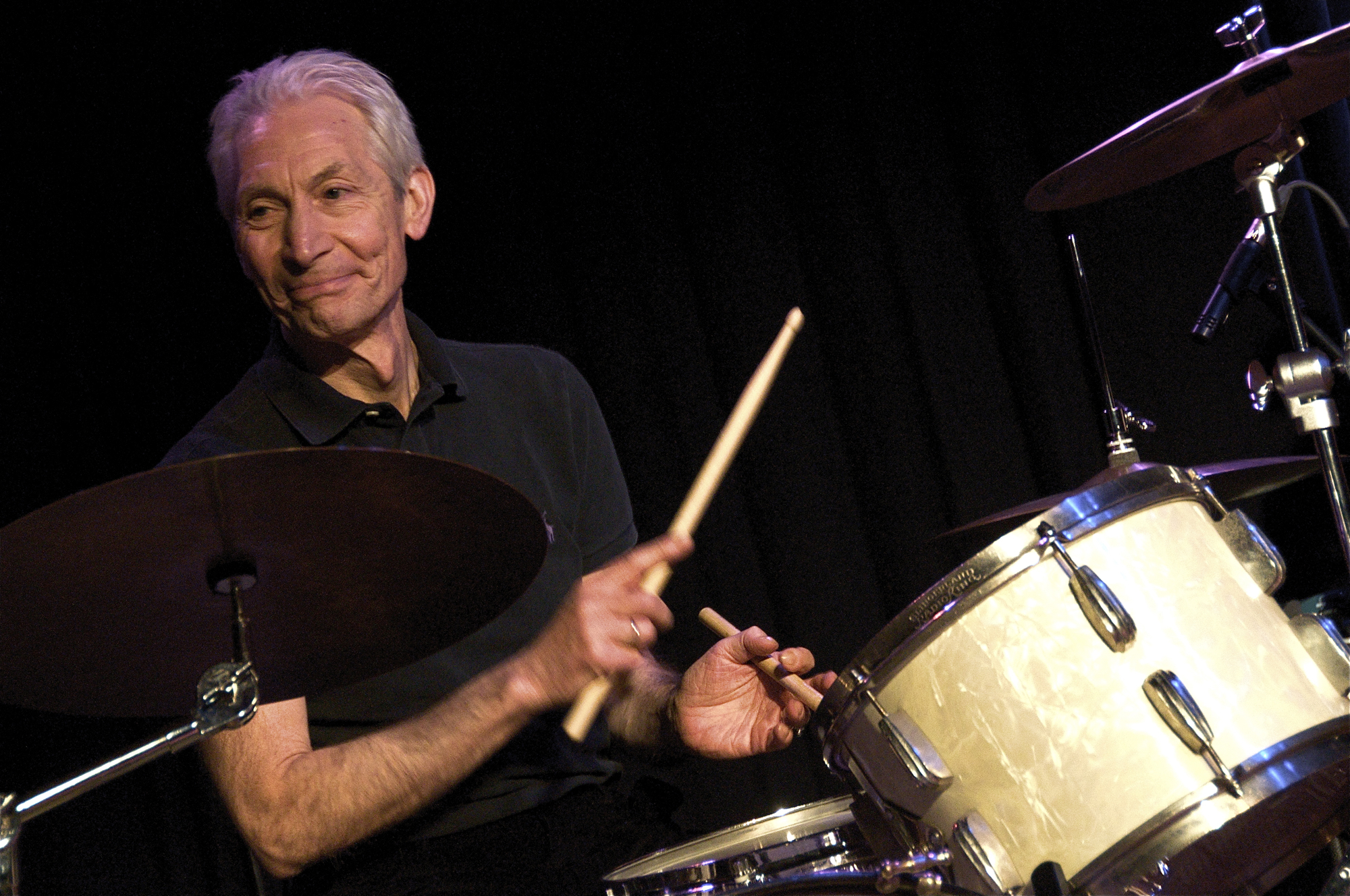
Watts performing in Herisau, Switzerland, January 2010

In the 1960s Watts used Ludwig drum sets until he switched to a Gretsch Round-Badge-Set in Black Nitron finish in 1968. From 1978 he played a late 1950's Gretsch Round Badge Natural Maple Kit, in a configuration consisting of a 22" × 14" bass drum, a hanging 12" × 8" rack tom which he positioned separately on a stand, a 16" × 16" floor tom, snare drum, hi-hat, and four cymbals.

Watts was known for his restrained, highly song-oriented style. He was not interested in drawing attention to himself with solos. Starting around 1969, he began omitting the backbeat (beats 2 and 4, in a measure of music) hi-hat cymbal eighth notes, in the typical, eighth-note based rock patterns, rather than playing them straight through as was customary. This technique allowed the backbeat (played on two and four, on the snare drum) more prominence, while also reducing his physical workload. Another characteristic of his playing from around 1968 to the mid-1970s was that he often delayed the snare drum on the second and fourth beats slightly (“late backbeat”), as heard in songs like "Monkey Man", "Wild Horses", "Sister Morphine", and "Let It Bleed". He often did not maintain a constant tempo but significantly accelerated over the course of a song (especially in "Honky Tonk Women"). From the mid-1970s, both of these details decreased in his studio recordings, though they remained noticeable in live performances.

== Accolades ==
In 1991, The Guardian described Watts as an "heroic yet quaint archetype ... of the 'Rock Drummer', and we are unlikely to hear their like again". The Guardian attributed his professional survival to not ever aspiring for stardom nor forcing himself into songwriting.

In the July 2006 issue of Modern Drummer magazine, Watts was voted into the Modern Drummer Hall of Fame, joining Ringo Starr, Keith Moon, Steve Gadd, Buddy Rich and other highly esteemed and influential drummers from the history of rock and jazz. The music critic Robert Christgau called Watts "rock's greatest drummer". Unlike in most bands where the other musicians follow the lead of the drummer, Watts followed Richards; according to New York Times critic Michiko Kakutani, that is what "makes the Stones impossible to copy".

He is often regarded as one of the greatest drummers of all time. In 2016, he was ranked 12th on Rolling Stone's "100 Greatest Drummers of All Time" list. Variety wrote on the day he died that he was "universally recognized as one of the greatest rock drummers of all time". Music critic Rob Sheffield wrote for Rolling Stone that Watts was "rock's ultimate drum god" who "made the Stones great by conceding nothing to them". Roger Taylor of Duran Duran cites Watts as "an incredible drummer and one of my heroes".

=== Appearance ===
The Daily Telegraph named him one of the World's Best Dressed Men. In 2006, Vanity Fair elected Watts into the International Best Dressed Hall of Fame List.

== Discography ==
=== Solo ===
==== Studio albums ====
- From One Charlie – as the Charlie Watts Quintet (1991, Continuum Records)
- Warm and Tender – as the Charlie Watts Quintet (1993, Continuum Records)
- Long Ago and Far Away – as the Charlie Watts Quintet (1996, Virgin Records)
- Charlie Watts-Jim Keltner Project – as Charlie-Watts-Jim Keltner Project (2000, Cyber Octave Records)
- The Magic of Boogie Woogie – as the ABC&D of Boogie Woogie (2010, Vagabond Records)

==== Live albums ====
- Live at Fulham Town Hall – as the Charlie Watts Orchestra (1986, Columbia Records)
- A Tribute to Charlie Parker with Strings – as the Charlie Watts Quintet (1992, Continuum Records)
- Watts at Scott's – as the Charlie Watts Tentet (2004, Sanctuary Records)
- Live in Paris – as The ABC&D of Boogie Woogie (2012, Eagle Records)
- Charlie Watts Meets the Danish Radio Big Band (Live with DR Big Band at Copenhagen 2010) (2017, Impulse! Records)

==== Other appearances ====
- The End: Introspection (1969) – tablas on “Shades Of Orange”
- Ben Sidran: Feel Your Groove (1970) – drums on “The Blues In England”
- Leon Russell – Leon Russell (1970) – drums on “Roll Away The Stone”
- Howlin' Wolf – The London Howlin' Wolf Sessions (1971) – drums
- Pete Townshend & Ronnie Lane – Rough Mix (1977) – drums on “My Baby Gives It Away” & “Catmelody”
- Bob Hall & George Green: Jammin' The Boogie (1978) – drums
- Ronnie Wood: Gimme Some Neck (1979) – drums On “Worry No More”
- Rocket 88 – Rocket 88 (1981) – drums
- Ronnie Wood: 1234 (1981) – drums On “Redeyes”
- De Luxe Blues Band: Urban De Luxe (1983) – drums
- "Blues in the Cave" and "Laughing in Rhythm" for Vol pour Sidney (Aller) (1992)

=== With Willie and the Poor Boys ===
- Willie and the Poor Boys (1985)
