= 2023 in British music =

This is a summary of the year 2023 in British music.

== Events ==
=== January ===
- 6 January – Glyndebourne Festival Opera announces that its originally planned 2023 Glyndebourne on Tour season will not occur, as a result of the reduced funding from Arts Council England for the 2023–2026 National Portfolio.
- 9 January – The Royal Albert Hall announces the appointment of James Ainscough as its next chief executive director, effective in the late spring of 2023.
- 10 January – The Bournemouth Symphony Orchestra announces that Kirill Karabits is to conclude his chief conductorship of the orchestra at the close of the 2023–2024 season.
- 13 January – The BBC announces the appointment of Sam Jackson as the new controller of BBC Radio 3, effective April 2023.
- 17 January – Arts Council England (ACE) announces the presentation to English National Opera (ENO) of a one-year grant of £11.46M for the period of April 2023 – March 2024, following its previous November 2022 announcement of a total withdrawal of ACE's funding to ENO for the period 2023–2026 unless ENO relocates outside of London.
- 31 January – The Ernst von Siemens Music Foundation announces Sir George Benjamin as the recipient of the 2023 Ernst von Siemens Music Prize.

=== February ===
- 1 February – In an interview on Finnish Radio, Sir Mark Elder states that he is to stand down as music director of The Hallé in August 2024, at the close of the 2023–2024 season..
- 3 February – John Lydon loses his bid to represent Ireland in the 2023 Eurovision Song Contest, with the Public Image Ltd song "Hawaii". They lose out to Wild Youth.
- 11 February – Pensacola Christian College in the USA cancels a concert appearance by The King's Singers two hours before the scheduled performance time, after objections from a group of students, parents and college staff to the presence of homosexuals in the ensemble.
- 18 February – Twelve new pieces of music are commissioned by Charles III for his coronation, including a composition by Andrew Lloyd Webber.

=== March ===
- 7 March – The BBC releases its 2023 Classical Review 2023, whose intended plans include:
  - A reduction in the number of salaried posts in the three BBC England-based orchestras by 20%
  - The closure of the BBC Singers
- 15 March – Universal Music Group announces its purchase of Hyperion Records.
- 24 March – The BBC announces a reversal of its intended closure of the BBC Singers, following public reactions in protest at the original 7 March 2023 announcement.
- 27 March – The City of Birmingham Symphony Orchestra announces the appointment of Emma Stenning as its next chief executive, effective 3 April 2023.

=== April ===
- 12 April – Opera North announces the appointment of Laura Canning as its next general director, the first woman named to the post, effective December 2023.
- 16 April – Vox Urbane performs its inaugural concert at the Asylum Chapel in Peckham, London.
- 23 April – "I'm Gonna Be (500 Miles)" by The Proclaimers is removed from an official King's Coronation playlist celebrating British and Commonwealth artists after they were criticised for expressing anti-royal views.
- 25 April – Frankie Goes to Hollywood confirm they are to re-form in order to play a concert at the opening ceremony of the 2023 Eurovision Song Contest in Liverpool, the band's first live performance for 36 years.
- 27 April – British singer Adele joins James Corden for the final edition of Carpool Karaoke.
- 28 April – HMV announces plans to reopen its flagship store at 363 Oxford Street four years after it closed when the company went into administration.

=== May ===
- 3 May – The Rock and Roll Hall of Fame announces Kate Bush and George Michael as among its roster of inductees for 2023.
- 4 May – A jury at the United States District Court for the Southern District of New York decides that Ed Sheeran did not copy Marvin Gaye's "Let's Get It On" when composing "Thinking Out Loud".
- 5 May – The official build-up to the 2023 Eurovision Song Contest begins in Liverpool with a concert by Ukraine's Kalush Orchestra to open the fans village.
- 7 May – At the Coronation of Charles III and Camilla, the following new classical compositions receive their world premieres:
  - Judith Weir – Brighter Visions Shine Afar
  - Karl Jenkins – Crossing the Stone
  - Sarah Class – Sacred Fire
  - Nigel Hess, Roderick Williams, Shirley Thompson – Be Thou My Vision
  - Iain Farrington – Voices of the World
  - Patrick Doyle – King Charles III Coronation March
  - Paul Mealor – Kyrie Eleison (the first composition sung in Welsh at a coronation)
  - Christopher Robinson – The Recognition
  - Debbie Wiseman – Alleluia
  - Andrew Lloyd Webber – Make A Joyful Noise
  - Roxanna Panufnik – Coronation Sanctus
  - Tarik O'Regan – Coronation Agnus Dei
- 10 May – A performance by The View at Manchester's Deaf Institute comes to an abrupt end after an onstage fight breaks out between band members.
- 13 May – The 2023 Eurovision Song Contest takes place in Liverpool and is won by Sweden.

=== June ===
- 6 June – The BBC announces its new roster of New Generation Artists for the period 2023–2025:
  - James Atkinson (baritone)
  - Alim Beisembayev (pianist)
  - Chaos Quartet
  - Giorgi Gigashvili (pianist)
  - Niamh O’Sullivan (mezzo-soprano)
  - Michael Pandya (collaborative pianist)
  - Johanna Wallroth (soprano)
- 16 June
  - The BBC Concert Orchestra announces the appointment of Anna-Maria Helsing as its next chief conductor, the first female conductor to be named to the post and the first female conductor to be named chief conductor of any BBC orchestra, effective 1 October 2023, with an initial contract of three seasons.
  - King's Birthday Honours:
    - Kathryn McDowell is made a Dame Commander of the Order of the British Empire.
    - Ivor Bolton and Tasmin Little are each made a Commander of the Order of the British Empire (CBE).
    - Lucy Crowe, Janine Irons, Nicky Spence, and Caron Wheeler are each made an Officer of the Order of the British Empire (OBE)
    - Rekesh Chauhan, Peter Corry, Jennie Muskett and Jyotsna Srikanth are each made a Member of the Order of the British Empire (MBE).
- 18 June – BBC Cardiff Singer of the World 2023 competition results:
  - Main Prize: Adolfo Corrado
  - Song Prize: Sungho Kim
  - Audience Prize: Julieth Lozano Rolong
- 20 June – The Hallé announces the appointment of Wong Kah Chun as its next principal conductor and artistic advisor, effective with the 2024–2025 season, with an initial contract of 5 seasons.
- 23 June
  - The Foo Fighters make a surprise appearance at the Glastonbury Festival 2023, appearing on the Pyramid Stage.
  - The Arctic Monkeys headline the Pyramid Stage at Glastonbury 2023, their third appearance at the festival.
- 24 June
  - Rick Astley plays the Pyramid Stage at Glastonbury 2023.
  - Guns N' Roses headline the Pyramid Stage at Glastonbury 2023.
- 25 June – Elton John plays the final UK concert of his farewell tour at Glastonbury 2023, headlining the Pyramid Stage on the festival's final day.
- 27 June – Lewis Capaldi announces a sabbatical from touring for the "foreseeable future" after struggling to finish his set at Glastonbury 2023.
- 29 June – National Youth Orchestras of Scotland announce the appointment of Catherine Larsen-Maguire to the newly created post of music director, effective 2024, with an initial tenure of 3 years.

=== July ===
- 1 July – BBC Two airs a special edition of Later... with Jools Holland dedicated entirely to Noel Gallagher to coincide with the release of Council Skies, the fourth studio album by his band, Noel Gallagher's High Flying Birds.
- 4 July – Britten Pears Arts announces that Roger Wright is to stand down as its chief executive in July 2024.
- 6 July
  - The Royal College of Music announces the appointment of James Williams as its next Director, effective 1 September 2024.
  - The Royal Philharmonic Orchestra announces that James Williams is to stand down as its managing director, at the close of the 2023–2024 season.
- 14 July – The First Night of the Proms is briefly interrupted by two protestors from Just Stop Oil, who climb on stage at the Royal Albert Hall and unfurl an orange banner, before being removed by security staff.
- 27 July – Arts Council England announces an additional £24M grant for English National Opera from the period of April 2024 – March 2026, with an extended time frame to March 2029 for relocation of the company outside of London.
- 28 July
  - Hyperion Records announces that it is to make available for streaming access 200 albums from its catalogue, for the first time in the company's history.
  - Three tracks from the Barbie soundtrack enter the UK singles Chart in the top five, the first time three songs from the same soundtrack have been in the top five at the same time. The songs are What Was I Made For? by Billie Eilish at number three, Dance the Night by Dua Lipa at number four, and Barbie World by Nicki Minaj and Ice Spice at number five.

=== August ===
- 4 August – The Official Chart now has four songs from the Barbie soundtrack inside the top ten, as Speed Drive by Charli XCX reaches number 9.
- 11 August
  - The Ulster Orchestra confirms that Daniele Rustioni is to stand down as its music director at the close of the 2023–2024 season.
  - A UK Health Security Agency investigation into a number of cases of sickness and diarrhoea at the 2023 WOMAD Festival is inconclusive on a cause.
- 14 August – The BBC's Maida Vale Studios, which have been the venue for performances by artists including The Beatles and Adele, are sold to a group led by composer Hans Zimmer.
- 18 August – For the first time in its 70-year history, the top six selling singles on the Official Chart are by female artists. They are, 1: "What Was I Made For?" by Billie Eilish, 2: "Dance the Night" by Dua Lipa, 3: "Vampire" by Olivia Rodrigo, 4: "Cruel Summer" by Taylor Swift, 5: "(It Goes Like) Nanana" by Peggy Gou, and 6: "Bad Idea Right?" by Olivia Rodrigo.
- 20 August – The UK government gives the go ahead to plans for a northern version of London's BRIT School, based in Bradford.
- 23 August – An advertisement for a fictional glass repair business in the Hackney Gazette is believed to be a teaser for a new Rolling Stones album as it contains several references to the band's past songs.
- 24 August – Conductor Sir John Eliot Gardiner pulls out of the BBC Proms after being accused of assaulting a singer who left the podium in the wrong direction during a concert in France.
- 25 August – 25-year-old pianist Alim Beisembayev makes his BBC Proms debut playing Rachmaninov's Second Piano Concerto at the Royal Albert Hall as a replacement for Benjamin Grosvenor, who was taken ill.
- 31 August – Sir John Eliot Gardiner announces his withdrawal from his remaining 2023 concert engagements to seek psychological treatment, following his striking of bass William Thomas on 22 August at the Festival Berlioz in La Côte-Saint-André, France.

=== September ===
- 1 September
  - Snow Patrol frontman Gary Lightbody says the band will continue as a trio after Johnny Quinn and Paul Wilson announce their departure from the group.
  - Sophie Ellis Bextor headlines the 2023 Blackpool Illuminations switch-on concert.
- 5 September – Shireland CBSO Academy, the first school in the UK to be partnered with an orchestra, opens in West Bromwich. The school is partnered with the City of Birmingham Symphony Orchestra.
- 6 September
  - The Rolling Stones announce Hackney Diamonds, their 24th studio album and first album of original material since 2005.
  - A Yamaha baby grand piano used by Freddie Mercury to compose some of Queen's best known songs sells at auction for £1.7m.
- 7 September – Jazz quintet Ezra Collective win the 2023 Mercury Prize for their second studio album, Where I'm Meant to Be, becoming the first jazz act to win the prize.
- 9 September
  - "Sprinter", a track by Dave and Central Cee, is declared the UK Official Chart's song of summer 2023.
  - The traditional Last Night of the Proms is held at the Royal Albert Hall and in the middle of a late summer heatwave.
- 13 September
  - News reports reveal the new name of the Sage Gateshead complex as The Glasshouse International Centre for Music.
  - Jazz FM confirms that the annual Jazz FM Awards will return in Spring 2024, moving back to spring following disruption during the COVID-19 pandemic.
- 15 September
  - Sugababes release "When the Rain Comes", their first single in a decade and the first to be released since the original line-up of Mutya Buena, Keisha Buchanan and Siobhán Donaghy regained the rights to Sugababes name in 2019.
  - Lambeth Council gives the O2 Academy Brixton the go-ahead to reopen once the venue has met 77 "extensive and robust" conditions "designed to promote public safety".
- 20 September – The BBC announces the winners of its BBC Young Composer 2023 competition:
  - Lower Junior Category (age 12–14)
    - Atharv Gupta – Demain, Dès L'Aube
    - Avram Harris – Across the Void
  - Upper Junior Category (age 15–16)
    - Advaith Jagannath – Saturn Devouring his Son
    - Pascal Bachmann – Étude-Grotesque
  - Senior Category (age 17–18)
    - Jamie Smith – Into Oblivion
    - Reese Carly Manglicmot – Rumble
- 21 September – LIVE, the voice of the UK's live music industry, appoints Steve Lamacq as its new Chair.
- 25 September – Louise Redknapp and Kéllé Bryan are reported to have pulled out of a planned Eternal reunion tour scheduled for 2024 after a row occurred because their former bandmates, sisters Easther and Vernie Bennett, refused to play at LGBTQ and Pride events.

=== October ===
- 4 October – The Snug in Atherton, Greater Manchester, is the first grassroots gig venue to benefit from the Music Venue Trust's "Own Our Properties" plan, where music fans can invest in venues to save them from increasing rents and closure.
- 10 October – Bilingual pop duo Rogue Jones win the 2023 Welsh Music Prize for their album Dos Bebés.
- 15 October – Martyn Brabbins resigns as music director of English National Opera with immediate effect, in protest at proposed music personnel reductions to the company's music staff.
- 20 October – Welsh rapper Ren Gill reaches number one in the UK Albums Chart with his second album Sick Boi, an account of chronic illness that has left him unable to perform on stage.
- 25 October
  - The BBC announces the appointment of Bill Chandler as the next director of the BBC Symphony Orchestra and BBC Symphony Chorus, effective December 2023.
  - In parallel with his appointment to the BBC Symphony Orchestra and Chorus, Bill Chandler is to stand down as director of the BBC Concert Orchestra, as of December 2023.
  - The BBC announces the appointment of Adam Szabo as director of the BBC Philharmonic, effective February 2024.
  - Manchester Collective announces that Adam Szabo is to stand down as its artistic director and chief executive, effective January 2024.
- 26 October – Scottish band Young Fathers win the 2023 Scottish Album of the Year Award for their fourth album, Heavy Heavy.
- 27 October – The Dartington College of Arts announces that its planned 2024 summer school season is on hold, and the resignation of Sara Mohr-Pietsch and the summer school staff, with immediate effect.

=== November ===
- 2 November
  - "Now and Then", described by the surviving members of The Beatles as their "last song", receives its public premiere.
  - The sale of tickets for the 2024 Glastonbury Festival is delayed for two weeks "out of fairness" to customers who did not realise their registration had expired.
- 3 November
  - The re-recorded version of Taylor Swift's album 1989 becomes the fastest selling album of 2023, selling 184,000 copies in the UK in its week of release, more than doubling the sales of the original version released in 2014.
  - Orchestral Manoeuvres in the Dark achieve their highest UK studio album chart position when Bauhaus Staircase debuts at number two.
- 7 November
  - The Barbican Centre announces the appointment of Helen Wallace as its new head of music, effective February 2024.
  - Kings Place announces that Helen Wallace is to stand down as its artistic and executive director at the close of January 2024.
  - English National Ballet announces the appointment of Maria Seletskaja as its next music director, effective with the 2024–2025 season.
  - Arcangelo announces the appointment of Sir Nicholas Kenyon as its next chair of trustees, effective March 2024.
- 10 November
  - Remastered versions of The Beatles' Red Album and Blue Album are released to coincide with the issue of their final track, "Now and Then", which is included on the release.
  - "Now and Then" tops the UK Singles Chart, giving The Beatles the longest gap between the first and last number one.
- 16 November – Oxford Brookes University announces the scheduled closure of its music department and the shuttering of its music programmes in 2026.
- 17 November – The new versions of The Beatles' Red Album and Blue Album are beaten to the top of the UK Album Chart by Taylor Swift's 1989 (Taylor's Version), putting them in the same position as the original 1973 release of the albums, which were beaten to number one by David Bowie Young Americans. The Blue Album reaches number two, while the Red Album reaches number three, the same positions they were at in 1973.
- 19 November – Tickets for Glastonbury 2024 go on sale at 9.00am, and sell out within an hour.
- 22 November – The four remaining members of Girls Aloud–Cheryl Tweedy, Kimberley Walsh, Nadine Coyle and Nicola Roberts–announce a reunion tour for 2024 following an eleven year break, and will dedicate the show to their late bandmate, Sarah Harding.
- 23 November – The BBC announces that David Pickard is to stand down as director of The Proms after the 2024 season.
- 24 November
  - Organisers of the BRIT Awards announce they will update the rules for the 2024 Awards ceremony following controversy over the introduction of gender neutral awards when no female artists were nominated for Best Artist. The list of nominations for the prize will be expanded from five to ten. There will also be a prize for Best R'n'B Act.
  - Blink 182, Fred Again, Lana Del Rey and Catfish and the Bottlemen are among the acts announced as headline acts for the 2024 Reading and Leeds Festivals.
- 27 November – Members of Glasgow's Grand Ole Opry vote to ban the use of the Confederate Flag at the venue.
- 30 November – The Bristol Beacon music venue, previously known as Colston Hall, reopens after refurbishment and five years after it closed for repairs.

=== December ===
- 4 December – Glyndebourne Festival Opera announces the appointment of Adam Hickox as the new principal conductor of Glyndebourne Sinfonia, with immediate effect.
- 5 December – English National Opera announces Greater Manchester as the site of its planned new headquarters.
- 7 December – Indie band The Last Dinner Party are named winners of the 2023 Brit Award for Rising Star.
- 8 December – A total of 28 of the 40 songs in the week's Official Top 40 are festive songs, with "Last Christmas" by Wham! reaching number one for a fourth time.
- 20 December – Buckingham Palace announces that Dame Sarah Connolly is to receive The King's Medal for Music.
- 22 December – Wham!'s "Last Christmas" becomes the 2023 UK Christmas number one single 39 years after its release. Its main contender for the position, "You're Christmas to Me" by Sam Ryder, finishes at number two.
- 29 December – The 2024 New Year Honours are published.
  - Dame Shirley Bassey is made a Member of the Order of the Companions of Honour.
  - Judith Weir is made a Dame Commander of the Order of the British Empire.
  - Michael Eavis is made a Knight Bachelor.
  - Don Black and Lady Robey are each made a Commander of the Order of the British Empire.
  - James Ainscough, Paul Burger, Laurence Cummings, Michael Eakin, Yvette Griffith, and Carolyn Sampson are each made an Officer of the Order of the British Empire.
  - Rachel Cowgill, Huw Edwards, Margaret Fingerhut, Anna Lapwood, Blair Parham, Selina Webb, Carla Marie Williams and Allan Young are each made a Member of the Order of the British Empire.
  - Margaret Archibald, Wiliam Hutton, Christopher Kent, Bernard Vause, William Watson, Martin White, and Jonathan Willcocks are each awarded the British Empire Medal.
- 30 December – Busking duo Jen & Liv win Series 12 of ITV's The Voice.
- 31 December – BBC One ends 2023 with the concert Rick Astley Rocks New Year's Eve. Rick Astley is joined by various guests, including Rylan Clark with whom he performs a rendition of the Dead of Alive track "You Spin Me Round (Like a Record)".

== Bands formed ==
- Girl Group
- Sweet Love

== Bands reformed ==
- Frankie Goes to Hollywood (for performance at Eurovision Song Contest in Liverpool)
- Haircut One Hundred
- Heavenly
- Love and Rockets
- Rialto
- S Club 7
- The Soup Dragons
- Girls Aloud
- Stray

== Classical works ==
- Julian Anderson – ECHOES
- Kristina Arakelyan – Whin Lands (texts by Katrina Porteous)
- Newton Armstrong – The Book of the Sediments'
- Gerald Barry – Kafka's Earplugs
- Olivia Belli – Limina Luminis
- Laura Bowler – Advert
- Kerensa Briggs – Ode to a Savior
- Linda Buckley – Mallacht
- Anna Clyne – Weathered (clarinet concerto)
- Brian Elias – I saw a peacock
- Rufus Isabel Elliot – the stones in the river by our camp in the forest / the space on the ground where we lay
- Sadie Harrison – The River Dreams of Winter (first public performance)
- Hannah Kendall – O flower of fire
- Sarah Lianne Lewis – The Sky Didn't Fall
- Christian Mason (music) and Paul Griffiths (text) – The Singing Tree
- Grace-Evangeline Mason
  - A Memory of the Ocean
  - ABLAZE THE MOON
- David Matthews – String Quartet No. 17
- Scott McLaughlin – The Dirac Sea: Folds in continuous fields
- Roxanna Panufnik (music) and Jessica Duchen (texts) – Gallery of Memories
- Joseph Phibbs – Flame and Shadow
- Adam Pounds – Symphony No 4.
- Colin Riley – Hearing Places
- Angela Elizabeth Slater – Where skies aflame (for string quartet)
- Ryan Wigglesworth – Quatre Vignettes de Jules Renard (version for voice and orchestra)

=== New operas ===
- Sarah Angliss and Ross Sutherland – Giant
- Sir George Benjamin and Martin Crimp – Picture a Day Like This
- Conor Mitchell – Abomination: A DUP Opera
- Joby Talbot and Gene Scheer – The Diving Bell and the Butterfly'
- Philip Venables and Ted Huffman – The Faggots and Their Friends Between Revolutions

== British music awards ==
- 5 January – R&B band Flo are announced as the BBC Sound of 2023.
- 11 February – The 2023 Brit Awards are held at The O2 Arena in London, and presented by comedian Mo Gilligan.
- 7 September – The 2023 Mercury Prize is awarded at London's Hammersmith Apollo.
- 10 October – The 2023 Welsh Music Prize is awarded at a ceremony in Cardiff's Wales Millennium Centre.
- 26 October
  - The 2023 UK Music Video Awards are held at Magazine London in London, to recognise the best in music videos and music film making from United Kingdom and worldwide.
  - The Scottish Album of the Year Award is presented at Stirling's Albert Halls.

== Charts and sales ==
=== Number-one singles ===
The singles chart includes a proportion for streaming.

Key
†	Best performing single of the year

Chart date (week ending)	Song	Artist(s)	Chart sales	References
5 January	"Last Christmas"	Wham!	79,622	
12 January	"Escapism"	Raye featuring 070 Shake	45,570	
19 January	"Pointless"	Lewis Capaldi	55,903	
26 January	"Flowers" †	Miley Cyrus	91,731	
2 February	"Flowers" †	Miley Cyrus	121,151	
9 February	"Flowers" †	Miley Cyrus	106,508	
16 February	"Flowers" †	Miley Cyrus	81,435	
23 February	"Flowers" †	Miley Cyrus	72,975	
2 March	"Flowers" †	Miley Cyrus	64,259	
9 March	"Flowers" †	Miley Cyrus	56,374	
16 March	"Flowers" †	Miley Cyrus	53,686	
23 March	"Flowers" †	Miley Cyrus	56,815	
30 March	"Flowers" †	Miley Cyrus	52,340	
6 April	"Eyes Closed"	Ed Sheeran	60,265	
13 April	"Miracle"	Calvin Harris and Ellie Goulding	49,753	
20 April	"Miracle"	Calvin Harris and Ellie Goulding	45,563	
27 April	"Wish You the Best"	Lewis Capaldi	49,587	
4 May	"Miracle"	Calvin Harris and Ellie Goulding	44,178	
11 May	"Miracle"	Calvin Harris and Ellie Goulding	47,671	
18 May	"Miracle"	Calvin Harris and Ellie Goulding	41,057	
25 May	"Miracle"	Calvin Harris and Ellie Goulding	42,378	
1 June	"Miracle"	Calvin Harris and Ellie Goulding	44,291	
8 June	"Miracle"	Calvin Harris and Ellie Goulding	45,536	
15 June	"Sprinter"	Dave and Central Cee	108,200	
22 June	"Sprinter"	Dave and Central Cee	89,194	
29 June	"Sprinter"	Dave and Central Cee	71,086	
6 July	"Sprinter"	Dave and Central Cee	67,346	
13 July	"Sprinter"	Dave and Central Cee	61,918	
20 July	"Sprinter"	Dave and Central Cee	62,680	
27 July	"Sprinter"	Dave and Central Cee	63,487	
3 August	"Sprinter"	Dave and Central Cee	59,397	
10 August	"Sprinter"	Dave and Central Cee	53,518	
17 August	"Sprinter"	Dave and Central Cee	49,021	
24 August	"What Was I Made For?"	Billie Eilish	45,488	
31 August	"Dance the Night"	Dua Lipa	41,204	
7 September	"Vampire"	Olivia Rodrigo	43,211	
14 September	"Paint the Town Red"	Doja Cat	57,962	
21 September	"Paint the Town Red"	Doja Cat	54,414	
28 September	"Paint the Town Red"	Doja Cat	50,144	
5 October	"Paint the Town Red"	Doja Cat	48,890	
12 October	"Paint the Town Red"	Doja Cat	41,014	
19 October	"Strangers"	Kenya Grace	40,152	
26 October	"Strangers"	Kenya Grace	38,809	
2 November	"Strangers"	Kenya Grace	37,139	
9 November	"Is It Over Now?"	Taylor Swift	45,360	
16 November	"Now and Then"	The Beatles	78,168	
23 November	"Lovin on Me"	Jack Harlow	46,389	
30 November	"Lovin on Me"	Jack Harlow	52,688	
7 December	"Lovin on Me"	Jack Harlow	55,128	
14 December	"Last Christmas"	Wham!	53,473	
21 December	"Last Christmas"	Wham!	48,643	
28 December	"Last Christmas"	Wham!	61,784	

=== Number-one albums ===
The albums chart includes a proportion for streaming.

The best-performing album of 2023, The Highlights by The Weeknd, peaked at number two on the UK Albums Chart dated week ending 9 February 2023.

Chart date (week ending)	Album	Artist(s)	Chart sales	References
5 January	Christmas	Michael Bublé	19,985	
12 January	Midnights	Taylor Swift	11,311	
19 January	Midnights	Taylor Swift	10,003	
26 January	St. Jude	Courteeners	19,022	
2 February	What's Rock and Roll?	The Reytons	12,252	
9 February	Gloria	Sam Smith	14,155	
16 February	Queen of Me	Shania Twain	17,976	
23 February	This Is Why	Paramore	21,093	
2 March	Trustfall	Pink	37,570	
9 March	Cracker Island	Gorillaz	22,440	
16 March	From Nothing to a Little Bit More	The Lathums	17,937	
23 March	Endless Summer Vacation	Miley Cyrus	18,746	
30 March	Songs of Surrender	U2	20,569	
6 April	Did You Know That There's a Tunnel Under Ocean Blvd	Lana Del Rey	41,925	
13 April	The Record	Boygenius	18,869	
20 April	Higher Than Heaven	Ellie Goulding	11,818	
27 April	72 Seasons	Metallica	29,249	
4 May	A Kiss for the Whole World	Enter Shikari	13,513	
11 May	Anxiety Replacement Therapy	The Lottery Winners	22,209	
18 May	-	Ed Sheeran	76,263	
25 May	-	Ed Sheeran	18,381	
1 June	Broken by Desire to Be Heavenly Sent	Lewis Capaldi	95,882	
8 June	Broken by Desire to Be Heavenly Sent	Lewis Capaldi	12,187	
15 June	But Here We Are	Foo Fighters	44,513	
22 June	The Show	Niall Horan	26,937	
29 June	What Ifs & Maybes	Tom Grennan	27,065	
6 July	The Good Witch	Maisie Peters	20,760	
13 July	Dead Club City	Nothing but Thieves	13,622	
20 July	Speak Now (Taylor's Version)	Taylor Swift	67,112	
27 July	Beautiful and Brutal Yard	J Hus	17,260	
3 August	The Ballad of Darren	Blur	44,051	
10 August	Utopia	Travis Scott	25,027	
17 August	Victory	Cian Ducrot	15,668	
24 August	Knebworth 22	Liam Gallagher	16,204	
31 August	Unreal Unearth	Hozier	19,068	
7 September	I Told Them...	Burna Boy	14,164	
14 September	Back to the Water Below	Royal Blood	18,856	
21 September	Guts	Olivia Rodrigo	60,272	
28 September	Greatest Hits 2.0	Busted	27,319	
5 October	Tension	Kylie Minogue	53,237	
12 October	Autumn Variations	Ed Sheeran	30,016	
19 October	For All the Dogs	Drake	29,408	
26 October	Sick Boi	Ren	18,653	
2 November	Hackney Diamonds	The Rolling Stones	72,204	
9 November	1989 (Taylor's Version)	Taylor Swift	184,965	
16 November	1989 (Taylor's Version)	Taylor Swift	23,561	
23 November	1989 (Taylor's Version)	Taylor Swift	16,773	
30 November	Theatre of the Absurd Presents C'est la Vie	Madness	18,024	
7 December	This Life	Take That	116,163	
14 December	I/O	Peter Gabriel	15,645	
21 December	Rebel Diamonds	The Killers	25,360	
28 December	Hackney Diamonds	The Rolling Stones	16,460	

=== Number-one compilation albums ===
The compilation chart includes a proportion for streaming.

Key
†	Best performing compilation of the year

Chart date (week ending)	Album	Chart sales	References
5 January	Now 113	3,925	
12 January	The Greatest Showman	2,593	
19 January	Now Yearbook Extra 1985	3,016	
26 January	The Greatest Showman	2,556	
2 February	The Greatest Showman	2,459	
9 February	The Greatest Showman	2,549	
16 February	The Greatest Showman	2,435	
23 February	Now Yearbook Extra 1980–1984	2,984	
2 March	Now Dance – The 80s	4,328	
9 March	Now Yearbook 1986	5,495	
16 March	The Greatest Showman	2,290	
23 March	Now 60s Pop	4,767	
30 March	The Greatest Showman	2,371	
6 April	Dance Craze: The Best of British Ska...Live	3,810	
13 April	The Greatest Showman	2,522	
20 April	Now Yearbook Extra 1986	3,392	
27 April	Now 114	10,946	
4 May	Now 114	4,399	
11 May	Now Yearbook 1978	6,710	
18 May	Guardians of the Galaxy Vol. 3	4,978	
25 May	Eurovision Song Contest 2023	17,477	
1 June	Eurovision Song Contest 2023	9,772	
8 June	Eurovision Song Contest 2023	6,322	
15 June	Spider-Man: Across the Spider-Verse	7,518	
22 June	Spider-Man: Across the Spider-Verse	6,655	
29 June	Spider-Man: Across the Spider-Verse	5,298	
6 July	Spider-Man: Across the Spider-Verse	4,193	
13 July	Spider-Man: Across the Spider-Verse	3,285	
20 July	Now Yearbook 1992	4,205	
27 July	Now 12" 80s: 1980	2,296	
3 August	Barbie the Album †	21,207	
10 August	Barbie the Album †	20,653	
17 August	Barbie the Album †	16,778	
24 August	Barbie the Album †	14,041	
31 August	Barbie the Album †	12,213	
7 September	Barbie the Album †	10,511	
14 September	Barbie the Album †	9,643	
21 September	Barbie the Album †	8,226	
28 September	Barbie the Album †	7,301	
5 October	Barbie the Album †	6,577	
12 October	Barbie the Album †	5,712	
19 October	Barbie the Album †	5,205	
26 October	Barbie the Album †	4,500	
2 November	Barbie the Album †	4,531	
9 November	Barbie the Album †	4,085	
16 November	Now Yearbook 1988	5,865	
23 November	Barbie the Album †	3,529	
30 November	Now 116	9,709	
7 December	Now 40 Years	7,263	
14 December	Now Christmas	7,711	
21 December	Now Christmas	7,982	
28 December	Now Christmas	8,255	

== Year-end charts ==
=== Top singles of the year ===
This chart was published by the Official Charts Company on 29 December 2023

No.	Title	Artist(s)	Peak position	Combined
1	"Flowers"	Miley Cyrus	1	1,700,000
2	"Sprinter"	Dave and Central Cee	1	1,200,000
3	"Escapism"	Raye featuring 070 Shake	1	1,200,000
4	"Anti-Hero"	Taylor Swift	2 (Note: Reached number 1 in 2022)	1,100,000
5	"Miracle"	Calvin Harris and Ellie Goulding	1	
6	"Calm Down"	Rema	3	
7	"Kill Bill"	SZA	3	
8	"Boy's a Liar"	PinkPantheress	2	
9	"As It Was"	Harry Styles	4 (Note: Reached number 1 in 2022)	
10	"People"	Libianca	2	
11	"Cruel Summer"	Taylor Swift	2	
12	"Sure Thing"	Miguel	4	
13	"I'm Good (Blue)"	David Guetta and Bebe Rexha	16 (Note: Reached number 1 in 2022)	
14	"Vampire"	Olivia Rodrigo	1	
15	"Messy in Heaven"	Venbee and Goddard.	3	
16	"Daylight"	David Kushner	2	
17	"Die for You"	The Weeknd	3	
18	"Last Christmas"	Wham!	1	
19	"Dance the Night"	Dua Lipa	1	
20	"React"	Switch Disco and Ella Henderson	4	
21	"Another Love"	Tom Odell	10	
22	"Mr. Brightside"	The Killers	53 (Note: Reached number 10 in 2004)	
23	"Creepin'"	Metro Boomin, The Weeknd and 21 Savage	7	
24	"I Ain't Worried"	OneRepublic	30 (Note: Reached number 3 in 2022)	
25	"Forget Me"	Lewis Capaldi	7 (Note: Reached number 1 in 2022)	
26	"Paint the Town Red"	Doja Cat	1	
27	"Someone You Loved"	Lewis Capaldi	49 (Note: Reached number 1 in 2019)	
28	"Giving Me"	Jazzy	3	
29	"All I Want For Christmas Is You"	Mariah Carey	2 (Note: Reached number 1 in 2020)	
30	"Bad Habits"	Ed Sheeran	44 (Note: Reached number 1 in 2021)	
31	"Eyes Closed"	Ed Sheeran	1	
32	"Green Green Grass"	George Ezra	9 (Note: Reached number 3 in 2022)	
33	"Prada"	Cassö, Raye and D-Block Europe	2	
34	"Unholy"	Sam Smith and Kim Petras	13 (Note: Reached number 1 in 2022)	
35	"Ceilings"	Lizzy McAlpine	6	
36	"Made You Look"	Meghan Trainor	5 (Note: Reached number 2 in 2022)	
37	"10:35"	Tiësto and Tate McRae	8	
38	"Shivers"	Ed Sheeran	43 (Note: Reached number 1 in 2021)	
39	"Until I Found You"	Stephen Sanchez	14	
40	"Riptide"	Vance Joy	67 (Note: Reached number 10 in 2014)	

=== Best-selling albums ===
This chart was published by the Official Charts Company on 3 January 2024

For the first time in British music history, an album that never reached number one on the weekly chart became the biggest-selling album of the year. The Highlights, by The Weeknd, also sold all its albums in digital and streaming formats.

No.	Title	Artist	Peak position	Combined
1	The Highlights	The Weeknd	2	391,000
2	Midnights	Taylor Swift	1	
3	1989 (Taylor's Version)	Taylor Swift	1	299,000
4	Diamonds	Elton John	2	
5	Harry's House	Harry Styles	2 (Note: Reached number 1 in 2022)	
6	50 Years – Don't Stop	Fleetwood Mac	6 (Note: Reached number 5 in 2018)	
7	Curtain Call: The Hits	Eminem	5 (Note: Reached number 1 in 2005)	
8	SOS	SZA	2	
9	AM	Arctic Monkeys	9 (Note: Reached number 1 in 2013)	
10	ABBA Gold	ABBA	10 (Note: Reached number 1 in 1992)	
11	Lover	Taylor Swift	8 (Note: Reached number 1 in 2019)	
12	1989	Taylor Swift	5 (Note: Reached number 1 in 2014)	
13	Folklore	Taylor Swift	6 (Note: Reached number 1 in 2020)	
14	Broken By Desire To Be Heavenly Sent	Lewis Capaldi	1	210,000
15	Guts	Olivia Rodrigo	1	209,000
16	Sour	Olivia Rodrigo	5 (Note: Reached number 1 in 2021)	
17	Divinely Uninspired To A Hellish Extent	Lewis Capaldi	4 (Note: Reached number 1 in 2019)	
18	Time Flies... 1994-2009	Oasis	15 (Note: Reached number 1 in 2010)	
19	=	Ed Sheeran	4 (Note: Reached number 1 in 2021)	
20	Greatest Hits	Queen	13 (Note: Reached number 1 in 1981)	
21	Reputation	Taylor Swift	13 (Note: Reached number 1 in 2017)	
22	Rumours	Fleetwood Mac	12 (Note: Reached number 1 in 1978)	
23	-	Ed Sheeran	1	
24	Speak Now (Taylor's Version)	Taylor Swift	1	
25	The Essential Michael Jackson	Michael Jackson	18 (Note: Reached number 1 in 2009)	
26	÷	Ed Sheeran	16 (Note: Reached number 1 in 2017)	
27	Hackney Diamonds	The Rolling Stones	1	
28	Born to Die	Lana Del Rey	22 (Note: Reached number 1 in 2012)	
29	Trustfall	Pink	1	
30	Fine Line	Harry Styles	13 (Note: Reached number 2 in 2021)	
31	Curtain Call 2	Eminem	21 (Note: Reached number 3 in 2022)	
32	Starboy	The Weeknd	23 (Note: Reached number 5 in 2016)	
33	Between Us	Little Mix	20 (Note: Reached number 3 in 2022)	
34	The Diamond Collection	Post Malone	14	
35	(What's the Story) Morning Glory?	Oasis	26 (Note: Reached number 1 in 1995)	
36	I Will Always Love You: The Best of Whitney Houston	Whitney Houston	13	
37	This Life	Take That	1	
38	ELV1S: 30 No. 1 Hits	Elvis Presley	22 (Note: Reached number 1 in 2002)	
39	Renaissance	Beyoncé	6 (Note: Reached number 1 in 2022)	
40	Singles	Maroon 5	35 (Note: Reached number 32 in 2021)	

== Deaths ==
- 2 January – Andrew Downes, English classical composer, 72
- 3 January – Alan Rankine, Scottish musician, producer, member of (the Associates), 64
- 10 January – Jeff Beck, English guitarist, singer, (The Yardbirds), (Jeff Beck Group), 78
- 15 January – Bruce Gowers, English music video director ("Bohemian Rhapsody"), 82
- 2 February – Tim Quy, English musician, (Cardiacs), 61
- 5 February – Phil Spalding, English bassist, session musician, 65
- 8 February – Hilary Tann, Wales-born composer resident in the USA, 75
- 19 February – Christopher Nupen, classical music documentary filmmaker, 88
- 25 February – Sir David Lumsden, English organist, harpischordist and choirmaster, 94
- 2 March
  - Steve Mackey, English bassist, producer, (Pulp), 56
  - Nicholas Snowman, arts administrator and co-founder of the London Sinfonietta, 78
- 5 March – Kenneth Montgomery, classical conductor, 79
- 13 March – Simon Emmerson, English record producer, guitarist, DJ, musical director, founder of (Afro Celt Sound System), 67
- 16 March – Tony Coe, English jazz musician, 88
- 24 March – Christopher Gunning, English composer, 78
- 25 March – Nicholas Lloyd Webber, English composer, 43
- 27 March – James Bowman, classical countertenor, 81
- 6 April – Paul Cattermole, English singer, (S Club 7), 46
- 7 April – Ian Bairnson, Scottish musician, multi-instrumentalist, (Alan Parsons Project), (Pilot), guitarist for (Kate Bush), 69
- 8 April – Bob Heatlie, Scottish songwriter, record producer, 76
- 14 April – Mark Sheehan, Irish guitarist, singer-songwriter, (The Script), (Mytown), 46
- 20 April – David Ellis, composer and music administrator, 90
- 21 April – Mark Stewart, English musician (The Pop Group), 62.
- 27 April – Wee Willie Harris, English singer, musician, 90
- 3 May – Linda Lewis, English singer-songwriter ("Rock-a-Doodle-Doo"), 72
- 10 May – Rolf Harris, Australian singer ("Jake the Peg", "Two Little Boys"), 93
- 11 May – Francis Monkman, English musician, composer and songwriter (Curved Air), (Sky), (Matching Mole), 73
- 17 May – Algy Ward, English bassist, (Tank), (The Damned), (The Saints), 63
- 19 May – Andy Rourke, English bassist, (The Smiths), 59
- 22 May – Chas Newby, English bassist, (The Beatles), 81
- 28 May – George Cassidy, Northern Irish jazz musician and music teacher of Van Morrison, 86
- 6 June – Tony McPhee, English guitarist (The Groundhogs), 79
- 16 June – Peter Dickinson, composer, musicologist, author, and pianist, 86
- 20 June – John Waddington, English guitarist (The Pop Group), (Maximum Joy), (Perfume), 63
- 29 June – Clarence Barlow, composer, 77
- 3 July – Mo Foster, English multi-instrumentalist (Affinity), (Fancy), (RMS) and record producer, 78
- 5 July – Anthony Gilbert, composer and academic, 88
- 6 July – Graham Clark, English opera tenor, 81
- 16 July – Jane Birkin, English-French singer, actress, 76
- 17 July – Barry Martyn, English jazz drummer, 82
- 19 July – Mark Thomas, British film composer (Twin Town, The Final Curtain, Agent Cody Banks 2: Destination London), 67
- 21 July – Vince Hill, English traditional pop singer ("Edelweiss", "Roses of Picardy", "Merci, Chérie"), 89
- 23 July – Raymond Froggatt, English singer-songwriter ("Callow-la-vita", "Big Ship", "Rachel"), 81
- 26 July – Sinéad O'Connor, singer, 56
- 28 July – Jim Parker, British composer ("Captain Beaky and His Band", themes of Midsomer Murders, House of Cards, Foyle's War), 88
- 3 August – Carl Davis, American-born British conductor and composer, 86
- 13 August – Patricia Bredin, UK's first Eurovision Song Contest participant in 1957, 88
- 24 August – Bernie Marsden, English hard rock guitarist (UFO), (Whitesnake), 72
- 3 September – Simon Pearson, English drummer (The Wedding Present), (Cinerama), (Goya Dress), 53
- 5 September –
  - Joe Fagin, English singer-songwriter, 83
  - Bruce Guthro, Canadian-born vocalist (Runrig), 62
- 13 September – Roger Whittaker, English singer-songwriter, musician, 87
- 21 October – Carroll Coates, 94, British-American songwriter, composer and lyricist.
- 23 October – Angelo Bruschini, 62, English guitarist (The Blue Aeroplanes, Massive Attack), lung cancer.
- 3 November – Pete Garner, English bassist, (The Stone Roses), 61
- 5 November – Ryland Davies, classical tenor, 80
- 8 November – Keel Watson, classical bass-baritone, 69
- 16 November – Peter Solley, 75, English musician (Fox) and record producer.
- 25 November – Les Maguire, 81, English musician (Gerry and the Pacemakers).
- 26 November –
  - Brian Godding, 78, Welsh jazz rock guitarist (Blossom Toes, Centipede).
  - Geordie Walker, English guitarist, (Killing Joke), 64.
- 30 November – Shane MacGowan, 65, English-born Irish singer (The Pogues, Shane MacGowan and the Popes) and songwriter ("Fairytale of New York").
- 4 December – John Hyatt, English vocalist (The Three Johns).
- 5 December – Denny Laine, 79, English Hall of Fame musician (Wings, The Moody Blues) and songwriter ("Mull of Kintyre").
- 11 December – John "Rambo" Stevens, English music producer and manager.
- 12 December –
  - Richard Gaddes, opera administrator active in the United States, 81
  - Richard Kerr, 78, English singer, songwriter ("Mandy", "I'll Never Love This Way Again", "Looks Like We Made It") and composer. (death announced on this date)
- 15 December – Steve Halliwell, 77, English actor (Emmerdale, Coronation Street) and singer (The Woolpackers).
- 17 December – Mike Maxfield, 79, English songwriter and guitarist (The Dakotas). (death announced on this date)
- 18 December – Ronnie Caryl, 70, English guitarist (Flaming Youth, Phil Collins).
- 26 December – Tony Oxley, 85, English free improvising drummer, co-founder of Incus Records.

== See also ==
- 2023 in British radio
- 2023 in British television
- 2023 in the United Kingdom
- List of British films of 2023
