= Ron Francis (disambiguation) =

Ron Francis (born 1963) is a Canadian retired NHL player and executive for the Seattle Kraken.

Ron Francis may refer to:

- Ron Francis (artist) (born 1954), Australian artist
- Ron Francis Blake (born 1972), American trumpeter
- Ron Francis (gridiron football) (born 1964), American former NFL player
