= Albert Halls =

Albert Halls may refer to:

- The Albert Halls, Stirling
- The Albert Halls, Bolton

Not to be confused with the Royal Albert Hall in London.
