= Sweet Sounds of Heaven =

2023 single by the Rolling Stones

Single by the Rolling Stones featuring Lady Gaga

from the album Hackney Diamonds
- Released: 28 September 2023
- Recorded: January 2023
- Studio: Henson Recording Studios (Los Angeles, California); Metropolis Studios (London, England); Sanctuary Studios (Nassau, Bahamas)
- Genre: Rock; blues; soul; gospel
- Length: 7:22; 5:06 (edit)
- Label: Polydor; Geffen
- Songwriters: Mick Jagger; Keith Richards
- Producer: Andrew Watt

The Rolling Stones singles chronology
"Angry" (2023)	"Sweet Sounds of Heaven" (2023)	"Mess It Up" (2023)

Lady Gaga singles chronology
"Bloody Mary" (2022)	"Sweet Sounds of Heaven" (2023)	"Die with a Smile" (2024)

"Sweet Sounds of Heaven" is a song by English rock band the Rolling Stones, featuring American singer Lady Gaga. It was released on 28 September 2023 as the second single from the band's studio album Hackney Diamonds (2023). Written by Mick Jagger and Keith Richards and produced by Andrew Watt, the song originated from a piano composition by Jagger. Watt suggested inviting Stevie Wonder, who contributed piano, Fender Rhodes and Moog bass, while Gaga became involved spontaneously during a recording session at a neighbouring studio. Musically, "Sweet Sounds of Heaven" incorporates elements of gospel, rock, soul and blues, gradually building over seven minutes to an extended vocal interplay between Jagger and Gaga. Its lyrics address themes of nationalism, poverty and mortality. Several journalists compared the song to the band's "Gimme Shelter" (1969), particularly likening Gaga's vocal performance to that of Merry Clayton on the earlier recording.

"Sweet Sounds of Heaven" received positive reviews from music critics, several of whom considered it the standout track of Hackney Diamonds. Reviewers particularly praised the vocal interplay between Jagger and Gaga, with some regarding the song as one of the band's strongest recordings in decades. Commercially, "Sweet Sounds of Heaven" peaked at number two on the UK Singles Sales Chart and entered the national singles charts in the Netherlands, Switzerland and Germany, reaching numbers 42, 72 and 84, respectively. The Rolling Stones performed it live with Gaga for the first time at a surprise concert celebrating the album's release at the Racket club in New York City on 19 October 2023. The performance was subsequently released as a live recording in December. The song was also included in 17 of the 20 concerts on the band's Hackney Diamonds Tour (2024), usually appearing as the first number of the encore. Backing vocalist Chanel Haynes performed Gaga's parts during the tour, receiving praise from critics for her powerful vocals.

== Background and recording ==
Mick Jagger initially developed "Sweet Sounds of Heaven" at his home in London, playing a chord progression of C, F and B-flat on the piano. During pre-production in Paris for the band's 2023 studio album Hackney Diamonds, he played an early version of the song for producer Andrew Watt. Watt described its chord structure as relatively simple and compared its gospel style to earlier Rolling Stones songs such as "You Can't Always Get What You Want" (1969) and "Shine a Light" (1972). He suggested inviting Stevie Wonder to play on the track, an idea Jagger immediately supported. Wonder had previously toured with the Rolling Stones as their support act in 1972 and occasionally joined them on stage to perform "(I Can't Get No) Satisfaction". Wonder played piano, Fender Rhodes and Moog bass on the track, while its horn line was built around his bass line. During the session, Watt called out the chords and sections to Wonder, who devised a bass line by singing it to him. Watt worked out the part on bass; it subsequently became a recurring theme played by the guitars, while Wonder performed it on Moog bass. Jagger said that Wonder's use of gospel chords helped bring the song "to another level". Wonder recalled that the song reminded him of the band's late drummer Charlie Watts, although he viewed it as a celebration rather than a farewell.

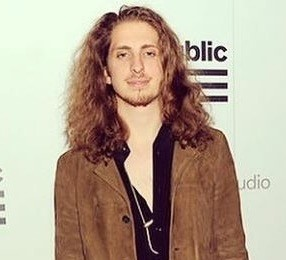
Andrew Watt produced "Sweet Sounds of Heaven" and helped develop its musical arrangement during the recording sessions.

Jagger worked with drummer Steve Jordan to develop the song's rhythmic feel, using the drumbeat to refine the timing of its lyrics. The band recorded "Sweet Sounds of Heaven" largely live at Henson Recording Studios in Los Angeles in January 2023, with the musicians playing together in the same room, although additional parts were subsequently overdubbed. Watt chose to work alongside the musicians in the live room rather than the control room, allowing him to help develop arrangements and communicate with individual band members during the sessions. He described Hackney Diamonds as a performance-based record whose live approach allowed the music to naturally speed up, slow down and "push and pull". Keith Richards said that "Sweet Sounds of Heaven" initially developed as an Otis Redding-style soul song rather than from a deliberate attempt to write gospel music. He described soul and gospel as longstanding influences on the band and said the song evolved organically as the musicians worked on it together in the room.

Lady Gaga, who had previously joined the Rolling Stones on stage in Newark, New Jersey, in December 2012 to sing "Gimme Shelter" during their 50th-anniversary shows, became involved with the recording while working on music related to the jukebox musical film Joker: Folie à Deux in an adjacent studio. She met Watt for the first time during these sessions. After asking Jagger if she could stop by, she heard him singing and began joining in spontaneously. Watt recalled that Gaga entered while the band was recording takes with Wonder; Jagger invited her into the live room, where she sat on the floor with headphones and a microphone and joined the session without having planned to perform. According to Watt, she had heard the song only once beforehand. Jagger recalled giving her headphones and initially having her contribute "oohs and aahs", before asking her to sing the lyrics; he said the collaboration "came together very quickly".

The band responded positively to her contribution, and Gaga later returned for another session to record the version included on Hackney Diamonds. Jagger recalled that Gaga gradually became more confident during the session; he and Gaga eventually recorded face-to-face, tightening their vocal parts before becoming "slightly competitive" as they traded increasingly forceful vocals. Wonder also praised Gaga's versatility and described her performance as having a soulful quality. Andrew Watt and the band subsequently refined the recording. The final mix was completed by Jagger, Watt and a mixing engineer working from three separate locations.

== Composition ==
"Sweet Sounds of Heaven" opens with a rolling piano riff and Jagger singing alone before Gaga joins him in the second verse, initially echoing his lines in a high, gospel-influenced register, while Wonder accompanies the band on keyboards and bass. As the song progresses, Gaga's vocals increasingly double Jagger's before the arrangement builds after the five-minute mark with guitar, drums, saxophone and keyboards and culminates in the pair trading soul-inflected vocals. Richards noted that the song's false ending initially puzzled him, but said that he came to appreciate it once he became immersed in the performance's flow. Discussing the full-length recording, music critic Bob Lefsetz observed that the arrangement becomes quieter and more stripped-back after the point where the five-minute edit ends, with piano accompaniment, Gaga's improvised vocals and Jagger's singing coming to the forefront. He compared this section to the band's blues roots.

Stevie Wonder's contributions on piano, Fender Rhodes and Moog bass were central to the arrangement of "Sweet Sounds of Heaven".

The song incorporates elements of gospel, rock, soul and blues. Rolling Stone described it as having a "gospel vibe" and developing over approximately seven minutes into a "free-flowing soul journey", while American Songwriter characterized it as a fusion of rock and roll and soul music. The Financial Times classified the song as gospel rock, and Billboard as gospel blues. Paste additionally characterized the song as a convergence of "full-throated R&B and anthemic stadium rock" with the emotional qualities of classic soul music. The Independent described the song as a seven-minute spiritual crescendo built on a "slow-burning Pentecostal groove", with Gaga contributing gospel-style vocal trills and Jagger delivering a sermon-like performance.

Several journalists compared the song to the Let It Bleed (1969) track "Gimme Shelter", particularly Gaga's vocal delivery, which was likened to Merry Clayton's performance on that song. (Note: Attributed to multiple references:) Bob Lefsetz similarly drew parallels between Gaga's singing and the backing vocals on "Let It Loose" (1972). Slant Magazine's Jeremy Winograd situated the song more broadly within the band's earlier work, characterizing it as a "full-blown gospel rave-up" reminiscent of the 1972 album Exile on Main St., while noting that despite evoking an earlier Stones era, it did not sound "overtly retro".

The lyrics address nationalism, poverty and mortality; according to Pitchfork's Grayson Haver Currin, Jagger confronts the prospect of his own death while resisting continued excess. Neil McCormick of The Daily Telegraph interpreted Jagger's references to heavenly reward as being tempered by an unwillingness to confront death, instead emphasizing earthly pleasures and continued vitality in old age. He viewed the song as an expression of the band's ethos of "rocking till they drop".

== Release ==
The band teased "Sweet Sounds of Heaven" on Instagram on 25 September 2023, sharing a short excerpt and announcing that it would be released three days later. On 28 September, the song was released digitally in two versions: a full-length recording lasting seven minutes and twenty-two seconds and a shortened edit lasting five minutes and six seconds. The latter omits the extended concluding passage of the original recording. A lyric video for the edit was uploaded to the Rolling Stones' official YouTube channel on the day of its release, while Apple Music released an interview with Mick Jagger about the track.

The single's cover artwork followed the visual style of Hackney Diamonds, depicting an illustrated upturned hand emerging from a glittering pool of water alongside the song title and an adaptation of the band's tongue-and-lips logo. The artwork was designed by Studio Fury as part of the wider Hackney Diamonds visual campaign.

On 13 October, "Sweet Sounds of Heaven" was released on CD and limited-edition 10-inch vinyl, the latter featuring an etched B-side. A Japanese SHM-CD edition followed on 24 November, featuring the shortened edit as a bonus track.

== Critical reception ==
Critics singled out the vocal interplay between Mick Jagger and Lady Gaga as one of the main strengths of "Sweet Sounds of Heaven".

Upon release, "Sweet Sounds of Heaven" drew considerable praise from music critics, several of whom later considered it the standout song of Hackney Diamonds. (Note: Attributed to multiple references:) Ludovic Hunter-Tilney of the Financial Times called it "magnificently melodramatic", while Stephen Thomas Erlewine of AllMusic found it "a showstopping ballad" that "sounds stronger with each repeated listen". The Daily Telegraph's Neil McCormick rated "Sweet Sounds of Heaven" five out of five stars, stating that the band was in "exultant form" and calling the track "a thrilling, uplifting proto-gospel song that belongs in the very highest echelons of the Stones' starry catalogue". Ed Potton of The Times described the song as a "jam session for the gods", applauding the ensemble performance. Terry Staunton of Record Collector considered it a potential enduring highlight of the album, describing the Stones as being at their "most passionate" and praising Gaga's "earthy vocal jousting" with Jagger. Matthew Mitchell of Paste regarded "Sweet Sounds of Heaven" as potentially the Stones' best song since "Emotional Rescue" (1980) and commended Jagger, Gaga and Wonder's contributions to the track, calling the song an "instant classic". Robin Murray of Clash similarly deemed it "the album’s pinnacle, and also arguably the Stones' finest 21st century recording", praising Gaga as "one of her generation's finest vocal technicians" whose "wonderfully over-the-top performance lifts the entire song to another level".

Several critics focused on the vocal interplay between Jagger and Gaga. Jonah Krueger of Consequence described the "anthemic, surprisingly emotional cut" as "one of the best late-stage songs the Stones have to offer", with the vocal exchanges between the pair "[making] the extended track feel like it breezes by in an instant". John Murphy of musicOMH called the song the album's "most startling moment", characterizing Jagger and Gaga's performance as less a duet than "a battle for vocal supremacy". Tim Cumming of The Arts Desk called "Sweet Sounds of Heaven" a "freshly minted classic", praising its "thrilling and all-enveloping" live-in-the-room quality and describing Gaga's climactic falsetto battle with Jagger as "totally over the top and totally brilliant". Kristen S. Hé of Vulture considered it "one of the Stones' most ambitious songs in decades" and noted the chemistry between Jagger and Gaga, concluding that "the magic is palpable". Matt Hanson of The Arts Fuse argued that Gaga provided "vocals that push Jagger's to greater heights", describing how the pair encouraged each other as the horn section built towards the song's climax. He felt that their spontaneous exchanges recalled the musical qualities that had distinguished the band's earlier work.

"Sweet Sounds of Heaven"
A 30-second excerpt featuring Jagger's expressive lead vocals, Gaga's gospel-influenced singing and Wonder's keyboard accompaniment, elements emphasised by music critics.

Other reviewers highlighted the song's ambition and the individual performances. Writing for Spin, Al Shipley described it as a "triumphant big swing" at something the Stones had not done before, which he considered "a true rarity" for the band in the 21st century. Despite his negative assessment of Hackney Diamonds overall, Grayson Haver Currin of Pitchfork singled out "Sweet Sounds of Heaven" as a moment in which "actual feeling and fight" emerged in Jagger's voice, finding him most convincing when addressing mortality and other immediate concerns. The Independent's Mark Beaumont called it a "statement song worthy of rounding off a career this monumental" and said that it revived the "gritty passions" of "Gimme Shelter". Ian Fortnam of Classic Rock called Jagger's performance a "master class" and praised Gaga as being "in fine voice", while noting that neither she nor Wonder drew attention away from the band. Alan Corr of RTÉ commended Gaga's vocals as "perhaps [her] finest-ever" and Wonder's keyboard playing as "astounding". John Wohlmacher of Beats Per Minute praised the song's energy and Gaga's performance, likening her vocals to Tina Turner and writing that the track "accurately captures the energy of a boozy bar evening".

Other critics offered more mixed assessments. Steve Shymanik of PopMatters considered the song "bloated, bombastic, overdone, and too long", but nevertheless praised its "sheer ambition" and said that Gaga and the Stones "certainly can't be faulted for effort". Jem Aswad of Variety similarly praised "Sweet Sounds of Heaven" as one of the Stones' "best-ever soulful ballads", but argued that Gaga's contribution dragged the song down, acknowledging her impressive vocal range while criticizing her lack of nuance and describing her performance as "a master class in over-singing". Bob Lefsetz criticised the song's lyrics as substandard, but considered them secondary to its sound and emotional impact.

== Commercial performance ==
"Sweet Sounds of Heaven" peaked at number two on the UK Singles Sales Chart and number 15 on the UK Singles Downloads Chart. It also ranked 20 on the country's year-end vinyl singles chart for 2023. On national singles charts, the song reached number 42 in the Netherlands, 72 in Switzerland and 84 in Germany. In North America, it peaked at number 19 on the Canadian Digital Song Sales chart and number 29 on the US Billboard Digital Song Sales chart, as well as number 45 on the Hot Rock & Alternative Songs chart. Elsewhere, it reached number six on Billboard Japan's Hot Overseas chart, number 20 on Croatia's radio airplay chart and number 23 on New Zealand's Hot Singles chart.

== Live performances ==
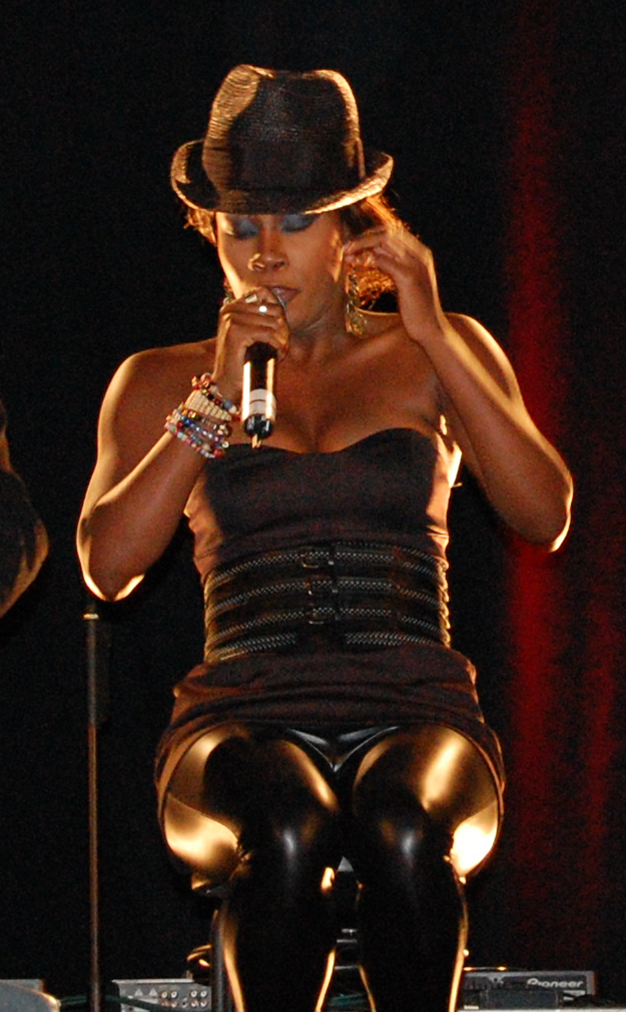
Chanel Haynes (pictured in 2009) performed Gaga's vocal parts during the Hackney Diamonds Tour (2024).

The Rolling Stones performed "Sweet Sounds of Heaven" live with Gaga for the first time on 19 October 2023, as the encore of a surprise seven-song concert celebrating the release of Hackney Diamonds at the 650-capacity Racket club in New York City. The set included songs from the new album, such as "Angry" and "Whole Wide World", alongside earlier hits, with "Sweet Sounds of Heaven" following "Jumpin' Jack Flash" as the closing number. Gaga, who had watched the preceding performances from the side of the stage, joined the band wearing a shimmering red-and-black outfit. Justin Curto of Vulture described Gaga's vocal exchanges with Mick Jagger as a "heavenly screaming match" and noted guitarist Ronnie Wood's enthusiastic playing during the song. Andy Greene of Rolling Stone praised how Gaga and Jagger propelled the song to "one soaring climax after another", calling their rendition an "impossible moment to top". A video of the performance was released on 26 October, followed by an audio release on digital and streaming services on 8 December.

"Sweet Sounds of Heaven" was performed at 17 of the 20 concerts on the Rolling Stones' Hackney Diamonds Tour (2024), usually opening the two-song encore before "(I Can't Get No) Satisfaction". Backing vocalist Chanel Haynes took over Gaga's parts, performing alongside Jagger. Drawing on her gospel background, Haynes described the song as a significant moment in the concerts and said she felt a responsibility to do justice to Gaga's original performance. Haynes's performances drew praise from critics at the Houston Chronicle, The Boston Globe, Los Angeles Times, and Chicago Sun-Times, who commended her powerful vocals and interpretation of Gaga's parts, with the latter's Selena Fragassi stating that she "nearly stole the show". In contrast, Jon Bream of the Minnesota Star Tribune criticised the song's performance at the tour's opening concert in Houston, arguing that Haynes's gospel-style delivery clashed with Jagger's more subdued singing. Reviewing the band's Denver concert, Emily Ferguson of Westword praised Jagger's energetic vocals and stage presence, as well as the blues-influenced guitar riffs and solos of Richards and Wood.

== Credits and personnel ==
Personnel adapted from Sweet Sounds of Heaven liner notes.

Recording locations

- Henson Recording Studios – Los Angeles, California
- Metropolis Studios – London, England
- Sanctuary Studios – Nassau, Bahamas

The Rolling Stones

- Mick Jagger – vocals, percussion
- Keith Richards – guitar
- Ronnie Wood – guitar

Additional musicians

- Lady Gaga – vocals
- Stevie Wonder – piano, Rhodes, Moog
- Steve Jordan – drums
- Matt Clifford – B3 organ
- Andrew Watt – bass, backing vocals
- James King – saxophone
- Ron Blake – trumpet

Technical personnel

- Andrew Watt – producer
- Serban Ghenea – mixer
- Bryce Bordone – mix assistant
- Matt Colton – mastering
- Paul LaMalfa – recording engineer
- Marco Sonzini – recording engineer
- Joe Dougherty – recording assistant
- Joe Brice – recording assistant
- Barnabas Poffley – recording assistant
- Kelsey Porter – recording assistant
- Tommy Turner – recording assistant
- Rich Evatt – recording assistant
- Pierre Beauport – studio assistant
- Marc Van Gool – studio assistant
- Brendan Morawski – studio assistant

== Charts ==
=== Weekly charts ===
Chart (2023)	Peak position
Canada Digital Songs (Billboard)	19
Croatia (HRT)	20
Germany (GfK)	84
Japan Hot Overseas (Billboard Japan)	6
Netherlands (Single Top 100)	42
Netherlands (Tipparade)	18
New Zealand Hot Singles (RMNZ)	23
Switzerland (Schweizer Hitparade)	72
UK Singles Sales (OCC)	2
UK Singles Downloads (OCC)	15
US Digital Song Sales (Billboard)	29
US Hot Rock & Alternative Songs (Billboard)	45

=== Year-end charts ===
Chart (2023)	Position
UK Vinyl Singles (OCC)	20

== Release history ==
Region	Date	Format(s)	Version(s)	Label	Ref.
Various	28 September 2023	Digital download; streaming	Edit; original	Polydor	
Italy	28 September 2023	Radio airplay	Original	Capitol	
Various	13 October 2023	10-inch vinyl; CD	Original	Polydor	
Japan	24 November 2023	SHM-CD	Original; edit	Polydor	
Various	8 December 2023	Digital download; streaming	Live at Racket, NYC	Polydor	
