= Sweet Love =

Sweet Love may refer to:

- Sweet Love (group), British girl group
- "Sweet Love" (Anita Baker song), 1986
- "Sweet Love" (Company of Strangers song), 1992
- "Sweet Love" (Chris Brown song), 2012
- "Sweet Love" (Commodores song), 1976
- "Sweet Love" (Junko Ohashi song), 1995
- "Sweet Love" (Stephen Sanchez song), 2026
- "Sweet Love", single by Zubeen Garg from the album Mukha, 2006
