= Hackney Diamonds =

- Standard edition cover

Studio album by the Rolling Stones
- Released: 20 October 2023
- Recorded: 2019–2023
- Studios: Electric Lady (New York City); The Hit Factory/Germano (New York City); Henson (Los Angeles); Metropolis (London); Sanctuary (Nassau)
- Genre: Blues rock
- Length: 48:23
- Labels: Polydor; Geffen
- Producer: Andrew Watt

The Rolling Stones chronology
Grrr Live! (2022)	Hackney Diamonds (2023)	Live at the Wiltern (2024)

The Rolling Stones studio album chronology
Blue & Lonesome (2016)	Hackney Diamonds (2023)	Foreign Tongues (2026)

Singles from Hackney Diamonds
- 1. "Angry" Released: 6 September 2023; 2. "Sweet Sounds of Heaven" Released: 28 September 2023; 3. "Mess It Up" Released: 20 October 2023

Hackney Diamonds is the twenty-fourth British and the twenty-sixth American studio album by the English rock band the Rolling Stones, released on 20 October 2023 on Polydor. It is the first album of original material by the Rolling Stones since 2005's A Bigger Bang and their first since the 2021 death of drummer Charlie Watts, who contributed to some tracks in 2019. Produced by Andrew Watt, it features guest contributions from Elton John, Lady Gaga, Paul McCartney, Stevie Wonder, and former Rolling Stones bassist Bill Wyman.

Hackney Diamonds received positive reviews, with some critics considering it the band's strongest album in decades. It was promoted by the singles "Angry", "Sweet Sounds of Heaven", and "Mess It Up". The album was backed by an extensive marketing campaign that included publicity stunts and merchandise, amongst other promotions.

Hackney Diamonds reached number one in 20 countries, including the UK, Austria, Australia, Greece, Argentina, the Netherlands and Germany. It was the 14th Rolling Stones album to top the UK Albums Chart, in its first week and again on 22 December, making it the first Rolling Stones Christmas number one album. It was certified gold in several countries and certified platinum in Austria, France, and Germany. The Rolling Stones embarked on the Hackney Diamonds Tour in support of the album in 2024. The album won the award for Best Rock Album at the 67th Annual Grammy Awards.

== Recording ==
"We had a lot of material recorded, but we weren't very excited with the results. Some of the songs were okay, but they weren't great. [Guitarist Keith Richards and I] said, 'We're going to work harder and we're going to set a deadline.' And that's when the magic started to happen. We recorded the whole thing in three or four weeks. We wanted to make the record fast and keep ourselves excited the whole time. And I think we achieved our goal."

— Vocalist Mick Jagger on recording Hackney Diamonds

The Rolling Stones had last released a studio album in 2016 with the blues covers album Blue & Lonesome whose sessions began with the band working on new original material recorded with Don Was but stalled. Some mitigating factors identified by guitarist Keith Richards include vocalist Mick Jagger's lack of enthusiasm for making new music and Richards being forced to adapt his playing style due to arthritis. Although the band had released their last album of original material, A Bigger Bang, in September 2005, they continued to release occasional tracks such as "Doom and Gloom" and "One More Shot" for the compilation GRRR! in 2012 and the 2020 single "Living in a Ghost Town" during the COVID-19 pandemic. For years, they toured, but when they met up as a group, it was only to rehearse for future performances, not record. The group again recorded sessions for a new album starting in 2020, but these were interrupted by the COVID-19 pandemic. Studio work in 2021 yielded several completed songs as well, but the band lost momentum and focus in the studio. Jagger was frustrated with the slow process of recording and proposed to Richards after their touring ended in August 2022 that they would choose 14 February 2023 as a due date for their new album. Richards credits drummer Charlie Watts's 2021 death as the impetus to become more serious about finishing an album's worth of material.

In mid-2022, Paul McCartney suggested producer Andrew Watt to guitarist Ronnie Wood to continue their work on an album and Jagger agreed, appreciating Watt's approach to producing new music from long-time acts. The band invited Watt to see them perform in Electric Lady Studios in late 2022 and he took over recording at Henson Recording Studios in Los Angeles by November of that year. Further recordings in late 2022 and early 2023 with Watt included McCartney playing bass guitar on two new Stones songs. Altogether, principal recording was about four weeks, followed by two weeks of overdubs, and Jagger's vocals recorded separately, only after the guitar work was finished. In June 2023, former bassist Bill Wyman announced that he had recorded with the band for the first time in 30 years based on a recommendation by Watt, and additional recordings with Elton John are included on the release. The album includes 2019 sessions that have the last studio work by Watts and the band's first studio work with drummer Steve Jordan. Final recording for the album began in December 2022, with 23 total tracks finished in January 2023 and mixing done in late February or early March. At the end, the band had enough material for a follow-up album, which vocalist Mick Jagger estimated was 75% done by the time that Hackney Diamonds was released. The recording process included multiple studios across the world and was captured by a documentary crew for the television special The Stones: Still Rolling.

News reports have indicated that the album's name is London slang for the shattered glass left behind after burglars have smashed a window to break in, Hackney being an inner-city area of London historically associated with a high crime rate. Richards stated it refers to broken glass left over in the morning after "a good Saturday night that went bad".

Long-time Stones bass guitarist Darryl Jones was reported to have worked on these sessions but does not appear on the final album, making Hackney Diamonds the first studio album since 1989's Steel Wheels not to feature any recorded contributions from him. Producer Watt handles most of the album’s bass parts, with Richards, Wood, and McCartney also contributing.

== Promotion and release ==
Paul Smith on the Rolling Stones x Paul Smith promotional campaign

Hackney Diamonds had been promoted with an extensive, worldwide advertising campaign coordinated by Universal Music Enterprises in London. On 17 August 2023, an advertisement appeared in the Hackney Gazette teasing the album, referencing several Rolling Stones song titles and displaying their tongue logo. On 22 August, social media profiles posted new artwork by Paulina Almira, and Universal Music Group debuted a website to promote the release, on which a countdown appeared and solicited questions for the band. The group posted links to the site on their social media accounts on 29 August and showed photos of their lip logo projected on various monuments around the world. These projections continued to 2 September, when the band previewed a short snippet of "Angry" on the website dontgetangrywithme.com, which experienced instability and frequent errors that some interpreted as being intentional.

On 4 September, the album was officially announced, as were the plans for a livestream with television host Jimmy Fallon where more information would be revealed and the lead single would be premiered. On 6 September, the livestream was broadcast on the Rolling Stones' official YouTube channel while being filmed at the Hackney Empire Theatre in London. Fallon interviewed the band, who revealed the album's track list and release date, as well as alluding to various guest musicians, and answered questions sent in from fans. The music video for "Angry" premiered after the interview concluded, which features actress Sydney Sweeney being driven through Los Angeles in a red convertible, with the band members singing to her from large billboards along the way.

"Sweet Sounds of Heaven" was teased by the band via an Instagram post on 25 September 2023, which played a short snippet of the track and revealed its release date; the single was released three days later. In early October, a fashion line designed by Paul Smith was announced that would promote the album, and retail stores in London and Tokyo opened to sell Rolling Stones merchandise ahead of the album. The single "Mess It Up" also came out in October.

Shortly after the newspaper advertisement implying the album release, 12 songs were registered to the American Society of Composers, Authors and Publishers under the names of Jagger–Richards, with three tracks co-written by Andrew Watt. The final track listing was released on 6 September and included "Rolling Stone Blues", a Muddy Waters song that gave their band their name; they had never covered it previously on a release and this was the sole recording for this album recorded to tape. It was also one of the songs that Jagger and Richards bonded over when connecting as youths, when Richards spotted Jagger carrying a copy of The Best of Muddy Waters on a train.

The limited edition vinyl LP cover art has a mass of eyeballs and tongues, and a retailer-exclusive edition has the cracked diamond heart surrounded by red limbs. Additional covers are made for every Major League Baseball team, featuring the tongue and lips logo in each team's colors and a limited edition by KidSuper featuring the lips logo with red fingerprints around it. The day before the album release, FC Barcelona announced a special version of their home kit designed to promote it, which was worn by the men's team in the home Clásico against Real Madrid on 28 October and the women's team in the match against Sevilla one week later.

As the release date drew near, the band began rehearsing for a supporting tour, and raised the possibility of virtual reality avatars for future performances. While no tour dates were announced by the time of the album release, the band played a seven-song set on 19 October 2023 at the 650-capacity Racket (fka Highline Ballroom) in New York City with Lady Gaga as they made promotional television appearances. The Rolling Stones are due to tour in support of the album in 2024.

On 15 December 2023, The Rolling Stones released via Polydor an expanded live edition of Hackney Diamonds. The limited edition 2CD version includes the standard album on CD 1 paired with Live at Racket, NYC on CD 2 which features the seven tracks the band performed at the launch event on 19 October 2023 at the Racket in New York, including debut live performances of "Angry", "Bite My Head Off", "Whole Wide World" and "Sweet Sounds of Heaven" (the latter song with Lady Gaga). Also included is a 24-page booklet with photos from the performance by Kevin Mazur.

== Critical reception ==
Professional ratings
Aggregate scores
Source	Rating
AnyDecentMusic?	7.7/10
Metacritic	78/100
Review scores
Source	Rating
AllMusic	3.5/5 stars
The Daily Telegraph	5/5 stars
Evening Standard	4/5 stars
Financial Times	4/5 stars
The Independent	4/5 stars
Irish Examiner	4/5 stars
Irish Times	4/5 stars
Pitchfork	4.5/10
The Scotsman	4/5 stars
The Times	5/5 stars

According to the review aggregator Metacritic, Hackney Diamonds received "generally favorable reviews" based on a weighted average score of 78 out of 100 from 14 critic scores. Several critics have declared this the band's best album in decades. Most assessments of the album are positive, aside from a negative review published by Pitchfork.

Classic Rock's Ian Fortnam rated the album 4.5 out of 5 stars, stating "[the band] haven't delivered an album this quintessentially Stonesy in 40 years ... [this one] only ever leaves the listener hungry for more". Neil McCormick of The Daily Telegraph gave this album 5 out of 5 stars, characterizing it as "a raucous and dirty modern rock classic" and that the band is as good as they were in the 1970s. Alexis Petridis of The Guardian gave this album 4 out of 5 stars and credited Andrew Watt by writing that the music "suggest[s] the presence of someone who knows how to make contemporary hits, and there's a light modern sheen to the production that prevents it sounding like a determined recreation of the Stones' past". In The Independent, Mark Beaumont scored Hackney Diamonds 4 out of 5 stars, opining that the band's guitarists sound young and vital, and the combination of older pop musician guest stars makes this release have "a sense of career closure".

NME's Alex Flood gave the album 4 out of 5 stars, calling it "an absolute barnstormer" that is "very enjoyable". Will Hodgkinson of The Times noted that Hackney Diamonds "sound[s] like a summation of all the things that make the Stones great" and is "unquestionably the Stones' best [album] since [1978's] Some Girls". Hodgkinson gave Hackney Diamonds 5 out of 5 stars, calling it "a joy from beginning to end" and praising its modern sound. Sister publication The Sunday Times featured a track-by-track break-down by Dan Cairns, drawing parallels with many releases in the band's catalogue, particularly from the 1970s. AllMusic's Stephen Thomas Erlewine, in a 3.5 out of 5 review, wrote "at its heart, it's nothing more than the Rolling Stones knocking out some good Rolling Stones songs, which seems like a minor miracle after such a long wait".

In The Australian's The Front, Claire Harvey characterized this album as "astoundingly good", particularly for being so late in the band's career. Jonah Kreuger of Consequence considers this the third in a series of albums that return to the band's blues rock roots with music that is "solid, if inessential", he also criticizes the "uncanny sleekness" of the recording and recommends that the band's music would sound better with less studio polish, but also notes that there is "genuine excitement on a few choice cuts". Daniel Sylvester of Exclaim! gave this album a 7 out of 10, stating that the band are "better than they need to be ... while many of these tracks come off like they were focus-grouped to sound like classic Rolling Stones, they nonetheless hit their desired mark". Guitar World's Jackson Maxwell praised the interplay between guitarists Keith Richards and Ronnie Wood, as well as Richards' choice of vintage musical gear for recording; he assessed it the band's finest guitar work in decades. Mikeal Wood of the Los Angeles Times called the music "punchier" and catchier than recent releases.

A negative review came from Grayson Haver Currin of Pitchfork, rating the album 4.5 out of 10, stating that "these titans of industry flail as they try to act their image rather than their age" and stating that some tracks "sound ... like the Eagles trying to be bland" and "like an advertisement for advertising placements, songs meant to be sold to sell something else". David Browne of Rolling Stone called it an album "worthy of multiple listens" and praised Steve Jordan's drumming as well as the fact that the band has relevant lyrics without "the late-in-life introspection heard on recent records by some of the Stones’ peers". Ultimate Classic Rock stated "[after Blue & Lonesome] the band have both nothing and, for the first time in decades, something to prove" and "they step up for the occasion, delivering their most committed set of songs and performances in years". Variety called this the band's "liveliest work in 40 years", crediting producer Andrew Watt, as well as the band's guitarists.

=== Accolades ===
Hackney Diamonds in lists and rankings
Outlet	Listing	Rank
The A.V. Club	The 27 best albums of 2023	27
AllMusic	Favorite Rock Albums	unranked
Associated Press	Best albums of 2023	unranked, 12 best albums
BrooklynVegan	33 great 2023 albums from indie / alternative legends	unranked
Classic Rock	The 50 best rock albums of 2023	1
Classic Rock (Joe Daly)	10 favourite albums of 2023	2
Loudwire	The 25 Best Rock + Metal Albums of 2023	unranked
The New Zealand Herald (Graham Reid)	best albums of 2023	unranked
NME	The best albums of 2023	43 out of 50
Paste	The 30 Best Rock Albums of 2023	unranked
Qobuz Magazine	The Best Albums of 2023 (Rock)	unranked, out of 5
Rolling Stone	The 100 Best Albums of 2023	65 out of 100
Spin	Every Rolling Stones Album, Ranked	17 out of 24
Uncut	75 best new albums	18 out of 75

== Track listing ==
All tracks are written by Jagger–Richards, except where noted.

Hackney Diamonds track listing
No.	Title	Writer(s)	Length
1.	"Angry"	Jagger–Richards, Andrew Watt	3:46
2.	"Get Close"	Jagger–Richards, Watt	4:10
3.	"Depending on You"	Jagger–Richards, Watt	4:03
4.	"Bite My Head Off"		3:31
5.	"Whole Wide World"		3:58
6.	"Dreamy Skies"		4:38
7.	"Mess It Up"		4:03
8.	"Live by the Sword"		3:59
9.	"Driving Me Too Hard"		3:16
10.	"Tell Me Straight"		2:56
11.	"Sweet Sounds of Heaven" (featuring Lady Gaga)		7:22
12.	"Rolling Stone Blues"	Muddy Waters	2:41
Total length:			48:23

== Personnel ==
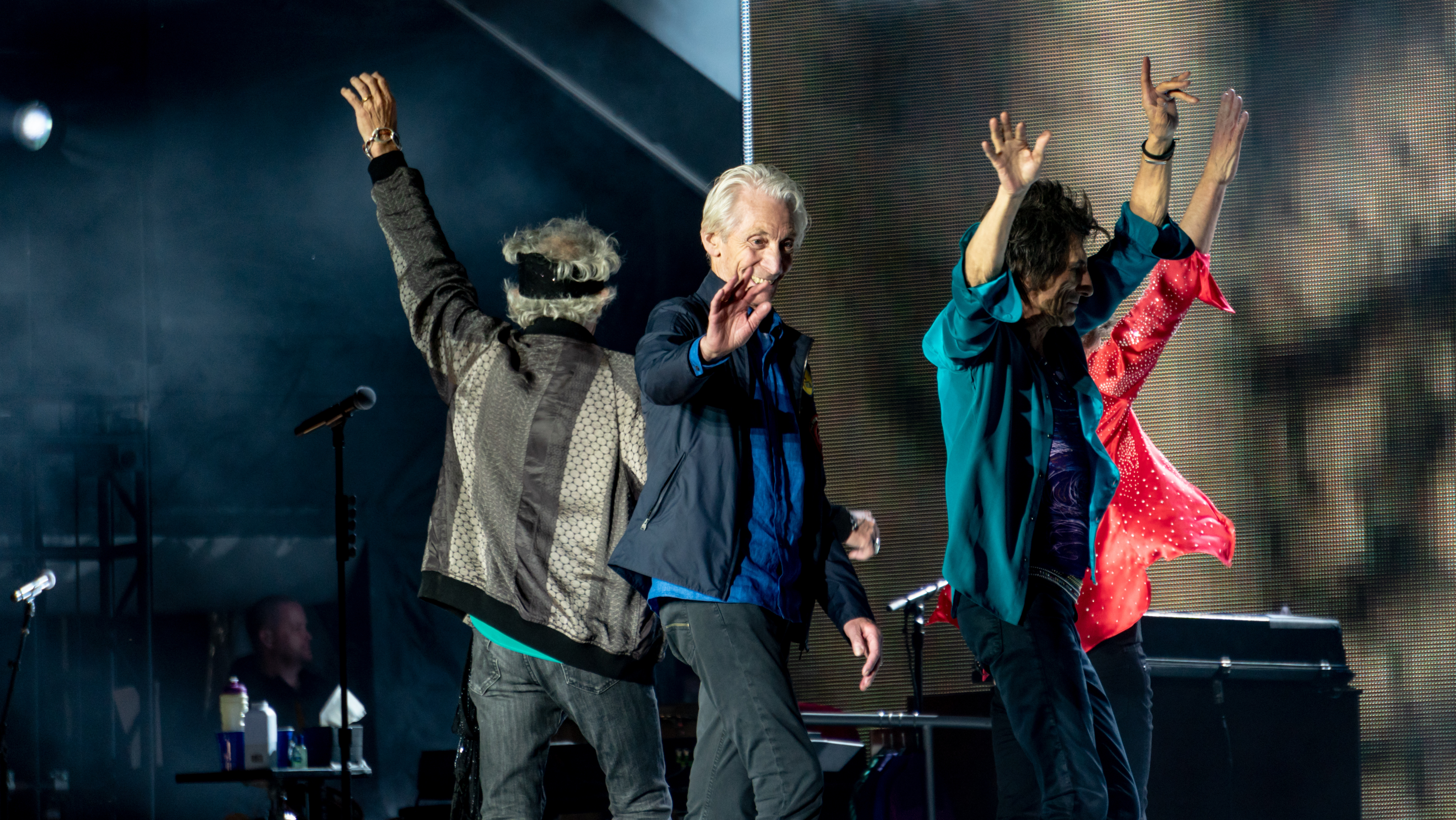
Drummer Charlie Watts (centre) with the Rolling Stones in 2018, months before his final studio sessions.

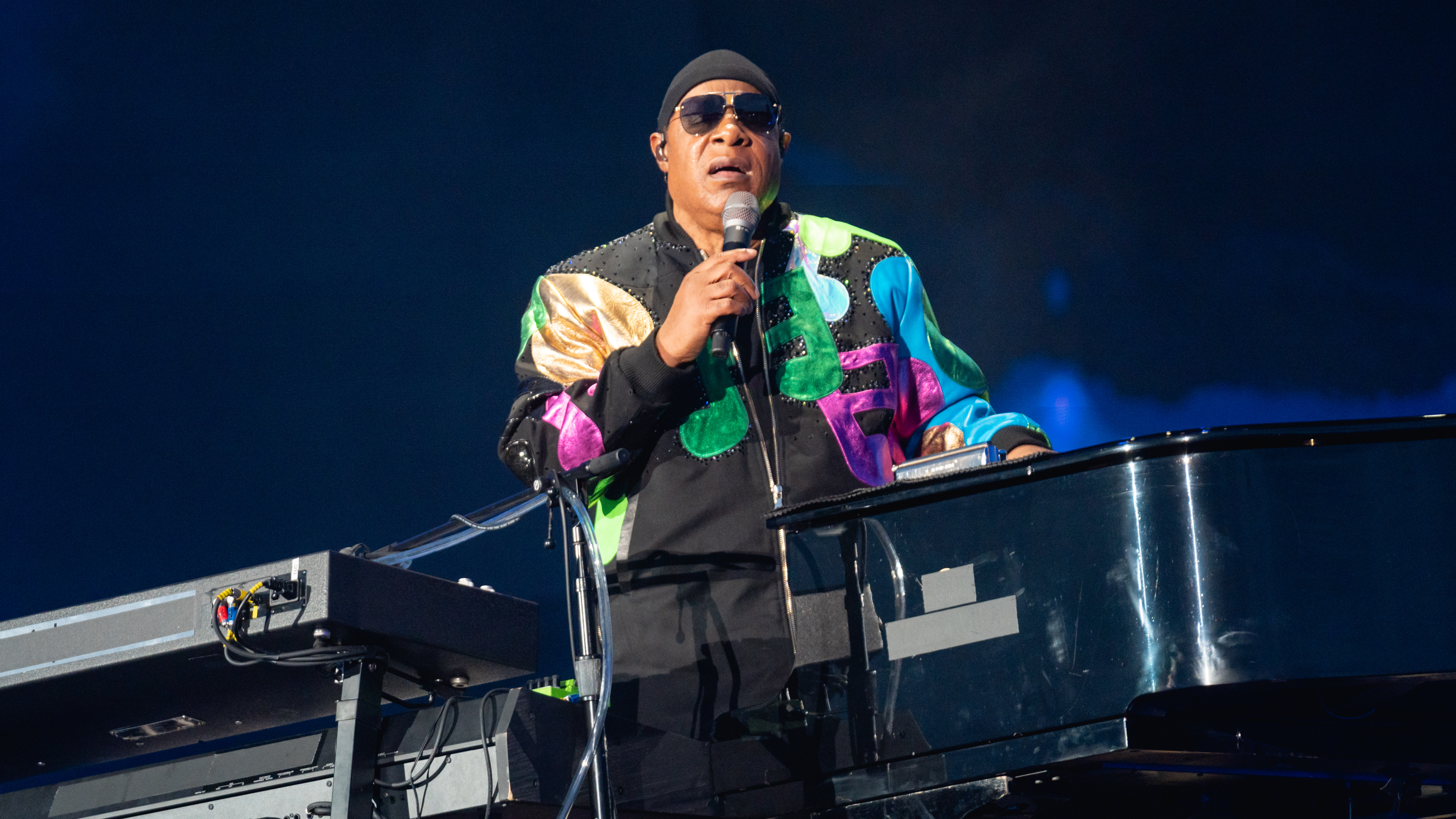
Stevie Wonder guests on piano on the track "Sweet Sounds of Heaven".

Credits adapted from the album's liner notes.

The Rolling Stones

- Mick Jagger – lead vocals (except "Tell Me Straight"); backing vocals (except "Driving Me Too Hard", "Rolling Stone Blues"); guitar (except "Rolling Stone Blues"); percussion (except "Rolling Stone Blues"); harmonica on "Dreamy Skies", "Rolling Stone Blues"
- Keith Richards – guitar; backing vocals on "Angry", "Get Close", "Depending on You", "Dreamy Skies", "Driving Me Too Hard", "Sweet Sounds of Heaven"; bass on "Angry", "Get Close", "Dreamy Skies", "Tell It To Me Straight", "Sweet Sounds of Heaven"; piano on "Driving Me Too Hard"; lead vocals on "Tell Me Straight"
- Ronnie Wood – guitar (except "Rolling Stone Blues"); bass on "Driving Me Too Hard"; backing vocals on "Angry", "Get Close", "Depending on You", "Dreamy Skies", "Live By the Sword", "Tell It To Me Straight", "Sweet Sounds of Heaven"
- Charlie Watts – drums on "Mess It Up" and "Live by the Sword"

Additional musicians

- Charlie Bisharat – violin on "Depending on You"
- Ron Blake – trumpet on "Get Close" and "Sweet Sounds of Heaven"
- Jacob Braun – cello on "Depending on You"
- David Campbell – string arrangement on "Depending on You"
- Matt Clifford – piano on "Angry", "Depending on You", "Bite My Head Off", "Whole Wide World", "Dreamy Skies", "Mess It Up", "Driving Me Too Hard"; keyboards on "Whole Wide World" and "Mess It Up"; Wurlitzer electric piano on "Get Close" and "Mess It Up"; Rhodes electric piano on "Whole Wide World", "Dreamy Skies", "Driving Me Too Hard", "Tell Me Straight"; organ on "Driving Me Too Hard"; Hammond B3 organ on "Sweet Sounds of Heaven"
- Karlos Edwards – percussion on "Mess It Up"
- Paula Hochhalter – cello on "Depending on You"
- Elton John – piano on "Get Close" and "Live by the Sword"
- Steve Jordan – drums (all tracks except "Mess It Up", "Live by the Sword" and "Rolling Stone Blues")
- James King – saxophone on "Get Close" and "Sweet Sounds of Heaven"
- Lady Gaga – vocals on "Sweet Sounds of Heaven"
- Tom Lea – viola on "Depending on You"
- Songa Lee – violin on "Depending on You"
- Luke Maurer – viola on "Depending on You"
- Paul McCartney – bass on "Bite My Head Off"
- Alyssa Park – violin on "Depending on You"
- Sara Parkins – violin on "Depending on You"
- Michele Richards – violin on "Depending on You"
- Tereza Stanislav – violin on "Depending on You"
- Jennifer Takamatsu – violin on "Depending on You"
- Benmont Tench – Hammond organ on "Depending on You" and "Dreamy Skies"
- Philip Vaiman – violin on "Depending on You"
- Andrew Watt – bass on "Get Close", "Depending on You", "Whole Wide World", "Mess It Up", and "Sweet Sounds of Heaven"; guitar on "Depending on You" and "Mess It Up"; keyboards on "Mess It Up"; backing vocals on "Angry", "Get Close", "Depending on You", "Whole Wide World", "Driving Me Too Hard", and "Sweet Sounds of Heaven"; percussion on "Angry", "Depending on You", "Whole Wide World", and "Driving Me Too Hard"; string arrangements on "Depending on You"
- Stevie Wonder – piano, Rhodes electric piano, Moog synthesiser (all on "Sweet Sounds of Heaven")
- Bill Wyman – bass on "Live by the Sword"

Production and technical staff

- Paulina Almira – illustration
- Matt Colton – mastering at Metropolis Studios
- Matt Clifford – vocal engineering and recording ("Live by the Sword")
- Serban Ghenea – mixing at MixMaster Studios, Virginia Beach, Virginia, United States (except "Rolling Stone Blues")
- Paul Lamalfa – mixing on "Rolling Stone Blues"
- Studio Fury – art direction and design
- Pierre de Beauport – guitar technician, crew chief, studio assistant
- Marc VanGool – guitar technician, studio assistance
- Trace Foster – guitar technician, studio assistant
- Don McAulay – drum and percussion technician, studio assistant
- Don Was – drum recording and production ("Live by the Sword")
- Andrew Watt – producer, mixing on "Rolling Stone Blues"

== Charts ==
=== Weekly charts ===
Weekly chart performance for Hackney Diamonds
Chart (2023)	Peak position
Argentine Albums (CAPIF)	1
Australian Albums (ARIA)	1
Austrian Albums (Ö3 Austria)	1
Belgian Albums (Ultratop Flanders)	1
Belgian Albums (Ultratop Wallonia)	1
Canadian Albums (Billboard)	8
Croatian International Albums (HDU)	1
Czech Albums (ČNS IFPI)	2
Danish Albums (Hitlisten)	1
Dutch Albums (Album Top 100)	1
Finnish Albums (Suomen virallinen lista)	3
French Albums (SNEP)	1
German Albums (Offizielle Top 100)	1
Greek Albums (IFPI Greece)	1
Hungarian Albums (MAHASZ)	8
Icelandic Albums (Tónlistinn)	1
Irish Albums (Official Charts)	1
Italian Albums (FIMI)	2
Japanese Albums (Oricon)	5
Japanese Combined Albums (Oricon)	5
Japanese Hot Albums (Billboard Japan)	4
Lithuanian Albums (AGATA)	68
New Zealand Albums (RMNZ)	1
Norwegian Albums (VG-lista)	1
Polish Albums (ZPAV)	3
Portuguese Albums (AFP)	1
Scottish Albums (Official Charts)	1
Slovak Albums (ČNS IFPI)	11
Spanish Albums (Promusicae)	2
Swedish Albums (Sverigetopplistan)	1
Swiss Albums (Schweizer Hitparade)	1
UK Albums (Official Charts)	1
US Billboard 200	3
US Top Rock Albums (Billboard)	2

=== Year-end charts ===
2023 year-end chart performance for Hackney Diamonds
Chart (2023)	Position
Austrian Albums (Ö3 Austria)	1
Belgian Albums (Ultratop Flanders)	12
Belgian Albums (Ultratop Wallonia)	17
Dutch Albums (Album Top 100)	1
French Albums (SNEP)	20
German Albums (Offizielle Top 100)	1
Polish Albums (ZPAV)	46
Spanish Albums (PROMUSICAE)	51
Swiss Albums (Schweizer Hitparade)	1
UK Albums (OCC)	27

2024 year-end chart performance of Hackney Diamonds
Chart (2024)	Position
Austrian Albums (Ö3 Austria)	39
Croatian International Albums (HDU)	29
German Albums (Offizielle Top 100)	17
Swiss Albums (Schweizer Hitparade)	58

== Certifications and sales ==
Hackney Diamonds certifications
Region	Certification	Certified units/sales
Austria (IFPI Austria)	Platinum	15,000^{‡}
France (SNEP)	Platinum	100,000^{‡}
Germany (BVMI)	Platinum	150,000^{‡}
Italy (FIMI)	Gold	25,000^{‡}
Netherlands (NVPI)	Platinum	37,200^{‡}
Poland (ZPAV)	Gold	10,000^{‡}
Spain (Promusicae)	Gold	20,000^{‡}
Switzerland (IFPI Switzerland)	Gold	10,000^{‡}
United Kingdom (BPI)	Gold	100,000^{‡}
^{‡} Sales+streaming figures based on certification alone.

== Accolades ==
Hackney Diamonds won the award for Best Rock Album at the 67th Annual Grammy Awards.

== Release history ==
Release formats for Hackney Diamonds
Date	Label	Format	Catalogue number
20 October 2023	Polydor	LP (of 43 variants)	554 645–5
20 October 2023	Polydor	LP sports teams	5840131
20 October 2023	Polydor	LP alternate artwork	554 645–9
20 October 2023	Polydor	Compact disc digipack	581 225–5
20 October 2023	Polydor	CD, Blu-ray lenticular limited edition	581 225–4
20 October 2023	Polydor	LP green, Amazon.com exclusive	554 646–2
15 December 2023	Polydor	CD, live expanded edition	588 029–6

== See also ==
- 2023 in British music
- 2023 in rock music
- List of 2023 albums
