= Hackney Diamonds Tour =

2024 concert tour by the Rolling Stones

- Continental tour by The Rolling Stones
- Location: North America
- Associated album: Hackney Diamonds
- Start date: 28 April 2024
- End date: 21 July 2024
- Legs: 1
- No. of shows: 20
- Attendance: 848,000
- Box office: $235,000,000

The Rolling Stones concert chronology
- Sixty (2022); Hackney Diamonds Tour (2024)

The Hackney Diamonds Tour was a concert tour by English rock band the Rolling Stones, in support of their 2023 studio album Hackney Diamonds, their first studio album of original material in 18 years. The shows were sponsored by the AARP, an American non-profit that represents the interests of those over the age of fifty. The tour grossed $235,000,000 with 848,000 tickets sold.

== Promotion ==
The Stones teamed up with Roblox to introduce the group to the Universal Music Group virtual Roblox world "Beat Galaxy". Players could participate in interactive games featuring the band's songs and obtain "exclusive virtual...merchandise". “Bringing our music to the virtual world of Beat Galaxy is an innovative way to connect with our new and existing fans,” the band said in a statement.

== Reception ==
=== Tour gross ===
Mick Jagger dancing to the crowd at the inaugural date for the Hackney Diamonds Tour

According to Billboard Boxscore, the tour earned $235 million and sold 848,000 tickets. Billboard stated that "every market on the tour delivered an eight-figure gross, with the lone exception of Glendale, Arizona". They also further noted that this is their "sixth tour to earn more than $200 million and tenth to gross more than $100 million".

=== Reviews ===
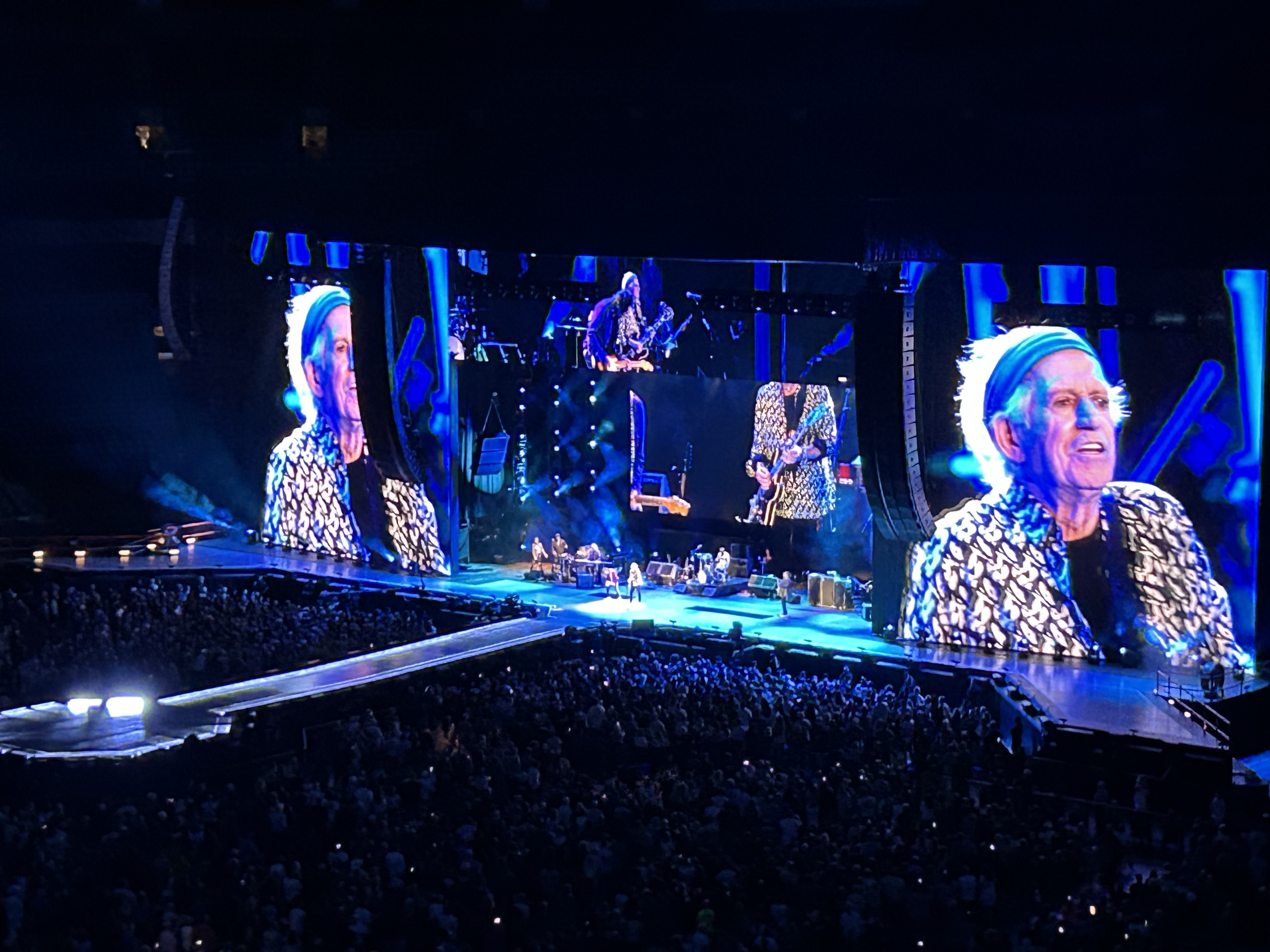
The Rolling Stones performing "Little T & A" on July 5, 2024 at BC Place in Vancouver

In her review for their first performance at NRG Stadium, Melissa Ruggieri of USA Today said that "while the band needed a couple of songs to fully find their groove – the striding cadence of a reworked "Get Off Of My Cloud" and a ramshackle "Rocks Off" felt curious rather than robust – Jagger compensated with his riveting presence and still-supple vocals". She also opined that "this is still Jagger's circus, and whether he’s bobbing like a jittery prizefighter or wiggling his shoulders like the world's most slender Chippendales dancer, he is an octogenarian who captivates".

In May, at their performance at MetLife Stadium, The New York Times Lindsay Zoladz praised the "core trio", stating; "Ronnie Wood still shreds on the guitar with a grinning, impish verve ... and eternally cool Keith Richards pairs his bluesy licks with a humble demeanor that seems to say 'I can’t believe I’m still here, either' ... and Jagger is somehow still the indefatigable dynamo he always was, slithering vertically like a charmed snake, chopping the air as if he’s in a kung fu battle against a swarm of unseen mosquitoes". She also noted that "Jagger, Richards and Wood all still emanate a palpable joy for what they are doing onstage ... but those joys also feel noticeably personal and siloed, rarely blending to provide much intra-band chemistry".

Todd Inoue of The San Francisco Chronicle applauded their performance at their July leg of the tour in Santa Clara. He declared that "as one of the world's greatest bands, the Stones remain a comforting thread in the fabric of life ... the extended warranty on their steel wheels expired long ago ... but the Stones continue to chug along, proving they still have a lot of gas-gas-gas left in the tank". He stated "it was clear the stadium is where Mick Jagger thrives, and his voice sounded strong and well-preserved ... Wood assumed the bulk of the lead guitar duties while Richards lent burnished rhythmic touches, eliciting a roar of recognition during famous intro riffs".

At the final performance of their North American tour at Thunder Ridge Nature Arena in Ridgedale, Andy Greene from Rolling Stone commented "there were no huge surprises in the setlist, but it was a rare show that featured both "Whole Wide World" and "Mess It Up" from Hackney Diamonds ... and "Angry" was the only song from their new album they broke out all 20 nights of the tour". Greene said "Let It Bleed" won the fan vote, and also noted that "Richards had some brief guitar issues before "Paint It Black", forcing him to swap in a new instrument while Ron Wood and Steve Jordan killed time with a quick jam".

Matt Friedlander of American Songwriter said the July 21 show in Ridgedale, which was the 20th show of the tour, included a performance of the band’s classic 1968 song "Street Fighting Man", which was played only one other time on the tour, at the concert in Vancouver, Canada". He also observed that after the end of the tour, Jagger and Wood posted messages to Instagram which "seemed to hint that The Stones may be planning more shows", while the band posted on their Instagram account:

That’s a wrap on the Stones Tour ’24! A huge thank you to everyone that has come to see a show! And special thanks to all the outstanding musicians that join the Stones onstage, plus every crew member that works so hard to make this happen.

== Set list ==
The following set list was performed at the concert held at NRG Stadium in Houston, on 28 April 2024.

1. "Start Me Up"
2. "Get Off of My Cloud"
3. "Rocks Off"
4. "Out of Time"
5. "Angry"
6. "Beast of Burden"
7. "Mess It Up"
8. "Tumbling Dice"
9. "You Can't Always Get What You Want"
10. "Little T & A"
11. "Sympathy for the Devil"
12. "Gimme Shelter"
13. "Honky Tonk Women"
14. "Miss You"
15. "Paint It Black"
16. "Jumpin' Jack Flash"

Encore

17. "Sweet Sounds of Heaven"
18. "(I Can't Get No) Satisfaction"

== Tour dates ==
List of 2024 concerts
| Date (2024) | City | Country | Venue | Opening act(s) |
|---|---|---|---|---|
| 28 April | Houston | United States | NRG Stadium | Gary Clark Jr |
| 2 May (Note: Part of New Orleans Jazz & Heritage Festival.) | New Orleans | United States | Fair Grounds Race Course | —N/a |
| 7 May | Glendale | United States | State Farm Stadium | Carín León; Electric Mud |
| 11 May | Paradise (Note: Billed as Las Vegas in promotional material.) | United States | Allegiant Stadium | The Pretty Reckless |
| 15 May | Seattle | United States | Lumen Field | Joe Bonamassa |
| 23 May | East Rutherford | United States | MetLife Stadium | Jon Batiste |
| 26 May | East Rutherford | United States | MetLife Stadium | Lawrence |
| 30 May | Foxborough | United States | Gillette Stadium | The Red Clay Strays |
| 3 June | Orlando | United States | Camping World Stadium | Tyler Childers |
| 7 June | Atlanta | United States | Mercedes-Benz Stadium | Ghost Hounds |
| 11 June | Philadelphia | United States | Lincoln Financial Field | Kaleo |
| 15 June | Cleveland | United States | Cleveland Browns Stadium | Ghost Hounds |
| 20 June | Denver | United States | Empower Field at Mile High | Widespread Panic |
| 27 June | Chicago | United States | Soldier Field | Bettye LaVette |
| 30 June | Chicago | United States | Soldier Field | Lainey Wilson |
| 5 July | Vancouver | Canada | BC Place | Ghost Hounds |
| 10 July | Inglewood (Note: Billed as Los Angeles in promotional material.) | United States | SoFi Stadium | The War and Treaty |
| 13 July | Inglewood | United States | SoFi Stadium | The Linda Lindas |
| 17 July | Santa Clara | United States | Levi's Stadium | The Beaches |
| 21 July | Ridgedale | United States | Thunder Ridge Nature Arena | Samantha Fish |

== Personnel ==
Personnel adapted from USA Today.

The Rolling Stones

- Mick Jagger – lead vocals, guitar, harmonica, percussion
- Keith Richards – guitars, backing and lead vocals
- Ronnie Wood – guitars, backing vocals

Additional musicians

- Darryl Jones – bass guitar
- Karl Denson – saxophone
- Tim Ries – saxophone, keyboards
- Matt Clifford – keyboards, percussion, French horn
- Chuck Leavell – keyboards, backing vocals
- Chanelle Haynes – backing vocals
- Bernard Fowler – backing vocals, percussion
- Steve Jordan – drums

== See also ==
- List of the Rolling Stones concert tours
- List of songs recorded by the Rolling Stones
