= Angry (Rolling Stones song) =

Single by the Rolling Stones

from the album Hackney Diamonds
- Released: 6 September 2023
- Genre: Hard rock
- Length: 3:46
- Songwriters: Mick Jagger; Keith Richards; Andrew Watt
- Producer: Andrew Watt

The Rolling Stones singles chronology
"Troubles a' Comin" (2021)	"Angry" (2023)	"Sweet Sounds of Heaven" (2023)

Music video
- "Angry" on YouTube

"Angry" is a song by British rock band the Rolling Stones, which serves as the lead single from their studio album Hackney Diamonds. Released on 6 September 2023, it is the first new original music from the band in three years (following the non-album single "Living in a Ghost Town" in 2020), whilst Hackney Diamonds is their first album of new original music in 18 years (following A Bigger Bang in 2005). This song is included in the soundtrack for EA Sports FC 24.

== Release and promotion ==
On 2 September 2023 – following a couple weeks of cryptic online teasers for the new album – the band previewed a short snippet of "Angry" on the website dontgetangrywithme.com, which experienced instability and frequent errors that some interpreted as being intentional. On 4 September, the album was officially announced, as were the plans for a livestream with television host Jimmy Fallon where more information would be revealed and the lead single would be premiered. On 6 September, the livestream was broadcast on the Rolling Stones' official YouTube channel while being filmed at the Hackney Empire Theatre in London. Fallon interviewed the band, who revealed the album's track list and release date and also answered various questions sent in from fans.

== Music video ==
The music video for "Angry" premiered on 6 September, at the Rolling Stones' official YouTube channel, accompanying their promotional interview with Jimmy Fallon. The video features actress Sydney Sweeney, dressed in black studded chaps and dancing in the back seat of a red Mercedes 560 SL convertible as it is driven down the Sunset Strip in Los Angeles while the band members sing to her from large billboards that the car passes. The video was met with criticism that it objectified Sweeney, but she defended it as "empowerment through embracing [my] body".

== Reception ==
"Angry" was met with primarily positive reviews. A review from The Telegraph rated the song 5 out of 5 stars, calling it the band's "best single in four decades, an absolute blast [with] extravagant, leering defiance"; describing the riff as "defiantly dumb", the guitar solo as "gnarly", and the overall style as "unapologetically old-fashioned". Another 5-star review from The i Paper shares this positive sentiment, characterising the song as "rollicking, rip-roaring rock 'n' roll" with a "characteristically big, confident guitar riff [and] catchy refrain" that are "[imbued with] feeling and life". A 4-star review from The Guardian also echoes this praise, citing the band's ability to "cleverly wax and wane from minor to major chords, carrying [a] tale of alternating desperation and resignation" while also making the track "a complete hoot [that] suggests fun, freedom, and creative hunger". Alternatively, a review from Far Out offered a dissenting opinion and rated the song 2.5 out of 5 stars, criticising the song as "distinctly average" and "Stones-by-numbers", further stating that it makes use of "the same borrowed and rather tired blues riff" and that it "aims to thrill but merely titillates".

This was named the best rock song of 2023 by Ultimate Classic Rock.

In the US, although the song did not chart on the Billboard Hot 100, "Angry" was nominated for the Grammy Award for Best Rock Song at the 66th Annual Grammy Awards.

== Personnel ==
Personnel taken from Angry liner notes.

The Rolling Stones

- Mick Jagger – vocals, guitar, percussion
- Keith Richards – guitar, bass
- Ronnie Wood – guitar

Additional musicians

- Steve Jordan – drums
- Matt Clifford – piano
- Andrew Watt – backing vocals, percussion

Technical personnel

- Andrew Watt – producer
- Serban Ghenea – mixer
- Bryce Bordone – mix assistant
- Matt Colton – mastering
- Paul LaMalfa – recording engineer
- Marco Sonzini – recording engineer
- Joe Dougherty – recording assistant
- Kelsey Porter – recording assistant
- Tommy Turner – recording assistant
- Pierre Beauport – studio assistant
- Marc VanGool – studio assistant

== Charts ==
=== Weekly charts ===
Chart (2023–24)	Peak position
Austria (Ö3 Austria Top 40)	38
Belgium (Ultratop 50 Flanders)	32
Croatia (HRT)	9
Czech Republic Airplay (ČNS IFPI)	100
France (SNEP)	144
Germany (GfK)	21
Japan (Japan Hot 100)	66
Latvia Airplay (LAIPA)	16
Netherlands (Single Top 100)	34
Netherlands (Tipparade)	9
New Zealand Hot Singles (RMNZ)	11
Slovakia Airplay (ČNS IFPI)	88
South Korea BGM (Circle)	153
Sweden Heatseeker (Sverigetopplistan)	4
Switzerland (Schweizer Hitparade)	42
UK Singles (Official Charts)	34
UK Singles Sales (OCC)	1
UK Physical Singles (OCC)	1
UK Vinyl Singles (OCC)	1
UK Singles Downloads (OCC)	6
UK Singles Update (OCC)	29
US Hot Rock & Alternative Songs (Billboard)	32
US Rock & Alternative Airplay (Billboard)	14

=== Monthly charts ===
Chart (2023)	Peak position
Paraguay (SGP)	37

=== Year-end charts ===
Chart (2023)	Position
UK Vinyl Singles (OCC)	4
