= Shireland CBSO Academy =

Location
- 1 Providence Place; West Bromwich, West Midlands; England
- Coordinates: 52.5229°N 1.9944°W

Information
- Type: Free school
- Established: 2023
- Trust: Shireland Collegiate Academy Trust
- Department for Education URN: 149962 Tables
- Ofsted: Reports
- Principal: David Green
- Gender: Coeducational
- Age: 11 to 19
- Website: https://shirelandcbso.org.uk/

The Shireland CBSO Academy is an English free school in West Bromwich, West Midlands that was established in 2023. The school, which opened on 5 September, is the first school in the UK to be partnered with a professional orchestra. In collaboration with the City of Birmingham Symphony Orchestra, the school will offer pupils weekly workshops, performances and masterclasses, as well as free instrumental tuition for at least two years. Shireland opened with its first intake of 138 Year Seven pupils on 5 September, with plans for more to join.
