= Girl Group (band) =

British girl group

- Origin: Liverpool, England
- Genres: Indie pop
- Years active: 2023–present
- Members: Katya Birkeland; Lily Christlow; Thea Gundersen; Mia Halvorsen; Maria Tollisen

Girl Group are a British-Norwegian band based in Liverpool, consisting of members Katya Birkeland, Lily Christlow, Thea Gundersen, Mia Halvorsen and Maria Tollisen. After becoming friends whilst attending the Liverpool Institute for Performing Arts, they made their debut in 2023. They have since released the extended plays Think They're Looking, Let's Perform in 2025 and Little Sticky Pictures in 2026.

== History ==
Four of Girl Group's members are Norwegian: Katya Birkeland, Thea Gundersen, Mia Halvorsen and Maria Tollisen, while member Lily Christlow is from Bridlington, Yorkshire. They all met each other whilst attending the Liverpool Institute for Performing Arts. Halvorsen and Tollisen knew each other from Oslo, and eventually, the five women all became friends. Six months later, they began to make music together. They were annoyed that men in their classes would all hire out the studios and not involve them, or occasionally invite them and ask them to stay quiet and not contribute.

Before choosing Girl Group as their band name, they also considered Pop Tarts, Floor Snacks and Rodney's Angels. Explaining the choice, they said it expresses "so perfectly what we are, everything that we do is centred around women but then also that sense of playfulness and togetherness". They have said that it was initially difficult to agree on a collective sound for the group, but eventually agreed that their common interest was Wet Leg. Their debut single, "Life is Dumb", released in 2023, was inspired by Wet Leg's "Being in Love". Tollisen co-produces the majority of their music. Their second single, "Lil's Room", was released in 2024 and was written about the safe environment they felt making music in Christlow's room.

In early 2025, Girl Group released the song "Yay! Saturday". The song was written when the group were going out a lot and felt no responsibility. It was followed by "Flink Pike", a Nordic expression for "good girl". The song critiqued the societal pressures and expectations of women. After releasing another single, "Your Fantasy", they announced their debut extended play (EP), Think They're Looking, Let's Perform. The six-track EP was released on 20 June 2025. A month later, they opened for Olivia Dean's Paris show. They also performed on the BBC Introducing stage at Reading and Leeds Festival in 2025. September 2025 saw Girl Group release the pop punk track "Rage Song".

== Artistry ==
Girl Group have cited Lily Allen, Sabrina Carpenter, Wet Leg, Addison Rae, Chappell Roan and Charli XCX as musical inspirations. They listed Charli XCX's 2024 album Brat as an inspiration for their debut EP. Christlow grew up as a musical theatre fan and lived in a pub where live bands often performed. Halvorsen was taken to Roskilde Festival as a child, while Gundersen descends from poets and songwriters. Tollisen was brought up around the music of Joni Mitchell and Paul Simon, while Birkeland is inspired by Disney Channel music, which they have described as useful when writing their hooks. Non-musicians they’re influenced by in their career are Audrey Hepburn and Florence Pugh.

== Discography ==
=== Extended plays ===
List of extended plays, with selected details
Title	Details
Think They're Looking, Let's Perform	Released: 20 June 2025; Label: Independent; Formats: Digital download, streaming
Little Sticky Pictures	Released: 20 March 2026; Label: Universal Music; Formats: Digital download, streaming

=== Singles ===
==== As lead artist ====
List of singles as a lead artist, with selected chart positions, showing year released and album name
Title	Year	Peak chart positions	Album
Title	Year	EST Air.	Album
"Life is Dumb"	2023	—	Non-album singles
"Lil's Room"	2024	—	Non-album singles
"Yay! Saturday"	2025	—	Think They're Looking, Let's Perform
"Flink Pike"	2025	—	Think They're Looking, Let's Perform
"Your Fantasy"	2025	—	Think They're Looking, Let's Perform
"Rage Song"	2025	—	Little Sticky Pictures
"She Goes"	2025	95	Little Sticky Pictures
"SuperDrug"	2026	—	Little Sticky Pictures
"Food Shopping"	2026	—	TBA
"—" denotes recording did not chart in that territory.

=== As featured artist ===
List of singles as featured artist, showing year released
Title	Year	Other artist(s)	Album
"The Prize" (remix)	2025	Prima Queen	TBA

== Awards and nominations ==
Year	Ceremony	Category	Nominee(s)/work(s)	Result	Ref.
2025	NRK Urørt	Urørt of the Year	Girl Group	Won	
2025	Notion New Music Awards	Best New Pop	Girl Group	Nominated	
