= Rekesh Chauhan =

British Indian pianist

Rekesh Chauhan BEM
- Born: London
- Education: University of Leicester
- Occupations: Pianist, music composer
- Awards: NIAA Young Musician of the Year

Rekesh Chauhan BEM is a British Indian pianist and music composer.

== Education ==
Chauhan studied Economics at the University of Leicester.

== Career ==
Chauhan combines eastern and western musical styles. He has performed at both the Royal Albert Hall and Birmingham Symphony Hall and collaborated with Rahat Fateh Ali Khan, Talvin Singh and Soumik Datta. Chauhan has released two studio albums. His debut classical album Beyond Roots was featured by BBC Radio.

== Honours, awards and recognition ==
Chauhan was awarded the British Empire Medal (BEM) in the 2023 Birthday Honours for services to music, charity and mental health in the British Asian community, particularly during Covid-19.

- Alumnus of the Year 2019 Award by Leicester University
- Young Musician of the Year 2018 at the National Indian Art Awards held at Queen Elizabeth Hall
