= Ron Francis (artist) =

Australian artist

- Born: Ronald Malcolm Francis; 5 September 1954 (age 72); Stanmore, Sydney, Australia
- Known for: Trompe-l'œil / Fine art

Ronald Malcolm Francis (born 5 September 1954) is an Australian artist who paints in a trompe-l'œil style.

Francis was born in Stanmore, Sydney, Australia. In 1974 he moved to Melbourne, where he exhibited with Profile Gallery and later with MCA (Melbourne Contemporary Art Gallery). Around 1988 he began painting trompe-l'œil murals in affiliation with a company called Fresco Site Specific Art.

He moved to South Australia in 1991 and continued to paint trompe-l'œil murals until 2005 when, motivated by illness, he stopped taking commissions and returned to exhibiting fine art. Since 2010 he has been living in Tasmania.
