= Kevin Mazur =

American photographer

Kevin Mazur is an American photographer who specializes in celebrities. He is one of the leading photographers for Getty Images.
