= Living in a Ghost Town =

Single by the Rolling Stones

from the album Hackney Diamonds (Japanese edition)
- Released: 23 April 2020
- Recorded: 2019, 2020
- Genre: Blues rock; reggae rock
- Length: 4:07
- Label: Polydor
- Songwriter: Jagger/Richards
- Producers: The Glimmer Twins; Don Was

The Rolling Stones singles chronology
"Just Your Fool" (2016)	"Living in a Ghost Town" (2020)	"Criss Cross" (2020)

Music video
- "Living in a Ghost Town" on YouTube

"Living in a Ghost Town" is a song by English rock band the Rolling Stones. The song was recorded during sessions of the Rolling Stones in 2019, ultimately being finished the following year. The track is reggae-influenced and features lyrics and a music video that reference the COVID-19 pandemic. It was released as a digital download and streaming single on 23 April 2020, through Polydor Records. The song was the Rolling Stones' first single in four years and the first original material from the band since "Doom and Gloom" and "One More Shot" in 2012. It received generally positive reviews from music critics and was a commercial success, appearing on over a dozen sales and streaming charts. It is the final original recording by the band to feature Charlie Watts before his death in August 2021. It also appears as a bonus track on the Japanese release of the band's 2023 album Hackney Diamonds.

== Recording and composition ==
Since 2017, the Rolling Stones had been on the No Filter Tour but had to stop touring in 2020 due to the COVID-19 pandemic. The Rolling Stones remotely performed at Global Citizen's Together at Home concert on 18 April 2020, helping raise money for healthcare workers and the World Health Organization during the crisis. On 23 April, the band released "Living in a Ghost Town" online as a single. It was based on 2019 recording sessions and finished remotely, making this their first original material since 2012 and their first release since the 2016 cover album Blue & Lonesome. Vocalist Mick Jagger claims to have written the lyrics in 10 minutes. The band fast-tracked releasing the song due to its relevance to social distancing, which has been used as a method to control the spread of COVID-19. While the original narrative of the song was about being a ghost after a plague, Jagger changed some of the lyrics to refer to the pandemic.

Nidhi Gupta of GQ India labeled "Living in a Ghost Town" as a "gentle blues-rock number". Multiple writers noticed a reggae influence in the song: Will Hodgkinson of The Irish Times described the song as "a slow-paced chug with a tint of reggae", while Alexis Petridis from The Guardian noted a "vintage reggae flavour" in the song's "stabbing, echoing organ", and Louder Sound's Fraser Lewry calling it "a relaxed piece of reggae-infused rock".

After the single's release, the Rolling Stones collaborated with Brazilian disc jockey Alok to create a remix to which, in the view of Rolling Stone's Daniel Kreps, "Alok applied a buoyant dance-music sheen and propulsive beat [...] while still preserving the track's more spectral elements."

== Release and reception ==
The song was initially released for digital download and streaming as a single on 23 April 2020, being accompanied by a music video with footage of empty city streets that was taken from across the world. A CD single and purple vinyl, both of which are exclusive to the band's online store, and an orange vinyl for sale by other retailers were later released.

Writing in The Guardian, Alexis Petridis awarded the song four out of five stars, calling it the Rolling Stones' "best new song in years", with particular emphasis on the timely lyrics and reggae influence to the music. Writing for The Irish Times, Will Hodginkson gave the same score and agreed that the song's pacing and mood captures the experience of being in lockdown during the pandemic. Craig Jenkins of Vulture opined that the single arrives "right on time" as the "track lands in the sweet spot between wistful boomer nostalgia and tacit acknowledgment that the sands of time have shifted, and once again we’re looking fondly backward instead of excitedly forward". Mark Beaumont of NME panned the track, calling it a "a rushed and half-baked comment on our current predicament", particularly critiquing the lyrics, as "Jagger perhaps doesn't have it in him to speak to the real discomfort and isolation of the average British hutch dweller, or the fear and hopelessness of the millions falling unfairly through the gaping holes in Rishi Sunak's fishnet safety packages". The New York Times prepares a regular list of the most notable music releases of the week, and Jon Pareles recommended the track. For Stereogum, Tom Breihan briefly commented on the track and the band's relevance, writing that it was highly produced but "rocks harder than you might expect a new Stones song to rock".

On 3 July 2020, "Living in a Ghost Town" topped the German singles chart, after several different special editions were released for the song. This made the Rolling Stones the oldest artists ever to reach number one on the chart and giving them the longest gap between two number-one singles in Germany, following on from "Jumpin' Jack Flash" reaching number one in 1968. Streaming numbers were not higher than they had been for the previous few weeks due to the placement in for the German Charts being purely sales-dependent; it does not depend on the number of streams.

== Personnel ==
Credits sources from single liner notes

The Rolling Stones

- Mick Jagger – vocals, guitar, harmonica, production (as a member of the Glimmer Twins)
- Keith Richards – guitar, backing vocals, production (as a member of the Glimmer Twins)
- Charlie Watts – drums
- Ronnie Wood – lead guitar, backing vocals

Additional personnel

- Matt Clifford – keyboards, French horn, flugelhorn, saxophone, engineering
- Darryl Jones – bass guitar
- Krish Sharma – engineering
- Cenzo Townshend – mixing
- Don Was – production

== Charts ==
Chart performance for "Living in a Ghost Town"
Chart (2020)	Peak position
Australia Digital Song Sales (Billboard)	6
Austria (Ö3 Austria Top 40)	53
Belgium (Ultratop 50 Flanders)	34
Belgium (Ultratip Bubbling Under Wallonia)	6
Canada Hot 100 (Billboard)	74
Europe Digital Song Sales (Billboard)	3
France (SNEP)	83
Germany (GfK)	1
Hungary (Single Top 40)	6
Iceland (Tónlistinn)	34
Italy (FIMI)	49
Mexico Ingles Airplay (Billboard)	23
Netherlands (Single Top 100)	71
Poland Airplay (ZPAV)	49
Portugal (AFP)	37
Scottish Singles Sales (Official Charts)	2
Switzerland (Schweizer Hitparade)	17
UK Singles (Official Charts)	61
US Bubbling Under Hot 100 (Billboard)	6
US Digital Song Sales (Billboard)	4
US Hot Rock & Alternative Songs (Billboard)	3
US Rock & Alternative Airplay (Billboard)	31

== Certifications ==
Certifications for "Living in a Ghost Town"
Region	Certification	Certified units/sales
Brazil (Pro-Música Brasil)	Platinum	40,000^{‡}
^{‡} Sales+streaming figures based on certification alone.

== Release history ==
Release dates and formats for 'Living in a Ghost Town'
Formats	Date	Label
Digital download and streaming	23 April 2020	Polydor Records
CD single	29 May 2020	Polydor Records
10" vinyl	26 June 2020	Polydor Records

== See also ==
- "Ghost Town", a 1981 Specials single
- "Murder Most Foul", a 2020 Bob Dylan single that has been compared to this song
