= Sweet Love (group) =

British girl group

- Origin: London, England
- Genre: Pop
- Years active: 2023–present
- Label: Greenback
- Members: Jasmine Hood; Honey Harrison Maw; Venice Salam; Maya Willis

Sweet Love are a British girl group consisting of members Jasmine Hood, Honey Harrison Maw, Venice Salam and Maya Willis. They formed in 2023 and supported S Club 7 on their arena tour across the United Kingdom from 2023 to 2024. They are managed by former East 17 singer Blair London and are signed to Greenback Records. They released their debut single, "Bad Guy", in 2025.

== History ==
Sweet Love are managed by former East 17 singer Blair London. Member Jasmine Hood has known London since she was 13; her mother contacted him regarding management but he insisted that she was too young. Her mother persisted each year until Hood herself began sending him singing videos when she was older. London requested a meeting with Hood and her mother and informed her that he wanted to make a girl group. Hood suggested various women for the group, including eventual member Honey Harrison Maw, who she attended school with. Maw recommended eventual member Venice Salam, while London scouted model Maya Willis when he learned she could also sing.

Before they had performed in front of anyone, manager London was adamant that he could book them as a support act for S Club 7's 2023 arena tour, since he was friends with Bradley McIntosh from the group. He persuaded McIntosh to book Sweet Love for two of their arena shows; S Club 7 watched them perform from the side of the stage and subsequently booked them as the support act for the rest of the tour. They also supported Hrvy's tour. Following the tours, they were signed to Greenback Records, owned by Conor McGregor. McGregor billed them the "biggest girl band since the Spice Girls".

Sweet Love released their debut single, "Bad Guy", in April 2025. With the release of the track, they said that they wanted to "empower women" with their music. They performed "Bad Guy" on MTV, as well as releasing an acoustic version of the song. In September 2025, they went on to release their second single, "I Hate You So Much", featuring American rapper Xzibit. Music videos were released alongside both songs, choreographed by Sophie Hind.

== Artistry ==
Hood listed Christina Aguilera as a musical influence, while Maw listed Olivia Rodrigo, Salam listed Beyoncé and Willis listed Adele.

== Discography ==
=== Singles ===
List of singles as lead artist, showing year released
Title	Year	Album
"Bad Guy"	2025	TBA
"I Hate You So Much" (featuring Xzibit)	2025	TBA
"Maybe I'm Crazy"	2025	TBA

=== Music videos ===
Main artist music videos
Title	Year	Director(s)	Ref.
"Bad Guy"	2025	Blair London	
"I Hate You So Much"	2025	Blair London	
