= Albert Halls, Stirling =

Coordinates: 56.11816°N 3.94193°W

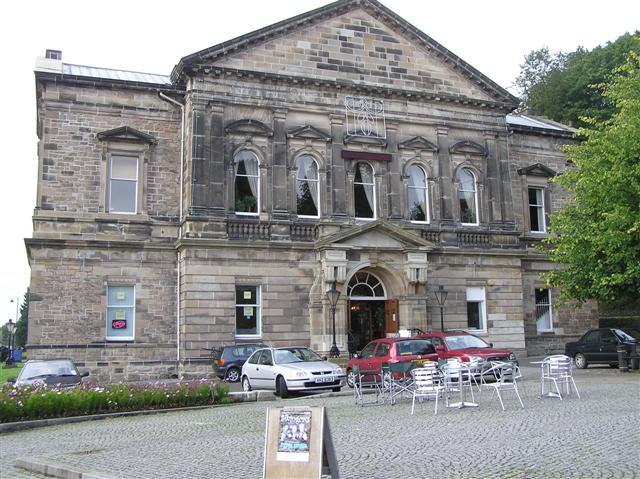
Albert Halls

The Albert Halls are a concert and conference venue on Dumbarton Road, in Stirling, Scotland.

The building was designed by William Simpson in 1881 and opened in October 1883. It was designated as a Category B Listed Building in 1978.
