= Ron Francis Blake =

American musician

Ron Francis Blake (born May 23, 1972) is a trumpeter from Los Angeles. He has recorded and performed alongside numerous Grammy winning artists such as The Rolling Stones, Elton John, Aaliyah, Ben Harper, Dr. Dre, and Ziggy Marley. Blake also played with Green Day on their American Idiot tour and appears on the live DVD Bullet in a Bible. He also recorded on their 2016 release Revolution Radio.

At the age of sixteen, Blake auditioned and was accepted into the Hamilton High School Academy of Music magnet. During this time he studied with vibraphonist, Charlie Shoemake to further his jazz theory. Blake studied at Cal State Northridge. As a student, he won the 1992 International Trumpet Guild's Jazz Improvisation competition in Rotterdam. He also won 1st place in the local Dolo Coker Jazz Scholarship and Outstanding Trumpet Player in the Pacific Coast Jazz Festival. Blake went on to study at the California Institute of the Arts on a full scholarship and achieved his master's degree in Music.

Blake runs HiSpeedHorns, a website allowing artists to get horn arrangements via remote internet sessions. The website was featured in Mix Magazine.

Blake currently plays with Poncho Sanchez and is featured on 4 studio albums and 2 live albums. He also released his debut solo Latin jazz album, “Assimilation” in 2017 which features Poncho Sanchez as a guest. Blake recorded and performed on the 2020 Academy Awards with Elton John for the biopic Rocket Man. The song “I Want To Love Me Again” won a Golden Globe for best song and an Oscar for best song. Ron can also be heard on the Rolling Stones’ Grammy Award winning album, Hackney Diamonds as well as Elton John and Brandi Carlile’s collaborative album, Who Believes in Angels?. He also worked on the latest Rolling Stones album , Foreign Tongues, released in July of 2026.
