= The Rolling Stones' first concert in China =

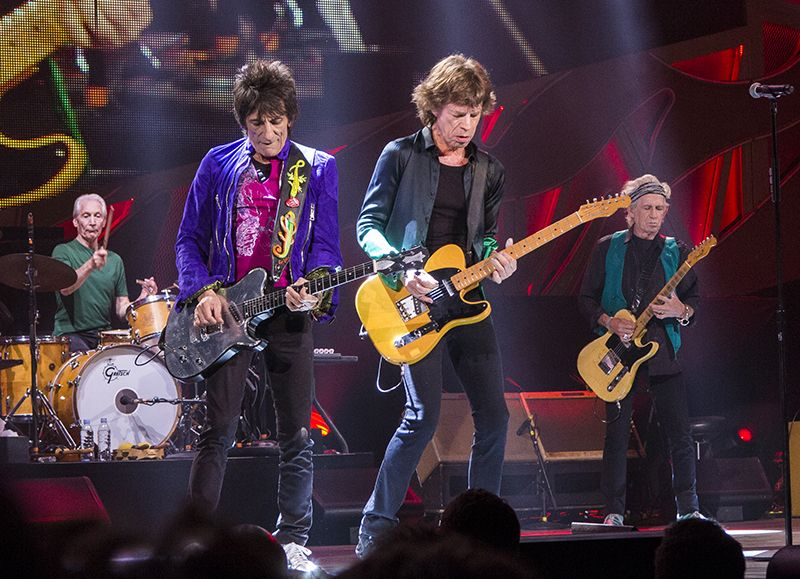
The Rolling Stones performing at the Summerfest festival on June 23, 2015

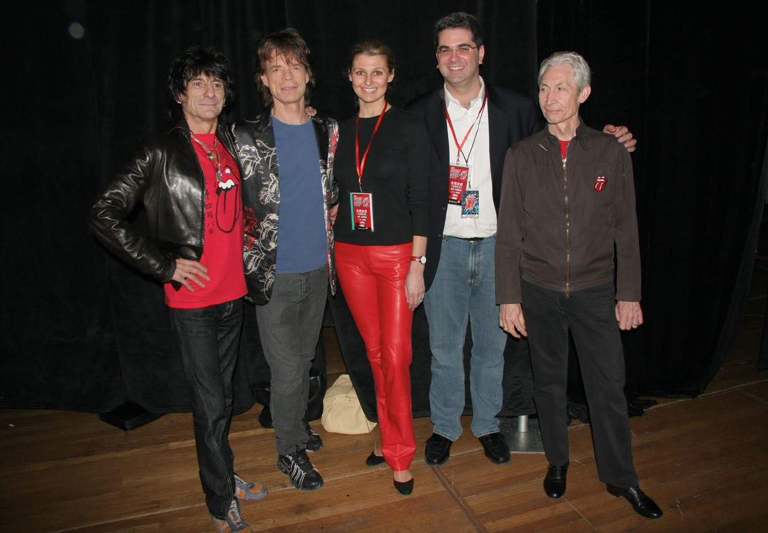
Jonathan Krane with members of the Rolling Stones in Shanghai, China, April 8, 2006

The Rolling Stones' first concert in China was held in 2006.

== Background ==
On April 8, 2006, The Rolling Stones held their first ever performance in China. The concert occurred 3 years after the tour they originally planned was delayed by the SARS epidemic. The tour was promoted by China-based Entertainment Company Emma Entertainment led by then CEO Jonathan Krane. The Stones performed at the Shanghai Grand Theater in front of an audience of 8,000 people. The show was completely sold out, with ticket prices varying from $36 to $360. The Rolling Stones had to obtain approval for their set list from China's Ministry of Culture and were prohibited from playing 5 songs including "Brown Sugar," "Beast of Burden," "Let's Spend the Night Together," and "Honky Tonk Woman." The Chinese rock pioneer Cui Jian opened the show and then later returned to the stage to join Mick Jagger for a performance of "Wild Horses" which was the 5th song in the set.

The Shanghai performance became part of the Bigger Bang Tour which was The Stone's most attended tour in history with attendance surpassing 4 million people. From August 2005 to August 2007, the tour generated revenue of $558,255,524 with tickets sold surpassing 4.68 million.

== Cultural impact ==
The concert was held during the lead-up to the 2008 Beijing Olympics when the Chinese government decided that it needed to open the country to live international content "as a sort of massive rehearsal before the games." While some critics said the high-ticket prices were prohibitive for local Chinese music fans, the participation of artists such as Cui Jian marked a major symbolic milestone for Chinese rock 'n' roll fans. The Rolling Stones returned to play at the Shanghai Mercedes-Benz Arena in China in 2014. The popularity of rock 'n' roll in China still endures as evidenced by the proliferation of numerous rock festivals in China such as the Beijing pop festival which was started 1 year after The Rolling Stones first performance.

== Setlist ==
No.	Title	Length
1.	"Start Me Up"	3:33
2.	"You Got Me Rocking"	3:36
3.	"Oh No, Not You Again"	3:46
4.	"Bitch"	3:36
5.	"Wild Horses"	5:42
6.	"Rain Fall Down"	4:54
7.	"Midnight Rambler"	6:52
8.	"Gimme Shelter"	4:30
9.	"Tumbling Dice"	3:46
10.	"This Place Is Empty"	3:16
11.	"Happy"	3:04
12.	"Sympathy for the Devil"	6:16
13.	"Miss You"	4:48
14.	"It's Only Rock 'n' Roll (but I Like It)"	5:08
15.	"Paint It Black"	3:22
16.	"Jumpin' Jack Flash"	3:42
17.	"You Can't Always Get What You Want"	7:28
18.	"(I Can't Get No) Satisfaction"	3:42
