= The Biggest Bang =

Video by The Rolling Stones
- Released: June 2007
- Recorded: 18 February – 22 October 2006 in Rio de Janeiro, Brazil; Buenos Aires, Argentina; Saitama, Japan; Shanghai, China; Austin, Texas, United States
- Genre: Rock
- Label: Redline Entertainment
- Directors: Hamish Hamilton, J. B. De Oliveira, Toru Uehara, Wang Xianshen, Fernando Rolan, Jacob Cohl, Anthony Green
- Producers: The Rolling Stones, Done and Dusted, Marty Callner, Randall Gladstein

The Rolling Stones chronology
Four Flicks (2003)	The Biggest Bang (2007)	Shine a Light (2008)

The Biggest Bang is a four-disc concert DVD collection released by the Rolling Stones. The collection documents several shows from the band's 2005–2006 legs of their A Bigger Bang Tour. The DVD debuted at number one on Billboard's music video chart, selling 20,422 copies during the first week, and had sold almost 48,000 copies by mid-September 2007. By 2012 it was certified seven times multi-platinum in the United States for shipments of some 175,000 units. It was re-released on Blu-ray on 16 June 2009, with only the concert of Austin and accompanying mini-documentary, the Salt of the Earth tour documentary, and the excerpt of the Saitama concert.

== Track listing ==
=== Disc 1: Zilker Park, Austin, Texas – 22 October 2006 ===
1. Opening (intro)
2. "You Got Me Rocking"
3. "Let's Spend the Night Together"
4. "She's So Cold"
5. "Oh No, Not You Again"
6. "Sway"
7. "Bob Wills Is Still the King"
8. "Streets of Love"
9. "Ain't Too Proud to Beg"
10. "Tumbling Dice"
11. "Learning the Game"
12. "Little T&A"
13. "Under My Thumb"
14. "Get Off of My Cloud"
15. "Honky Tonk Women"
16. "Sympathy for the Devil"
17. "Jumpin' Jack Flash"
18. "(I Can't Get No) Satisfaction"
19. "Brown Sugar"

==== Bonus features ====
1. "Austin Mini-Documentary"
2. "I Can't Be Satisfied" from Milan, Italy
3. "Jukebox Feature"

=== Disc 2: Copacabana Beach, Rio de Janeiro, Brazil – 18 February 2006 ===
1. Opening (intro)
2. "Jumpin' Jack Flash"
3. "It's Only Rock 'n Roll (But I Like It)"
4. "You Got Me Rocking"
5. "Wild Horses"
6. "Rain Fall Down"
7. "Midnight Rambler"
8. "The Night Time (Is The Right Time)"
9. "Happy"
10. "Miss You"
11. "Rough Justice"
12. "Get Off of My Cloud"
13. "Honky Tonk Women"
14. "Start Me Up"
15. "Brown Sugar"
16. "You Can't Always Get What You Want"
17. "(I Can't Get No) Satisfaction"

==== Bonus feature ====
- Rio de Janeiro documentary

=== Disc 3: Rest of the World ===
==== Saitama Super Arena, Saitama, Japan – 2 April 2006 ====
1. Opening (intro)
2. "Let's Spend the Night Together"
  Sapporo (segue)
3. "Rain Fall Down"
  Tokyo Dome (segue)
4. "Rough Justice"
  Cherry Blossoms (segue)

==== Shanghai Grand Stage, Shanghai, China – 8 April 2006 ====
1. Opening (intro)
2. "Bitch"
3. "Midnight Rambler"
4. "Gimme Shelter"
5. "This Place Is Empty"
  That's What I Do (segue)
6. "It's Only Rock 'n' Roll (But I Like It)"
  China, A Slow Process (segue)

==== River Plate Stadium, Buenos Aires, Argentina – 21 February and/or 23, 2006 ====
1. Opening (intro)
2. "Worried About You"
  Football Chant (segue)
3. "Happy"
4. "Miss You"
  Ronnie & Audience (segue)
5. "Paint It Black"
6. "(I Can't Get No) Satisfaction"

==== Featurettes ====
1. Bonnie Raitt featurette "Shine a Light"
2. Eddie Vedder featurette "Wild Horses"
3. Dave Matthews featurette "Let It Bleed"

==== Duets ====
1. "Shine a Light" featuring Bonnie Raitt
2. "Wild Horses" featuring Eddie Vedder
3. "Let It Bleed" featuring Dave Matthews
4. "Wild Horses" featuring Cui Jian
5. "Jukebox Feature"

=== Disc 4 ===
1. "Salt of the Earth: A Bigger Bang Tour Documentary"

==== Bonus songs ====
1. "Get Up, Stand Up"
2. "Mr. Pitiful"

==== Bonus features ====
1. "If It Ain't Got That Swing" featuring Charlie Watts
2. "Hurricane" featuring Keith Richards
3. "Outlets of Emotion" featuring Ron Wood
4. "Busking" featuring Mick Jagger

== Charts and certifications ==
=== Weekly charts ===
Chart (2007)	Peak position
Australian DVDs	14
Austrian Music DVDs	1
Belgian (Flanders) Music DVDs	1
Belgian (Wallonia) Music DVDs	1
Danish Music DVDs	1
Dutch Music DVDs	1
Finnish Music DVDs	2
German Albums	1
Greek DVDs	1
Hungarian DVDs	3
Irish Music DVDs	2
Italian Music DVDs	1
New Zealand Music DVDs	2
Norwegian Music DVDs	1
Spanish Music DVDs	1
Swedish DVDs	1
Swiss Albums	22

=== Certifications ===
Region	Certification	Certified units/sales
Australia (ARIA)	Gold	7,500^{^}
Brazil (Pro-Música Brasil)	Platinum	30,000^{*}
Germany (BVMI)	Gold	25,000^{^}
Switzerland (IFPI Switzerland)	Gold	3,000^{^}
United States (RIAA)	7× Platinum	175,000^{^}
^{*} Sales figures based on certification alone.^{^} Shipments figures based on certification alone.

=== Year-end charts ===
Year	Country	Chart	Rank
2007	Germany	IFPI	79
