= A Bigger Bang Tour =

2005–07 concert tour by the Rolling Stones

A Bigger Bang
- World tour by The Rolling Stones
- Location: Asia; Europe; North America; Oceania; South America
- Associated album: A Bigger Bang
- Start date: 21 August 2005
- End date: 26 August 2007
- No. of shows: 147
- Box office: US$558.3 million ($866.88 million in 2025 dollars)

The Rolling Stones concert chronology
- Licks Tour (2002–03); A Bigger Bang (2005–07); 50 & Counting Tour (2012–13)

A Bigger Bang was a worldwide concert tour by the Rolling Stones which took place between August 2005 and August 2007, in support of their album A Bigger Bang. At the time, it was the highest-grossing tour of all time, earning $558,255,524, before being surpassed by U2's 2009–11 U2 360 Tour, and eventually Taylor Swift's 2023–24 Eras Tour. The tour was chronicled on the video release The Biggest Bang, compiling full performances, several recordings from shows and documentaries. Notable concerts on the tour included a two-night stand in the autumn of 2006 at the Beacon Theatre filmed by Martin Scorsese for Shine a Light, and their half-time performance at Super Bowl XL.

== History ==
In 2005, the Stones announced plans for another world tour starting 21 August at a press conference and a mini concert at the Juilliard School in New York City. The A Bigger Bang Tour was expected to include dates throughout the United States and Canada before going to South America, Asia and Europe. During the Q&A, Mick Jagger told reporters that it would not necessarily be their last tour.

All rehearsals for the tour took place in Toronto, Ontario, at the midtown private school Greenwood College School; for the full stage rehearsals, a hangar at Pearson International Airport was rented.

In keeping with tradition, the Rolling Stones performed a surprise club show on 10 August 2005 at the Phoenix Concert Theatre before an audience of 1,000, each only paying $10 (the Phoenix's regular cover charge).

The tour had its official start on 21 August 2005 with two shows at historic Fenway Park in Boston. The Stones' huge stage caused extensive damage to the outfield, so that approximately 40,000 square feet (4,000 m^{2}) of sod had to be brought in to repair it, and a subsequent baseball game held at the park three days later had to be pushed back an hour to give the grounds crew more time to complete the repairs.

At the end of 2005, it was announced by tour producer Michael Cohl that the A Bigger Bang Tour had grossed a record-shattering $162 million since opening at Fenway Park. This broke the previous North American record, held by the Stones themselves for their own 1994/1995 Voodoo Lounge Tour, which grossed approximately $120 million. In terms of revenue, the A Bigger Bang Tour was the largest tour in North America. The second largest was the Stones' 1997/1998 Bridges to Babylon Tour.

On 1 February 2006, the Stones played their first concert at the Baltimore Arena since 1969, the second smallest venue they played for the entire tour. Their most intimate performance, save the surprise Phoenix show in Toronto, was in Radio City Music Hall on 14 March 2006, in a private concert for supporters of the Robin Hood Foundation. This benefit concert was their only performance at the venue to date. Other intimate venues the Stones played during the tour was the Beacon Theatre in New York City. On 28 August 2005, the Rolling Stones performed at Frank Clair Stadium in Ottawa, Ontario, Canada, their first performance in Ottawa since a performance at the Ottawa Auditorium 40 years earlier on 24 April 1965.

While on the American leg of the tour, on 5 February 2006 the Stones played "Start Me Up", "Rough Justice" and "(I Can't Get No) Satisfaction" at the halftime show of Super Bowl XL in Detroit. Before performing "Satisfaction", Jagger made an uncharacteristic comment on their longevity: "This one we could've done for Super Bowl I." Jagger was asked to leave out two sexually suggestive lyrics (“you'd make a dead man come”) The audio on his microphone was lowered twice for the two requested omissions, but Jagger still sang those lyrics.

The outstanding scale of the tour was realised on 18 February 2006 when the Stones played a one-night concert on Copacabana Beach in Rio de Janeiro, Brazil. The free concert was broadcast on television and broke several records as the largest rock concert of all time. There were a reported two million people present on the beach and crowding subsequent streets. A special bridge was constructed for the band to cross from the stage to the hotel safely. Three days after the monstrous event, U2 played in São Paulo, and clearly affected by the huge night, ended their concert with the words: "I can't get no satisfaction!". While the Guinness Book of World Records states the largest free concert ever was given in the same spot in 1994 by Rod Stewart, to 3.5 million people, that figure includes everyone who was on Copacabana Beach for fireworks and New Year's Eve celebrations, not just for that concert. This show was recorded for exhibition on digital movie screens across the United States via Regal Cinemas and heard live on XM Radio. Additionally, the show was shown live on AOL Music in partnership with Network Live. The record was broken 18 years later on May 4, 2024, by Madonna on The Celebration Tour.

The Stones arrived on 8 April in the People's Republic of China for their first-ever performance in the world's most populous country (performances planned in 2003 for the Licks Tour were canceled due to the SARS epidemic). The Chinese authorities requested that the group not perform "Brown Sugar", "Honky Tonk Women", "Beast of Burden", and "Let's Spend the Night Together", as they were considered to be "too suggestive."

The Biggest Bang, a four-disc concert DVD collection with several shows from the band's 2005–2006 legs of this tour, was released in June 2007.

"A Bigger Bang: Live on Copacabana Beach", a double CD / triple LP / Blu-ray / double DVD live album, was released on July 9, 2021.

After their 18 April 2006 performance in Wellington, New Zealand, the Rolling Stones took a one-month break before embarking on the European leg of their A Bigger Bang Tour. Mick Jagger remained in New Zealand to film a cameo in the sitcom The Knights of Prosperity, while Keith Richards and Ronnie Wood went to Fiji for two weeks with their wives.

During the vacation, Richards fell from a tree. After suffering a concussion, he was rushed back to Ascot Private Hospital in Auckland, New Zealand, for further observation. Although reports claimed he had been released two days later, it was soon confirmed by the hospital he underwent brain surgery on 5 May to relieve a blood clot that had gathered behind his skull. The BBC reported that upon discharge, Richards profusely thanked the hospital staff for his care.

On 15 May, Britain's The Independent newspaper said that the injury meant up to six shows could be pulled from the start of the band's European tour at an estimated cost of £1 million a show. The A Bigger Bang Tour restarted in Milan, Italy on 11 July 2006 at Stadio Giuseppe Meazza, with Jagger singing an entire Italian translation of "As Tears Go By" and Richards having made a full recovery; four of the first fifteen dates were rescheduled for later in the summer, with the rest of the dates taking place in the summer of 2007. As well as the first fifteen dates, two more dates were postponed due to Jagger contracting laryngitis.

The only previous show cancelled was one in Dublin, Ireland, due to complications with the promoter. Due to delays with construction, the two shows set to be at Wembley Stadium were moved to Twickenham Stadium, London, England. To promote this European leg of the A Bigger Bang Tour, there were plans to release the new track "Biggest Mistake" from the A Bigger Bang album.

In mid-August 2007, several media sources reported that the band would quit touring at the end of their tour, and the last concert on the tour, in London on 26 August, would be their last gig ever. Less than a week later, in an interview with The Sun newspaper, Wood said the band had no plans to quit. and Jagger also stated "I'm sure the Rolling Stones will do more things and more records and more tours."

The tour concluded with a record total gross of $558,255,524. This surpassed the previous record of $377 million earned by U2 for their successful Vertigo Tour. The Stones also hold the record for third and fourth-highest-grossing tours with the Voodoo Lounge Tour and Bridges to Babylon Tour.

The official logo for the tour was the "Chippy Tongue"—an exploding re-design of the tongue and lips logo.

== The show ==
There were five different ticket options at each concert in the USA: Gold Seating $100, Diamond Seating $350, Premium Seating $175, General Admission $100 and Side Seating $50. In the United Kingdom, the price levels were £40, £60, £90, £150 and £340. Tickets had been seen on eBay for up to $4000. Hundreds of tickets remained unsold at some of the band's UK shows, such as the show at Hampden Park, Glasgow, Scotland, though the show at the Millennium Stadium in Cardiff, Wales, was a sell out. The first concert at Fenway Park also saw California Governor Arnold Schwarzenegger charge 36 Republican donors US$100,000 each to view the show with him in his VIP box. Jagger quipped about Schwarzenegger, "Apparently he's been fundraising outside, selling bootleg T-shirts and scalping tickets", to the crowd, with Richards adding, "Hey, Arnold, don't forget our cut on the T-shirts."

The A Bigger Bang Tour stage was designed by Mark Fisher. Production design was by Fisher, Charlie Watts, Mick Jagger and Patrick Woodroffe. The show included state-of-the-art electronics that presented visual screen shots of the Stones Tongue and live footage. The stage was 25 m (84 ft) tall. The multi-level construction included balconies behind the stage with accommodation for 400 audience. As on the Bridges to Babylon and Licks tours, the band played part of the set on a 'B' stage in the center of the field. A section of the stage detached itself and rolled the entire band along a catwalk, creating an "island" B stage in the middle of the stadium. Unusual stage designs in and of themselves have been a feature since Rolling Stones Tour of the Americas '75.

The introduction featured fireworks and computer-generated graphics representing the literal Big Bang. The four band members' faces hazily appear, and further graphics depicting fast travel through a city's streets before Keith Richards appeared on the screen to the sound of the band's opening song (mainly "Start Me Up" or "Jumpin' Jack Flash" although a handful of other numbers opened shows on the tour).

During the concerts, one large central screen played live footage of the various band members, predominantly Jagger. Either side of the main screen, there were two sets of lighting effect panels that combine with the main screen to produce visual effects at various points in the show.

At stadium gigs, during "Sympathy for the Devil", huge flames were sent into the air above the stage. During the 1970s, this song only made sporadic live appearances, though is captured on 1977's Love You Live. However, since 1989's Steel Wheels Tour, "Sympathy for the Devil" has become a setlist mainstay and a vehicle for the show's most elaborate effects.

On Saturday 11 November 2006, Mick Jagger's father, Joe Jagger, died of pneumonia at age ninety-three in Kingston upon Thames near London. Jagger flew to Britain the day before to see his father one last time before returning to Las Vegas the same day, where he was to perform on Saturday night. The show went ahead as scheduled.

== Personnel ==
Rolling Stones

- Mick Jagger – lead vocals, guitars, harmonica, keyboards
- Keith Richards – rhythm guitars, backing vocals
- Ronnie Wood – lead guitar
- Charlie Watts – drums

Additional musicians

- Darryl Jones – bass
- Chuck Leavell – keyboards, backing vocals
- Bernard Fowler – backing vocals
- Lisa Fischer – backing vocals, percussion
- Blondie Chaplin – backing vocals, acoustic guitar
- Bobby Keys – saxophone
- Tim Ries – saxophone, keyboards
- Michael Davis – trombone
- Kent Smith – trumpet

== Set lists ==
The set list played at the concerts changed at every destination and included new and old songs, but mostly centred around the same numbers. Altogether 80 different songs were played. At almost every destination, the opening song switched between "Jumpin' Jack Flash", "Start Me Up", "It's Only Rock 'n Roll (But I Like It)", and "Paint It Black"; the closing numbers were either "(I Can't Get No) Satisfaction" or "Brown Sugar." A selection of new material was frequent as well as two songs sung by guitarist Keith Richards.

New tracks included: "Rough Justice", "Infamy", "This Place Is Empty", "It Won't Take Long", "Rain Fall Down", "Streets of Love", "Back of My Hand" and "Oh No, Not You Again."

The set list for the final show in The O2 in London, England, on 26 August – the last concert of the tour – was the following:

1. "Start Me Up"
2. "You Got Me Rocking"
3. "Rough Justice"
4. "Ain't Too Proud to Beg"
5. "She Was Hot"
6. "You Can't Always Get What You Want"
7. "Can't You Hear Me Knocking"
8. "I'll Go Crazy"
9. "Tumbling Dice"
10. "You Got the Silver"
11. "Wanna Hold You"
12. "Miss You"
13. "It's Only Rock 'n Roll (But I Like It)"
14. "(I Can't Get No) Satisfaction"
15. "Honky Tonk Women"
16. "Sympathy for the Devil"
17. "Paint It Black"
18. "Jumpin' Jack Flash"
19. "Brown Sugar"

== Support acts ==
Artists playing as an introduction to the Stones at various destinations included Toots & the Maytals, Lifehouse, The Black Eyed Peas, Alice Cooper, Maroon 5, Kanye West, Beck, Pearl Jam, The Smashing Pumpkins, Alanis Morissette, Christina Aguilera, Mötley Crüe, Metallica, Brooks & Dunn, Bonnie Raitt, Trey Anastasio, Dave Matthews Band, Living Colour, The Living End, Joss Stone, Nickelback, Everclear, Buddy Guy, The Charlatans, Regina, Feeder, the John Mayer Trio, Wilco, Richie Kotzen Los Lonely Boys and Our Lady Peace.

Dominican artist Juan Luis Guerra opened the San Juan, Puerto Rico, show, making him the only Merengue artist that has ever opened for the Stones. This opening act "garnered the best reception ever seen at a Stones show", as reported by It's Only Rock and Roll, the Rolling Stones Fan Club of Europe.

For the Halifax, Nova Scotia, show acts included Halifax natives Sloan, well known rap artist Kanye West and Alice Cooper. Black Rebel Motorcycle Club opened the shows in Wichita and Missoula. Three Days Grace opened both concerts in Regina. Blue October opened for them in Nampa, Idaho.

The two shows in San Francisco were supported by Metallica, who said they were "honoured" to break a seventeen-year span of not performing an opening show, in order to open for the Stones. The Stones acknowledged this gesture by giving them 75 minutes per show, instead of the usual 45 to 60 minutes. They were also Metallica's only dates that year as they had planned to take 2005 off from touring.

Guns N' Roses were scheduled to open for the Stones for two dates in Germany, whilst on one of their Chinese Democracy Tour pre-legs. However, due to Keith Richards' fall from a tree, the shows were cancelled.

Van Morrison was the supporting act in Nijmegen, Netherlands, as well as in Oakland, California. Due to heavy rain his amps, etc. were getting wet, so he was forced to stop after two songs.

== Tour dates ==
Date	City	Country	Venue	Opening act(s)
North America
10 August 2005	Toronto	Canada	Phoenix Concert Theatre	The Trews
21 August 2005	Boston	United States	Fenway Park	Black Eyed Peas
23 August 2005	Boston	United States	Fenway Park	Black Eyed Peas
26 August 2005	East Hartford	United States	Rentschler Field	Maroon 5
28 August 2005	Ottawa	Canada	Frank Clair Stadium	Les Trois Accords; Our Lady Peace
31 August 2005	Detroit	United States	Comerica Park	Maroon 5
3 September 2005	Moncton	Canada	Magnetic Hill Concert Site	Maroon 5 The Tragically Hip; Les Trois Accords; Our Lady Peace
6 September 2005	St. Paul	United States	Xcel Energy Center	Buddy Guy
8 September 2005	Milwaukee	United States	Bradley Center	Buddy Guy
10 September 2005	Chicago	United States	Soldier Field	Los Lonely Boys; The Blues Brothers; The Have Love Will Travel Revue
13 September 2005	New York City	United States	Madison Square Garden	Alanis Morissette
15 September 2005	East Rutherford	United States	Giants Stadium	Alanis Morissette
17 September 2005	Albany	United States	Pepsi Arena	Alanis Morissette
24 September 2005	Columbus	United States	Nationwide Arena	Beck
26 September 2005	Toronto	Canada	Rogers Centre	Beck
28 September 2005	Pittsburgh	United States	PNC Park	Pearl Jam
1 October 2005	Hershey	United States	Hersheypark Stadium	Beck
3 October 2005	Washington, D.C.	United States	MCI Center	John Mayer Trio
6 October 2005	Charlottesville	United States	Scott Stadium	Trey Anastasio
8 October 2005	Durham	United States	Wallace Wade Stadium	Trey Anastasio
10 October 2005	Philadelphia	United States	Wachovia Center	John Mayer Trio
12 October 2005	Philadelphia	United States	Wachovia Center	John Mayer Trio
15 October 2005	Atlanta	United States	Philips Arena	Wilco
17 October 2005	Miami	United States	American Airlines Arena	Joss Stone
19 October 2005	Tampa	United States	St. Pete Times Forum	Joss Stone
21 October 2005	Charlotte	United States	Charlotte Bobcats Arena	Joss Stone
28 October 2005	Calgary	Canada	Pengrowth Saddledome	Joss Stone
30 October 2005	Seattle	United States	KeyArena	Mötley Crüe
1 November 2005	Portland	United States	Rose Garden Arena	Mötley Crüe
4 November 2005	Anaheim	United States	Angel Stadium of Anaheim	Toots and the Maytals
6 November 2005	Los Angeles	United States	Hollywood Bowl	Joss Stone
8 November 2005	Los Angeles	United States	Hollywood Bowl	Joss Stone
11 November 2005	San Diego	United States	Petco Park	Toots and the Maytals
13 November 2005	San Francisco	United States	SBC Park	Metallica; Everclear
15 November 2005	San Francisco	United States	SBC Park	Metallica; Everclear
18 November 2005	Las Vegas	United States	MGM Grand Garden Arena	Jason Mraz
20 November 2005	Fresno	United States	Save Mart Center	Jason Mraz
22 November 2005	Salt Lake City	United States	Delta Center	Jason Mraz
24 November 2005	Denver	United States	Pepsi Center	Jason Mraz
27 November 2005	Glendale	United States	Glendale Arena	Jason Mraz
29 November 2005	Dallas	United States	American Airlines Center	Delbert McClinton
1 December 2005	Houston	United States	Toyota Center	Los Lonely Boys
3 December 2005	Memphis	United States	FedExForum	Los Lonely Boys
10 January 2006	Montreal	Canada	Bell Centre	Anik Jean
13 January 2006	Boston	United States	TD Banknorth Garden	Sloan
15 January 2006	Boston	United States	TD Banknorth Garden	Sloan
18 January 2006	New York City	United States	Madison Square Garden	Metric
20 January 2006	New York City	United States	Madison Square Garden	Metric
23 January 2006	Chicago	United States	United Center	Antigone Rising
25 January 2006	Chicago	United States	United Center	Antigone Rising
27 January 2006	St. Louis	United States	Savvis Center	Soulive
29 January 2006	Omaha	United States	Qwest Center Omaha	Brooks and Dunn
1 February 2006	Baltimore	United States	1st Mariner Arena	Antigone Rising
5 February 2006^{[A]}	Detroit	United States	Ford Field	N/A
8 February 2006	Atlanta	United States	Philips Arena	Soulive
11 February 2006	San Juan, Puerto Rico	United States	Coliseo de Puerto Rico	Juan Luis Guerra
South America
18 February 2006	Rio de Janeiro	Brazil	Copacabana Beach	Titãs
21 February 2006	Buenos Aires	Argentina	River Plate Stadium	Los Piojos; Las Pelotas; La 25
23 February 2006	Buenos Aires	Argentina	River Plate Stadium	Los Piojos; Las Pelotas; La 25
North America
26 February 2006	Mexico City	Mexico	Foro Sol	Fobia
1 March 2006	Monterrey	Mexico	Estadio Universitario	Alejandra Guzmán
4 March 2006	Paradise	United States	MGM Grand Garden Arena	Queens of the Stone Age
6 March 2006	Inglewood	United States	The Forum	Queens of the Stone Age
9 March 2006	North Little Rock	United States	Alltel Arena	Merle Haggard
12 March 2006	Sunrise	United States	BankAtlantic Center	The Meters
14 March 2006	New York City	United States	Radio City Music Hall	The B-52's
Asia
22 March 2006	Tokyo	Japan	Tokyo Dome	Richie Kotzen
24 March 2006	Tokyo	Japan	Tokyo Dome	Richie Kotzen
29 March 2006	Sapporo	Japan	Sapporo Dome	Richie Kotzen
2 April 2006	Saitama	Japan	Saitama Super Arena	Richie Kotzen
5 April 2006	Nagoya	Japan	Nagoya Dome	Richie Kotzen
8 April 2006	Shanghai	China	Shanghai Grand Stage	Cui Jian
Oceania
11 April 2006	Sydney	Australia	Telstra Stadium	The Living End
13 April 2006	Melbourne	Australia	Rod Laver Arena	Airbourne
16 April 2006	Auckland	New Zealand	Western Springs Stadium	Nickelback
18 April 2006	Wellington	New Zealand	Westpac Stadium	Nickelback
Europe
11 July 2006	Milan	Italy	San Siro	Feeder
14 July 2006	Vienna	Austria	Ernst-Happel-Stadion	Paolo Nutini
16 July 2006	Munich	Germany	Munich Olympic Stadium	Starsailor
19 July 2006	Hanover	Germany	AWD-Arena	Starsailor
21 July 2006	Berlin	Germany	Berlin Olympic Stadium	Feeder
23 July 2006	Cologne	Germany	RheinEnergieStadion	Razorlight
28 July 2006	Saint-Denis	France	Stade de France	Razorlight
31 July 2006	Amsterdam	Netherlands	Amsterdam Arena	Toots and the Maytals
3 August 2006	Stuttgart	Germany	Gottlieb-Daimler-Stadion	Simple Minds
5 August 2006	Zürich	Switzerland	Dübendorf Airfield	Love Bugs; Kasabian; Patrouille Suisse
8 August 2006	Nice	France	Stade Charles-Ehrmann	Kasabian
12 August 2006	Porto	Portugal	Estádio do Dragão	The Dandy Warhols
20 August 2006	London	England	Twickenham Stadium	Feeder
22 August 2006	London	England	Twickenham Stadium	Charlatans
25 August 2006	Glasgow	Scotland	Hampden Park	Charlatans
27 August 2006	Sheffield	England	Don Valley Stadium	Paolo Nutini
29 August 2006	Cardiff	Wales	Millennium Stadium	The Kooks
1 September 2006	Bergen	Norway	Koengen	Maxïmo Park
3 September 2006	Horsens	Denmark	CASA Arena Horsens	Maxïmo Park
North America
20 September 2006	Foxborough	United States	Gillette Stadium	Kanye West
23 September 2006	Halifax	Canada	Halifax Common	Alice Cooper; Sloan; Kanye West
27 September 2006	East Rutherford	United States	Giants Stadium	Kanye West
29 September 2006	Louisville	United States	Churchill Downs	Alice Cooper
1 October 2006	Wichita	United States	Cessna Stadium	Black Rebel Motorcycle Club
4 October 2006	Missoula	United States	Washington–Grizzly Stadium	Black Rebel Motorcycle Club
6 October 2006	Regina	Canada	Mosaic Stadium at Taylor Field	Three Days Grace
8 October 2006	Regina	Canada	Mosaic Stadium at Taylor Field	Three Days Grace
11 October 2006	Chicago	United States	Soldier Field	Elvis Costello
17 October 2006	Seattle	United States	Qwest Field	Dave Matthews Band
20 October 2006	El Paso	United States	Sun Bowl Stadium	Dave Matthews Band
22 October 2006	Austin	United States	Zilker Park	Ian McLagan and the Bump Band; Los Lonely Boys
29 October 2006	New York City	United States	Beacon Theatre	Buddy Guy
1 November 2006	New York City	United States	Beacon Theatre	Buddy Guy
6 November 2006	Oakland	United States	Oakland–Alameda County Coliseum	Van Morrison
8 November 2006	Glendale	United States	University of Phoenix Stadium	Alice Cooper
11 November 2006	Las Vegas	United States	MGM Grand Garden Arena	Bonnie Raitt
14 November 2006	Nampa	United States	Idaho Center	Blue October
17 November 2006	Atlantic City	United States	Boardwalk Hall	Soulive
22 November 2006	Los Angeles	United States	Dodger Stadium	Bonnie Raitt
25 November 2006	Vancouver	Canada	BC Place Stadium	Bonnie Raitt
Europe
5 June 2007	Werchter	Belgium	Werchter Festival Ground	Van Morrison
8 June 2007	Nijmegen	Netherlands	Goffertpark	Daniel Lohues and the Louisiana Blues Club; Van Morrison (Cut short due to heavy showers)
10 June 2007^{[B]}	Newport	England	Seaclose Park	Siniez; The Hedrons; Country Joe McDonald; Melanie C James Morrison; Paolo Nutini; The Fratellis; Keane
13 June 2007	Frankfurt	Germany	Commerzbank-Arena	Starsailor
16 June 2007	Saint-Denis	France	Stade de France	Starsailor
18 June 2007	Lyon	France	Stade de Gerland	Starsailor
21 June 2007	Barcelona	Spain	Estadi Olímpic Lluís Companys	Loquillo y los Trogloditas; Biffy Clyro
23 June 2007	San Sebastián	Spain	Anoeta Stadium	Zentricc; Arno Carstens
25 June 2007	Lisbon	Portugal	Estádio José Alvalade	Jet
28 June 2007	Madrid	Spain	Vicente Calderón Stadium	Loquillo y los Trogloditas; Jet
30 June 2007	El Ejido	Spain	Estadio Municipal Santo Domingo	Loquillo y los Trogloditas; Jet
6 July 2007	Rome	Italy	Stadio Olimpico	Biffy Clyro
9 July 2007	Budva	Montenegro	Jaz Beach	Dado Topic & Time; Regina; The Thirst
14 July 2007	Belgrade	Serbia	Ušće Park	Električni Orgazam; The Answer
17 July 2007	Bucharest	Romania	Lia Manoliu Stadium	Iris; Charlatans
20 July 2007	Budapest	Hungary	Ferenc Puskás Stadium	Charlatans
22 July 2007	Brno	Czech Republic	Brno Exhibition Centre	Charlatans
25 July 2007	Warsaw	Poland	Służewiec Hippodrome	Steve Harley and Cockney Rebel
28 July 2007	Saint Petersburg	Russia	Palace Square	Steve Harley and Cockney Rebel
1 August 2007	Helsinki	Finland	Helsinki Olympic Stadium	Toots and the Maytals
3 August 2007	Gothenburg	Sweden	Ullevi Stadium	Toots and the Maytals
5 August 2007	Copenhagen	Denmark	Parken Stadium	Toots and the Maytals
8 August 2007	Oslo	Norway	Valle Hovin	The Dandy Warhols
11 August 2007	Lausanne	Switzerland	Stade Olympique de la Pontaise	The Dandy Warhols
13 August 2007	Düsseldorf	Germany	LTU Arena	The Answer
15 August 2007	Hamburg	Germany	AOL Arena	Starsailor
18 August 2007	Slane	Ireland	Slane Castle	The Hold Steady, Frankie Gavin, Tinariwen, Charlatans
21 August 2007	London	England	The O_{2} Arena	The Kooks
23 August 2007	London	England	The O_{2} Arena	Jet
26 August 2007	London	England	The O_{2} Arena	The Enemy

Festivals and other miscellaneous performances
^{A} This concert was a part of "Super Bowl XL"
^{B} This concert was a part of "Isle of Wight Festival"

== Box office score data ==
Venue	City	Tickets sold / available	Gross revenue
SBC Park	San Francisco	87,054 / 88,264 (99%)	$11,210,733
MGM Grand Garden Arena	Las Vegas	13,898 / 13,898 (100%)	$4,053,289
Save Mart Center	Fresno	13,378 / 13,378 (100%)	$2,324,305
Pepsi Center	Denver	15,091 / 15,385 (98%)	$2,707,590
Jobing.com Arena	Glendale	14,784 / 14,784 (100%)	$2,553,855
American Airlines Center	Dallas	15,351 / 15,351 (100%)	$2,782,740
Toyota Center	Houston	15,251 / 15,251 (100%)	$2,616,385
FedExForum	Memphis	14,688 / 14,688 (100%)	$2,294,755
Twickenham Stadium	London	100,540 / 109,892 (91%)	$13,526,368
Hampden Park	Glasgow	31,495 / 33,506 (94%)	$4,022,000
Don Valley Stadium	Sheffield	34,034 / 34,741 (98%)	$4,596,417
Millennium Stadium	Cardiff	48,988 / 57,224 (86%)	$5,534,100
Koengen	Bergen	20,375 / 20,375 (100%)	$3,169,218
Horsens Forum	Horsens	84,588 / 85,300 (99%)	$8,838,178
Gillette Stadium	Foxborough	44,115 / 45,285 (97%)	$4,042,193
Halifax Common	Halifax	50,000 / 50,000 (100%)	$4,322,252
Giants Stadium	East Rutherford	48,715 / 48,715 (100%)	$6,146,539
Churchill Downs	Louisville	40,912 / 40,912 (100%)	$5,060,297
TOTAL		693,257 / 716,949 (97%)	$89,801,214

== Gallery ==
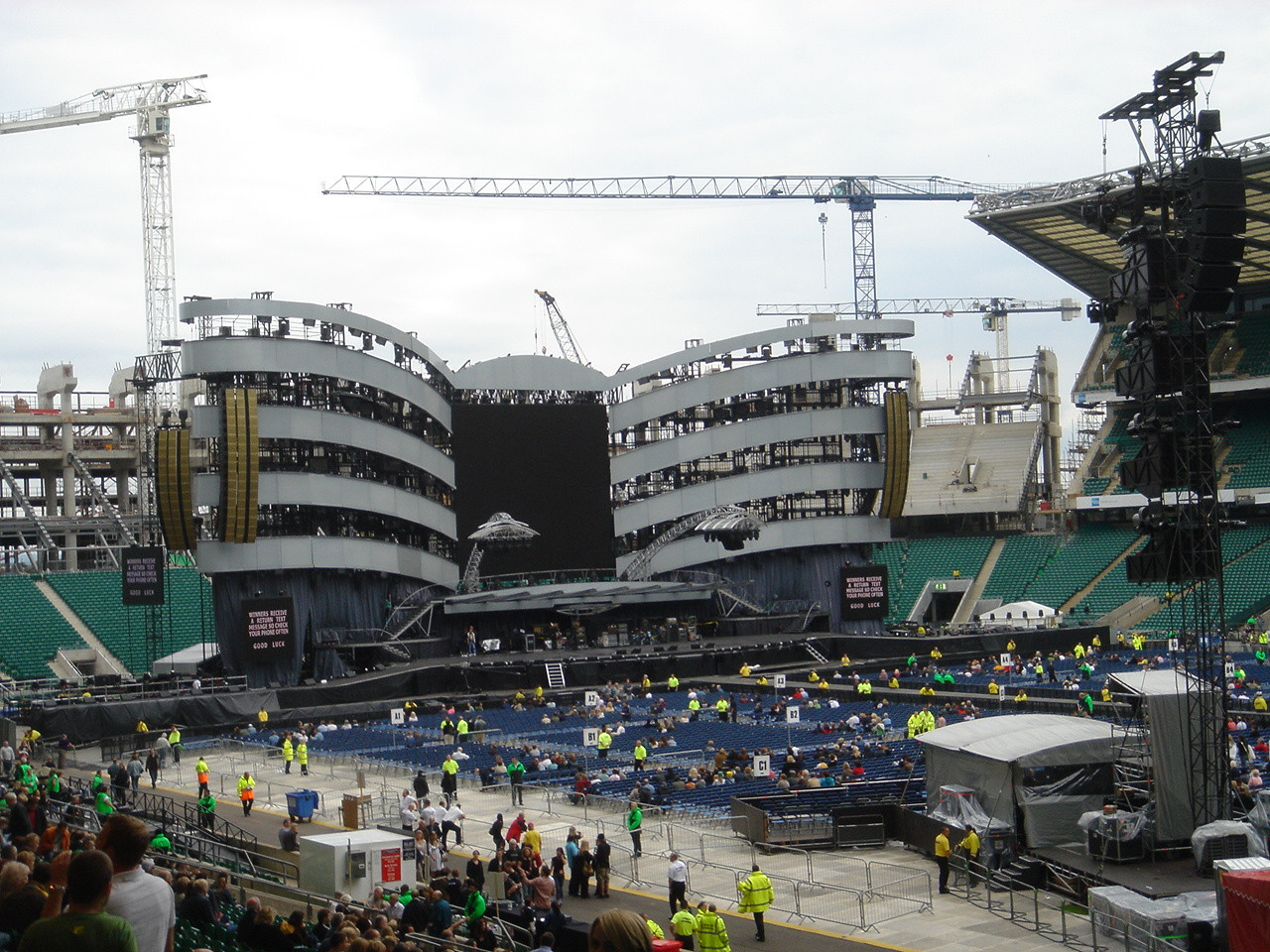
Bigger Bang stage being set up, Twickenham, London, England, August 2006.

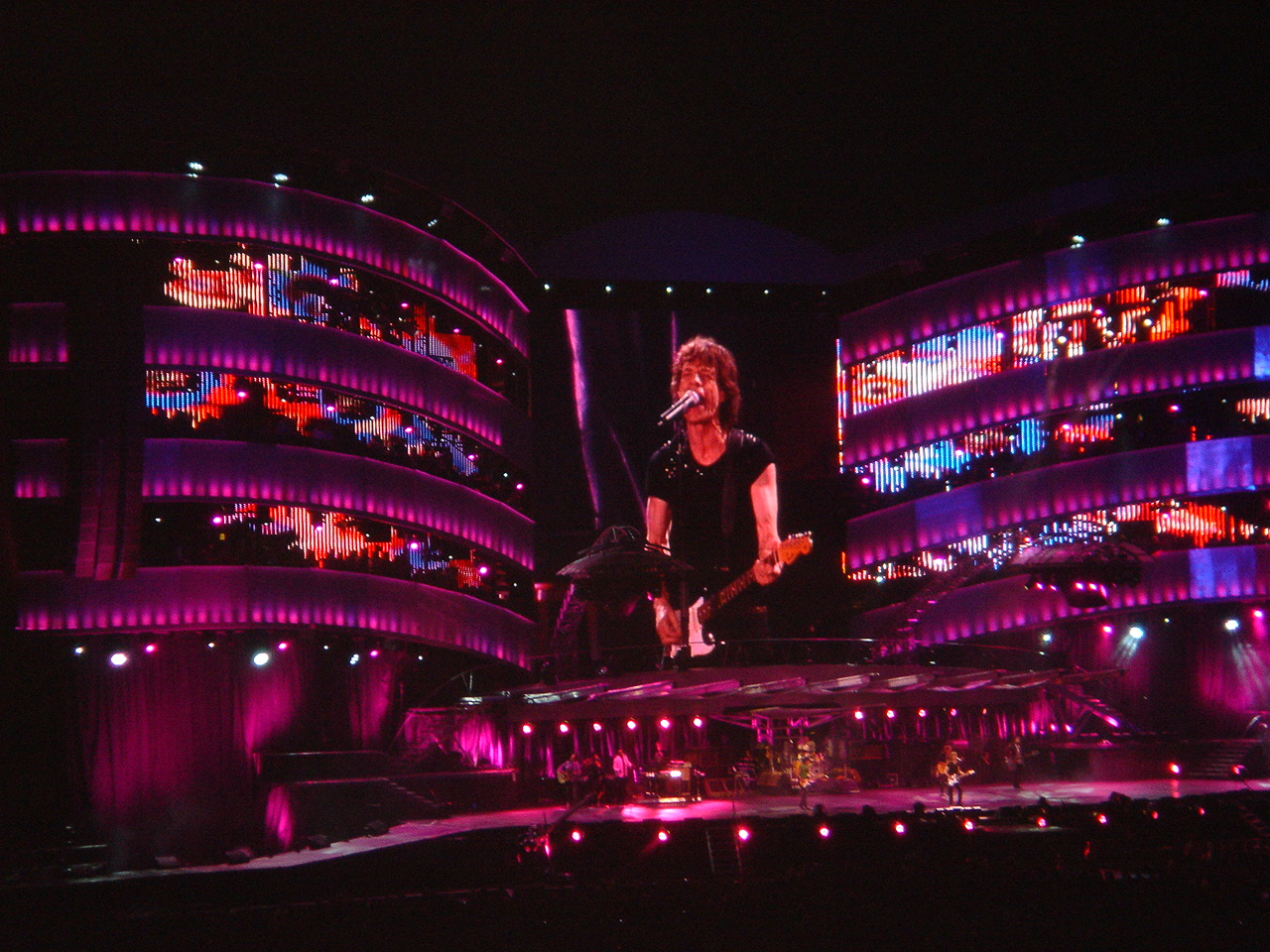
Stones on stage, Bigger Bang Tour, Twickenham, London, England, August 2006.

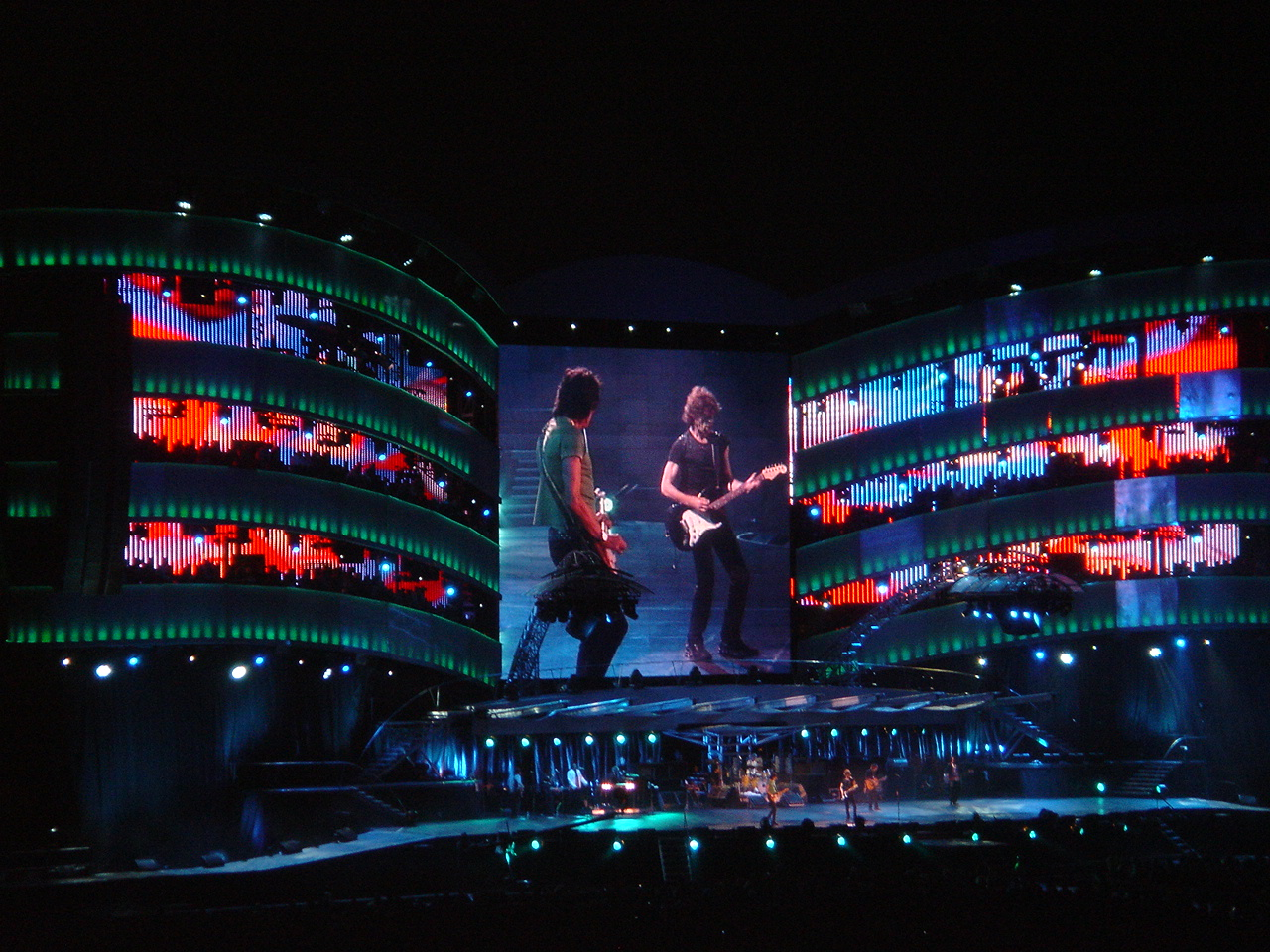
Stones on stage, Bigger Bang Tour, Twickenham, London, England, August 2006.

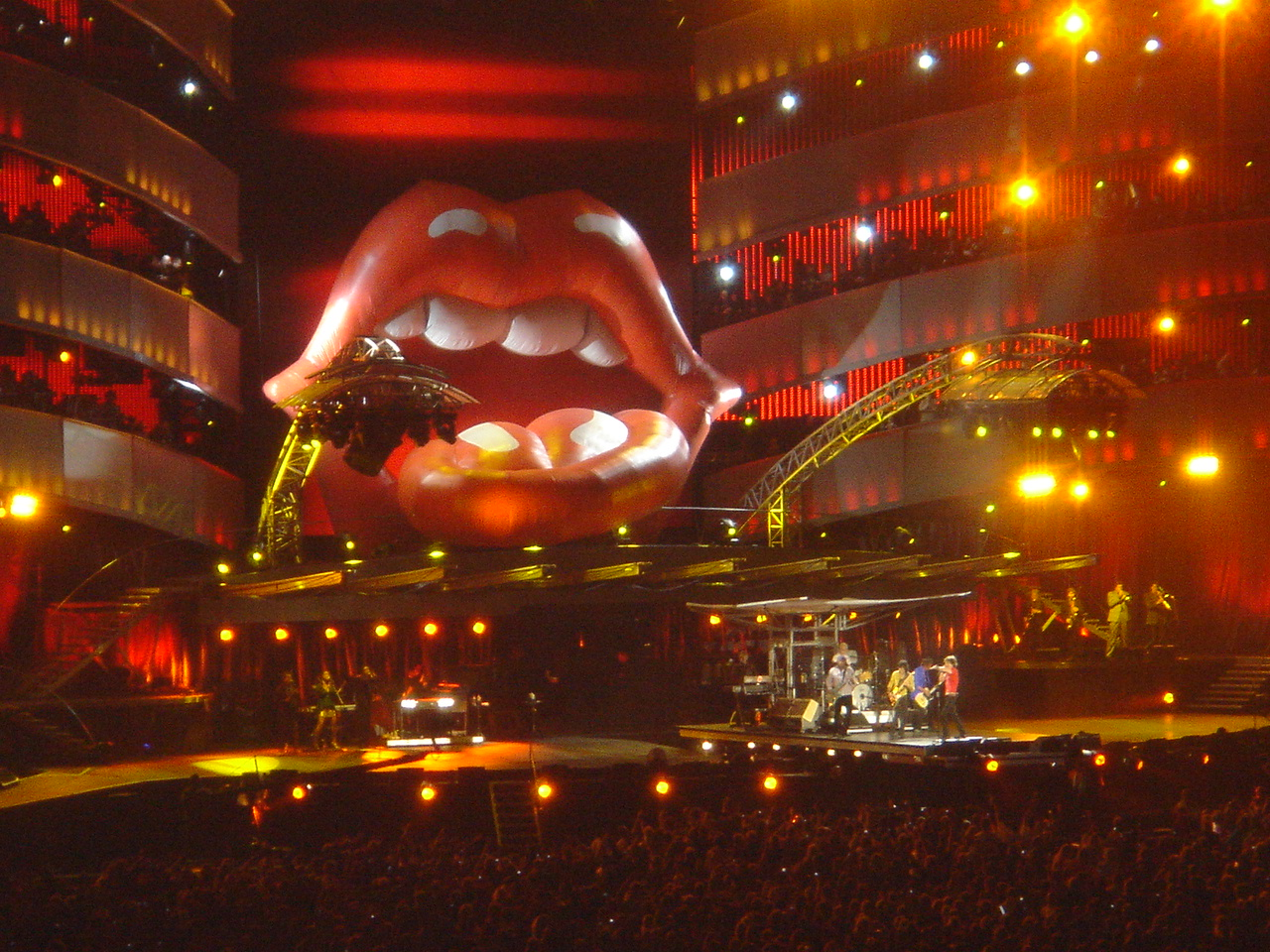
Stones on stage, Bigger Bang Tour, Twickenham, London, England, August 2006.

== See also ==
- List of the Rolling Stones concert tours
- List of highest-grossing concert tours
- List of highest-attended concerts
- List of most-attended concert tours
- The Rolling Stones first concert in China
