= The Fully Down =

Canadian rock band

- Origin: Ottawa, Ontario, Canada
- Genres: Post-hardcore, Rock and roll, Punk rock
- Years active: 1999–2008
- Labels: Fearless Records; Bullion Records; Pop Culture Records
- Past members: Justin Camarena; Richard Latour; Alex Newman; George Hadji; Dan Hay; Kris Parks

The Fully Down was a Canadian rock band that was formed in Ottawa, Ontario, in 1999, with the touring lineup coming together in 2003.

== History ==
The band's original lineup recorded; but never released a record titled The Way of the Fully Down.

=== No Fate... But What We Make for Ourselves (2004) ===
The band released the album No Fate... But What We Make for Ourselves in June 2004 on Ottawa's Pop Culture Records and they went directly on three weeks of the Vans Warped Tour 2004 in support of it. The band also toured to promote the record extensively throughout the east coast Provinces of Canada, Quebec and Southern Ontario. The record was also later released in Japan on Bullion Records.

=== Don't Get Lost In A Movement (2005–2006) ===
The Fully Down signed to Fearless Records (Culver City, California) in August 2005. Their Fearless Records debut, Don't Get Lost In A Movement was released throughout North America on November 22, 2005. The band headed directly to the United States for a countrywide tour in support of the record with Four Year Strong (Worcester, Massachusetts) and Maida.

The following spring, the band headed out across Canada on Tour and Loathing headlined by Protest The Hero and including A Wilhelm Scream, Bayside and The Spill Canvas. The tour ended halfway through April, and they began touring with Boy Sets Fire (Newark, Delaware) and Versus the Mirror until the end of May. The summer of 2006 was spent back on the Vans Warped Tour; as the band played all 50 dates on the Smartpunk stage.

In late 2006, the band appeared on the Radio Rebellion Tour in support of Norma Jean (Douglasville, Georgia), Between the Buried and Me, Fear Before the March of Flames and Misery Signals. In December they flew to Japan in support of Bodyjar, Bigwig, and FACT (Ibaraki Prefecture, Japan) starting in Osaka and finishing up in Tokyo.

In December 2006, vocalist Gab Bouchard announced that he was leaving the band. He played his last show on December 27, at The Salt Lounge in London, Ontario.

The Fully Down announced Justin Camarena, of Tough Call (Detroit, Michigan) would be taking on Lead Vocals after a six-month hiatus. Camarena was a founding member of the punk rock band Tough Call, which had a loyal following from their inception in 2003 until they disbanded following Justin's departure to join The Fully Down. During that time they recorded over forty songs for their next record of which a few demos where posted on Myspace and Purevolume.

=== Breakup and final concert ===
On July 30, 2008, the band posted a blog entry on their Myspace page announcing that they were breaking up, with their final show occurring at Zaphod Beeblebrox in Ottawa on August 23, 2008.

=== 2008–present ===
Since then, a few of the band members have started other projects. Dan Hay (guitar) joined Ottawa band Amos the Transparent, Alex Newman (bass) moved to London, Ontario, to start his new band, The Bad Ideas but has since moved back to Ottawa, Ontario.

== Lineup ==
Richard Latour - drums
Alex Newman - bass
George Hadji - guitar
Dan Hay - guitar
Kris Parks - guitar
Justin Camarena - vocals

== Former members ==
Gab Bouchard - vocals (2003–2006)
Joe Brownrigg - vocals, guitar (1999–2002)
Dustin Wenzel - drums, backup vocals (1999–2002)
Aaron Libbey - vocals (2002)

== Discography ==
| Title | Release date | Label |
|---|---|---|
| The Way Of The Fully Down | (Unreleased) | Independent |
| No Fate...But What We Make for Ourselves | 2004 | Pop Culture Records |
| Don't Get Lost In A Movement | 2005 | Fearless Records |

== Tour dates ==
| Date | City | Country | Venue |
|---|---|---|---|
| July 12, 2005 | Vancouver, British Columbia | Canada | Thunderbird Stadium |
| July 14, 2005 | Calgary, Alberta | Canada | Race City Speedway |
| July 15, 2005 | Bozeman, Montana | United States | Gallatin County Fairgrounds |
| July 16, 2005 | Salt Lake City, Utah | United States | Utah State Fairgrounds |
| July 17, 2005 | Denver, Colorado | United States | Invesco Field |
| June 15, 2006 | Columbia, Maryland | United States | Merriweather Post Pavilion |
| June 16, 2006 | Columbus, Ohio | United States | Germain Amphitheatre |
| June 17, 2006 | Milwaukee, Wisconsin | United States | Marcus Amphitheatre |
| June 18, 2006 | Minneapolis, Minnesota | United States | Hubert H. Humphrey Metrodome |
| June 19, 2006 | Bonner Springs, Kansas | United States | Verizon Wireless Amphitheatre |
| June 21, 2006 | Nashville, Tennessee | United States | Starwood Amphitheatre |
| June 22, 2006 | Jacksonville, Florida | United States | Jacksonville Fairgrounds |
| June 23, 2006 | St. Petersburg, Florida | United States | Vinoy Park |
| June 24, 2006 | Miami, Florida | United States | Bayfront Park Amphitheatre |
| June 25, 2006 | Orlando, Florida | United States | Tinker Field |
| June 26, 2006 | Charleston, South Carolina | United States | Exchange Park |
| June 27, 2006 | Raleigh, North Carolina | United States | Alltel Pavilion at Walnut Creek |
| June 28, 2006 | Atlanta, Georgia | United States | Hi Fi Amphitheater |
| June 30, 2006 | Houston, Texas | United States | Reliant Center |
| July 1, 2006 | Dallas, Texas | United States | Smirnoff Music Centre |
| July 2, 2006 | Selma, Texas | United States | Verizon Wireless Amphitheatre |
| July 3, 2006 | Las Cruces, New Mexico | United States | NMSU Practice Field |
| July 4, 2006 | Phoenix, Arizona | United States | Cricket Wireless Pavilion |
| July 6, 2006 | Chula Vista, California | United States | Coors Amphitheatre |
| July 7, 2006 | Pomona, California | United States | Fairplex Park |
| July 8, 2006 | San Francisco, California | United States | Pier 30/32 |
| July 9, 2006 | Fresno, California | United States | Save Mart Arena |
| July 11, 2006 | Ventura, California | United States | Seaside Park |
| July 12, 2006 | Los Angeles, California | United States | Dodger Stadium |
| July 13, 2006 | Marysville, California | United States | Sleep Train Amphitheatre |
| July 14, 2006 | Boise, Idaho | United States | Idaho Center Amphitheatre |
| July 15, 2006 | George, Washington | United States | Gorge Amphitheatre |
| July 16, 2006 | St. Helens, Oregon | United States | Columbia Meadows |
| July 18, 2006 | Vancouver, British Columbia | Canada | Thunderbird Stadium |
| July 20, 2006 | Calgary, Alberta | Canada | Race City Speedway |
| July 22, 2006 | Salt Lake City, Utah | United States | Utah State Fairgrounds |
| July 23, 2006 | Denver, Colorado | United States | Invesco Field |
| July 25, 2006 | Maryland Heights, Missouri | United States | UMB Bank Pavilion |
| July 26, 2006 | Cincinnati, Ohio | United States | Riverbend Music Center |
| July 27, 2006 | Pittsburgh, Pennsylvania | United States | Post Gazette Pavilion |
| July 28, 2006 | Noblesville, Indiana | United States | Verizon Wireless Music Center |
| July 29, 2006 | Detroit, Michigan | United States | Comerica Park |
| July 30, 2006 | Tinley Park, Illinois | United States | Tweeter Center Chicago |
| August 1, 2006 | Darien, New York | United States | Darien Lake PAC |
| August 2, 2006 | Fitchburg, Massachusetts | United States | Fitchburg Airport |
| August 3, 2006 | Camden, New Jersey | United States | Tweeter Center at the Waterfront |
| August 4, 2006 | Scranton, Pennsylvania | United States | Toyota Pavilion at Montage Mountain |
| August 5, 2006 | Uniondale, New York | United States | Nassau Veterans Memorial Coliseum |
| August 6, 2006 | Old Bridge, New Jersey | United States | Englishtown Raceway |
| August 8, 2006 | Charlotte, North Carolina | United States | Verizon Wireless Amphitheatre |
| August 9, 2006 | Virginia Beach, Virginia | United States | Verizon Wireless Amphitheatre |
| August 10, 2006 | Washington, DC | United States | Nissan Pavilion |
| August 11, 2006 | Cleveland, Ohio | United States | Tower City Amphitheater |
| August 12, 2006 | Barrie, Ontario | Canada | Park Place |
| August 13, 2006 | Montreal, Quebec | Canada | Parc Jean-Drapeau |
| August 23, 2008 | Ottawa, Ontario | Canada | Zaphod Beeblebrox |
