= Rough Justice (Rolling Stones song) =

Single by The Rolling Stones

from the album A Bigger Bang
- A-side: "Streets of Love" (double A-side)
- Released: August 22, 2005
- Recorded: June 2005
- Studio: La Fourchette, France
- Genre: Hard rock
- Length: 3:12
- Label: Virgin
- Songwriter: Jagger–Richards
- Producers: Don Was; The Glimmer Twins

The Rolling Stones singles chronology
"Sympathy for the Devil (remix)" (2003)	"Rough Justice" / "Streets of Love" (2005)	"Rain Fall Down" (2005)

"Rough Justice" is a song by the English rock band the Rolling Stones that was released as a double A-side single with "Streets of Love" from their 2005 album A Bigger Bang. It is the opening track from the album. The single was released on 22 August 2005, prior to the album.

== History ==
Written by Jagger–Richards, "Rough Justice" was a heavily collaborative effort like many of the lead singer and guitarist's latter-day compositions. On the writing, Richards said in 2005, "That came to me in my sleep. It's almost like 'Satisfaction'. Yeah, I almost sort of woke up and said, 'Where's my guitar?' Sometimes you do dream a riff, you know? I had to get up, and it's really hard to get me up. Once I go down, I go down, you know? But, I mean, it's only a song that could get me up and start running around the room, 'Where's my guitar, where did I put my guitar, before I forget it?' I don't often remember dreams, only when they're musical."

A straight ahead rocker, but sets the scene of a long time, up and down, love affair between the singer and the subject:

One time you were my baby chicken, Now you've grown into a fox; Once upon a time I was your little rooster, But now I'm just one of your cocks.

It's rough justice, oh yeah, We never thought it risky; It's rough justice, But you know I'll never break your heart; You're feeling loose and lusty, So if you really want me, Yeah, it's rough justice; And you know I'll never break your heart.

=== Recording ===
Recording began at La Fourchette, Posé sur Cisse, France in June 2005. With Jagger on lead vocals, Richards plays electric rhythm (including the riff). Ronnie Wood plays the song's distinct electric slide guitar, including the song's opening intro and solo. Charlie Watts plays drums. Additional musicians are included Darryl Jones on bass while Chuck Leavell on play the song's piano.

== Release and aftermath ==
"Rough Justice" was released as a double A-side with "Streets of Love" on 22 August 2005. It charted at number 15 on the UK Singles Chart. In the US, the song peaked at number 25 on the Mainstream Rock Tracks chart and number 5 on the Adult Alternative Songs chart.

Music critic Robert Christgau applauded the song as "a strikingly ironic/acerbic expression of both Jagger's musical gift and his romantic limitations".

The song was performed heavily by the Stones on their A Bigger Bang Tour and is featured on their latest concert DVD release, The Biggest Bang. It was also one of the three songs played by the Stones during the halftime show for Super Bowl XL although the word "cocks" was censored on the ABC broadcast.

It was included in their greatest hits album GRRR!.

== Personnel ==
Credits adapted from album liner notes.

The Rolling Stones

- Mick Jagger – vocals, guitar
- Keith Richards – guitar
- Ronnie Wood – slide guitar
- Charlie Watts – drums

Additional musicians

- Darryl Jones – bass guitar
- Chuck Leavell – piano

== Chart performance ==
Chart (2005)	Peak position
UK Singles (Official Charts)	15
US Billboard Heritage Rock	1
US Mainstream Rock (Billboard)	25
US Adult Alternative Airplay (Billboard)	5
