= Barrymore's =

Nightclub and concert venue in Ottawa, Ontario, Canada

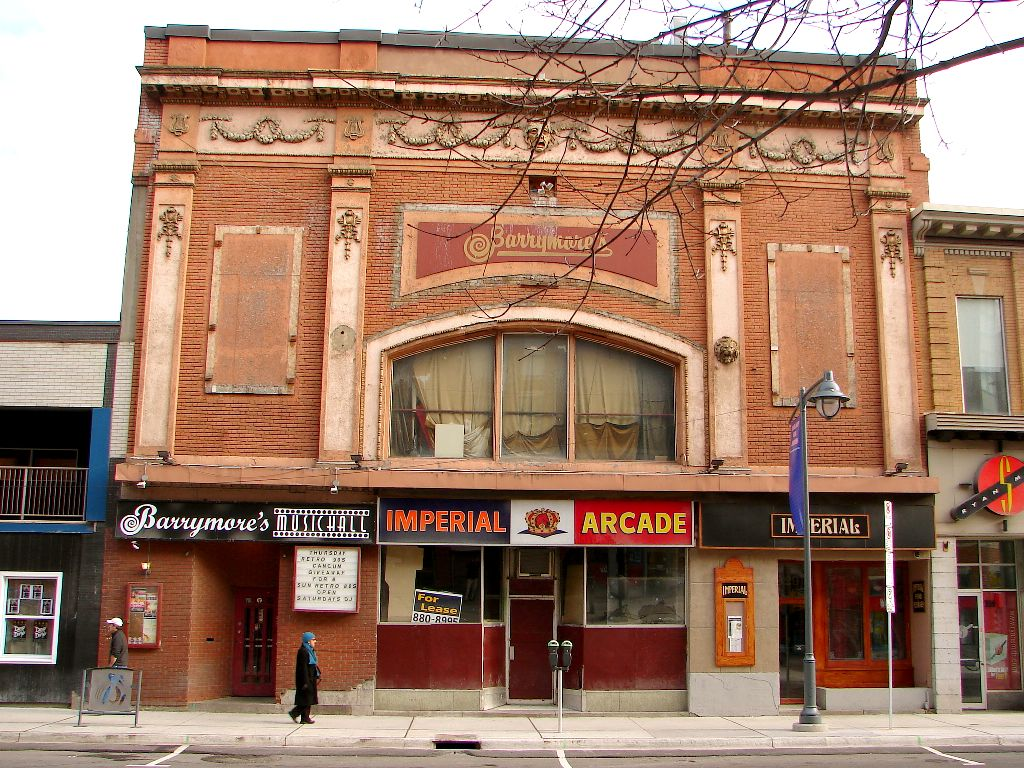
- Barrymore's
- Interactive map of Barrymore's
- Address: 323 Bank Street; Ottawa, Ontario; K2P 1X9
- Coordinates: 45.414443°N 75.695200°W
- Type: Nightclub
- Event: Alternative

Construction
- Opened: 1978

Website
- barrymores.on.ca

Barrymore's was a nightclub and concert venue located in Ottawa, Ontario, Canada.

The club was first opened in 1978, by Gordon & Sherry Rhodes in the city's former Imperial Theatre on Bank Street. It was considered one of Canada's most important music venues in the 1980s, hosting concerts by noted artists.

The club's owner filed for bankruptcy in 1991 and cancelled the building's operations. It reopened in 1996 after its acquisition by Eugene Haslam, the owner of Zaphod Beeblebrox. Haslam instituted the custom of "theme nights"; Sunday being 80's retro night and Thursdays being retro 90's night. These nights have become two of the most popular nights in Ottawa's nightlife.

In August 2008, scheduled concerts were cancelled and operations suspended due to the apparent sale of the venue to a new owner. Barrymore's reopened on 11 September, and resumed a regular schedule of events after Montreal-based club operator Vince Simeone and George Syriannis became the building's new tenants. Barrymore's is now owned and operated by George Syriannis.

By March 2021, the condition of the building had deteriorated sufficiently that the landlord, Louis Antonakos, was ordered by the City of Ottawa to make urgent repairs or face closure. Later that same month, Antonakos appealed the order.

As of August 2025, the foyer now acts as a cannabis dispensary.

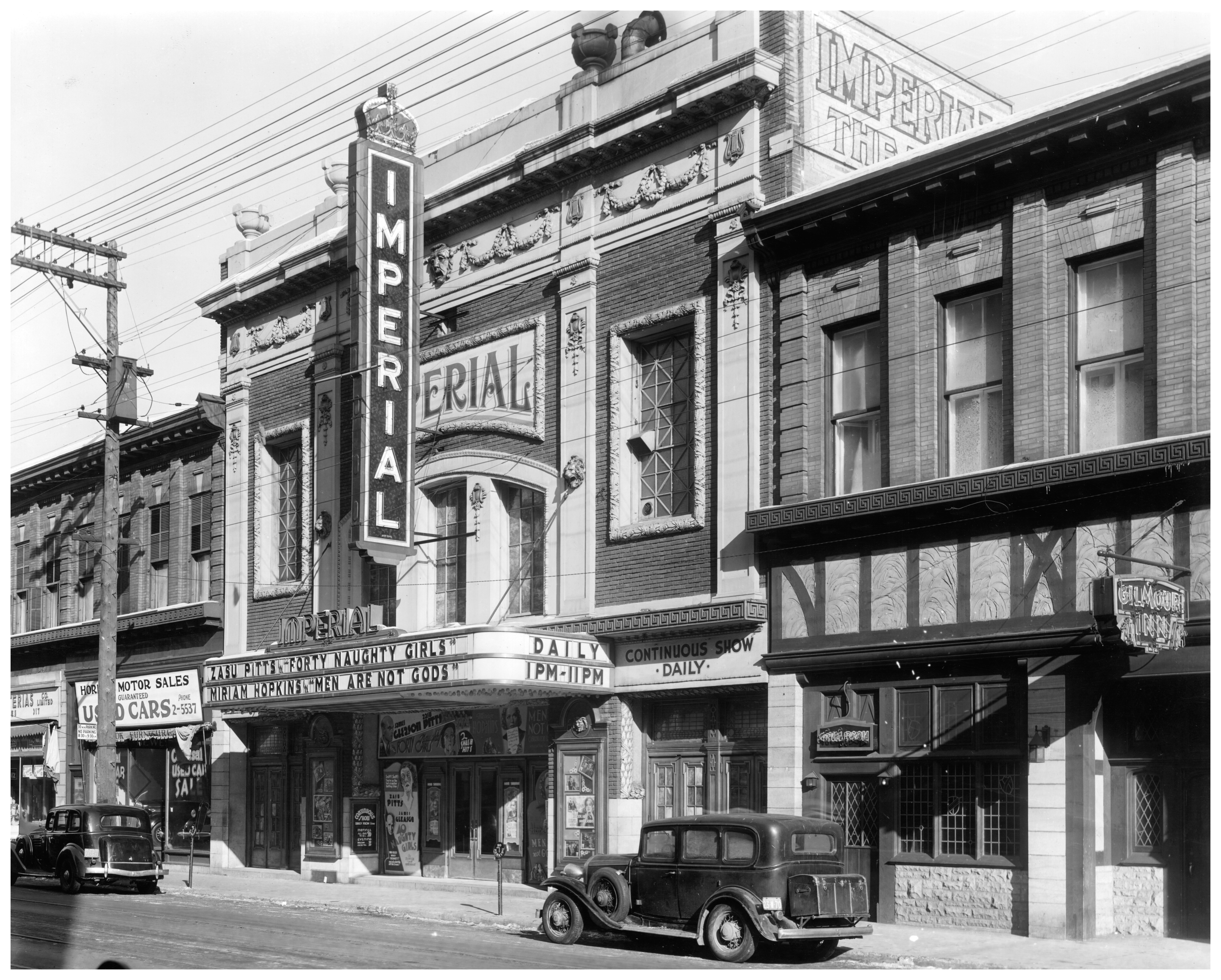
Imperial Theatre, now Barrymore's, 1938

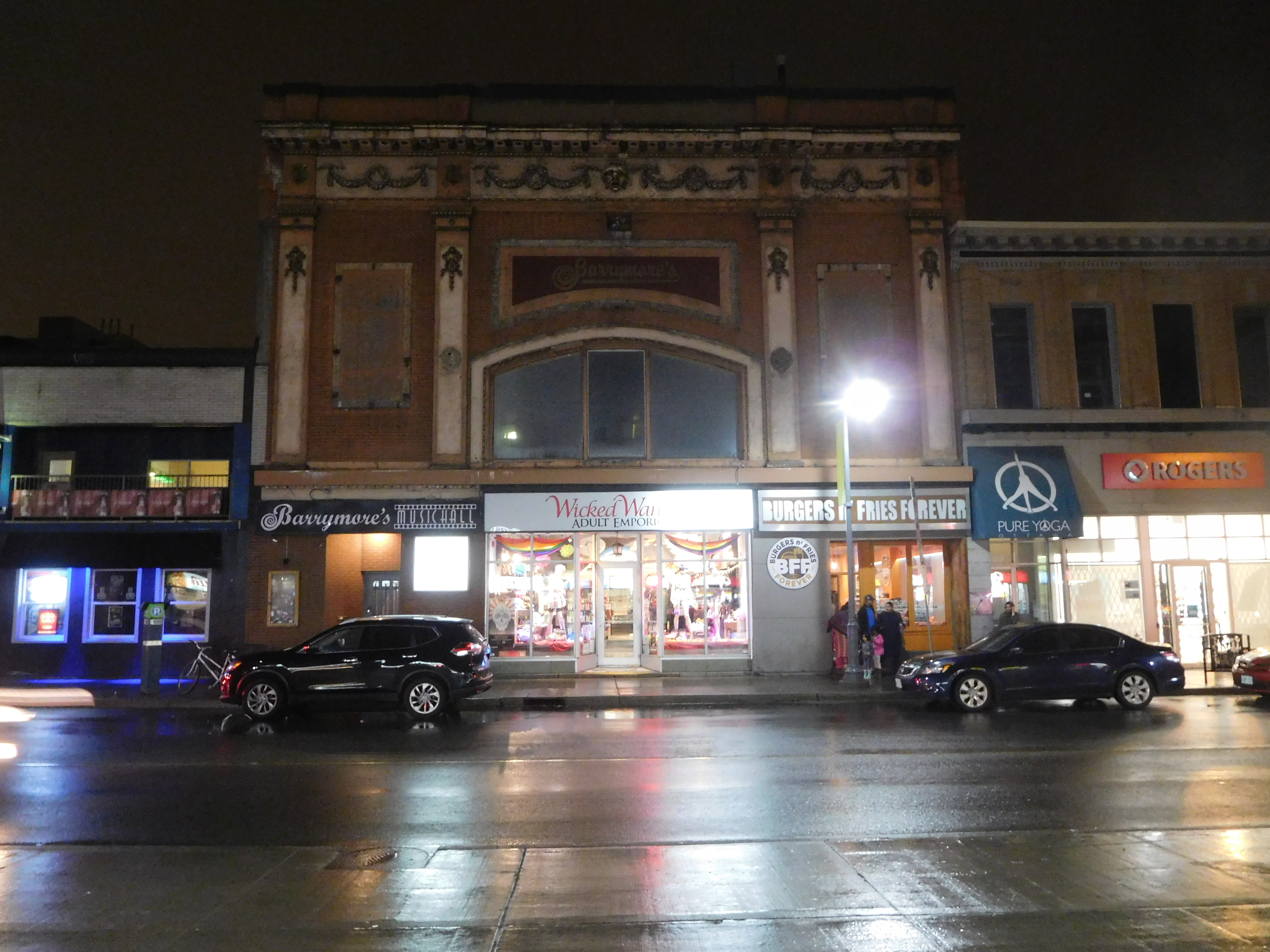
Night view, 2017
