= A Bigger Bang =

Studio album by the Rolling Stones
- Released: 5 September 2005
- Recorded: November 2004; 7–9 March 2005; 6–28 June 2005
- Studios: Château de Fourchette in Pocé-sur-Cisse, France; Ocean Way Recording and The Village Recorder in Los Angeles
- Genres: Hard rock; blues rock
- Length: 64:23
- Labels: Virgin; Rolling Stones
- Producers: Don Was; The Glimmer Twins; Matt Clifford

The Rolling Stones chronology
Live Licks (2004)	A Bigger Bang (2005)	Rarities 1971–2003 (2005)

The Rolling Stones studio album chronology
Bridges to Babylon (1997)	A Bigger Bang (2005)	Blue & Lonesome (2016)

Singles from A Bigger Bang
- 1. "Streets of Love"/"Rough Justice" Released: 22 August 2005; 2. "Rain Fall Down" Released: 5 December 2005; 3. "Biggest Mistake" Released: 21 August 2006

A Bigger Bang is the twenty-second British and the twenty-fourth American studio album by the English rock band the Rolling Stones, released through Virgin Records on 5 September 2005. It was the band's last album of original material recorded entirely with Charlie Watts on drums before his death in 2021.

Unlike their prior effort eight years before, the sprawling and eclectic Bridges to Babylon, which had an array of producers, musical styles, and guest musicians, the Stones set out to make a basic, hard rock album that hearkened back to their 1960s–1970s heyday. A single producer, Don Was, was brought in to co-produce the album alongside the band's principal songwriting and production team of vocalist Mick Jagger and Keith Richards. Joining the two were band members Ronnie Wood on guitar and Charlie Watts on drums, contract players Darryl Jones on bass and Chuck Leavell on keyboards, and multi-instrumentalist Matt Clifford. Most of the basic tracks were recorded as a simple trio of Jagger, Richards, and Watts, with overdubs added later by other players.

The back-to-basics method of recording the album paid off for the Stones, who saw the album reach number three in the US, number two in the UK, and number one in eleven countries around the world. The lead single, "Streets of Love", failed to chart in the US, but was otherwise successful around the world, reaching number 15 in the UK and top-40 in over a dozen other countries. Two other singles were released to moderate worldwide sales. Reviews of the album were generally favourable; while critics noted that the album was not up to the standards of the Stones classic period, it nonetheless was among the best reviewed of their later albums. The follow-up tour, which lasted two years, would become the highest-grossing tour of all time by its completion. A Martin Scorsese-directed concert film titled Shine a Light documented the tour.

== History ==
The album used a stripped-down style reminiscent of Some Girls (1978), but with a harder, more contemporary edge. Although initial reports stated that the Stones had "returned to their roots" with the record, the minimal instrumentation, rough mix, tough blues and "garage" rock hybrid bear certain similarities to the style of contemporary artists like the White Stripes and the Black Keys.

Many songs were recorded with just the core band of Jagger, Richards and Watts. Ronnie Wood was absent from many sessions, playing on only ten of the sixteen tracks, with only occasional contributions from outside musicians comprising the recording of the album. This is also the first album where Jagger plays bass guitar on some tracks.

The Stones said in a statement that the album's title reflects "their fascination with the scientific theory about the origin of the universe."

== Writing and recording ==
Songs for A Bigger Bang were composed by Jagger and Richards in June 2004 at the château de Fourchette, Jagger's chateau in Pocé-sur-Cisse, France. At the château, they learned of Charlie Watts' throat cancer diagnosis and debated about postponing the writing, but ultimately went ahead after determining that Watts was not required to be present until later. As a result of this, Jagger played the drums during early guide track recordings; all but one of these was later rerecorded by Watts, but Jagger's beat remained. Jagger and Richards shared guitar, bass, and keyboard parts between each other. The album was produced by Don Was and the sound engineering was done by Krish Sharma. Mixing for the album was performed by Jack Joseph Puig and Dave Sardy.

=== Lyrical content ===
The song "Sweet Neo Con" is a criticism of the conservative Christian movement in American politics.

"Dangerous Beauty" is widely understood to refer to US Army Reserve Lynndie England, who was convicted of mistreating detainees during the Abu Ghraib torture and prisoner abuse that occurred at the Abu Ghraib prison during the Iraq War.

== Release and reception ==
Professional ratings
Aggregate scores
Source	Rating
Metacritic	73/100
Review scores
Source	Rating
AllMusic	4/5 stars
Blender	4/5 stars
Entertainment Weekly	B−
The Guardian	3/5 stars
Mojo	3/5 stars
NME	6/10
Q	3/5 stars
Rolling Stone	4.5/5 stars
Uncut	5/5 stars
The Village Voice	A−

The first single, "Streets of Love"/"Rough Justice", reached No. 15 on the UK Singles Chart, while A Bigger Bang peaked at No. 2 on the UK Albums Chart.

In August 2005, the Rolling Stones embarked on the 90-show A Bigger Bang Tour in support of the album. It was met with sold-out tickets at every destination, usually within minutes of going on sale. The tour was extended into 2007 because Richards got hurt falling out of a tree in Fiji and required surgery in New Zealand. The tour concluded in August 2007 at the O2 Arena in London.

Critical reaction was mostly positive. The aggregate score of the album by Metacritic was rated 73 out of 100, categorising the reviews as "generally favourable". A Bigger Bang was touted as the best Rolling Stones album in years. Nevertheless, all of the Stones albums since 1989's Steel Wheels had been similarly lauded, and many critics and fans felt that the Stones had yet to record a late-period album truly up to their high standards. It was chosen as one of Amazon.com's Top 100 Editor's Picks of 2005, and ranked the second-best album of the year by Rolling Stone magazine, behind rapper Kanye West's Late Registration. A review by the Associated Press referred to the album as "a winner" that "hammers home the fact that the Rolling Stones still have 'it'".

A Bigger Bang went platinum in the US and Germany, and gold in Japan. According to Nielsen SoundScan it sold 546,000 copies in the US, and as of 31 March 2006, 2.4 million copies worldwide according to EMI.

In 2009, A Bigger Bang was reissued by Universal Music Group. The US re-release was handled by Interscope Records, while Polydor Records handled all other territories.

== Usage in other media ==
Songs from A Bigger Bang have seen commercial use in television, including multiple appearances in Days of Our Lives.

== Track listing ==
All tracks are written by Mick Jagger and Keith Richards.

A Bigger Bang track listing
No.	Title	Length
1.	"Rough Justice"	3:11
2.	"Let Me Down Slow"	4:16
3.	"It Won't Take Long"	3:54
4.	"Rain Fall Down"	4:54
5.	"Streets of Love"	5:10
6.	"Back of My Hand"	3:32
7.	"She Saw Me Coming"	3:12
8.	"Biggest Mistake"	4:06
9.	"This Place Is Empty"	3:12
10.	"Oh No, Not You Again"	3:46
11.	"Dangerous Beauty"	3:48
12.	"Laugh, I Nearly Died"	4:54
13.	"Sweet Neo Con"	4:33
14.	"Look What the Cat Dragged In"	3:57
15.	"Driving Too Fast"	3:56
16.	"Infamy"	3:47
Total length:		64:23

== Personnel ==
Credits adapted from album liner notes.

The Rolling Stones

- Mick Jagger – vocals (all tracks), guitars (1–5, 8, 10–16), keyboard (4, 12, 13, 16), vibraphone (4), bass guitar (6, 7, 11, 13, 14), harmonica (6, 13, 16), percussion (6, 7, 12, 15, 16), slide guitar (6, 9), production (all tracks)
- Keith Richards – guitars (all tracks), backing vocals (2, 3, 7, 8), lead vocals (9, 16), bass guitar (9, 10, 16), piano (9), keyboard (16), production (all tracks)
- Charlie Watts – drums (all tracks)
- Ronnie Wood – slide guitar (1, 2), guitars (3–5, 7, 8, 12, 14, 15)

Additional musicians

- Darryl Jones – bass guitar (1–5, 8, 10, 12, 14, 15)
- Chuck Leavell – piano (1, 5, 15), organ (3, 5, 8)
- Matt Clifford – keyboard (4, 5), vibraphone (4, 5), organ (5), piano (5), programming (4, 5), string arrangement (5), production (5)
- Blondie Chaplin – vocals (7, 16)
- Don Was – piano (9)
- Lenny Castro – percussion (14)

=== Production ===
- Don Was – production (all tracks)
- Ryan Castle – engineer (1)
- Andy Brohard – assistant engineer (1)
- Dave Sardy – mixing (1)
- Krish Sharma – engineer (all tracks), mixing (4, 6, 12–14, 16)
- Jack Joseph Puig – mixing (2, 3, 5, 7–11, 15)
- Dean Nelson – assistant engineer (2, 3, 5, 7–11, 15)
- J.D. Andrew – additional engineer and editing (4, 6, 12–14, 16)
- German Villacorta – 2nd assistant engineer (4, 6, 12–14, 16)
- Pierre de Beauport – guitar technician, demo engineer
- Stephen Marcussen – mastering
- Stewart Whitmore – digital editor for Marcussen Mastering
- Tony King – artwork coordination
- Nick Knight – photography
- Michael Nash Associates – design and art direction

== Charts ==
=== Weekly charts ===
Weekly chart performance for A Bigger Bang
Chart (2005)	Peak position
Australian Albums (ARIA)	4
Austrian Albums (Ö3 Austria)	1
Belgian Albums (Ultratop Flanders)	3
Belgian Albums (Ultratop Wallonia)	4
Canadian Albums (Billboard)	1
Czech Albums (ČNS IFPI)	2
Danish Albums (Hitlisten)	1
Dutch Albums (Album Top 100)	1
Finnish Albums (Suomen virallinen lista)	4
French Albums (SNEP)	3
German Albums (Offizielle Top 100)	1
Irish Albums (IRMA)	18
Italian Albums (FIMI)	1
New Zealand Albums (RMNZ)	2
Norwegian Albums (VG-lista)	2
Portuguese Albums (AFP)	5
Spanish Albums (Promusicae)	2
Swedish Albums (Sverigetopplistan)	1
Swiss Albums (Schweizer Hitparade)	1
UK Albums (Official Charts)	2
US Billboard 200	3

=== Year-end charts ===
Year-end chart performance for A Bigger Bang
Chart (2005)	Position
Austrian Albums (Ö3 Austria Top 40)	51
Belgian Albums (Ultratop Flanders)	66
Belgian Albums (Ultratop Wallonia)	52
Dutch Albums (Album Top 100)	31
French Albums (SNEP)	68
German Albums (GfK Entertainment charts)	27
Swedish Albums (Sverigetopplistan)	22
Swiss Albums (Schweizer Hitparade)	44
UK Albums (OCC)	165
US Billboard 200	188
Worldwide Albums (IFPI)	32

== Certifications and sales ==
Certifications and sales for A Bigger Bang
Region	Certification	Certified units/sales
Argentina (CAPIF)	Platinum	40,000^{^}
Austria (IFPI Austria)	Gold	15,000^{*}
Canada (Music Canada)	Platinum	100,000^{^}
Denmark (IFPI Danmark)	Gold	20,000^{^}
France (SNEP)	Gold	100,000^{*}
Germany (BVMI)	Platinum	200,000^{^}
Greece (IFPI Greece)	Gold	10,000^{^}
Italy sales in 2005	—	103,000
Japan (RIAJ)	Gold	100,000^{^}
Netherlands (NVPI)	Gold	40,000^{^}
New Zealand (RMNZ)	Gold	7,500^{^}
Poland (ZPAV)	Gold	10,000^{*}
Spain (Promusicae)	Gold	50,000^{^}
Sweden (GLF)	Gold	30,000^{^}
Switzerland (IFPI Switzerland)	Gold	20,000^{^}
United Kingdom (BPI)	Gold	100,000^{^}
United States (RIAA)	Platinum	1,000,000^{^}
Summaries
Europe (IFPI)	Platinum	1,000,000^{*}
^{*} Sales figures based on certification alone.^{^} Shipments figures based on certification alone.
