= Zaphod Beeblebrox (nightclub) =

Club in Ottawa, Canada (1992–2017)

- Zaphod's
- Interactive map of Zaphod Beeblebrox
- Location: Ottawa, Ontario, Canada
- Coordinates: 45.427943°N 75.693779°W
- Type: Nightclub

Construction
- Opened: March 1992
- Closed: May 14, 2017

Zaphod Beeblebrox was a ByWard Market nightclub in Ottawa, Ontario, Canada featuring live band performances.

It was themed after The Hitchhiker's Guide to the Galaxy, with drinks like the Pan Galactic Gargleblaster and other cocktails, and the Zaphod Beeblebrox style, which is described as "...the worst dressed sentient being in the universe, and even though he didn't try to be cool, he was."

Eugene D. Haslam originally opened the venue on Rideau Street in August 1989, but was shut down in January 1991 when Bell Canada purchased the club's property for its telephone facilities. Haslam reopened Zaphod Beeblebrox on York Street in March 1992. Haslam later acquired and reopened Barrymore's, an Ottawa live music venue in 1996, and opened another short-lived club on Bank Street which was named Zaphod's 2.

The club introduced Electronic Mondays in July 2012, a free-admission event hosted by DJ Lowpass featuring many genres of electronic music.

Zaphod's hosted many Canadian artists who would go on to international success, such as Alanis Morissette and Nickelback.

On August 29, 2005, the Rolling Stones shot the music video for "Streets of Love" at the club.

During the week of March 4–10, 2012, Zaphod's celebrated its 20th anniversary with week-long concerts and DJ sets.

On May 1, 2017, it was reported that the club would be closing within two weeks. It closed its doors for the last time on May 14, citing "uncertain economic times".
