= Streets of Love =

2005 single by the Rolling Stones

Single by the Rolling Stones

from the album A Bigger Bang
- A-side: "Rough Justice"
- Released: 22 August 2005
- Length: 5:10
- Label: Virgin
- Songwriter: Jagger/Richards
- Producers: Don Was; The Glimmer Twins

The Rolling Stones singles chronology
"Sympathy for the Devil (remix)" (2003)	"Streets of Love" / "Rough Justice" (2005)	"Rain Fall Down" (2005)

"Streets of Love" is a song by rock band the Rolling Stones which was released as a double A-side single with "Rough Justice" from the 2005 album A Bigger Bang. The single was released on 22 August 2005, prior to the album.

== Overview ==
"Streets of Love", a power ballad with a spare, guitar-based arrangement and falsetto chorus, received the main marketing push, though it failed to become a major hit in the US. By contrast, it went to number one in Spain, the top 10 in Argentina, Belgium, Denmark, Finland, the Netherlands, and Sweden, and the top 20 in Germany, Greece, Italy, and Norway. It was also a top 20 hit in the UK (where it was released as a double A-side with "Rough Justice"), reaching number 15 in the UK Singles Chart, some 42 years after their first UK hit "Come On".

"Streets of Love" is one of the few Rolling Stones songs licensed for use in advertising (See "Start Me Up", "You Can't Always Get What You Want", "She's a Rainbow"). It is heard in a television commercial for mobile telephony provider Vodafone Italy, in which the company's spokes-model Megan Gale also appears. The video for this song was shot at Zaphod Beeblebrox, a nightclub in Ottawa, Ontario, that no longer operates. Canadian actor Tan Arcade was cast and featured in the video.

It was debuted live on 11 July 2006 in San Siro, Milan, Italy. The song was played occasionally on the A Bigger Bang tour, mainly in 2006. The song was also played once on the 14 On Fire tour, featuring former guitarist Mick Taylor.

== Track listing ==
- CD and 7-inch single (VSCDT1905; VS1905)
1. "Streets of Love" – 5:10
2. "Rough Justice" – 3:11

== Personnel ==
- Mick Jagger – vocals and electric rhythm guitar
- Keith Richards – acoustic guitar
- Ron Wood – electric lead guitar
- Charlie Watts – drums

Additional musicians

- Darryl Jones – bass guitar
- Chuck Leavell and Matt Clifford – pianos and organs
- Matt Clifford – strings and programming

== Charts ==
Chart (2005)	Peak position
Austria (Ö3 Austria Top 40)	26
Belgium (Ultratop 50 Flanders)	41
Belgium (Ultratip Bubbling Under Wallonia)	6
Canada (Nielsen SoundScan)	10
Denmark (Tracklisten)	4
Europe (Eurochart Hot 100)	16
Finland (Suomen virallinen lista)	10
Germany (GfK)	15
Greece (IFPI)	15
Hungary (Rádiós Top 40)	32
Ireland (IRMA) with "Rough Justice"	27
Italy (FIMI)	17
Netherlands (Dutch Top 40)	12
Netherlands (Single Top 100)	5
Norway (VG-lista)	14
Scottish Singles Sales (Official Charts) with "Rough Justice"	12
Spain (Promusicae)	1
Sweden (Sverigetopplistan)	5
Switzerland (Schweizer Hitparade)	21
UK Singles (Official Charts) with "Rough Justice"	15
