= This Place Is Empty =

Song by the Rolling Stones

from the album A Bigger Bang
- Released: 5 September 2005
- Recorded: June 2005
- Genre: Rock
- Length: 3:17
- Label: Virgin
- Songwriter(s): Jagger/Richards
- Producer(s): Don Was

"This Place Is Empty" is a song from the Rolling Stones' 2005 album A Bigger Bang. It is the first of two songs on the album sung by Keith Richards, the other being "Infamy".

In promotional video on the Rolling Stones official website, Richards stated the song started one evening in his Connecticut home when his wife was out without him. He said he was sitting on a couch with the guitar and the song sparked. The final version is a bittersweet ballad where Richards pines for his familiar face:

Come on, bare your breasts
And make me feel at home
You and me we're just like all the rest
And we don't want to be alone

It was formally recorded in Mick Jagger's estate in France. The song is notable for its clear piano opening and raspy vocal imprint. Largely an acoustic song, Richards performs guitar with Jagger performing slide guitar. Richards also performs bass and piano for the recording. Jagger played drums on the original recording, but Charlie Watts' drumming was later added.

The song was played on certain dates of the 2006 A Bigger Bang Tour set list, often alongside "Happy".

"This Place Is Empty" has been covered by Belgian singer Gilles Snowcat on his album You've Been Unboxing Gilles Snowcat in 2020.

== Personnel ==
Credits adapted from album liner notes.

The Rolling Stones

- Keith Richards – vocals, guitar, bass, piano
- Mick Jagger – slide guitar, backing vocals
- Charlie Watts – drums

Additional Performer

- Don Was – piano
