= Oh No, Not You Again =

Song by The Rolling Stones

from the album A Bigger Bang
- Released: 5 September 2005
- Recorded: May and June 2005
- Genre: Rock
- Length: 3:47
- Label: Virgin
- Songwriter: Jagger-Richards
- Producer: Don Was

"Oh No, Not You Again" is a song by English rock band the Rolling Stones, included on their 2005 studio album A Bigger Bang. The tenth track on the album, it was written by Mick Jagger and Keith Richards, and features Jagger on vocals and guitar, Richards on guitar and bass, and Charlie Watts on drums.

== Brief history ==
"Oh No, Not You Again" is one of the most well-known tracks from A Bigger Bang, the Stones' first new studio album since 1997's Bridges to Babylon. The song was used in media campaigns and tour promotions for the band. It was the first new song from A Bigger Bang played for a public audience in a surprise performance at the Juilliard School in New York City.

Throughout the 2005–2006 A Bigger Bang Tour, which carried the Stones throughout North America and Europe, "Oh No, Not You Again" was played continuously and received generally well by fans and critics alike, although critics noted the similarities in structure to previous Rolling Stones efforts from the early 1970s.

The song got significant rock radio airplay in the US, reaching No. 34 on Billboard's Mainstream Rock Tracks in December 2005.

Charlie Watts jokingly said that the song's title should also be the name of the album, referring to the band's constant return to the studio.

== Next single rumors ==
The tune was erroneously believed to be the next single released from A Bigger Bang in Spring 2006. This rumor was proved false when in April 2006 it was announced that the European summer single would be "Biggest Mistake".

== Personnel ==
Credits adapted from album liner notes.

The Rolling Stones

- Mick Jagger – vocals, guitar
- Keith Richards – guitars, bass guitar
- Ronnie Wood – guitar
- Charlie Watts – drums

Additional Performer

- Darryl Jones – bass guitar
