= Biggest Mistake =

Single by The Rolling Stones

from the album A Bigger Bang
- Released: 21 August 2006
- Recorded: 2004–2005
- Genre: Pop rock, AOR
- Length: 4:06
- Label: Virgin
- Songwriter(s): Jagger–Richards
- Producer(s): Don Was

The Rolling Stones singles chronology
"Rain Fall Down" (2005)	"Biggest Mistake" (2006)	"Plundered My Soul" (2010)

"Biggest Mistake" is a song by the English rock band the Rolling Stones from their 2005 album A Bigger Bang. It was released on 21 August 2006 as the third single from the album, and reached number 51 in the UK Singles Chart.

Credited to Mick Jagger and Keith Richards, the track is a pop rock song with a strongly acoustic guitar-based arrangement and lyrics, that tell the story of an older man who falls in love but then walks out on his partner. It could be about the failed relationship between Jagger and model Jerry Hall. Beginning in late July, the song received extensive radio airplay, particularly on BBC Radio 2, where it remained on the A-Playlist for four weeks.

== Track listing ==
- CD
1. "Biggest Mistake" – 4:07
2. "Dance (Pt. 1)" (live) – 6:01 (Olympia, Paris, 11 July 2003)
3. "Before They Make Me Run" (live) – 3:54 (Olympia, Paris, 11 July 2003)
- 7"

Side 1

1. "Biggest Mistake" – 4:07

Side 2

1. "Hand of Fate" (live) (Olympia, Paris, 11 July 2003)

== Personnel ==
Credits adapted from album liner notes.

The Rolling Stones

- Mick Jagger – vocals, guitar
- Keith Richards – guitar, backing vocals
- Ronnie Wood – guitar
- Charlie Watts – drums

Additional musicians

- Darryl Jones – bass guitar
- Chuck Leavell – organ

== Charts ==
Chart (2006)	Peak position
Germany (GfK)	94
Italy (FIMI)	27
Netherlands (Single Top 100)	77
UK Singles (OCC)	51
