= Rain Fall Down =

2005 single by the Rolling Stones

Single by the Rolling Stones

from the album A Bigger Bang
- Released: 5 December 2005
- Genre: Funk rock
- Length: 4:54 (album version); 4:00 (radio edit)
- Label: Virgin
- Songwriter(s): Jagger/Richards
- Producer(s): Don Was

The Rolling Stones singles chronology
"Streets of Love" / "Rough Justice" (2005)	"Rain Fall Down" (2005)	"Biggest Mistake" (2006)

"Rain Fall Down" is a song from the Rolling Stones' 2005 album, A Bigger Bang. It was released on 5 December 2005 as the second single from the album, reaching number 33 in the UK Singles Chart, and served as their last top 40 hit in the UK until 2023 when "Angry" reached number 34. The single also reached number 21 on Billboard's Hot Dance Club Play chart in February 2006.

== Track listings ==
- 7-inch, CD (VS1907; VSCDX1907)
1. "Rain Fall Down" – 4:54
2. "Rain Fall Down" (will.i.am Remix)
3. "Rain Fall Down" (Ashley Beedle's 'Heavy Disco' Vocal Re-Edit)
- Dutch CD (VSCDX1907 0094634858021)
1. "Rain Fall Down" (will.i.am Remix) – 4:04
2. "Rain Fall Down" (Radio Edit) – 4:00
3. "Rain Fall Down" (Ashley Beedle's 'Heavy Disco' Radio Edit) – 4:04
- 12-inch (VST1907)
1. "Rain Fall Down" (will.i.am Remix)
2. "Rain Fall Down" (Ashley Beedle's 'Heavy Disco' Vocal Re-Edit)

== Personnel ==
Credits adapted from album liner notes.

The Rolling Stones

- Mick Jagger – vocals, guitar, keyboards, vibes
- Keith Richards – guitar
- Ronnie Wood – guitar
- Charlie Watts – drums

Additional musicians

- Darryl Jones – bass guitar
- Matt Clifford – keyboards, vibes, programming

== Charts ==
Chart (2005–2006)	Peak position
Germany (GfK)	80
Italy (FIMI)	46
Netherlands (Single Top 100)	31
Sweden (Sverigetopplistan)	51
Switzerland (Schweizer Hitparade)	77
UK Singles (OCC)	33
US Adult Alternative Songs (Billboard)	13
